= Bay Islet =

Uninhabited island in Sai Kung District, Hong Kong

Native name: 匙洲
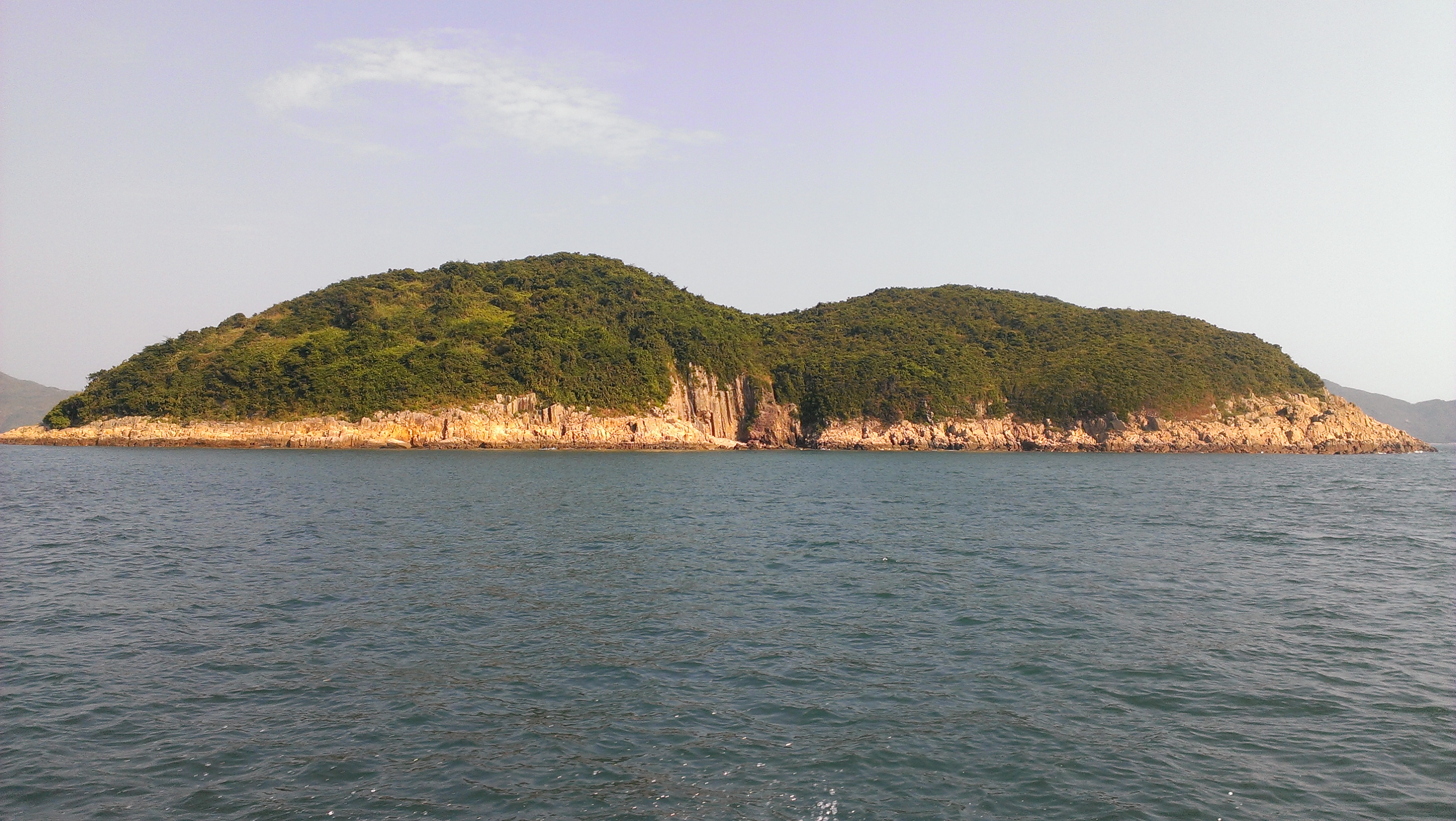
- Bay Islet as seen from the West

- Location within Hong Kong

Geography
- Coordinates: 22°20′8.2″N 114°20′1.9″E
- Area: 0.08 km^{2} (0.031 sq mi)

Administration
- Hong Kong
- Districts: Sai Kung District

Bay Islet or See Chau (Chinese: 匙洲) is an uninhabited island in Sai Kung District, Hong Kong.

== Geography ==
Bay Islet is located in Rocky Harbour, also known as Leung Shuen Wan Hoi, and is separated from Jin Island by the See Chau Mun (匙洲門) channel. The island has a maximum elevation of 44.8 m and an area of 8 hectares.
