= Mau Wu Tsai =

Coordinates: 22.316255°N 114.253609°E

Mau Wu Tsai (Chinese: 茅湖仔) is a village in the Tseung Kwan O area of Sai Kung District, New Territories, Hong Kong.

== Administration ==
Mau Wu Tsai is a recognized village under the New Territories Small House Policy.
