= Basalt Island =

Island of Hong Kong

Coordinates: 22.31578°N 114.36562°E

- Chinese: 火石洲
Transcriptions
Standard Mandarin
- Hanyu Pinyin: Huǒshí Zhōu
Yue: Cantonese
- Jyutping: fo2 sek6 zau1
- Sidney Lau: Foh^{2} Sek^{6} Jau^{1}

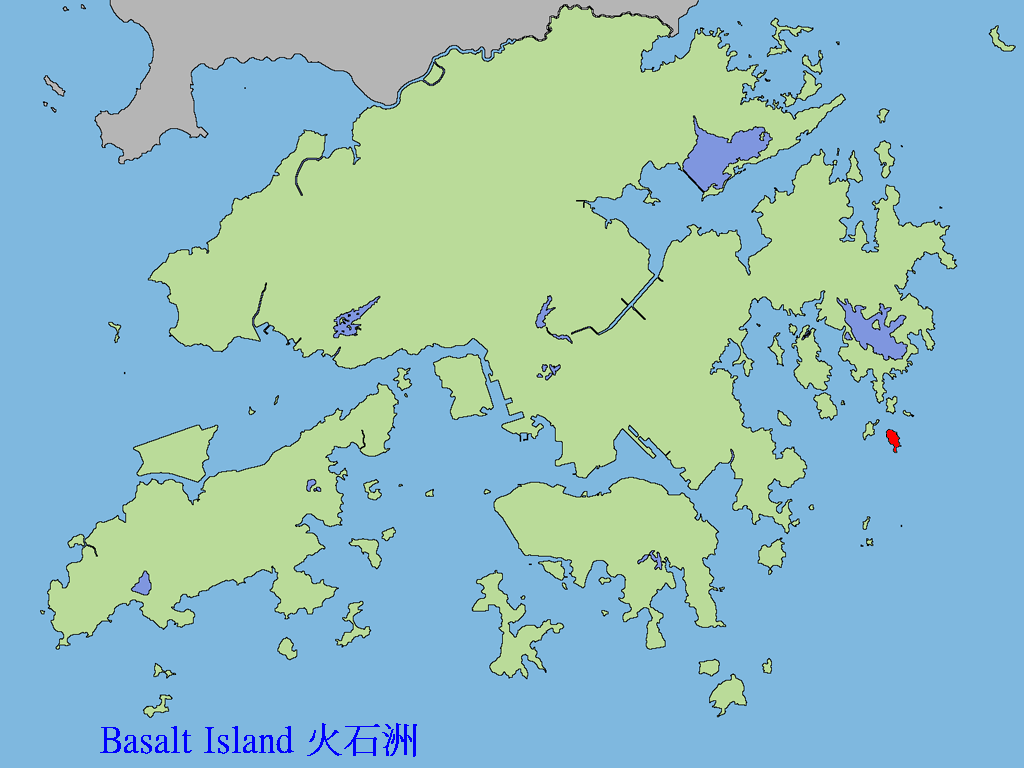
Location of Basalt Island

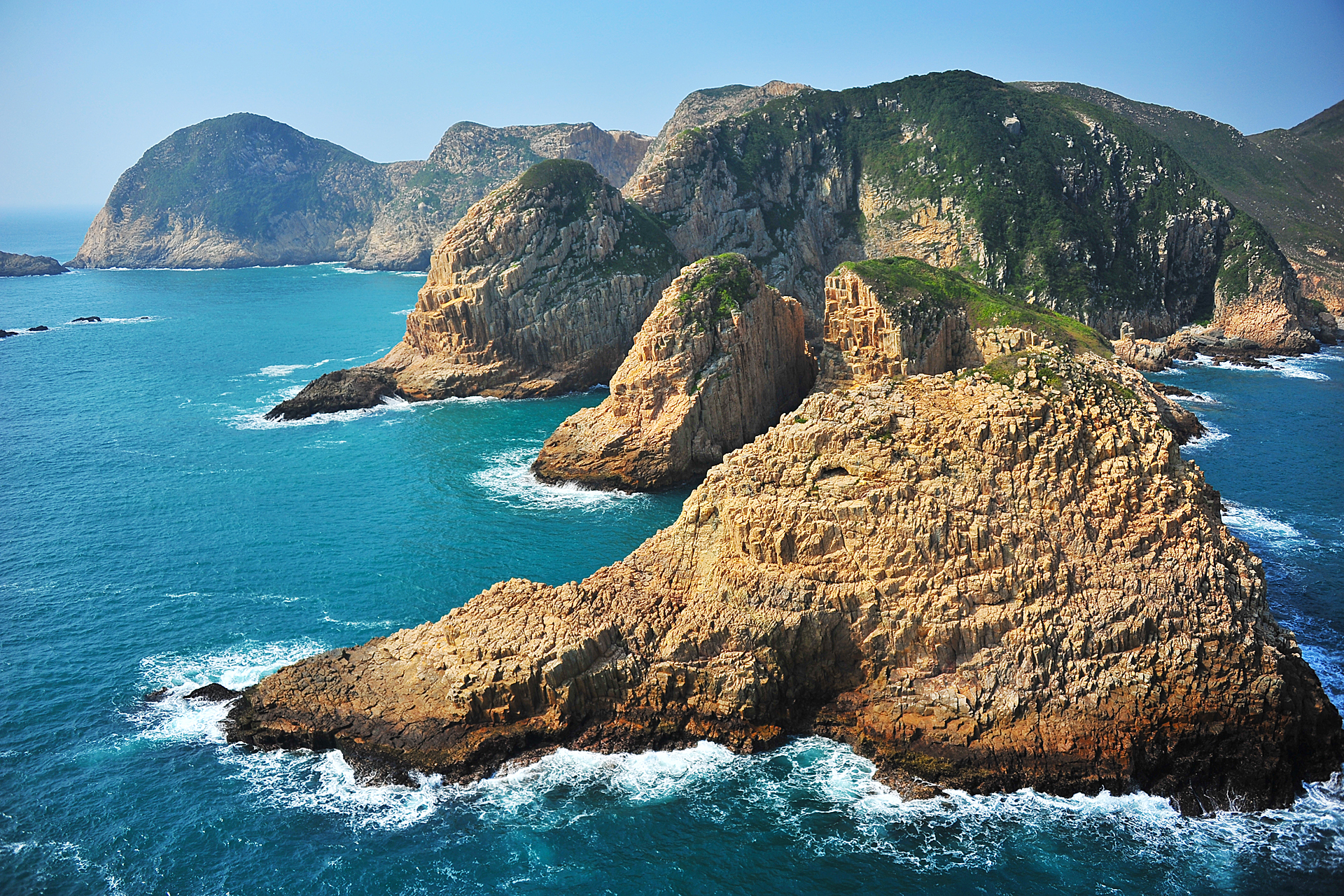
Basalt Island

Basalt Island or Fo Shek Chau (Chinese: 火石洲; Sidney Lau: Foh^{2} Sek^{6} Jau^{1}) is an island of Hong Kong and administratively part of Sai Kung District. Together with Wang Chau and Bluff Island, it forms the Ung Kong (甕缸; Ung^{3} Gong^{1}) Group and is part of Hong Kong Global Geopark.

== Geography ==
Basalt Island is located south of Town Island and Wang Chau, east of Bluff Island and north of the Ninepin Group. Its highest elevation is 174 m. Notably, despite its name is “Basalt Island”, the rocks that forms the island are indeed rhyolitic tuff.

== History ==
On 21 December 1948, Basalt Island was the site of the first commercial airliner crash in Hong Kong, in which all 35 people on board, including five women, one child and seven crew, were killed. CNAC flight XT-104 from Shanghai to Hong Kong Kai Tak Airport was operated by a C-54 Skymaster. Fog over the island was the official cause of the crash.

Quentin Roosevelt II, the grandson of American president Theodore Roosevelt and then Senior Vice President of China National Aviation Corporation (CNAC), and Paul Yung, elder brother of Rong Yiren who was later to become vice-president of the People's Republic of China, were among the casualties.

Debris remains near the site of the crash.

== Conservation ==
The island was zoned as a Site of Special Scientific Interest in 1979.

The Ung Kong Group Special Area (甕缸群島特別地區) covers 176.8 hectares and was designated in 2011. It consists of Basalt Island, Bluff Island, Wang Chau, their surrounding islets, and Kam Chung Ngam (金鐘岩) in the southern part of Jin Island. The geology of the area is characterised by volcanic rocks of the Cretaceous periods.

== See also ==
- Basalt
