= Jin Island =

Island in the Port Shelter, the New Territories, Hong Kong

Coordinates: 22°19′57.52″N 114°19′24.53″E

- Traditional Chinese: 吊鐘洲
- Simplified Chinese: 吊钟洲
- Literal meaning: Hanging bell island
Transcriptions
Standard Mandarin
- Hanyu Pinyin: Diào zhōng zhōu
Yue: Cantonese
- Yale Romanization: Diu jūng jāu
- Jyutping: Diu3 zung1 zau1

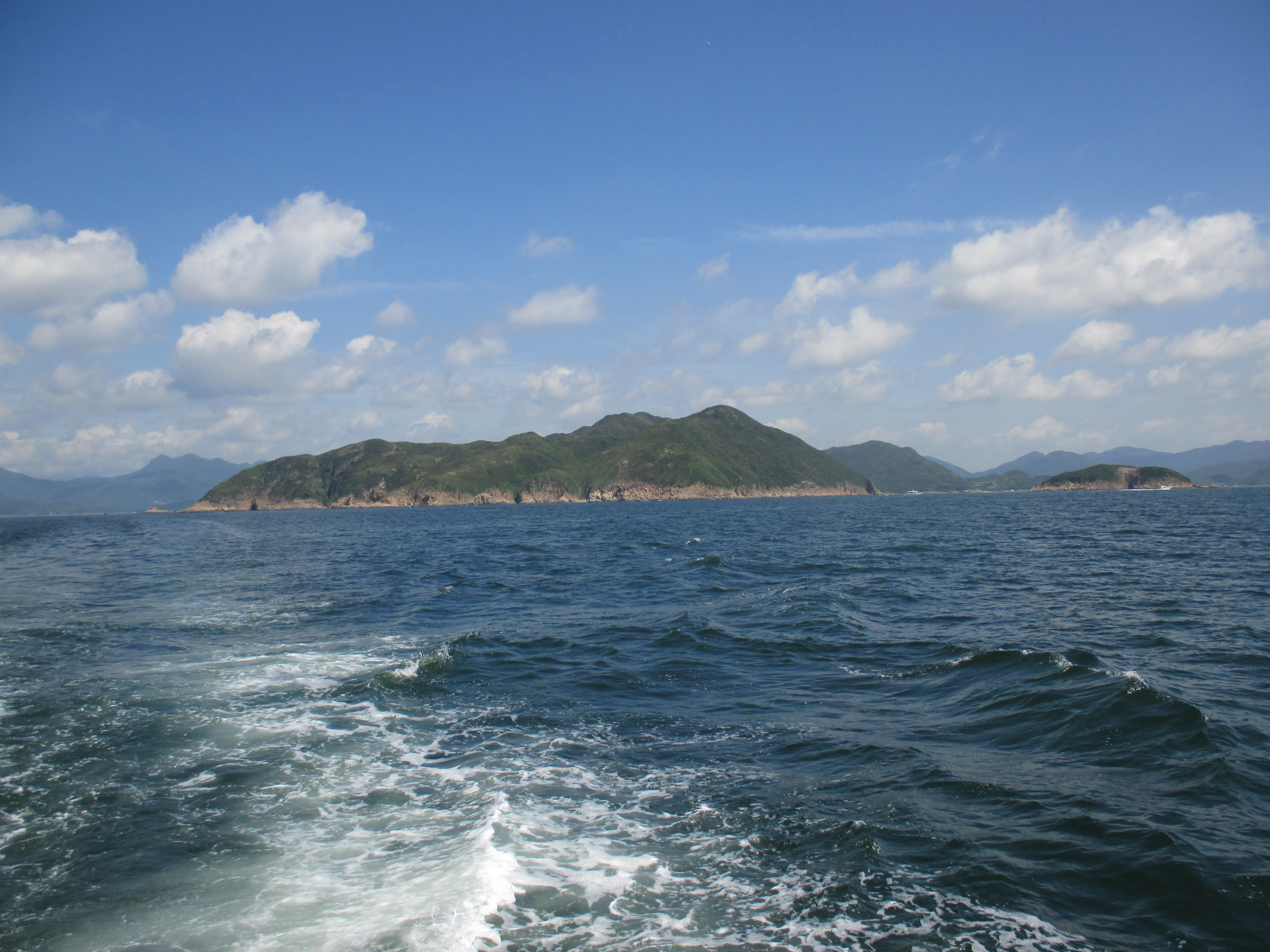
Jin Island and Bay Islet (right), viewed from the southeast.

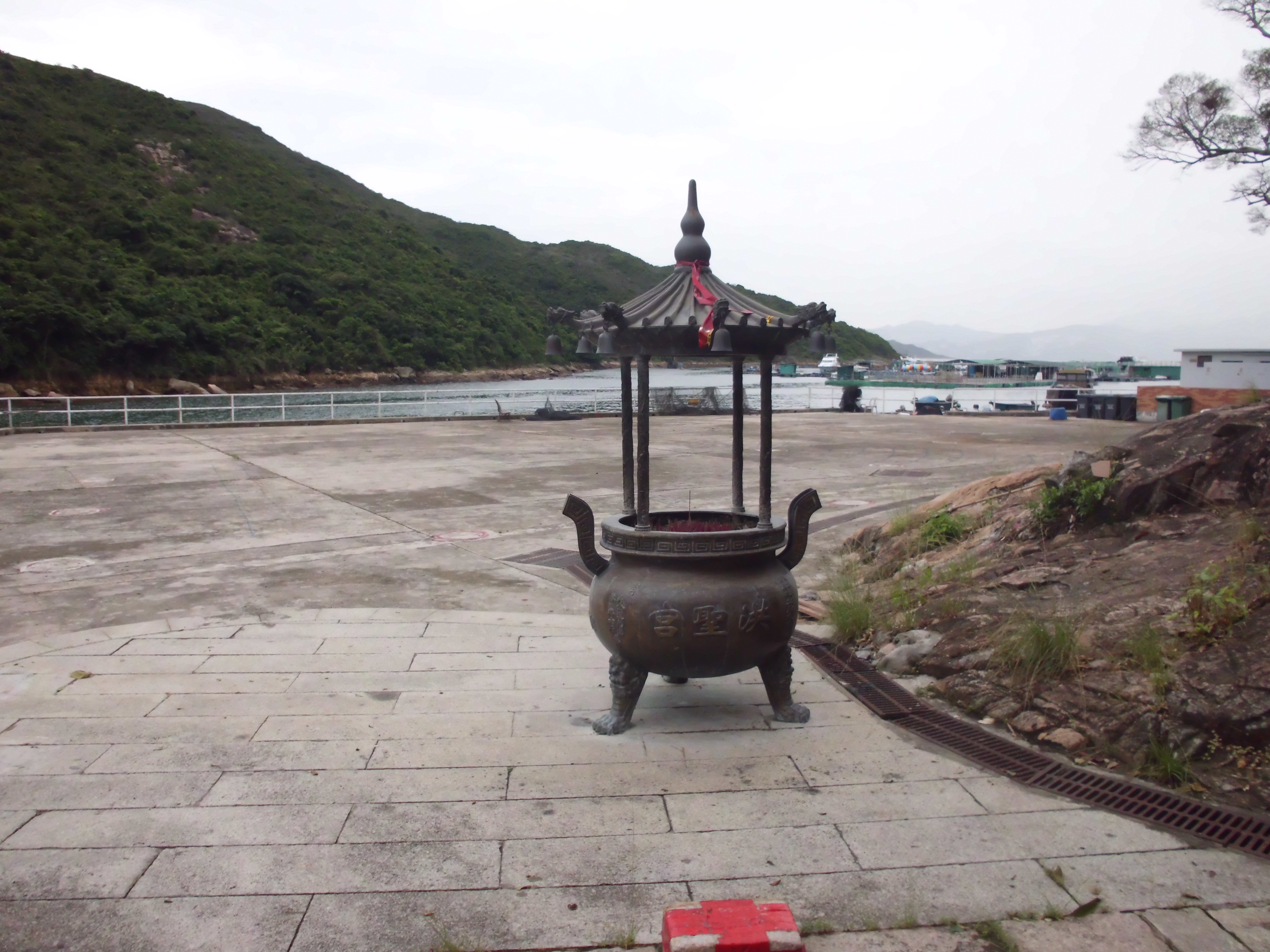
View from Hung Shing Temple, Kau Sai Chau. The island visible across the narrow channel is Jin Island.

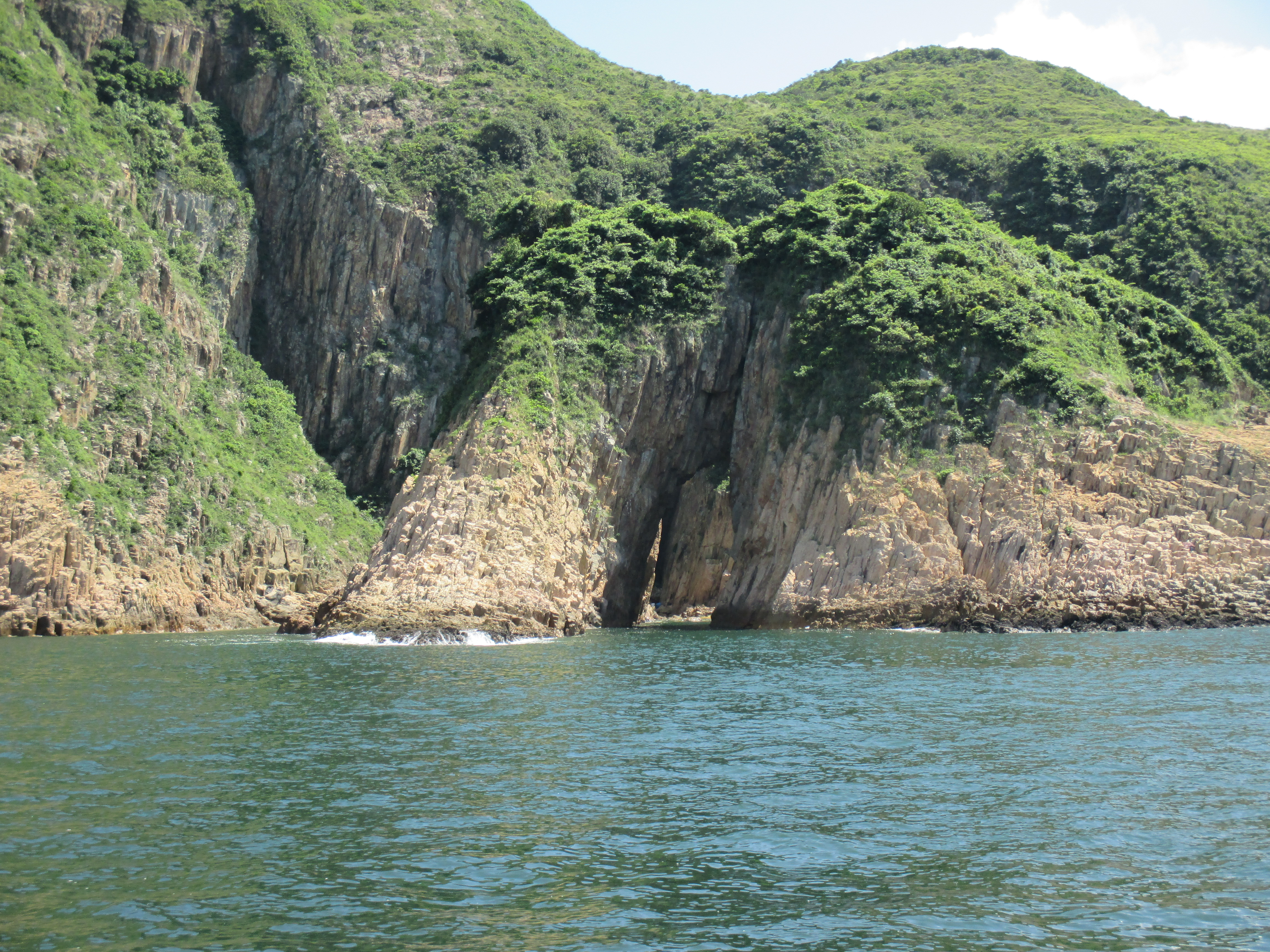
Kam Chung Ngam

Jin Island or Tiu Chung Chau (Chinese: 吊鐘洲; lit. 'Hanging bell island') is an island in the Port Shelter, the New Territories, Hong Kong. Administratively it is part of the Sai Kung District.

== Geography ==
Jin Island is located south of the larger island of Kau Sai Chau, from which it is separated by a narrow channel. The island has a maximum elevation of 216 m and an area of 1.8 km^{2}. The smaller Bay Islet (See Chau) is located off its eastern coast, from which it is separated by the channel See Chau Mun (匙洲門).

Because of exposure to the easterly winds and sea waves, landforms such as sea caves, stacks, arches and inlets add to the natural landscape of Jin Island.

The best-known sea cave in Jin Island is Kam Chung Ngam (金鐘岩), commonly known as Goldfish Wagging Tail (金魚擺尾). Tourists can get a perfect shot of the fish shape from the top of the hill.

== Conservation ==
The Ung Kong Group Special Area (甕缸群島特別地區) covers 176.8 hectares and was designated in 2011. It consists of Basalt Island, Bluff Island, Wang Chau, their surrounding islets, and Kam Chung Ngam in the southern part of Jin Island. The geology of the area is characterised by volcanic rocks of the Cretaceous periods.
