= Ninepin Group =

Group of 29 small islands in Hong Kong

Coordinates: 22°15′51″N 114°21′29″E

- Traditional Chinese: 九針群島
- Simplified Chinese: 九针群岛
Transcriptions
Standard Mandarin
- Hanyu Pinyin: Jiǔ Zhēn Qúndǎo
Yue: Cantonese
- Jyutping: gau2 zam1 kwan4 dou2

Kwo Chau Islands
- Traditional Chinese: 果洲群島
- Simplified Chinese: 果洲群岛
Transcriptions
Standard Mandarin
- Hanyu Pinyin: Guǒ Zhōu Qúndǎo
Yue: Cantonese
- Jyutping: gwo2 zau1 kwan4 dou2

Location of the Ninepin Group within Hong Kong

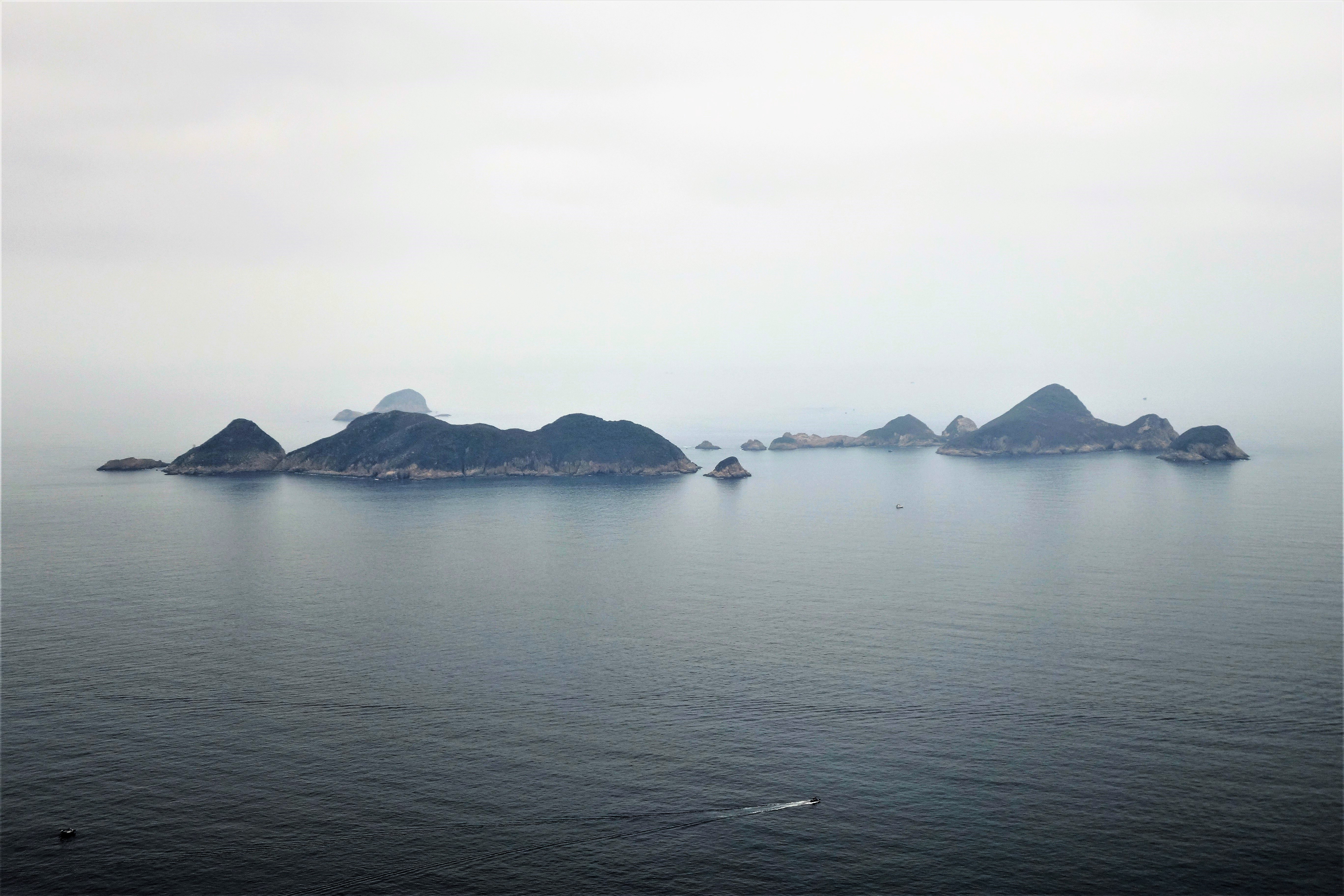
Aerial View of North and South Ninepin Island

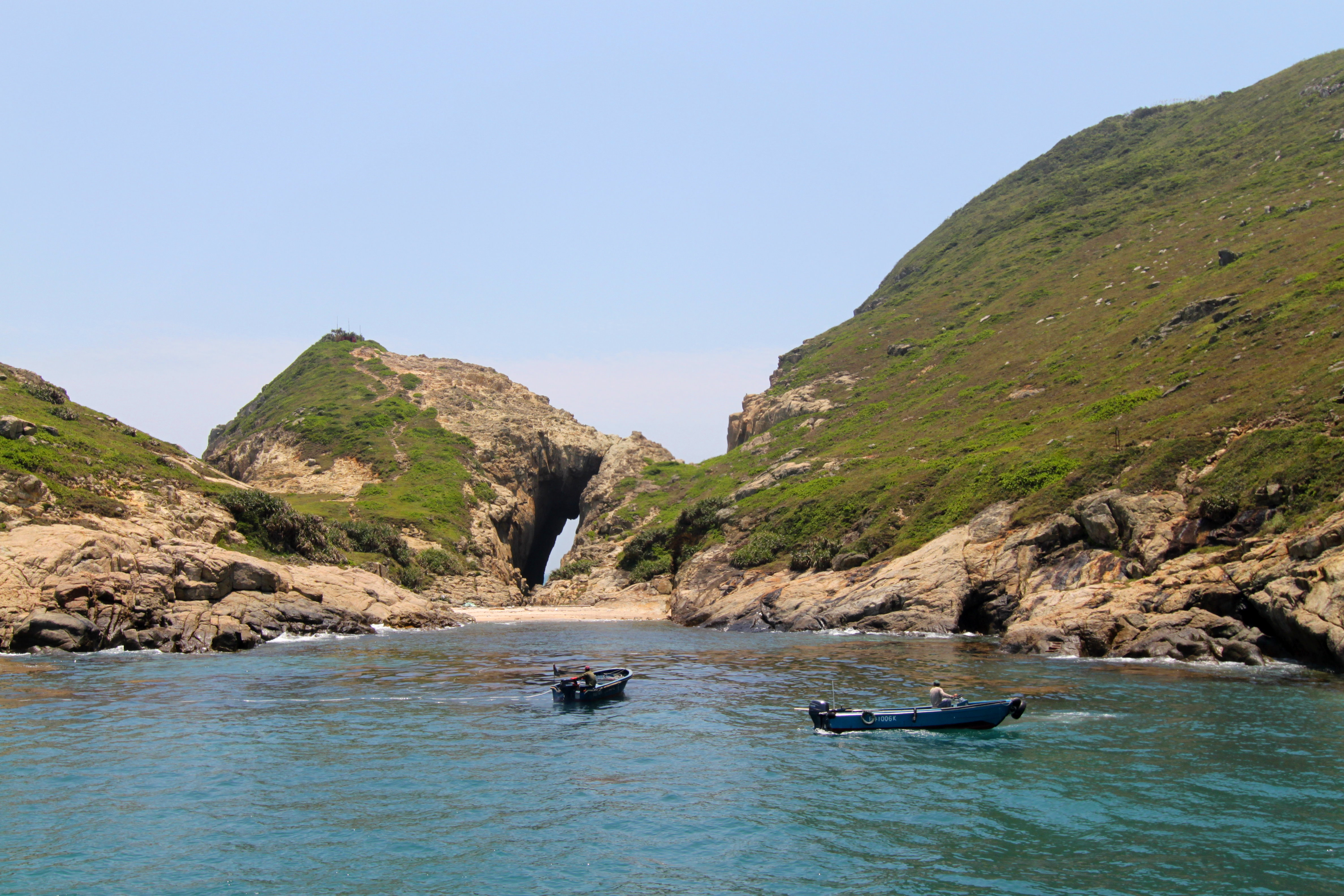
South Ninepin Island. A small Tin Hau temple is located at the top of the hill at the centre of the picture.

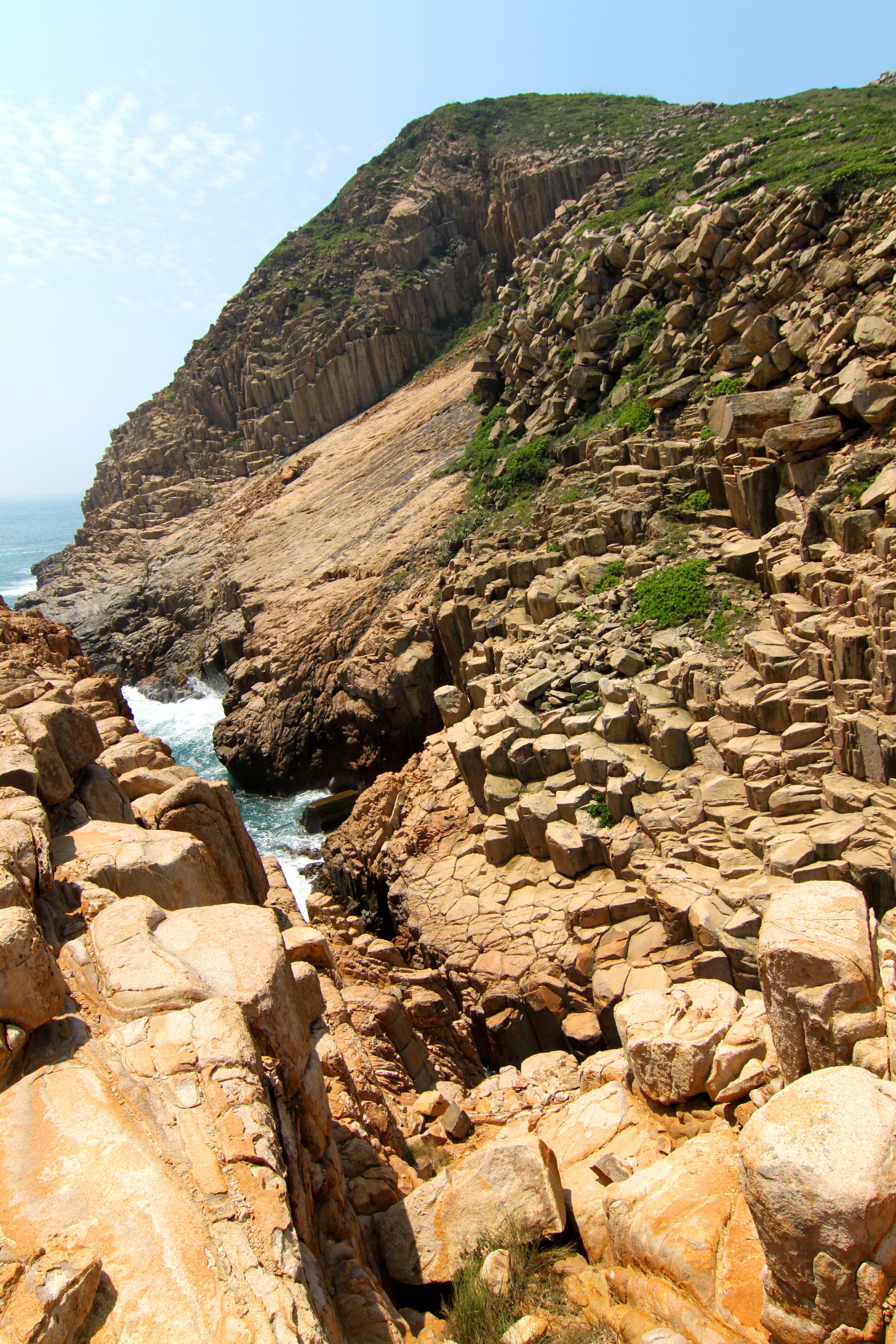
North Ninepin Island

The Ninepin Group (Chinese: 九針群島) or Kwo Chau Islands (果洲群島) is a group of 29 islands in the easternmost waters of Hong Kong. The Ninepin Group falls under the jurisdiction of Sai Kung District of Hong Kong.

== Islands ==
The islands of the group include:

- East Ninepin Island (Tung Kwo Chau; 東果洲)
  - Lung Shuen Pai (龍船排) or Fo Siu Pai (火燒排)
  - Tuen Chau Chai (短洲仔)
  - Tuen Chau Mei (短洲尾)
  - Shue Long Chau (蕃莨洲) or Kong Tau Pai (光頭排)
- North Ninepin Island (Pak Kwo Chau; 北果洲)
  - Hok Tsai Pai (殼仔排)
  - Ngan Peng Keng (銀瓶頸)
  - Ngan Peng Tau (銀瓶頭)
  - North Ninepin Island (北果洲)
  - Sai Chau Mei (細洲尾)
  - Tuen Keng (斷頸)
- South Ninepin Island (Nam Kwo Chau; 南果洲)
  - Tai Chau (大洲) - where the Kwo Chau Wan (果洲灣) beach is located
  - Tai Chau Mei (大洲尾)
  - Ta Long Pai (打浪排)
  - Lai Chi Pai (荔枝排)

== Geography ==
The Ninepin Group features hexagonal vertical rhyolite columns, the volcanic rock resulting from a volcanic eruption near Sai Kung about 140 million years ago. Ninepin Group is extremely eroded due to the heavy tides that wash against the islands every day. It features several sea caves as a result of erosion. For a long time, the Ninepin Group was devoid of human presence. However, there is a temple dedicated to Tin Hau, located on South Ninepin Island for any fishermen who landed on the island.

== Conservation ==
The Ninepin Group Special Area (果洲群島特別地區) covers 53.1 hectares and was designated in 2011. It consists of the islands that make up the Ninepin Group. The geology of the area is characterised by volcanic rocks of the Cretaceous period.

== Transportation ==
Because no one lives on Ninepin Group, there is no public transportation to the islands. One must rent a boat in order to reach the Ninepin Group.

== See also ==
- Hong Kong UNESCO Global Geopark
