= Wang Chau (Sai Kung District) =

Island of Hong Kong

Coordinates: 22.329489°N 114.374274°E

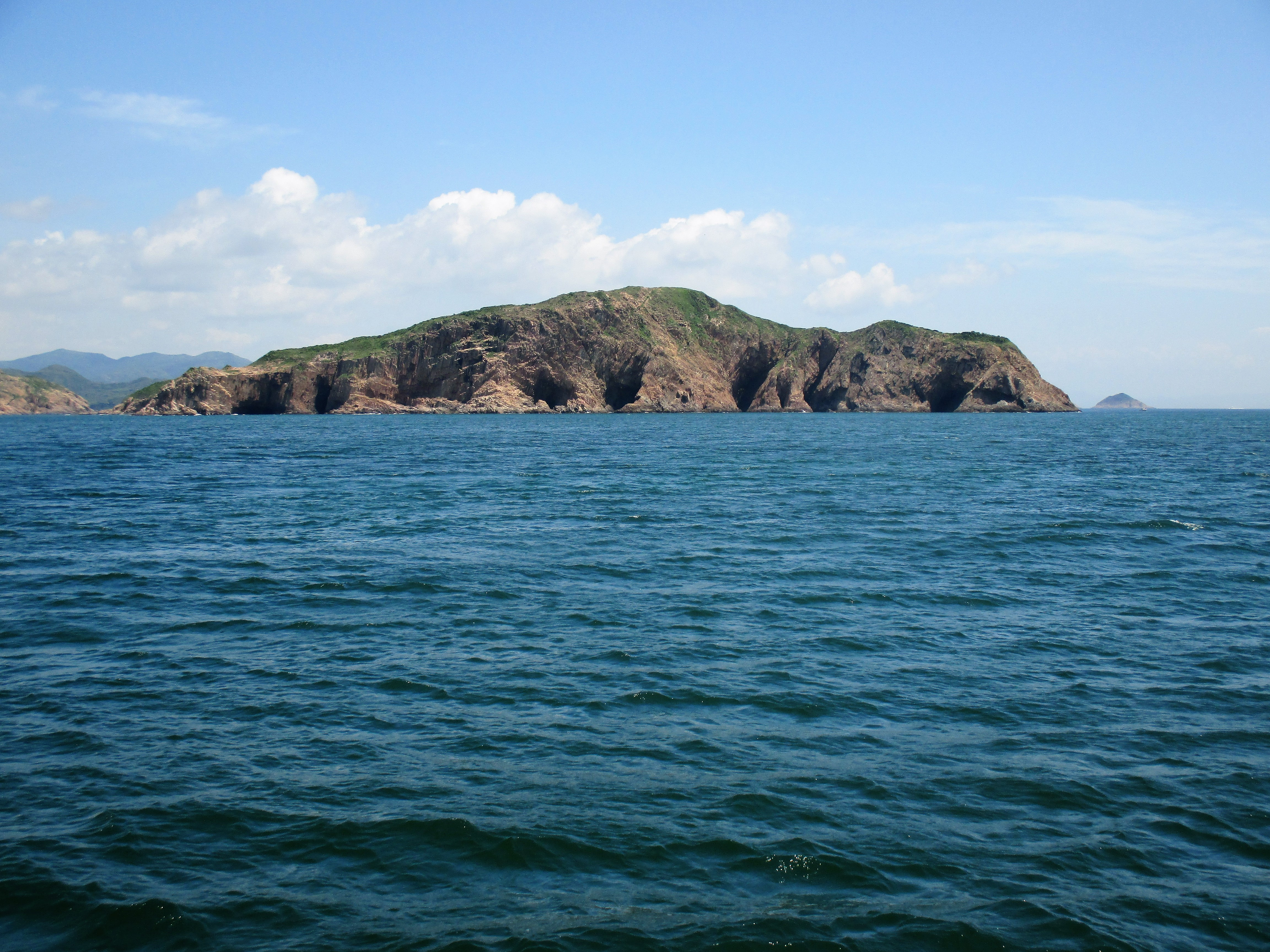
Wang Chau viewed from the south.

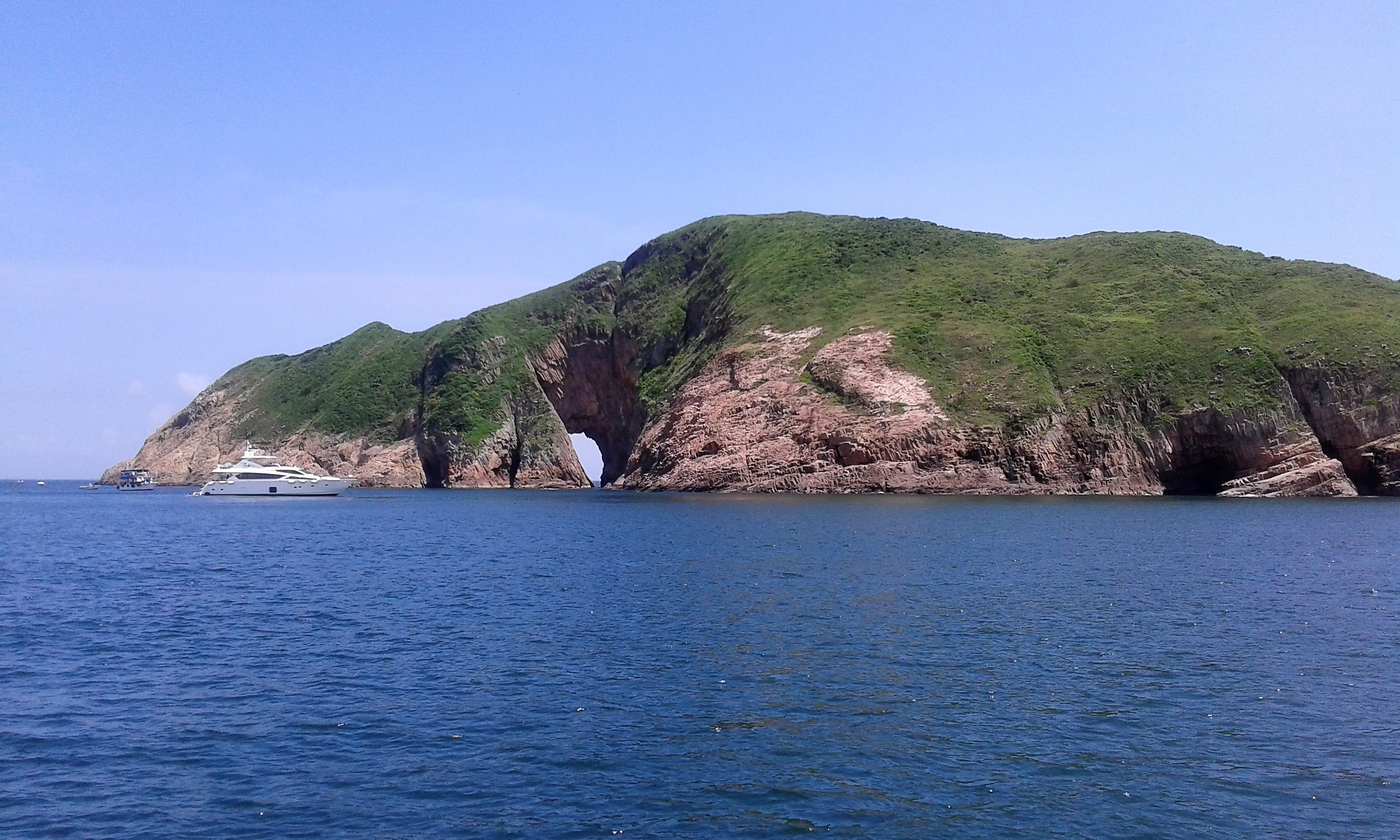
Wang Chau viewed from the north.

Wang Chau (Chinese: 橫洲) is an island of Hong Kong. Administratively, it is part of Sai Kung District.

== Conservation ==
Together with Basalt Island and Bluff Island, it forms the Ung Kong Group (甕缸群島) and is part of Hong Kong Global Geopark.

The Ung Kong Group Special Area (甕缸群島特別地區) covers 176.8 hectares and was designated in 2011. It consists of Basalt Island, Bluff Island, Wang Chau, their surrounding islets, and Kam Chung Ngam (金鐘岩) in the southern part of Jin Island. The geology of the area is characterised by volcanic rocks of the Cretaceous periods.
