= Hong Kong UNESCO Global Geopark =

Geopark in eastern Hong Kong

- Traditional Chinese: 香港聯合國教科文組織世界地質公園
- Simplified Chinese: 香港联合国教科文组织世界地质公园
Transcriptions
Standard Mandarin
- Hanyu Pinyin: Xiānggǎng Liánhéguó Jiào Kē Wén Zǔzhī Shìjiè Dìzhì Gōngyuán
Yue: Cantonese
- Jyutping: hoeng1 gong2 lyun4 hap6 gwok3 gaau3 fo1 man4 zou2 zik1 sai3 gaai3 dei6 zat1 gung1 jyun4*2

Hong Kong National Geopark
- Traditional Chinese: 香港國家地質公園
- Simplified Chinese: 香港国家地质公园
Transcriptions
Standard Mandarin
- Hanyu Pinyin: Xiānggǎng Guójiā Dìzhì Gōngyuán
Yue: Cantonese
- Jyutping: hoeng1 gong2 gwok3 gaa1 dei6 zat1 gung1 jyun4*2

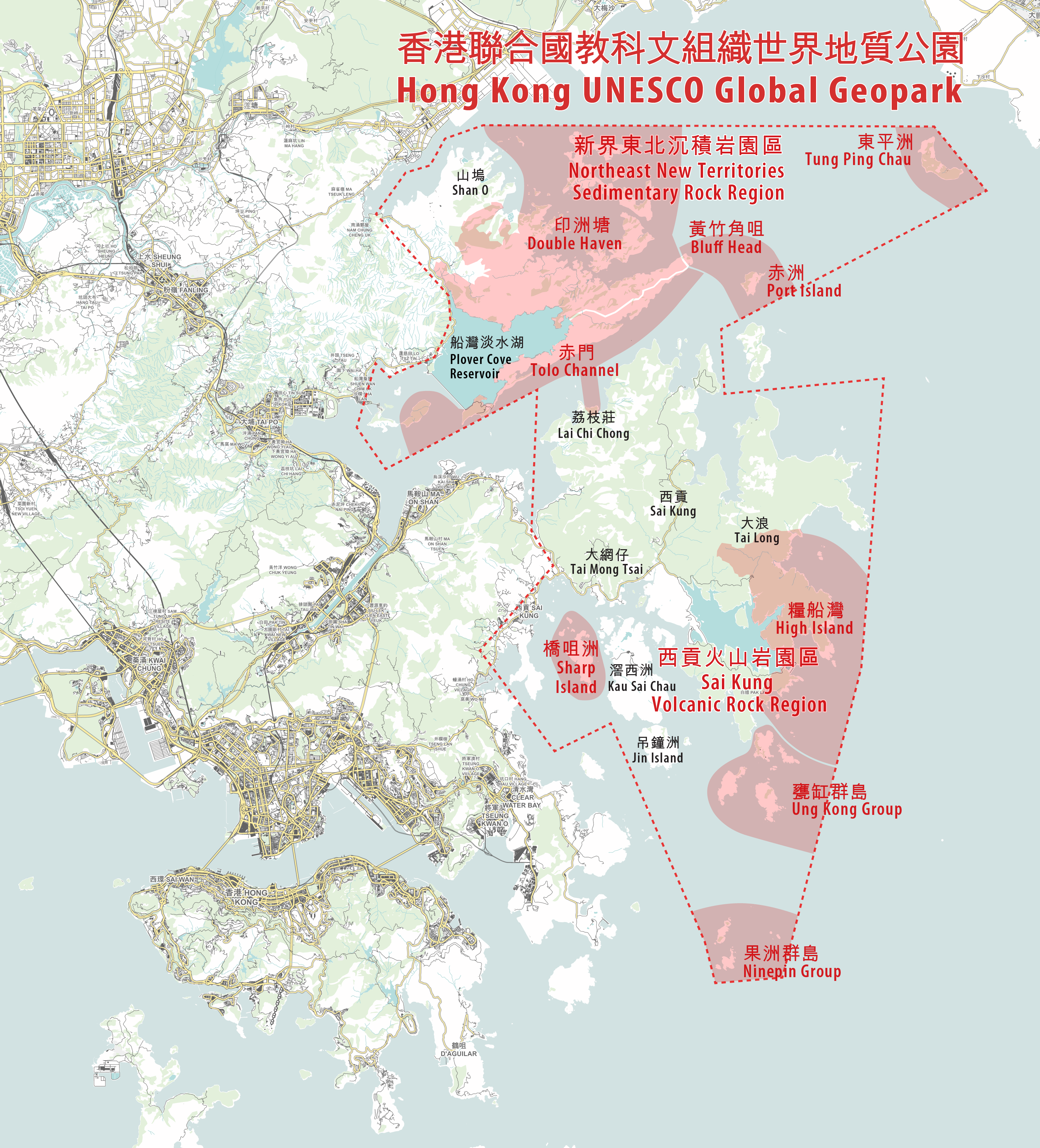
Overview map

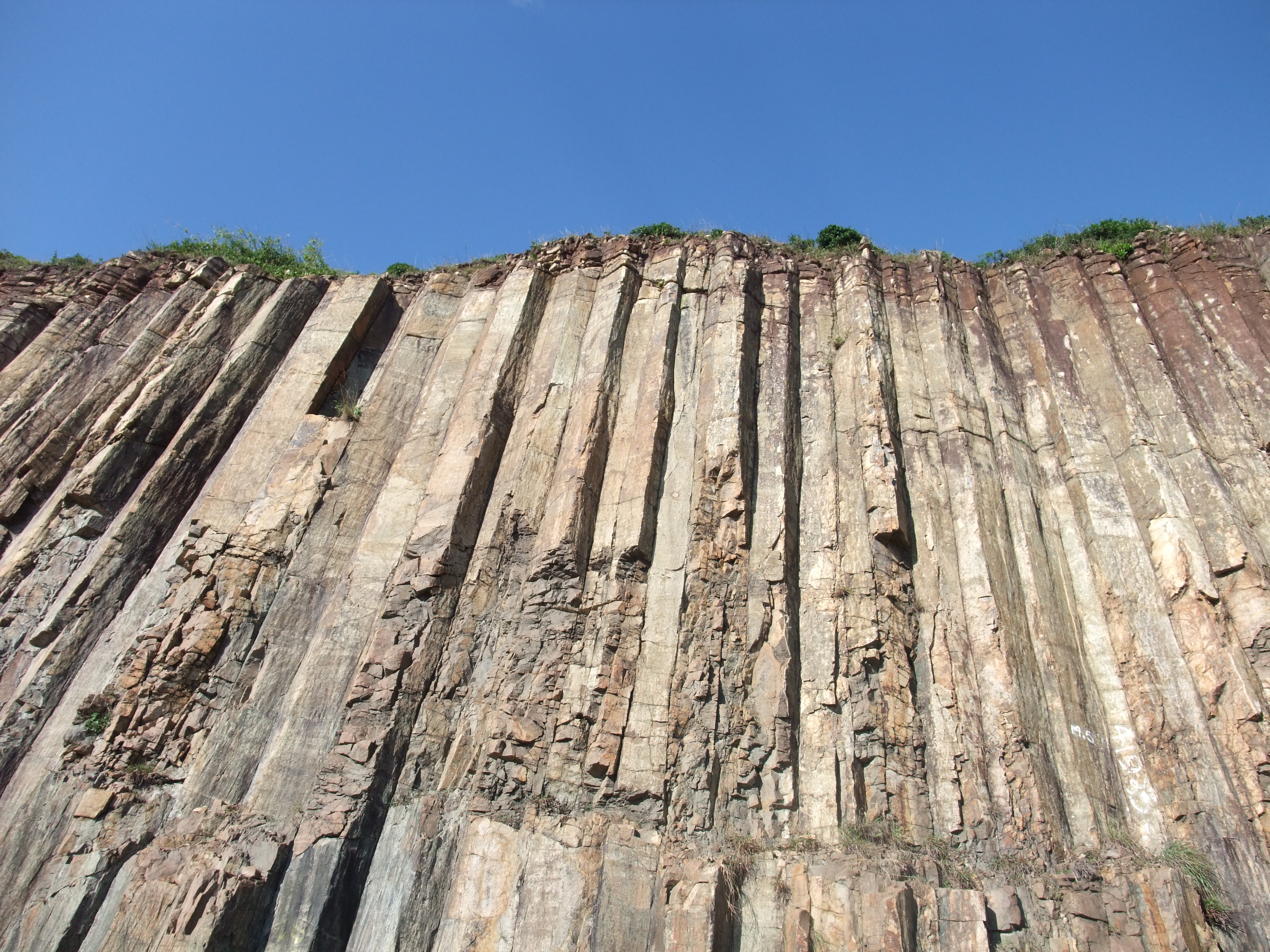
Volcanic tuffs with hexagonal columnar jointing at East Dam of High Island Reservoir

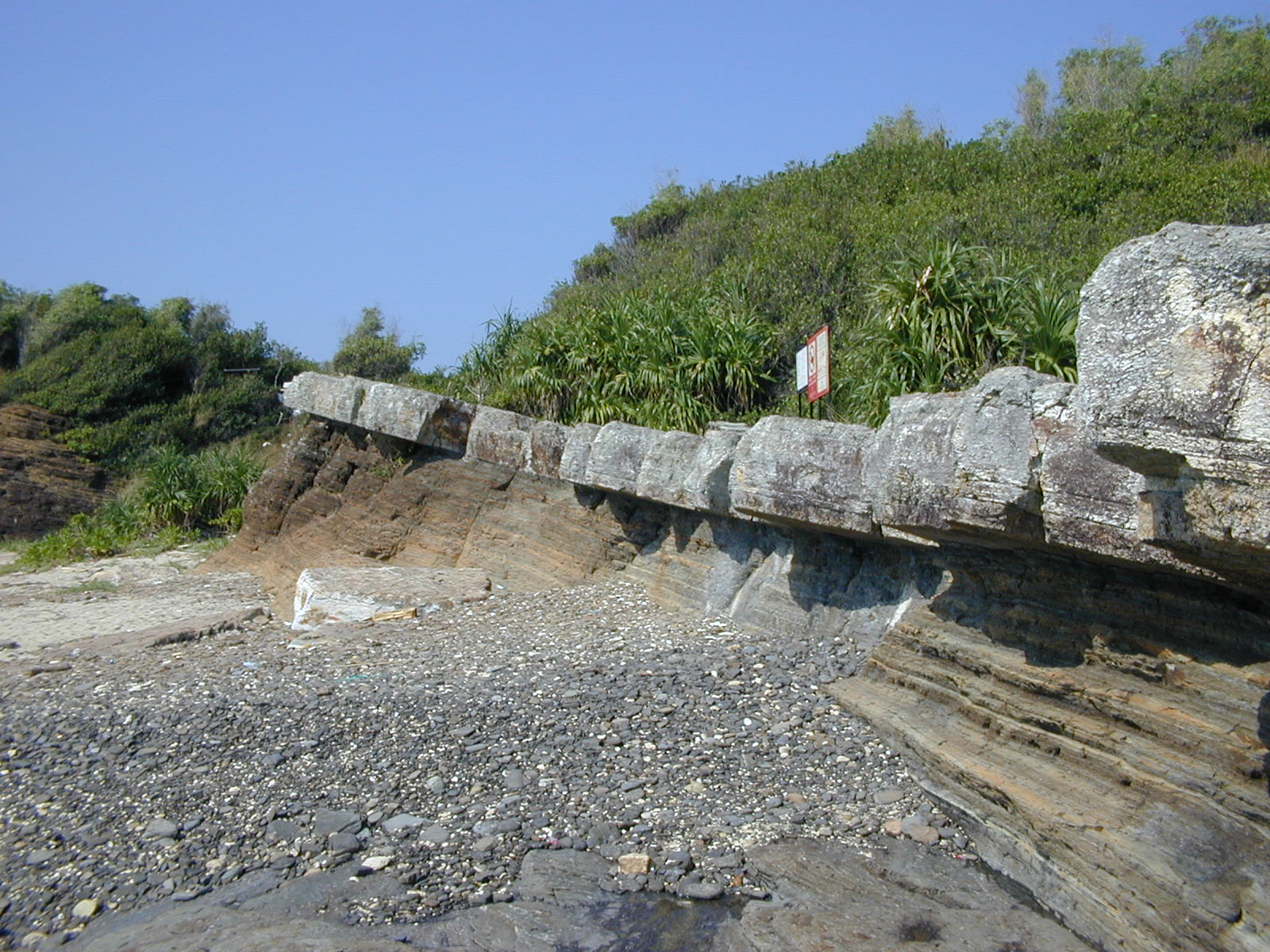
Tung Ping Chau

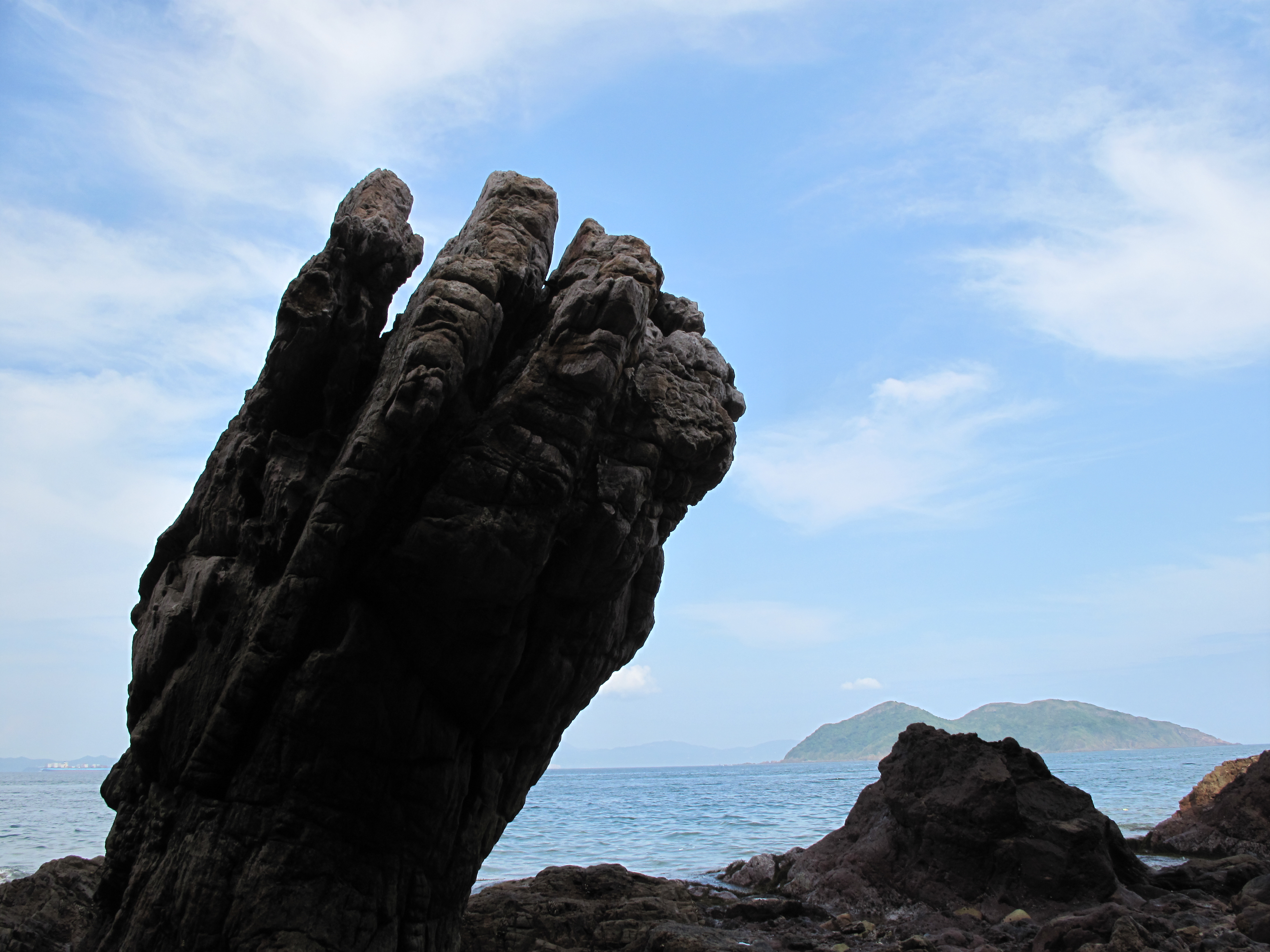
Devil's Fist at Bluff Head (Wong Chuk Kok Tsui)

Hong Kong UNESCO Global Geopark (Chinese: 香港聯合國教科文組織世界地質公園), formerly Hong Kong National Geopark (香港國家地質公園), was inaugurated on 3 November 2009. It is a single entity of land area over 150 km^{2} across parts of the eastern and northeastern New Territories. On 18 September 2011, UNESCO listed the geopark as part of its Global Geoparks Network.

The Hong Kong UNESCO Global Geopark consists of two geological regions:

- the Sai Kung Volcanic Rock Region, with its widely distributed tuff volcanic rocks displaying prismatic columnar jointing, which are of international geological significance
- the Northeast New Territories Sedimentary Rock Region, which comprises sedimentary rocks formed in different geologic periods, showcasing the complete geological history of Hong Kong.

== History ==
In 2008, the Hong Kong government commissioned a study to investigate the feasibility of establishing a geopark. The study identified two suitable regions, namely the north-eastern New Territories and Sai Kung. The government subsequently set up a geopark to cover both regions. The geopark was formally inaugurated by Chief Executive Donald Tsang on 3 November 2009.

== Sai Kung Volcanic Rock Region ==
=== High Island ===
High Island (糧船灣) is the home of the columnar-jointed volcanic tuff. Most of the columns are sub-vertical, straight-sided and parallel. It covers a large area around Sai Kung Peninsula in the eastern part of Hong Kong, including High Island Reservoir and Tai Long Wan.

=== Ung Kong Group ===
Ung Kong Island Group (甕缸群島) is located in southeastern Hong Kong, immediately to the south of the High Island peninsula and to the northwest of the Ninepin group of islands. It consists of Wang Chau (橫洲), Basalt Island (火石洲) and Bluff Island (沙塘口山). Columnar-jointed rocks underlie these islands, giving their cliff coastline a distinctive appearance, and leading to the development of many sea caves and sea arches.

=== Ninepin Group ===
Ninepin Group (果洲群島) is located on the eastern side of Hong Kong, forms a series of offshore islands. Numerous inclined columnar jointed volcanic rocks create cliffs and coastal scenery around the Ninepin Group. Columns in the Ninepin Group are as large as 3-meters in diameter.

=== Sharp Island ===
Sharp Island (橋咀洲) is located in the Port Shelter, to the southeast of the Sai Kung Town, from where it can easily be reached by small boat. The island is underlain by older volcanic-related sedimentary rocks. There is a tombolo reaching to a small island nearby at low tide.

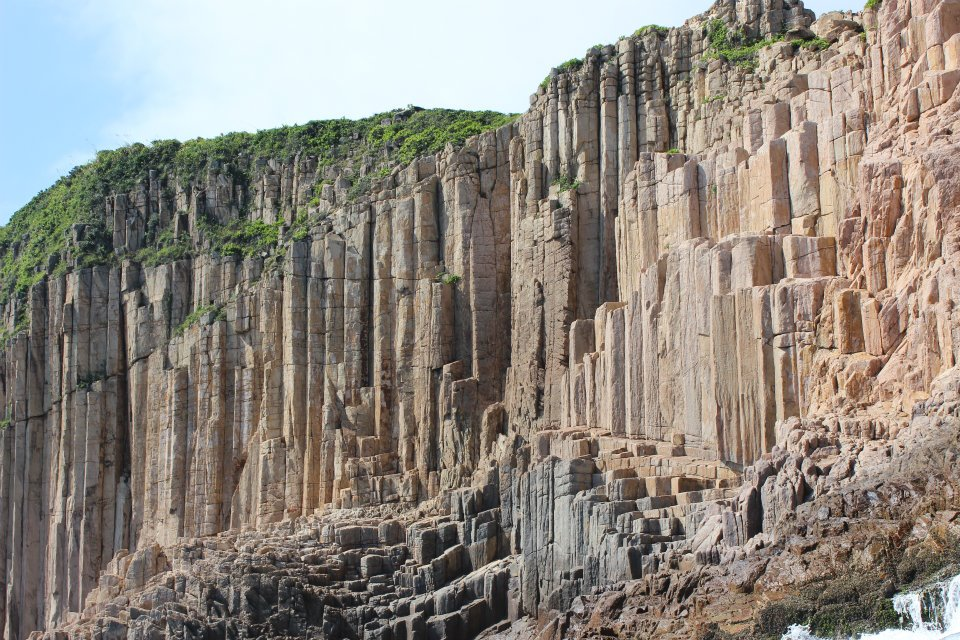
Columnar jointing near the High Island Reservoir East Dam

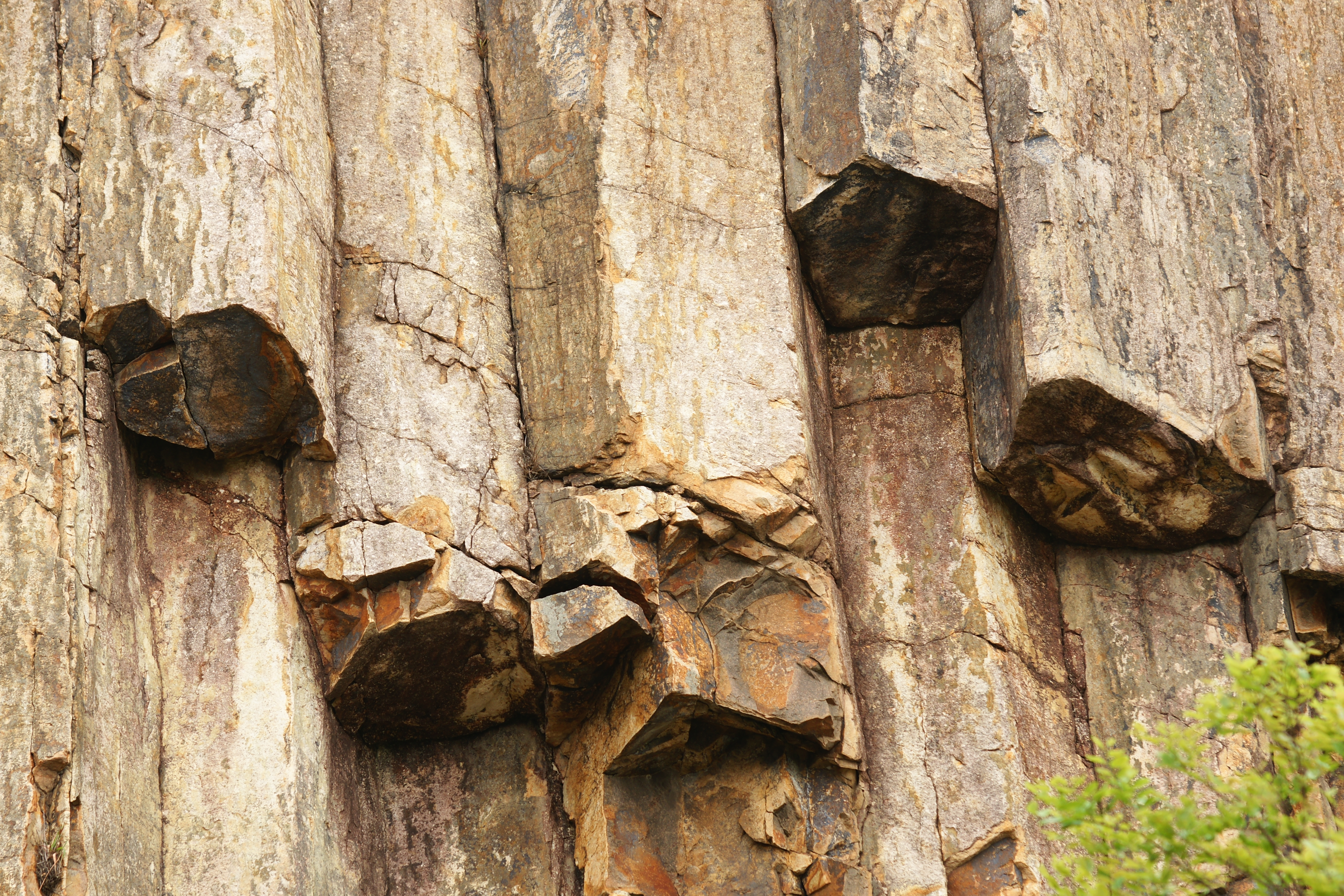
Columnar jointing near the High Island Reservoir East Dam

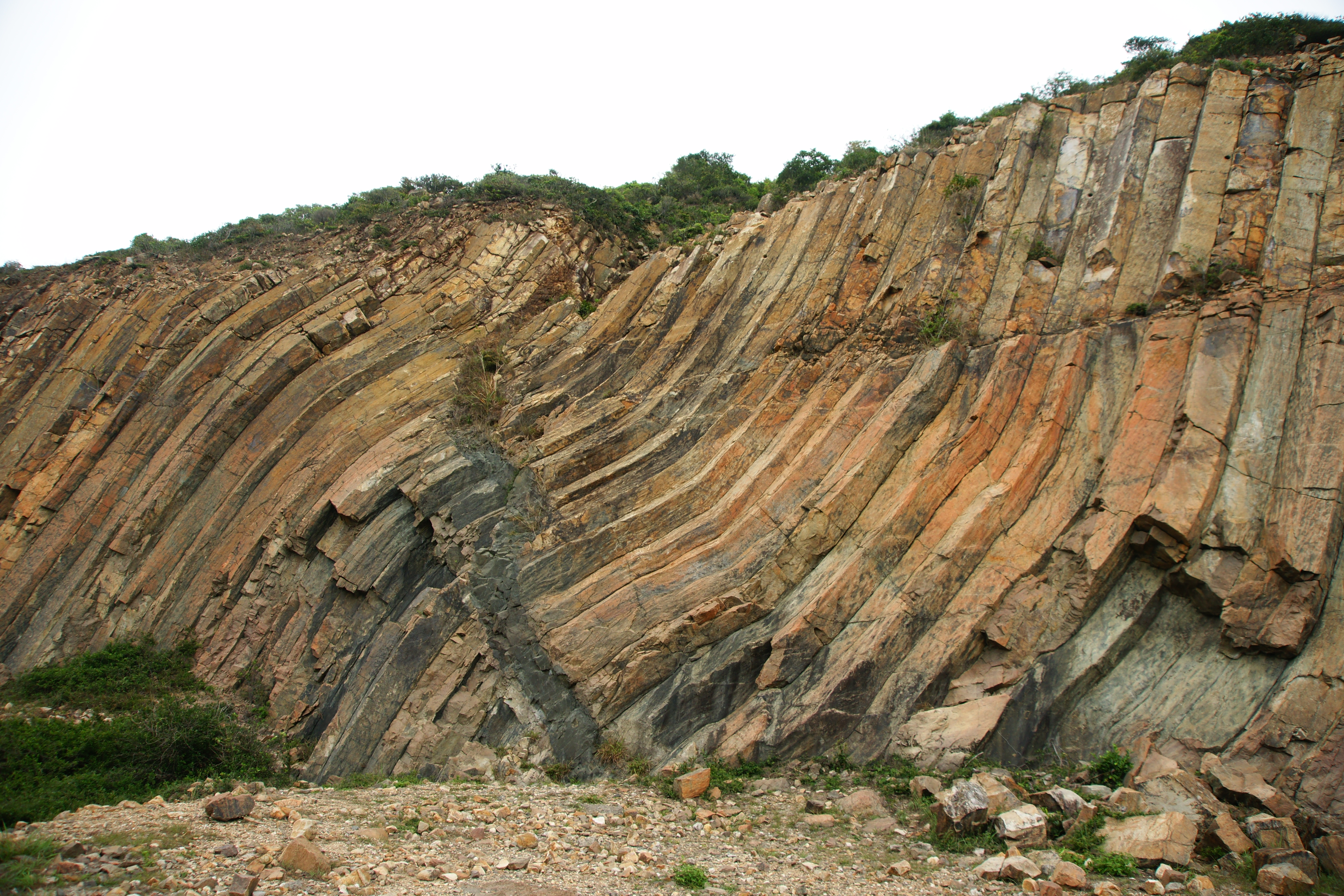
Twisted columnar jointing near the High Island Reservoir East Dam

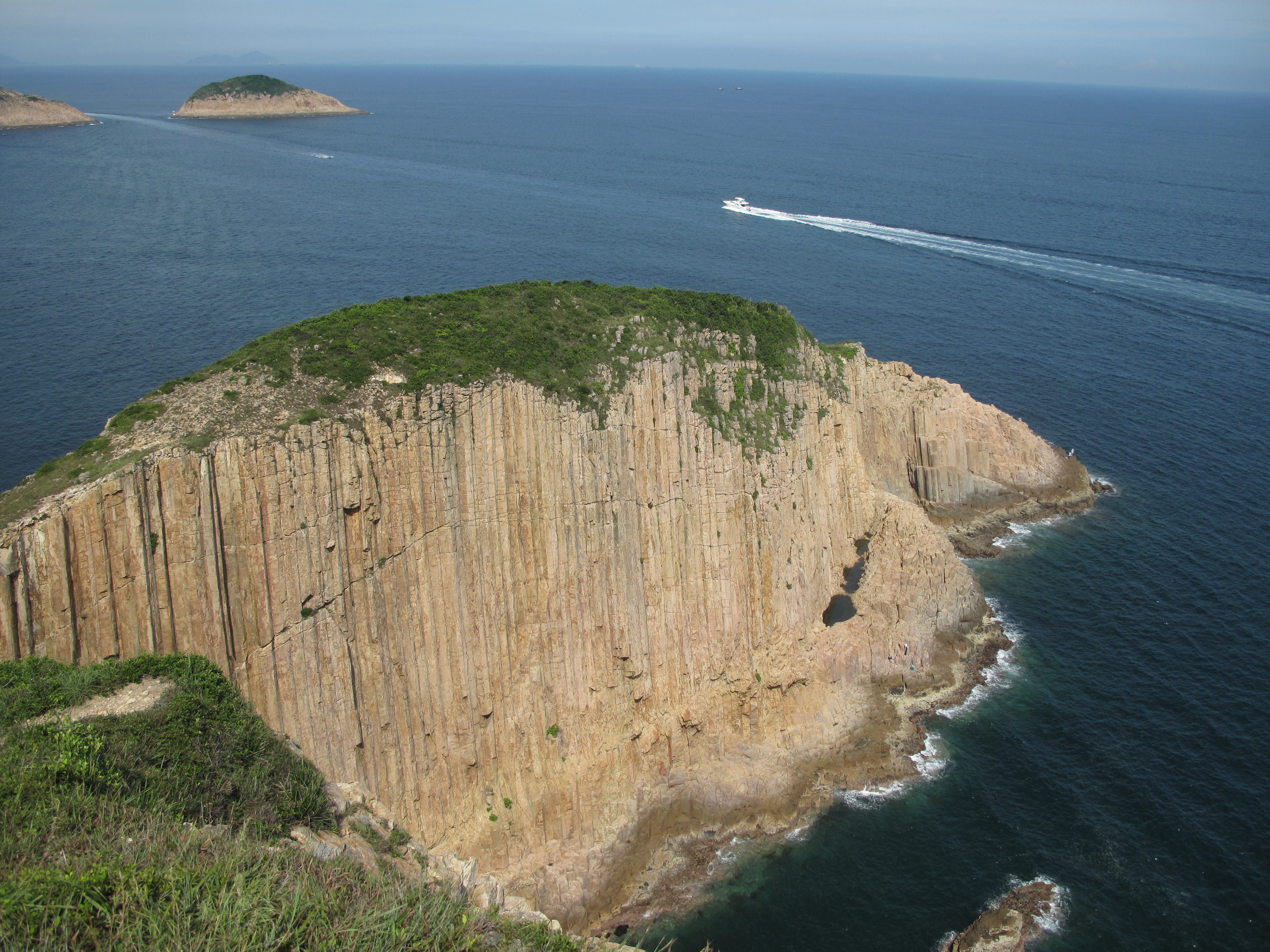
Po Pin Chau, a stack island near the High Island Reservoir East Dam

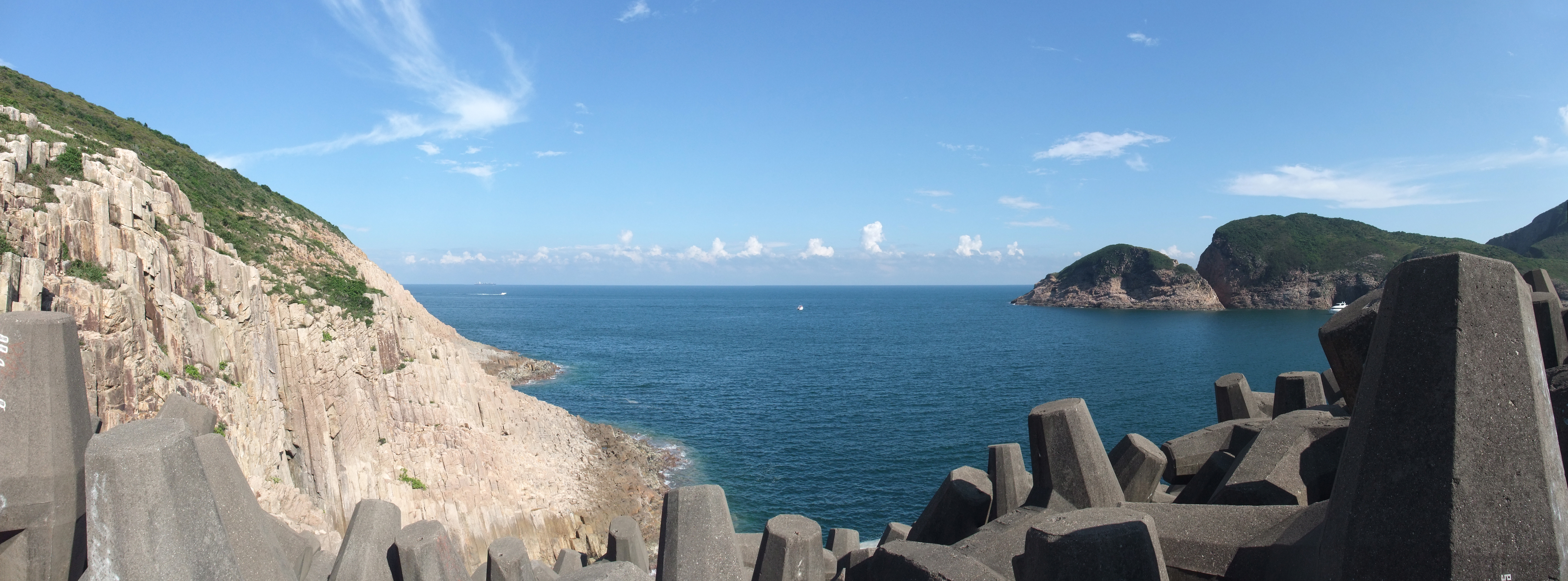
Columnar jointing near Po Pin Chau (not to be confused with the dark-colored dolosse in the foreground)

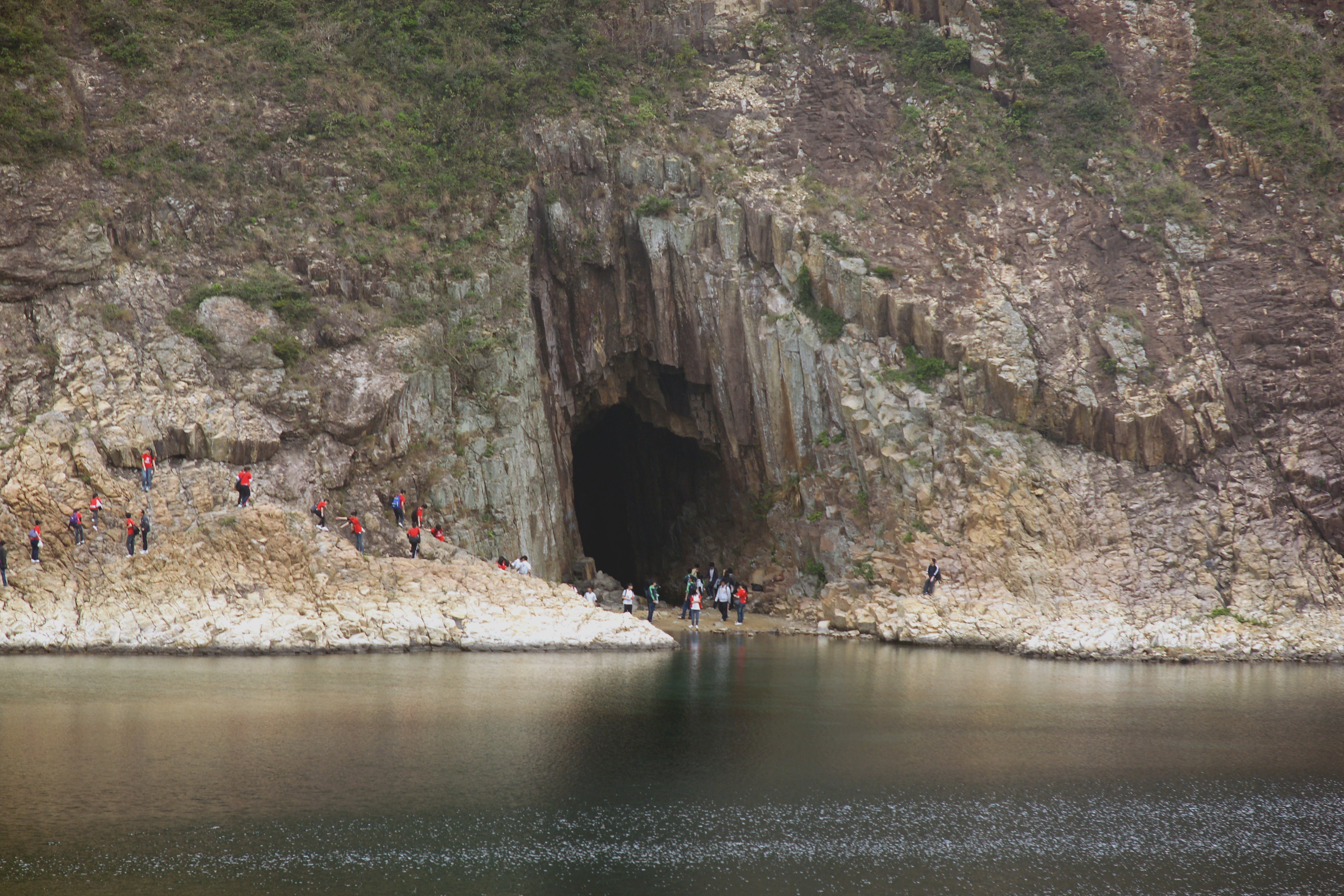
Sea Cave near the High Island Reservoir East Dam

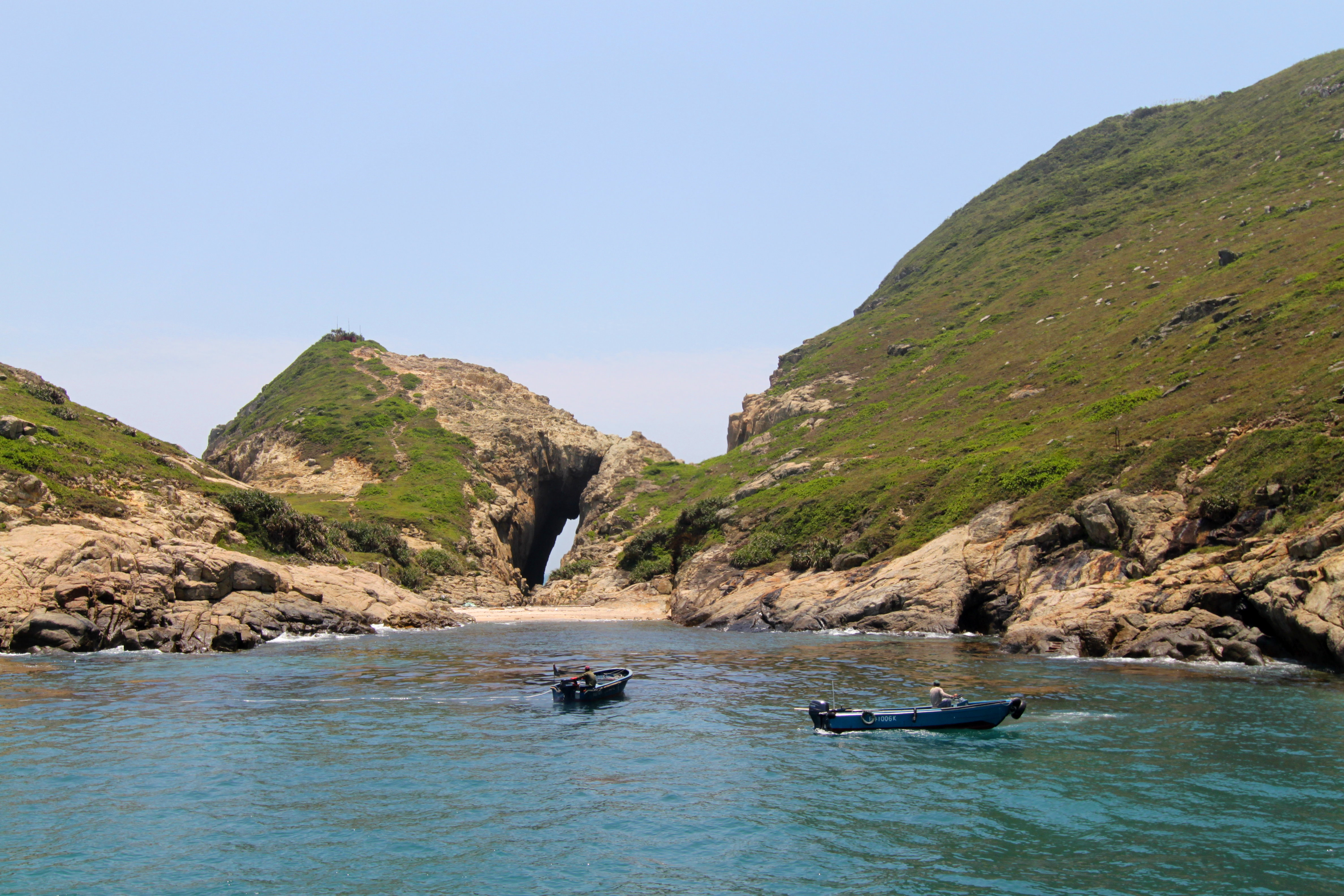
South Ninepin Island

== Northeast New Territories Sedimentary Rock Region ==
=== Double Haven and Port Island ===
Double Haven or Yan Chau Tong (印洲塘) is a harbour hugged by Double Island, Crescent Island and Crooked Island with north-eastern New Territories. It contains many deep red coloured rocks formed during a period of global warming in Tertiary. Oxidation rate of iron increased due to higher temperature and humidity, forming the iron oxide (rust)

Port Island (赤洲), as the Chinese name Chek Chau implies, Port Island is a place of red earth. The ground on the entire island is rust-coloured conglomerate and siltstone formed similarly during Teritary.

In 2024, experts announced the discovery of the first dinosaur fossils in Hong Kong after bones embedded in a Cretaceous-era rock in Port Island were recovered.

=== North and south coasts of Tolo Channel ===
The area includes the north and south shores of Tolo Channel. The oldest rocks in Hong Kong, the Bluff Head formation, formed about 400 million years ago during the Devonian Period, are at the northeastern tip of the Tolo channel. Various deformation and erosion features can be seen from these rocks. One of the famous features is the Devil's fist formed by weathering and erosion along the sandstone bedding forming the shape of the “Ghost fingers”.

Ma Shi Chau (馬屎洲) presents the sedimentary rocks formed about 280 million years ago. Various fossils such as ammonites, corals and bivalves were found on Ma Shi Chau. Sitting right next to the Tolo Channel fault system, various sheared features and folds can be observed.

Lai Chi Chong (荔枝莊) showcases various volcanic rocks and sedimentary rocks formed about 146 million years ago. The siltstone beds were interbedded with volcanic tuffite. Tuffite is a sedimentary rock with a volcanic origin. It formed by fine volcanic ash deposited in water, forming a sedimentary bed of volcanic ash. Other than that, there is also a black cherty mudstone on Lai Chi Chong, which is believed to be formed by mud deposited together with silica-rich materials. The black color indicated an oxygen depleted deposition environment. These black mudstones beds exhibits a slump fold structure. Large coherent mass of loosely consolidated materials might have slid down along a slope and folded the mudstone beds.

=== Tung Ping Chau ===
Tung Ping Chau (東平洲) sits in Mirs Bay in northeastern Hong Kong. It is the easternmost outlying island of Hong Kong. Tung Ping Chau is a popular holiday destination for locals. Its attractions, such as wave erosion landscape, the shale that resembles a sponge cake structure and the unusually flat lay of the island itself, draw thousands of visitors annually.

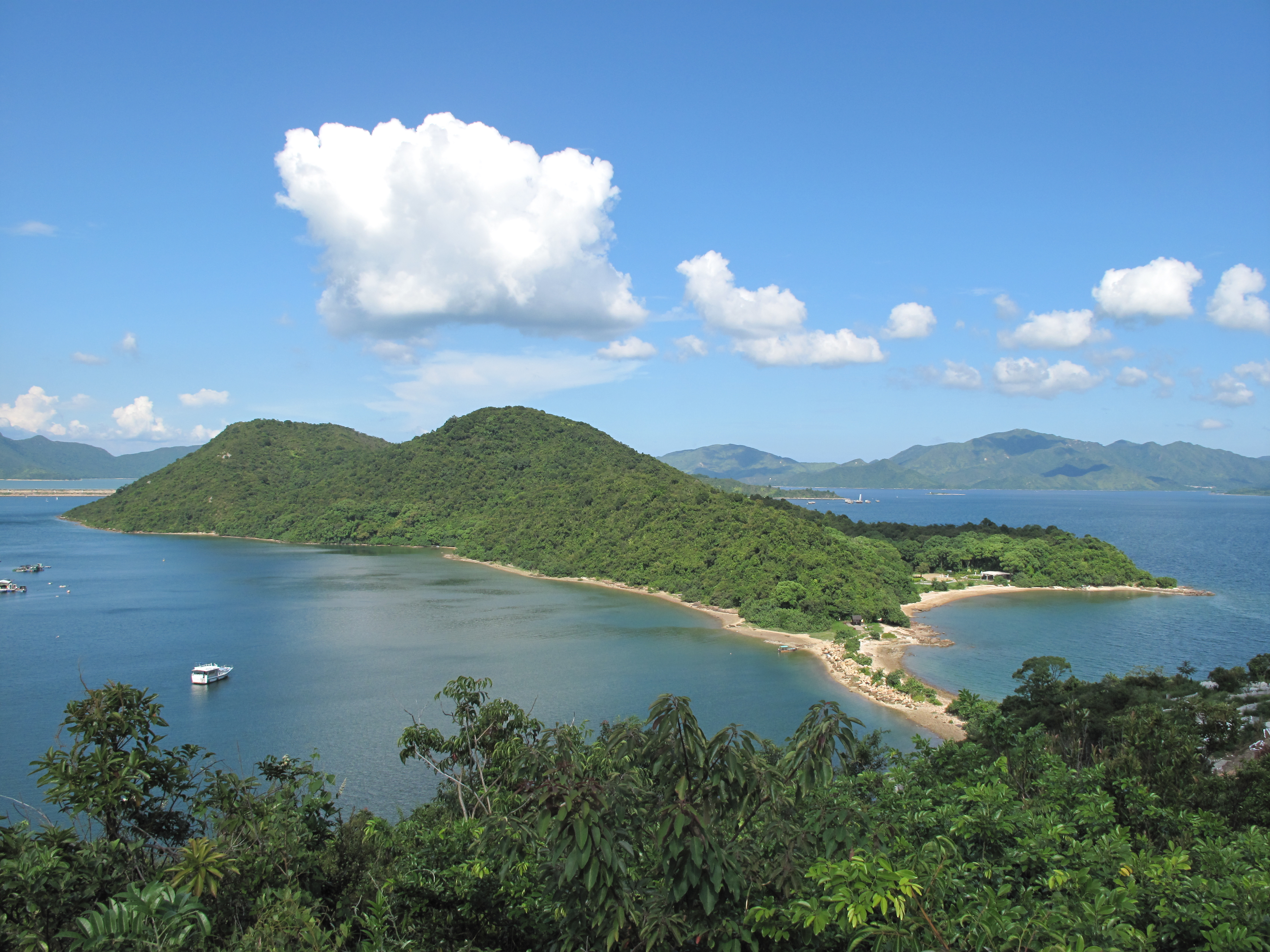
Ma Shi Chau

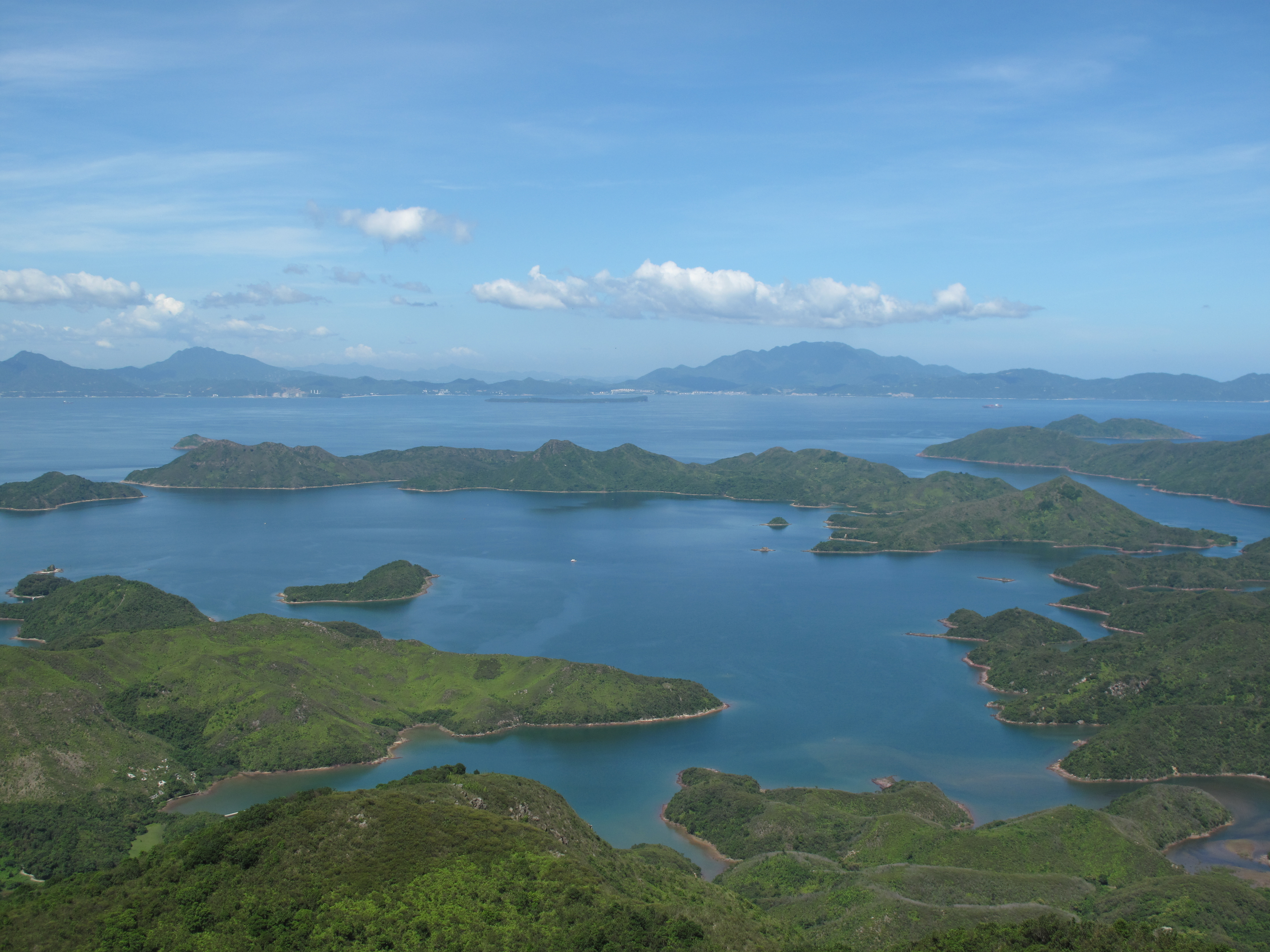
Double Haven

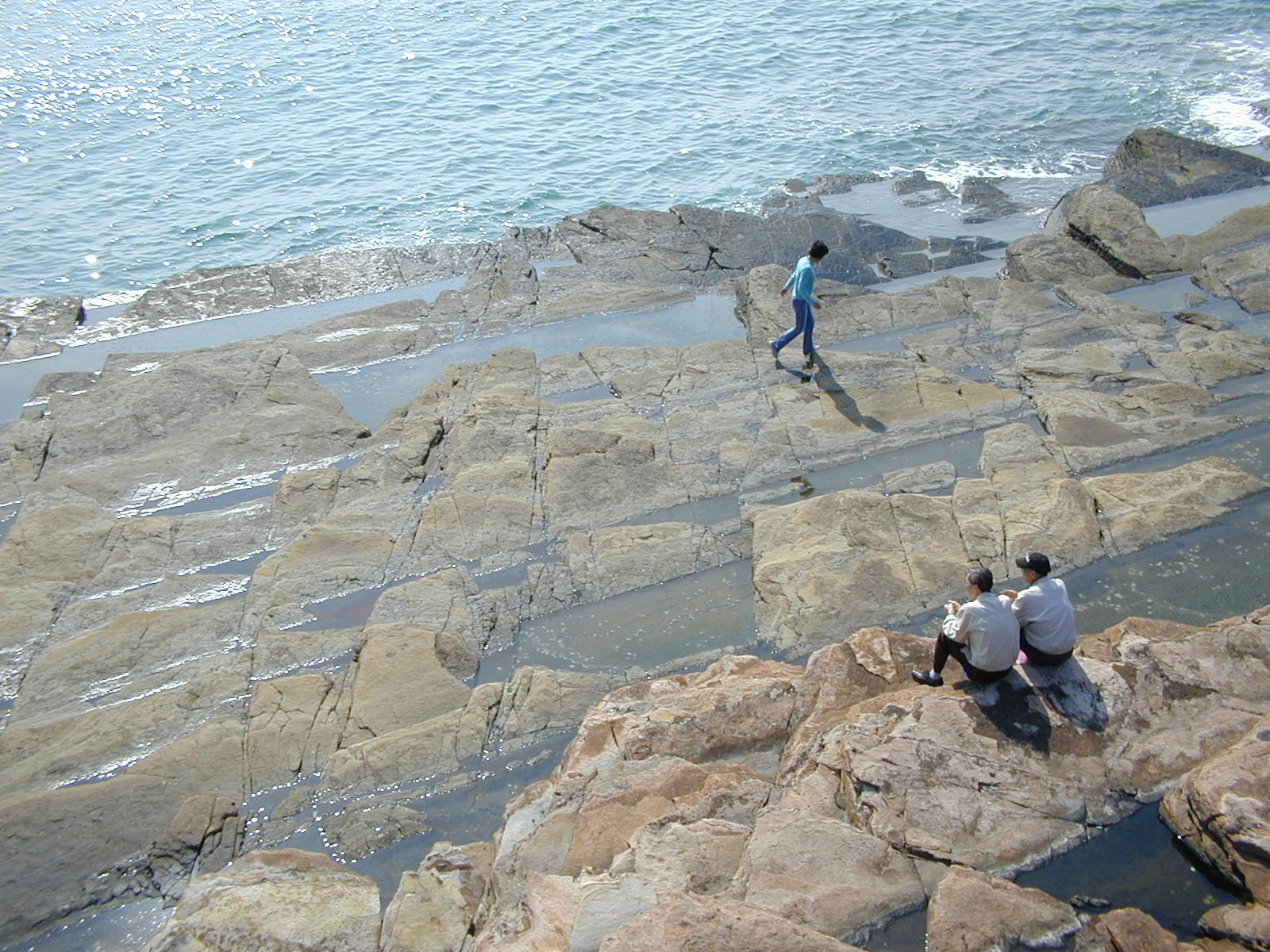
A wave-cut platform on Tung Ping Chau

== See also ==
- Geology of Hong Kong
- Conservation in Hong Kong
- Protected areas of China
- List of National Geoparks
- Lai Chi Wo
