= Bluff Island (Hong Kong) =

Island in Port Shelter, Hong Kong

Coordinates: 22.320609°N 114.350834°E

Bluff Island, indigenously known as Sha Tong Hau Shan (Chinese: 沙塘口山), also known as Ung Kong (甕缸), is an island in Port Shelter, south of Sai Kung Peninsula of Hong Kong. It is an important area for corals and other marine life. The island is zoned as Site of Special Scientific Interest since 1979. The surrounding water has not yet been legally protected and thus the corals are damaged by anchors of holiday visitors.

== Geography ==
The elongate Bluff Island, which is oriented northeast to southwest, reaches a maximum elevation of a little over 140 meters. The island is asymmetrical, forming a high ridge on the south-eastern side with a cliffed coastline. In contrast, the north-western aspect of the island slopes more gently towards a rocky coastline. The 140-meter high cliffs that fringe the south-eastern-facing coast of Bluff Island are the highest sea cliffs in Hong Kong.

Fan Tap Pai (番塔排) in the south of the Island is one of the most spectacular coastal scenes in Hong Kong. This huge sea cave cuts right through the island and it is just wide enough for a boat to sail past.

An open U-shaped bay, Ung Kong Wan (甕缸灣), is located at the north of the island.

== Conservation ==
Together with Basalt Island and Wang Chau, Bluff Island forms the Ung Kong Group (甕缸群島) and is part of Hong Kong National Geopark.

The Ung Kong Group Special Area (甕缸群島特別地區) covers 176.8 hectares and was designated in 2011. It consists of Basalt Island, Bluff Island, Wang Chau, their surrounding islets, and Kam Chung Ngam (金鐘岩) in the southern part of Jin Island. The geology of the area is characterised by volcanic rocks of the Cretaceous periods.

== See also ==
- List of islands and peninsulas of Hong Kong
- Outlying Islands
