= Pak Wai, Sai Kung District =

Village in Hong Kong

Coordinates: 22.359914°N 114.254598°E

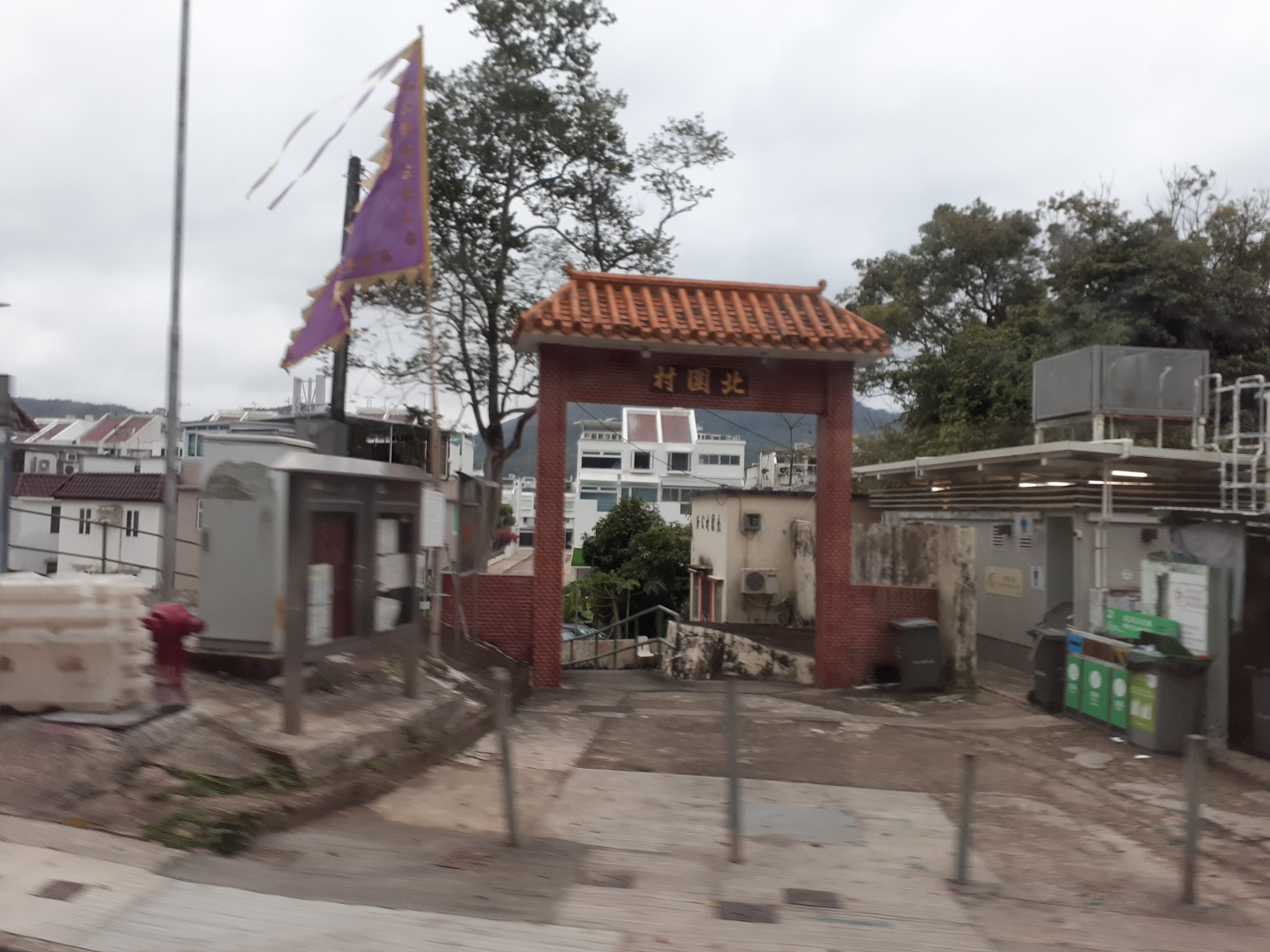
Entrance gate of Pak Wai, viewed from Hiram's Highway.

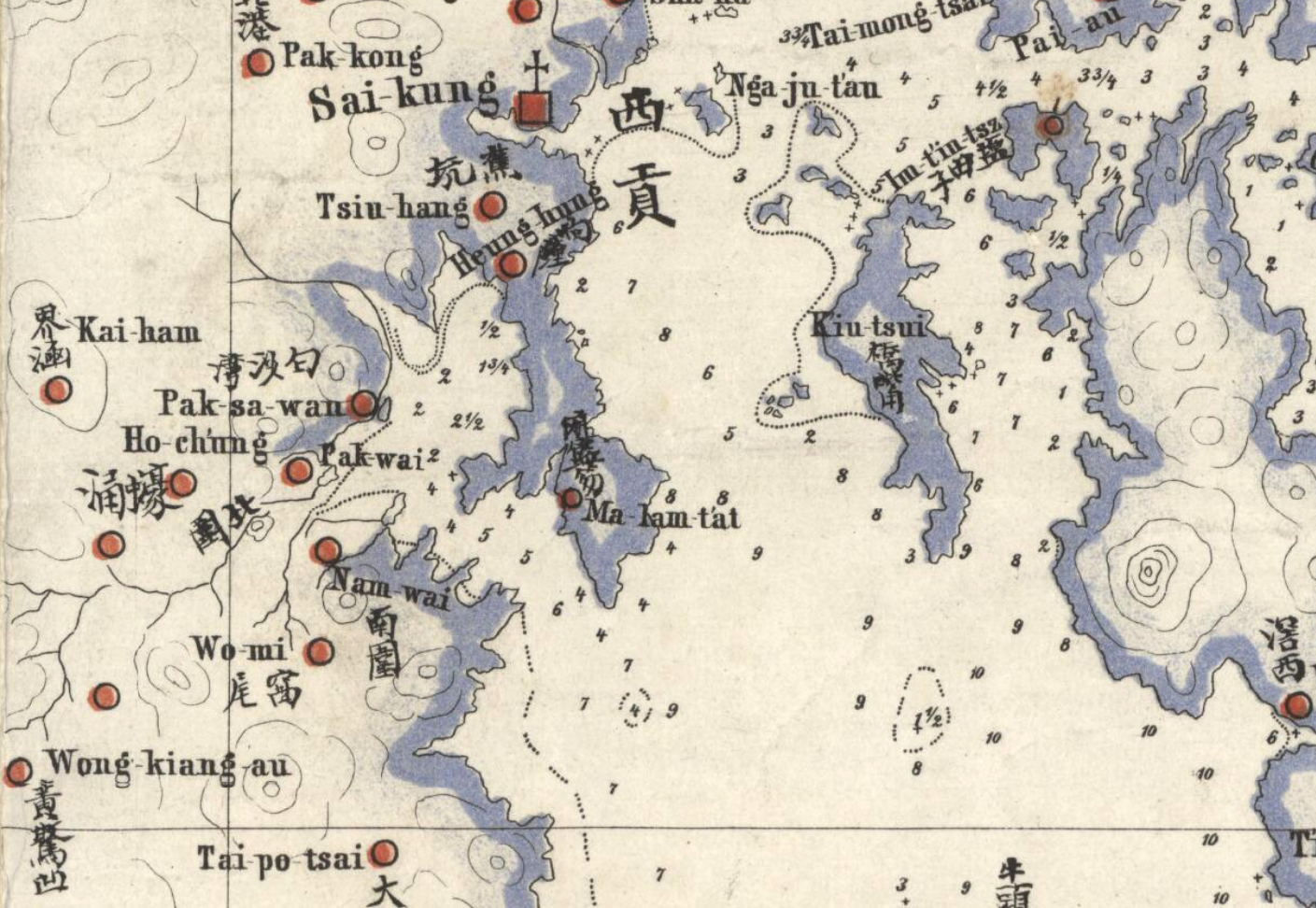
Pak Wai on the "Map of the San-On District" by Simeone Volonteri (1866).

Pak Wai (Chinese: 北圍) is a village in the Hebe Haven area of Sai Kung District, Hong Kong. It is located along Hiram's Highway, next to the Marina Cove housing development.

== Administration ==
Pak Wai is a recognized village under the New Territories Small House Policy.

== History ==
Pak Wai is a mixed clan village, probably established in the late 17th century. It appears on the "Map of the San-On District", published in 1866 by Simeone Volonteri.

== See also ==
- Nearby villages: Heung Chung, Ho Chung, Nam Wai, Pak Sha Wan Village, Wo Mei
