= Kau Sai Chau =

Island of Hong Kong

Coordinates: 22°21′35″N 114°18′51″E

滘西洲
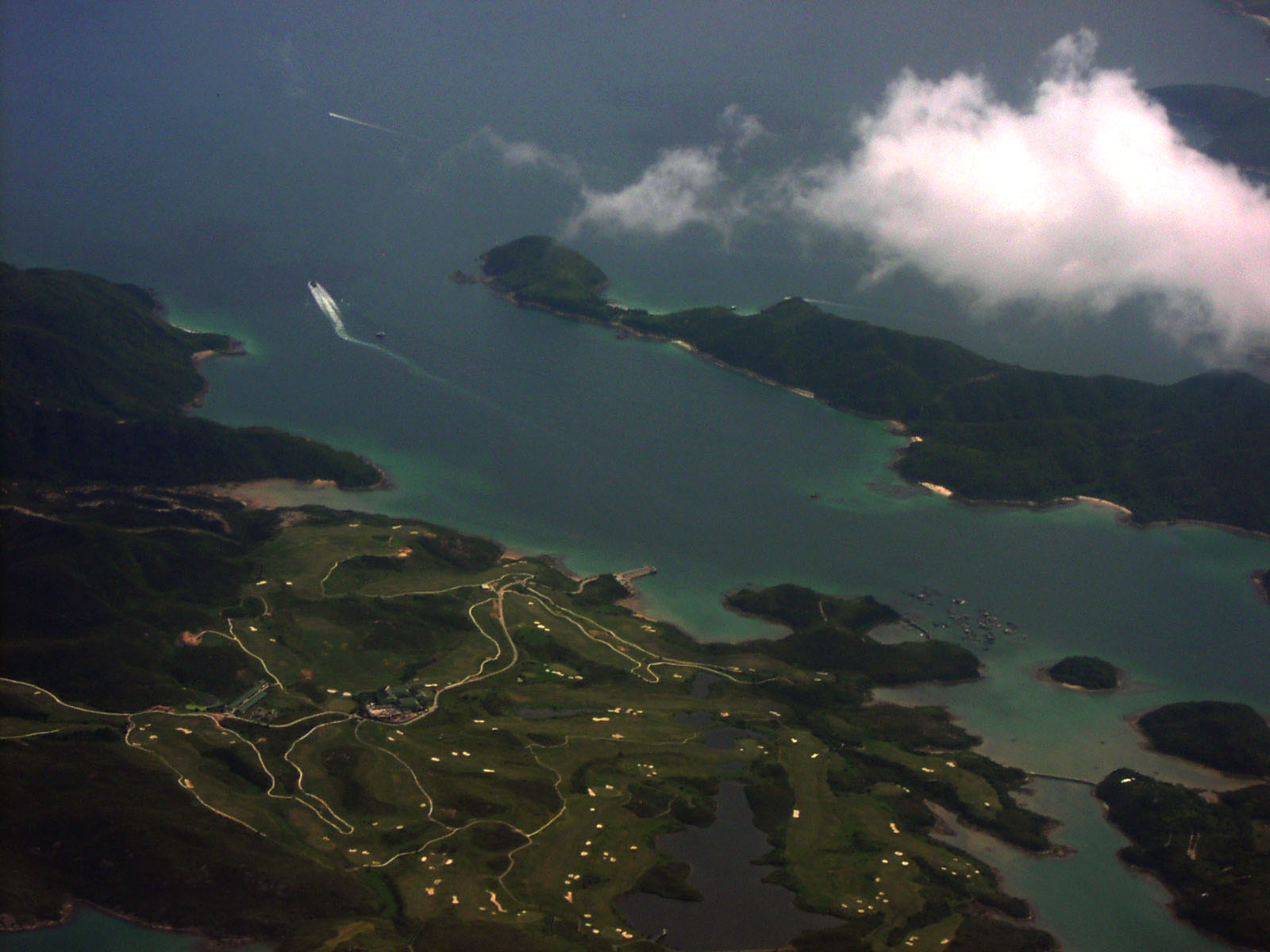
- Kau Sai Chau and its golf course. Yim Tin Tsai and the breakwater are visible at the bottom right. The island at the centre right is Sharp Island.

- Location of Kau Sai Chau within Hong Kong (red)

Geography
- Location: Sai Kung
- Area: 6.70 km^{2} (2.59 sq mi)
- Highest elevation: 216 m (709 ft)

Administration
- Hong Kong

Chinese name
- Chinese: 滘西洲
- Jyutping: Gaau^{3} sai^{1} zau^{1}
- Cantonese Yale: Gaau sāi jāu
- Hanyu Pinyin: Jiàoxīzhōu
Transcriptions
Standard Mandarin
- Hanyu Pinyin: Jiàoxīzhōu
Yue: Cantonese
- Yale Romanization: Gaau sāi jāu
- Jyutping: Gaau^{3} sai^{1} zau^{1}

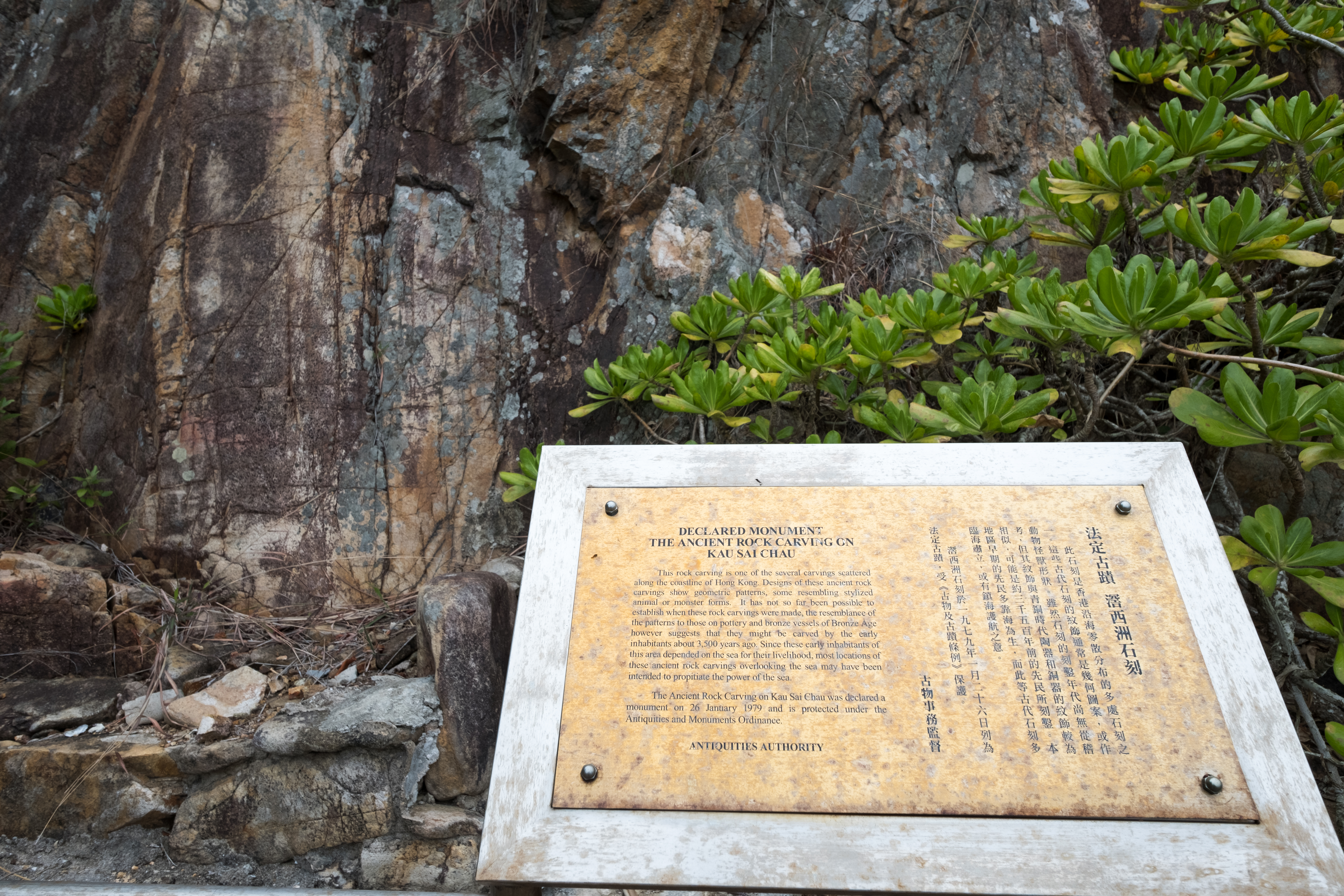
Rock Carving at Kau Sai Chau.

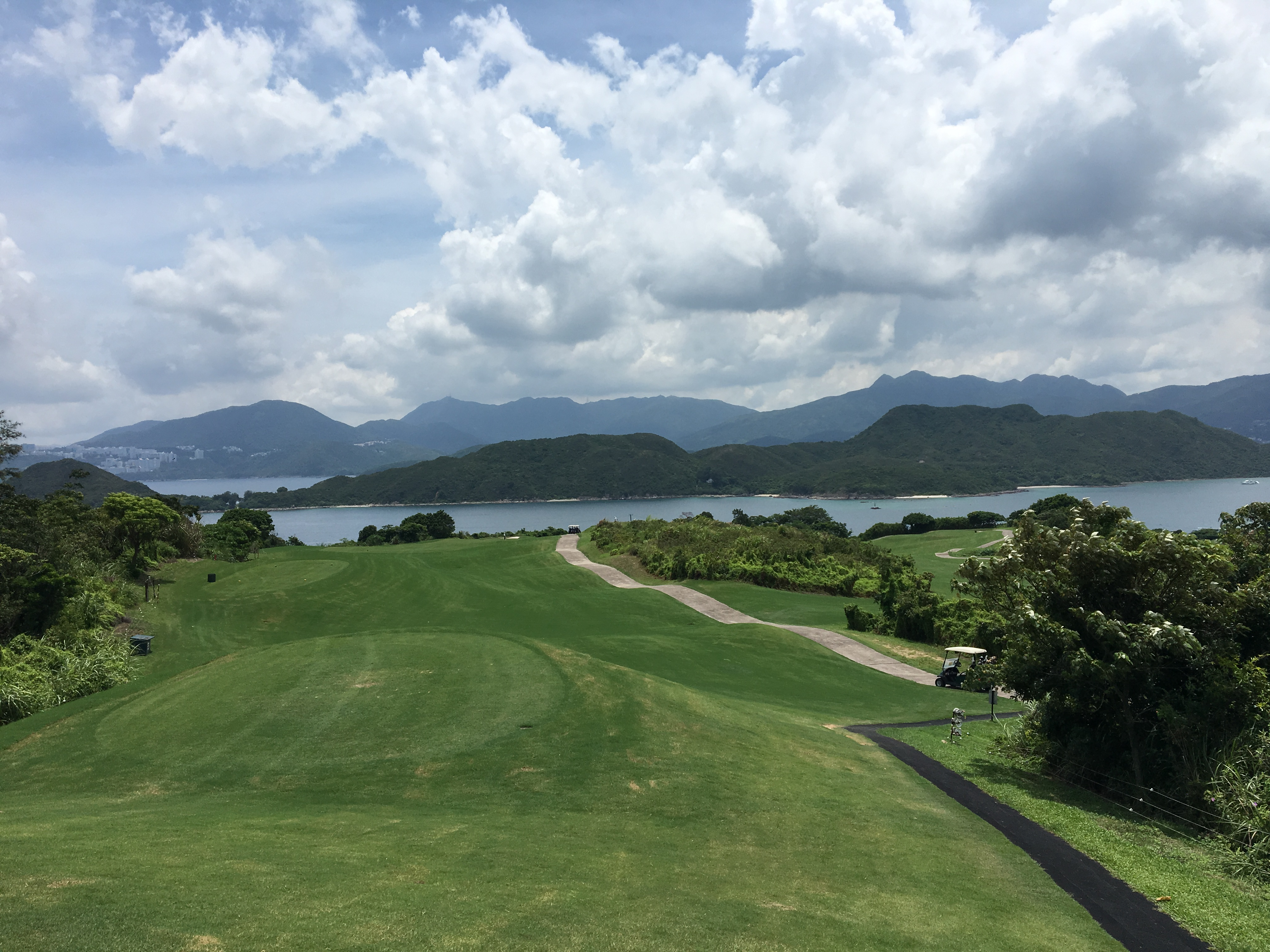
Kau Sai Chau Golf Club South Course Hole Number 12.

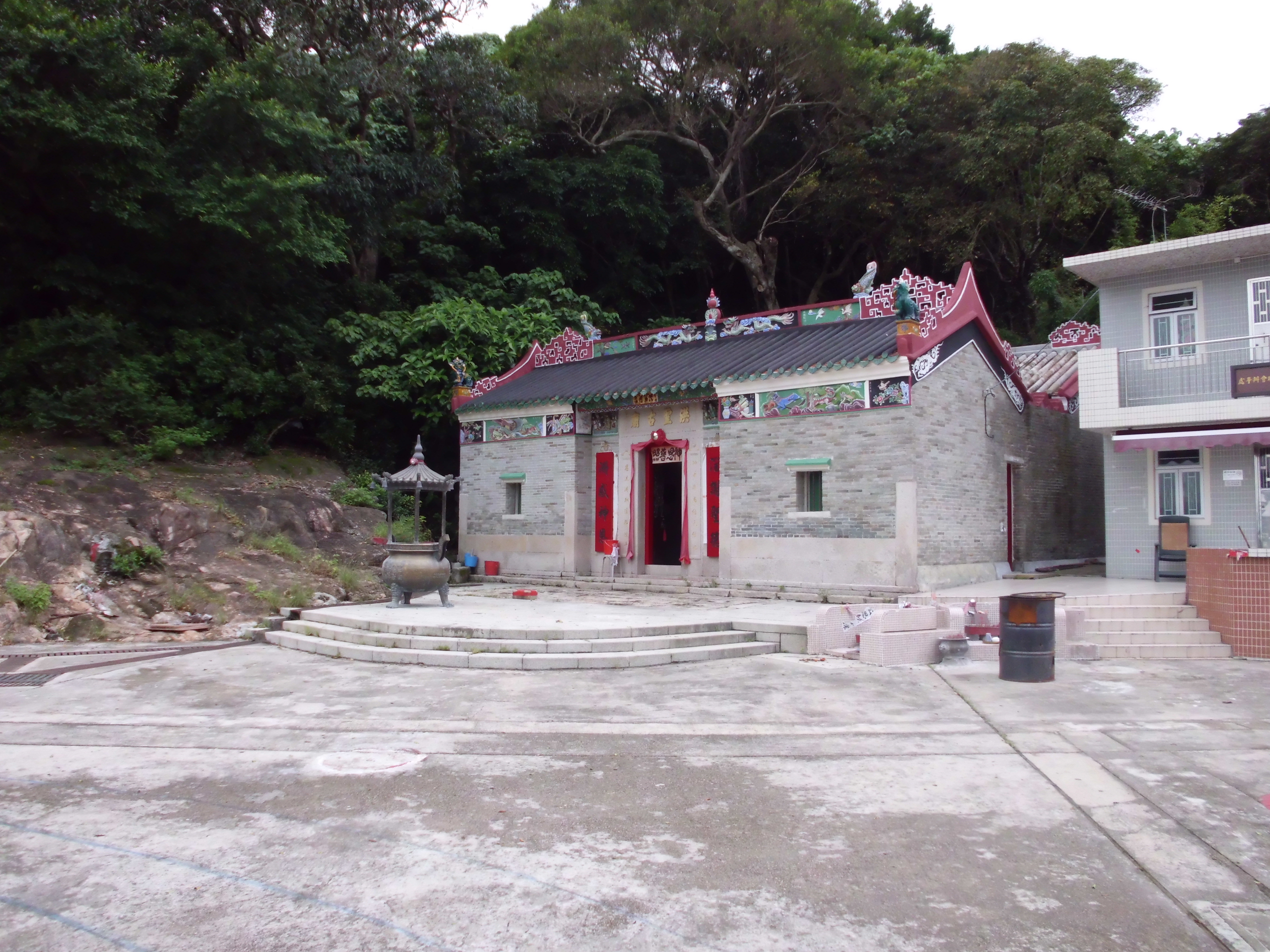
Hung Shing Temple at Kau Sai Chau.

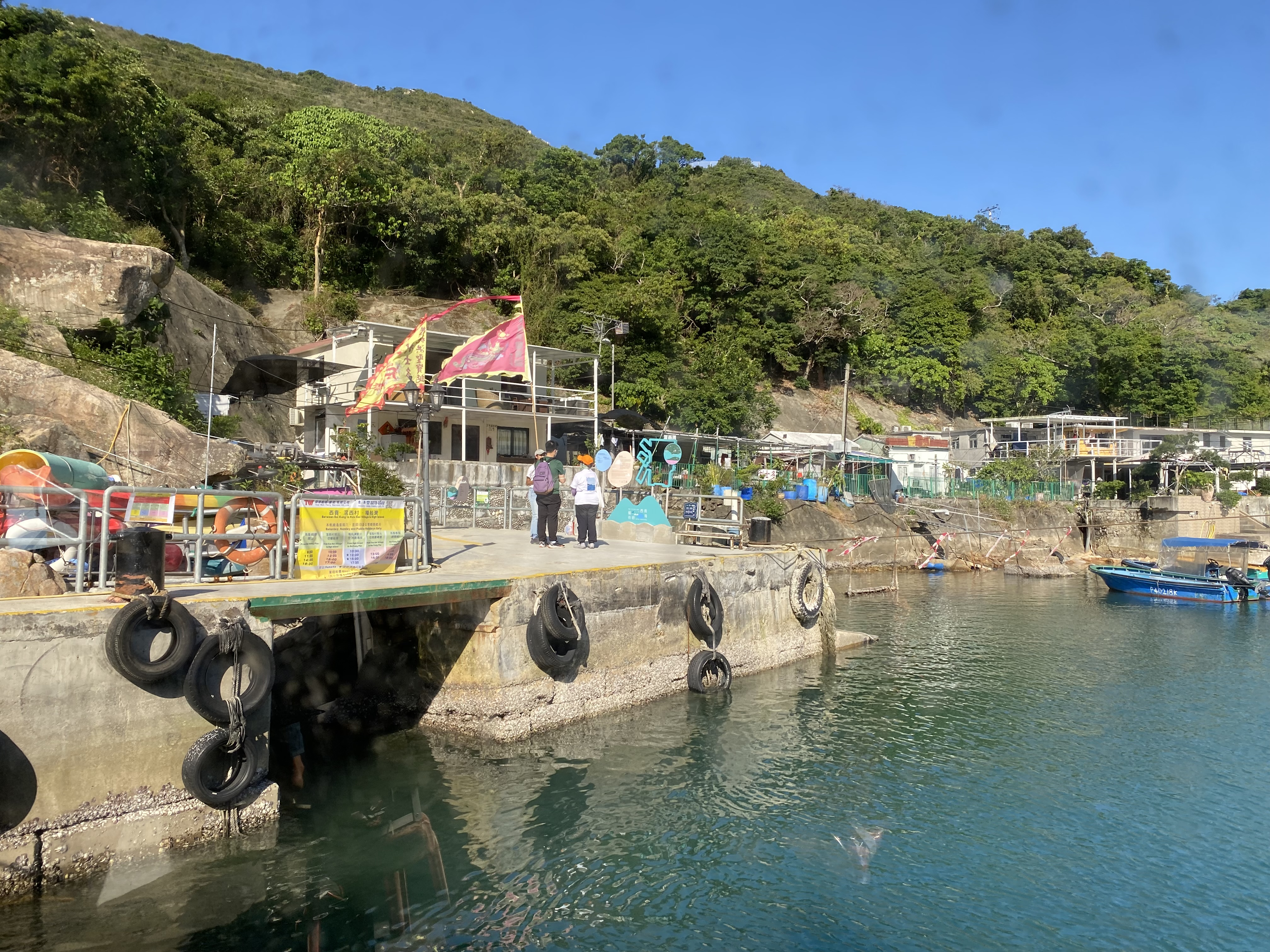
Kau Sai Village Pier.

Kau Sai Chau is an island located off the coast of Sai Kung Peninsula, Hong Kong, with an area of 6.70 km^{2}, making it the 6th largest island of Hong Kong. It is under the administration of Sai Kung District.

The island was formerly known as Keui Island. 'Kau Sai Chau', the transliteration of the Chinese name through the Hong Kong Government Cantonese Romanisation system, was later adopted as its English name.

== Geography ==
Kau Sai Chau is located south of the Sai Kung Peninsula. Its northern shore forms part of the southern limit of Port Shelter Sheltered Water, of which it is the largest island. Kau Sai Chau is connected in the north by a breakwater to the smaller island Yim Tin Tsai. The southern tip of the island is separated by a narrow channel from Jin Island. It has a maximum elevation of 216 m.

Kau Sai Fishermen Village is a small fishing hamlet with about ten houses. It is located at the southern tip of the island.

== History ==
At the time of the 1911 census, the population of Kau Sai Chau was 39. The number of males was 29.

In 1952, Hakka farmers and shopkeepers of Kau Sai Chau were required to relocate, because the place was located in the centre of a large area of sea about to be designated as a military firing range. The villagers were resited to Kau Sai San Tsuen, off Hiram's Highway at Pak Sha Wan.

== Culture ==
Two declared monuments of Hong Kong are located on Kau Sai Chau: a prehistoric rock carving and a Hung Shing Temple.

The prehistoric rock carving was discovered in 1976. It is located on the north-western coast of the island, in a location "where accessibility by land is extremely poor".

The Hung Shing Temple is located in the southern part of the island, near Kau Sai Fishermen Village, of which it is the only temple. The building was built before 1889. It is constructed in grey bricks with a timber roof frame. The temple has been renovated four times, in 1949, in the 1970s, in 1988 and the last being from August 1999 to February 2000. The restoration was declared an "Outstanding Project" by the UNESCO Asia-Pacific Heritage 2000 Awards. Previously a Grade III Historic Building, the temple was declared a monument on 15 November 2002.

The Hung Shing Festival (洪聖誕) is celebrated there every year on the 12th and the 13th days of the second lunar month in Chinese calendar. An opera troupe is hired to perform Cantonese operas to thank the deities. The Jiao Festival is conducted on the day before the festival.

== Leisure amenities ==
The Jockey Club Kau Sai Chau Public Golf Course, developed and run by the Hong Kong Jockey Club, is the only public golf course in Hong Kong. Opened in 1995, it occupies approximately the northern half of the island. It comprises three 18-hole golf courses: the North and South Courses were designed by Gary Player, while Nelson & Haworth designed the East Course.

There are wild boars wandering the island. They come out typically at night and may cause serious damage to the golf course.

== Transportation ==
A scheduled ferry service connects Sai Kung Town and the ferry pier of the Public Golf Course. The Hong Kong Jockey Club runs three Solar Sailor ferries to the island per hour.

Other parts of the island may be reached by privately owned boats from Sai Kung Pier.

== Climate ==
Climate data for Kau Sai Chau (2009–2020)
Month	Jan	Feb	Mar	Apr	May	Jun	Jul	Aug	Sep	Oct	Nov	Dec	Year
Mean daily maximum °C (°F)	18.9 (66.0)	19.8 (67.6)	21.6 (70.9)	25.3 (77.5)	28.8 (83.8)	31.2 (88.2)	32.1 (89.8)	32.2 (90.0)	31.1 (88.0)	28.4 (83.1)	25.0 (77.0)	20.5 (68.9)	26.2 (79.2)
Daily mean °C (°F)	15.2 (59.4)	16.1 (61.0)	18.3 (64.9)	22.1 (71.8)	25.5 (77.9)	27.8 (82.0)	28.5 (83.3)	28.2 (82.8)	27.4 (81.3)	24.8 (76.6)	21.2 (70.2)	16.6 (61.9)	22.6 (72.8)
Mean daily minimum °C (°F)	12.5 (54.5)	13.6 (56.5)	15.9 (60.6)	19.4 (66.9)	23.2 (73.8)	25.4 (77.7)	25.7 (78.3)	25.4 (77.7)	24.8 (76.6)	22.1 (71.8)	18.8 (65.8)	13.9 (57.0)	20.1 (68.1)
Average precipitation mm (inches)	45.7 (1.80)	34.5 (1.36)	83.2 (3.28)	144.7 (5.70)	351.4 (13.83)	392.1 (15.44)	281.9 (11.10)	238.9 (9.41)	181.5 (7.15)	128.5 (5.06)	48.8 (1.92)	25.4 (1.00)	1,956.6 (77.05)
Average relative humidity (%)	75.6	80.6	83.7	85.1	86.4	84.7	82.3	83.4	80.7	75.4	76.9	69.2	80.3
Source: Hong Kong Observatory

== See also ==
- List of islands and peninsulas of Hong Kong
