= Tsiu Hang =

Tsiu Hang is the name of several places in Hong Kong:

- Tsiu Hang, North District, a village in Sha Tau Kok, North District
- Tsiu Hang, Sai Kung District, a village and an area in Sai Kung District
- Tsiu Hang, Tai Po District, an area in Tai Po District
