= Mok Tse Che =

Village in Hong Kong

Coordinates: 22.348492°N 114.250186°E

Mok Tse Che (Chinese: 莫遮輋) is a village in the Hebe Haven area of Sai Kung District, Hong Kong.

== Administration ==
Mok Tse Che is a recognized village under the New Territories Small House Policy.

== History ==
Mok Tse Che was part of the inter-village grouping, the Ho Chung Tung (蠔涌洞) or Ho Chung Seven Villages (蠔涌七鄉), which had its centre in Ho Chung.

At the time of the 1911 census, the population of Mok Tse Che was 51. The number of males was 20.

In 1955, Austin Coates reported that Mok Tse Che had a population of 64. He described the village as a subsidiary of Wo Mei, an adjacent village located north of Mok Tse Che.
