= Nam Wai =

Coordinates: 22.353239°N 114.259386°E

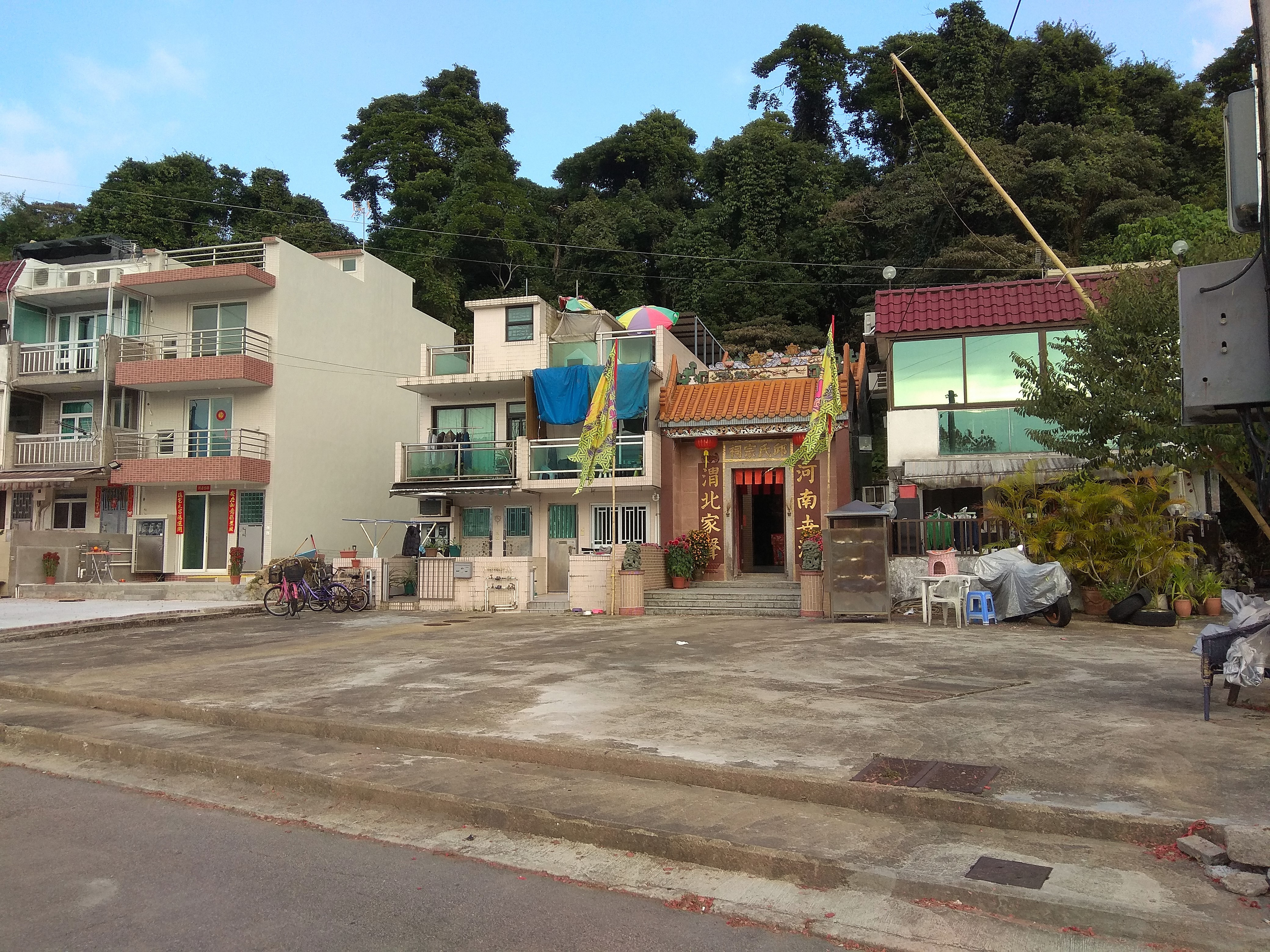
Yau ancestral hall in Nam Wai.

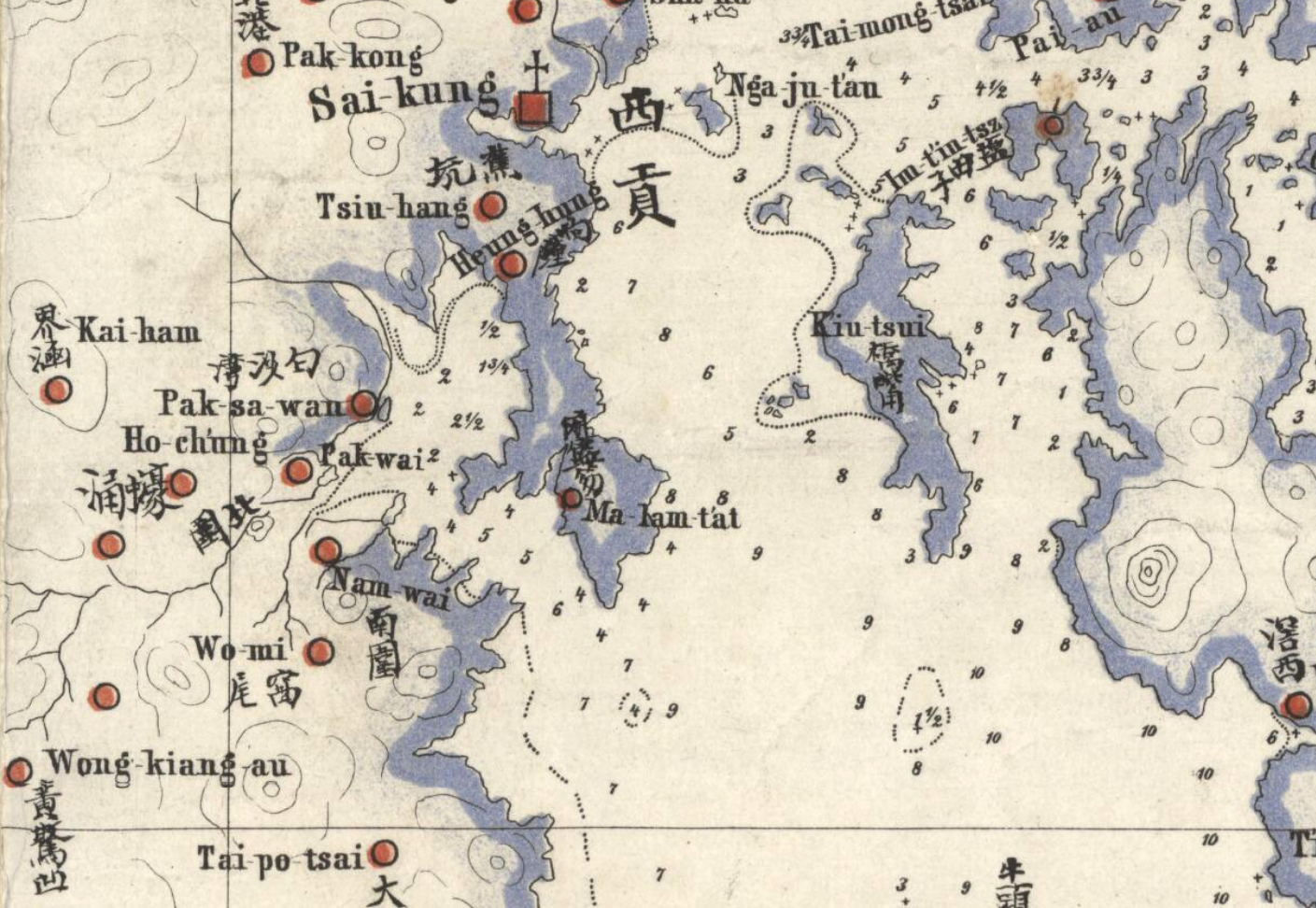
Nam Wai on the "Map of the San-On District" by Simeone Volonteri (1866).

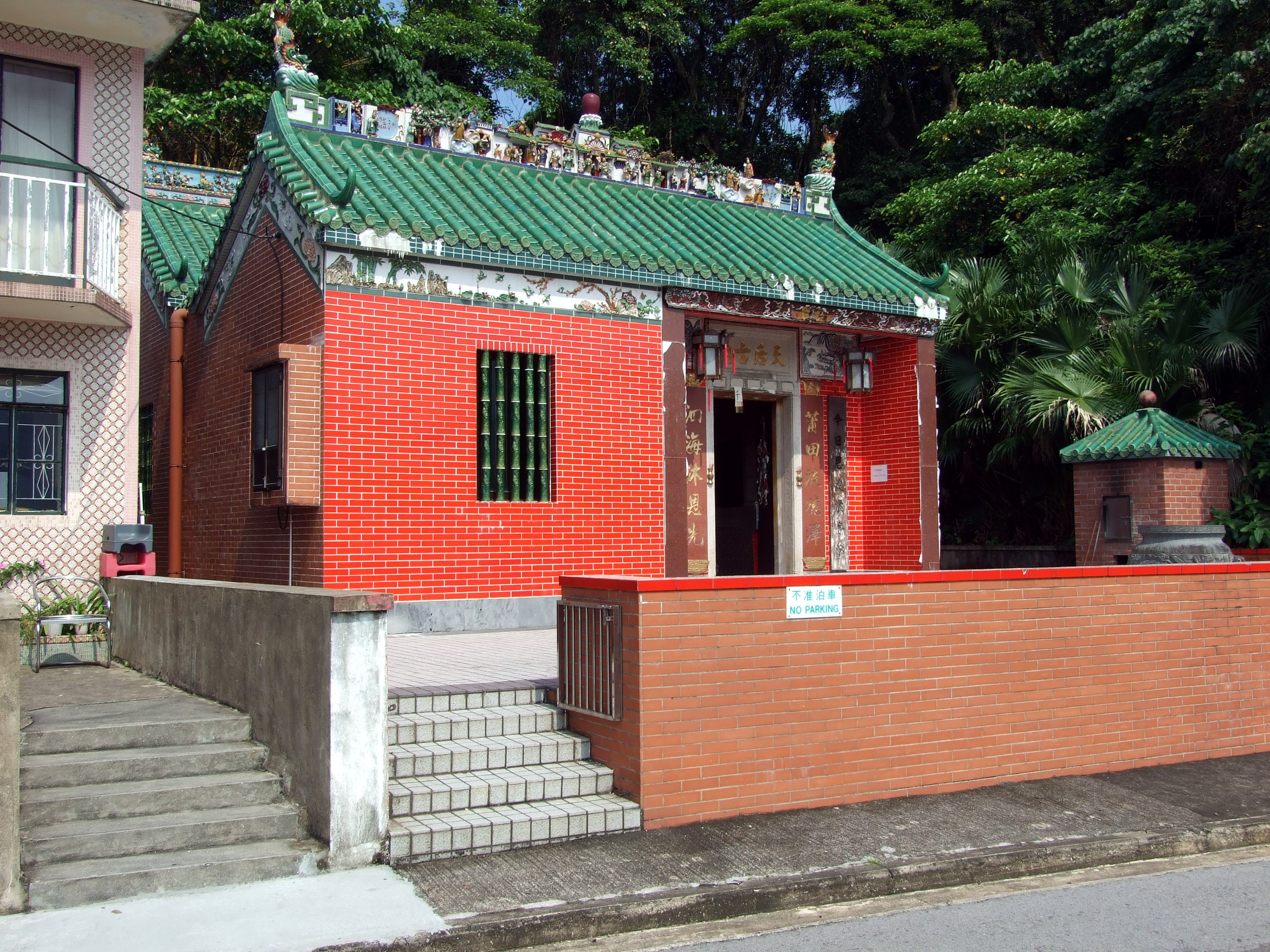
Tin Hau Temple in Nam Wai.

Nam Wai (Chinese: 南圍) is a village in the Hebe Haven area of Sai Kung District, Hong Kong.

== Administration ==
Nam Wai is a recognized village under the New Territories Small House Policy.

== History ==
Nam Wai is a village of the Shing (成) and Yau (邱) clans, established during the 18th century. It appears on the "Map of the San-On District", published in 1866 by Simeone Volonteri.

In September 2023, the head of the village, Sing Yuk-man (son of Sing Fui-on), was arrested for having 1kg of marijuana in his village house.

== Features ==
A Tin Hau Temple is located in Nam Wai.

== See also ==
- Hiram's Highway
- Nearby villages: Heung Chung, Ho Chung, Pak Sha Wan Village, Pak Wai, Wo Mei
