= Che Keng Tuk =

Village in Hong Kong

Coordinates: 22.37104°N 114.26587°E

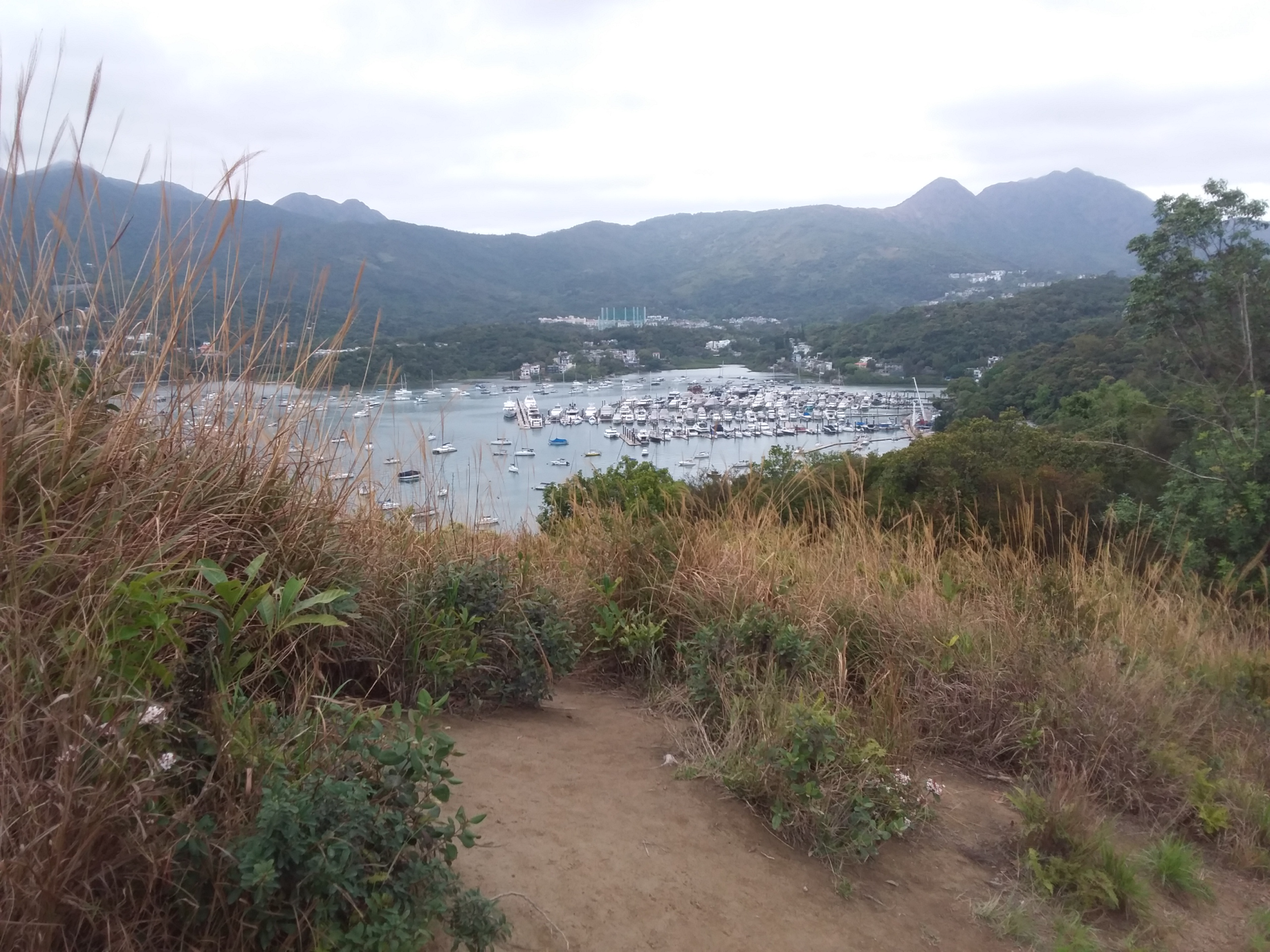
Che Keng Tuk and the Royal Hong Kong Yacht Club Shelter Cove viewed from a hill on Pak Sha Wan Peninsula.

Che Keng Tuk (Chinese: 輋徑篤), also transliterated as Tse Kang Tuk and Che Kang Tuk, is a village in the Hebe Haven area of Sai Kung District, Hong Kong. It is partly located on the northeastern coast of Pak Sha Wan Peninsula.

== Administration ==
Che Keng Tuk is a recognized village under the New Territories Small House Policy.

== See also ==
- Lions Nature Education Centre and Tsiu Hang Village, located near Che Keng Tuk, to its north
