= Wo Mei =

Hakka village in Hong Kong

Coordinates: 22.350521°N 114.251952°E

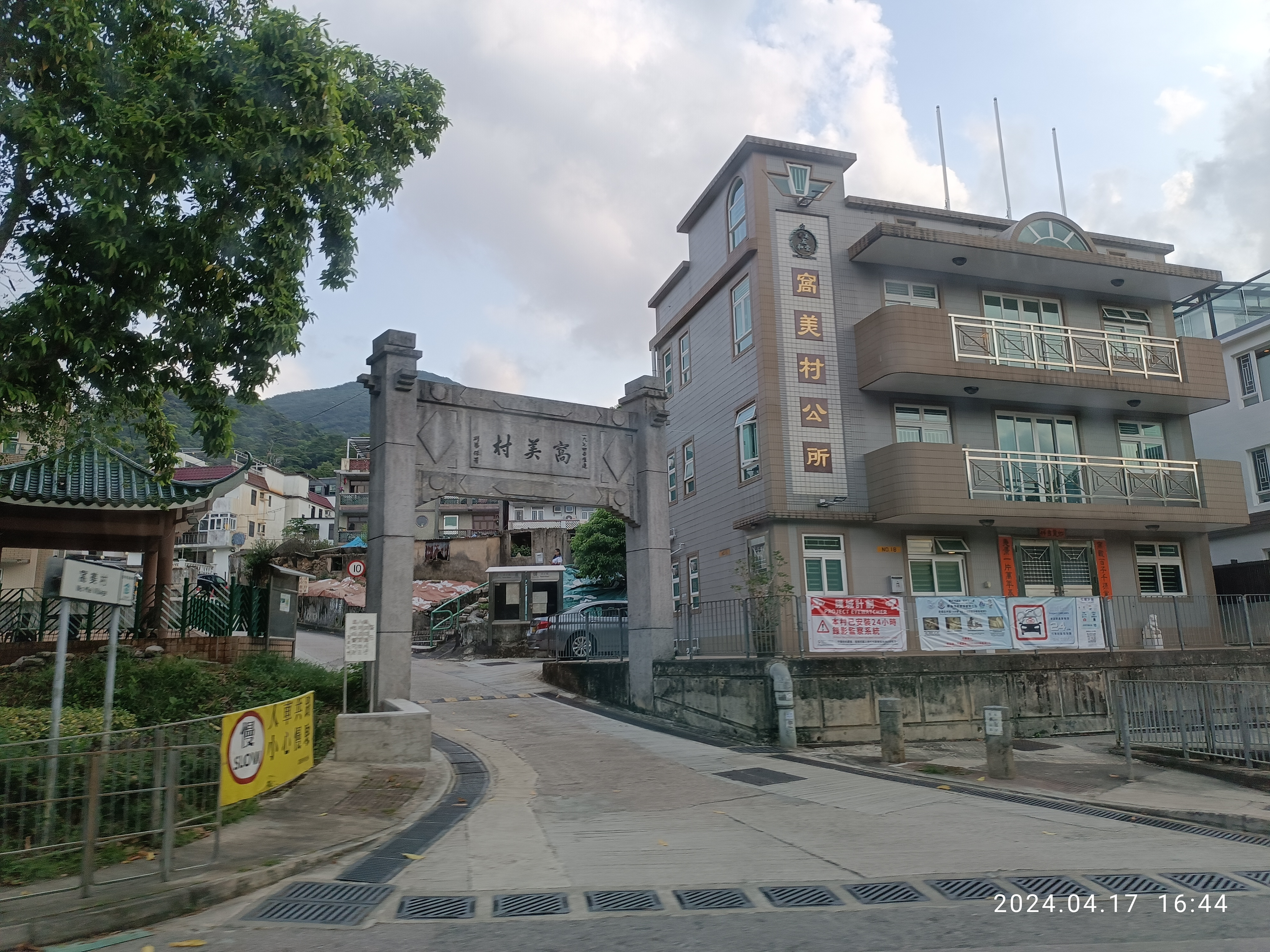
Paifang and village office of Wo Mei viewed from Hiram's Highway.

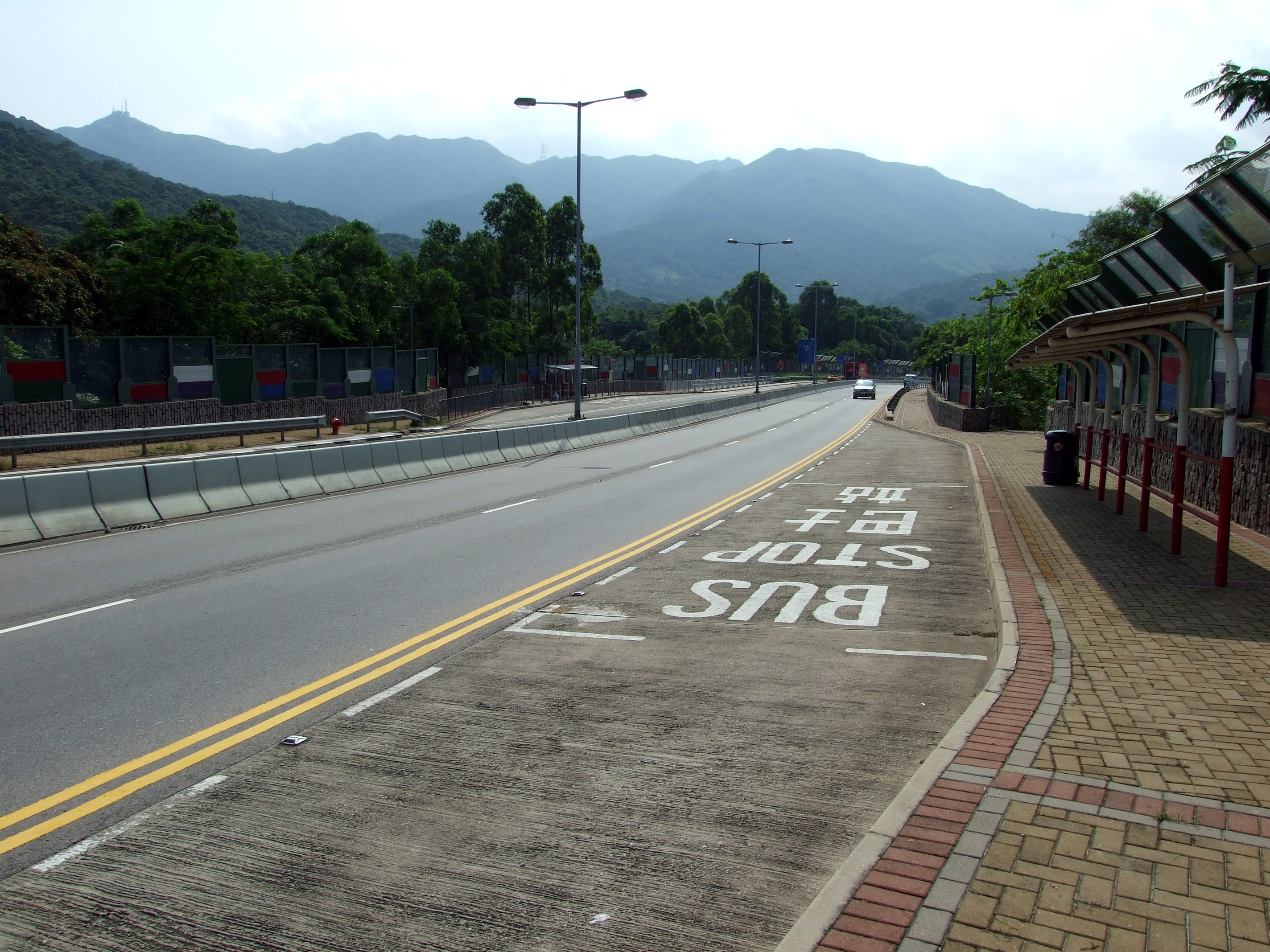
Wo Mei bus stop along New Hiram's Highway.

Wo Mei (Chinese: 窩美) is a Hakka village in the Hebe Haven area of Sai Kung District, Hong Kong.

== Administration ==
Wo Mei is a recognized village under the New Territories Small House Policy.

== History ==
At the time of the 1911 census, the population of Wo Mei was 66. The number of males was 30.

The Chapel of The Immaculate Conception (聖母無原罪小堂) was established in 1930 and was consecrated on 20 January 1957 by Bishop Lorenzo Bianchi. The roof of the chapel was damaged by Typhoon Wanda in 1962.

Though not formally recorded as a 'wai' on maps, Wo Mei is locally divided into Wo Mei Sheung Wai (窩美上圍) and Wo Mei Ha Wai (窩美下圍). Sheung Wai is inhabited by members of the Tse (謝) family, while Ha Wai is a multi-surname community.

== See also ==
- Hiram's Highway
- Nearby villages located north of Wo Mei: Heung Chung, Ho Chung, Nam Wai, Pak Sha Wan Village, Pak Wai
- Mok Tse Che, an adjacent village located south of Wo Mei
