= Ma Nam Wat =

Village in Hong Kong

Coordinates: 22.356824°N 114.2717°E

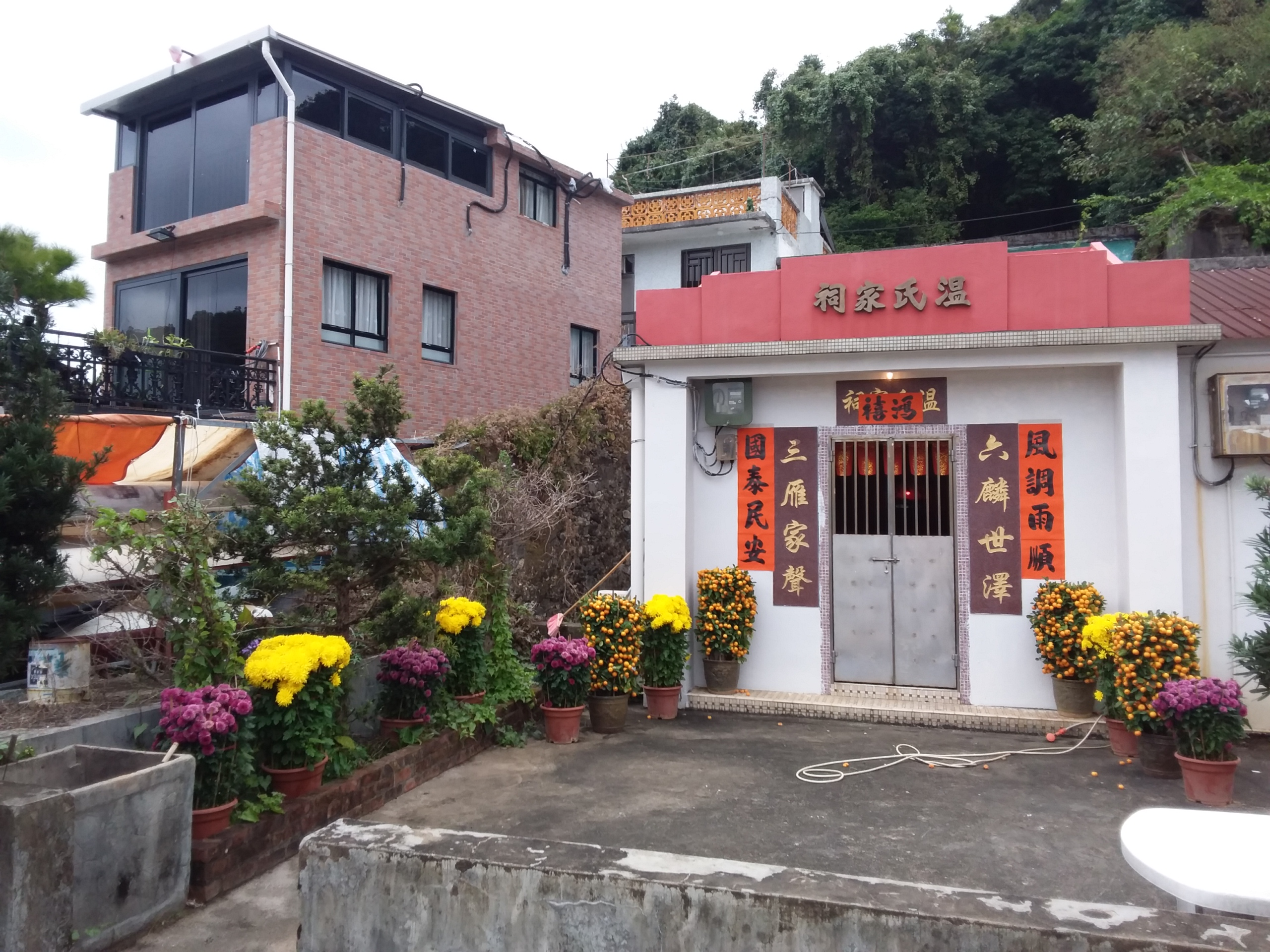
Wan Ancestral Hall (溫氏家祠) in Ma Nam Wat.

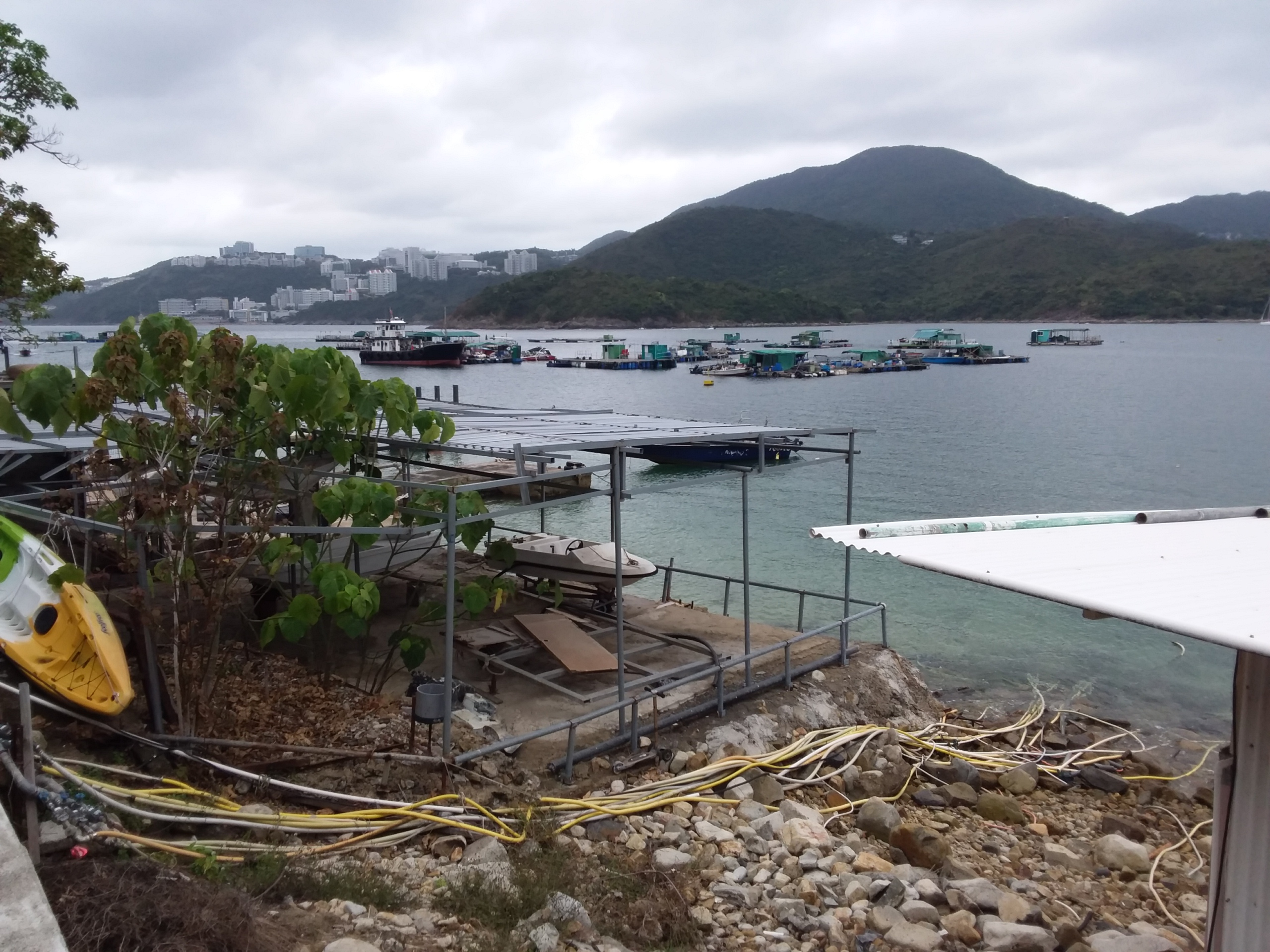
fish culture at Ma Nam Wat.

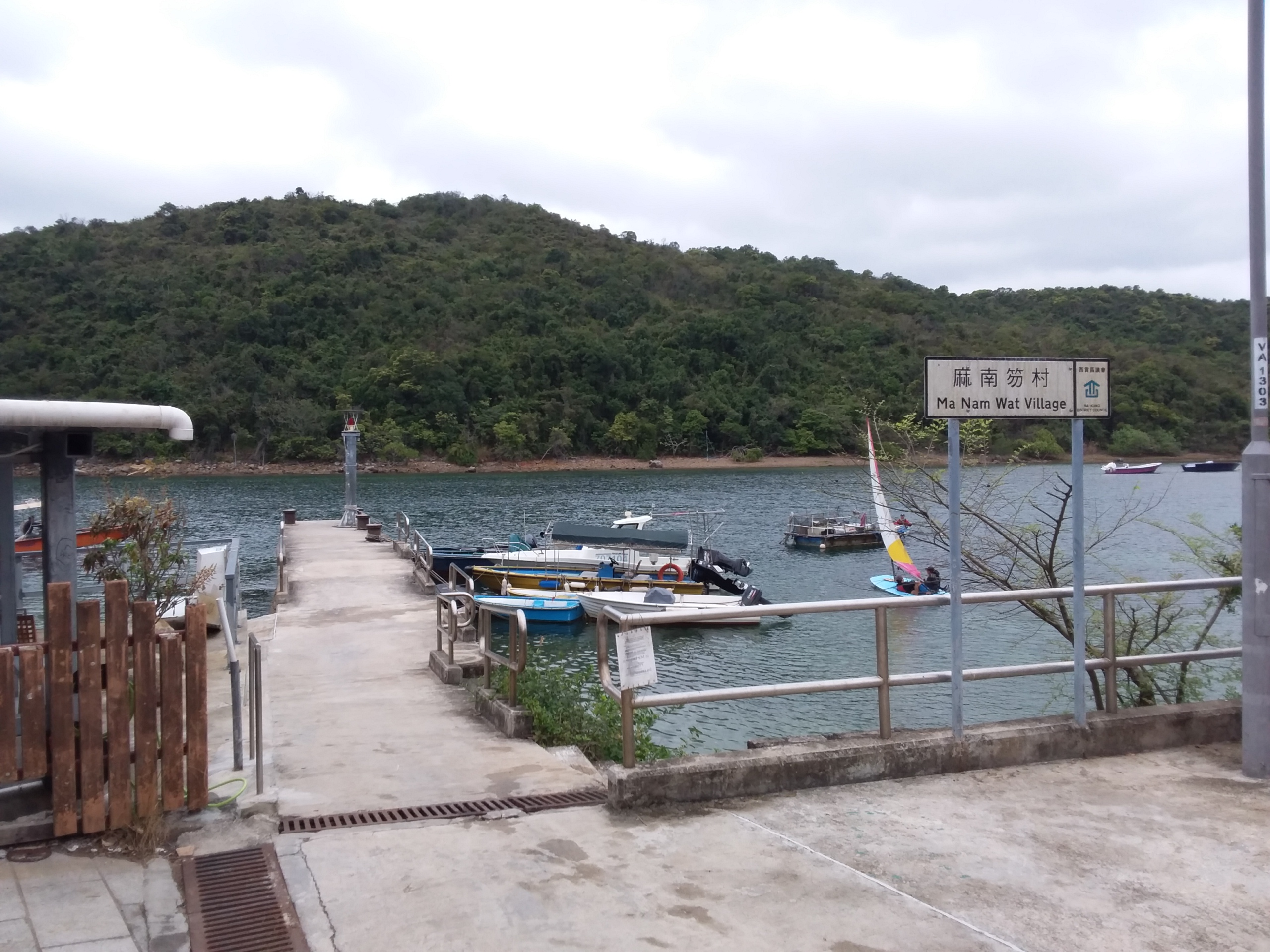
Public pier at Ma Nam Wat.

Ma Nam Wat (Chinese: 麻籃笏) is a village in the Hebe Haven area of Sai Kung District, Hong Kong. It is located on the Pak Sha Wan Peninsula (白沙灣半島) a.k.a. Ma Nam Wat Peninsula (麻籃笏半島).

== Administration ==
Ma Nam Wat is a recognized village under the New Territories Small House Policy.

== Features ==
A section of the waters offshore of Ma Nam Wat is one of the 26 designated marine fish culture zones in Hong Kong.
