= Pak Sha Wan Village =

Coordinates: 22.362937°N 114.258004°E

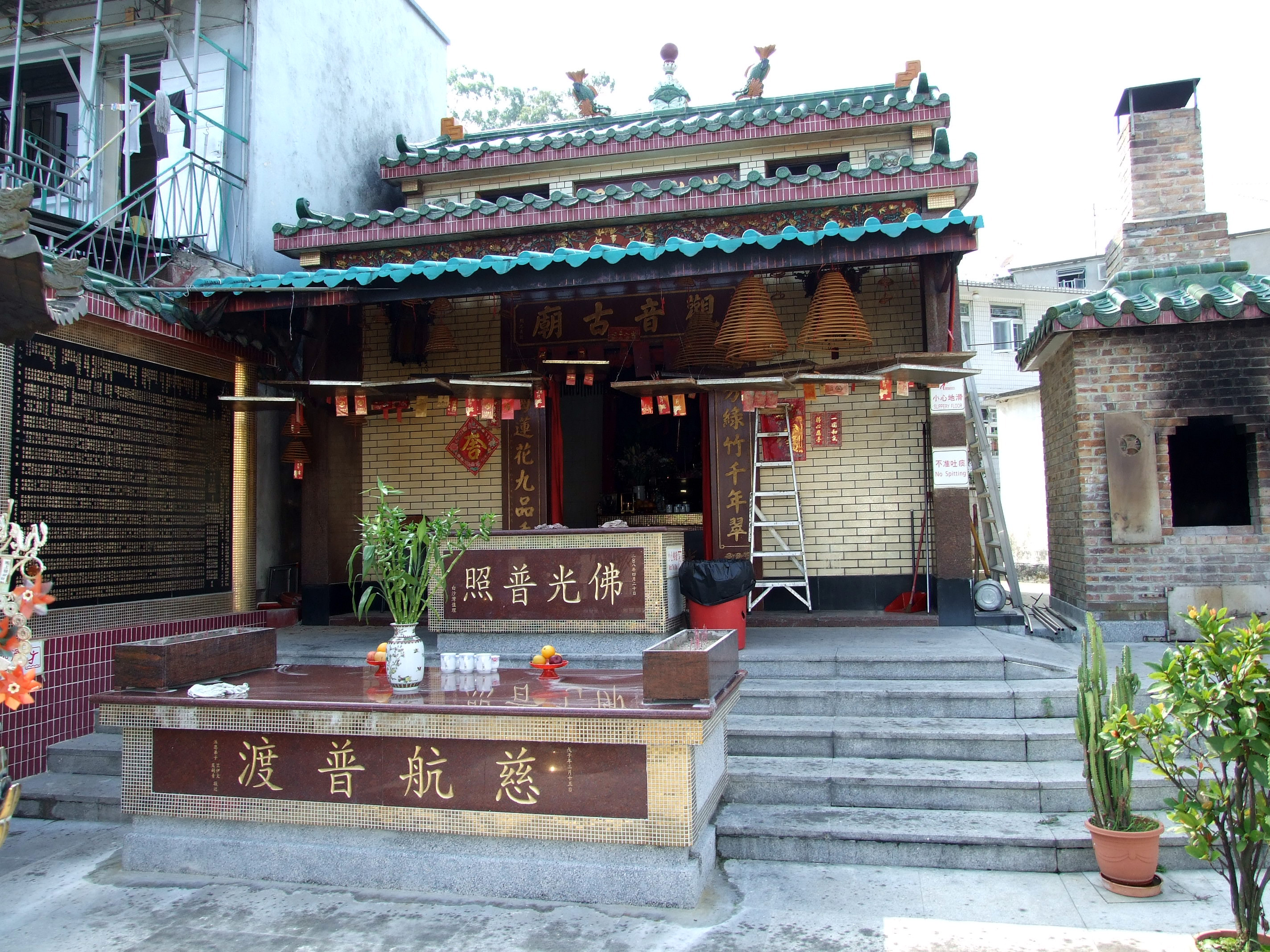
Kwun Yam Temple in Pak Sha Wan Village.

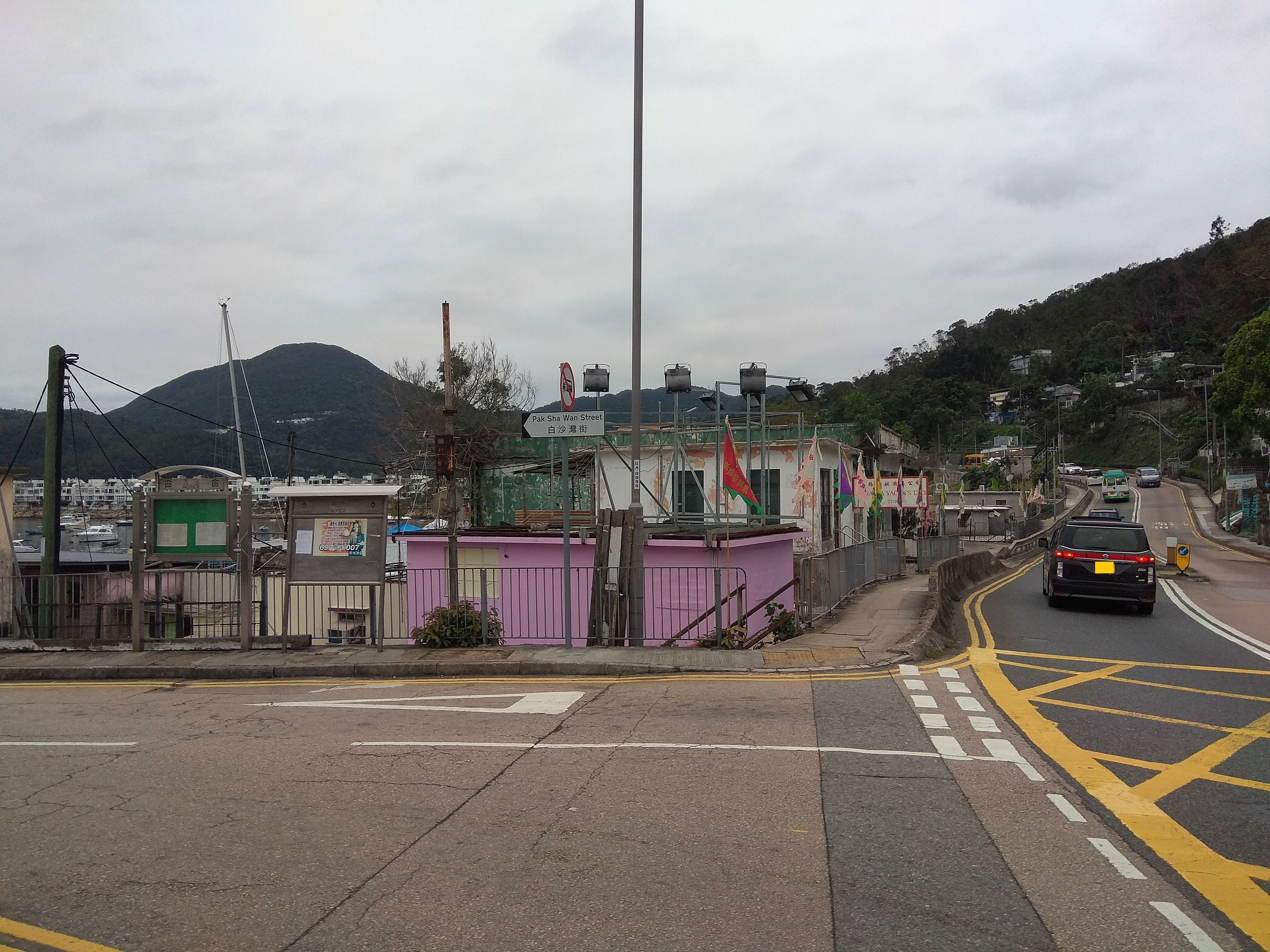
View of Pak Sha Wan Village along Hiram's Highway.

Pak Sha Wan (Chinese: 白沙灣; lit. 'White Sand Bay') is a village in the Hebe Haven (白沙灣, Pak Sha Wan) area of Sai Kung District, Hong Kong.

== History ==
Writing in the period of 1955 to 1958, Austin Coates and James W. Hayes referred to the village as 'Pak Sha Wan Old Village', distinguishing it from the nearby newly established Kau Sai San Tsuen, which they referred to as 'Pak Sha Wan New Village' (白沙新灣).

== See also ==
- Hiram's Highway
- Nearby villages: Heung Chung, Ho Chung, Nam Wai, Pak Wai, Wo Mei
