= Tsiu Hang Special Area =

Conservation area in Hong Kong

Coordinates: 22.374°N 114.265°E

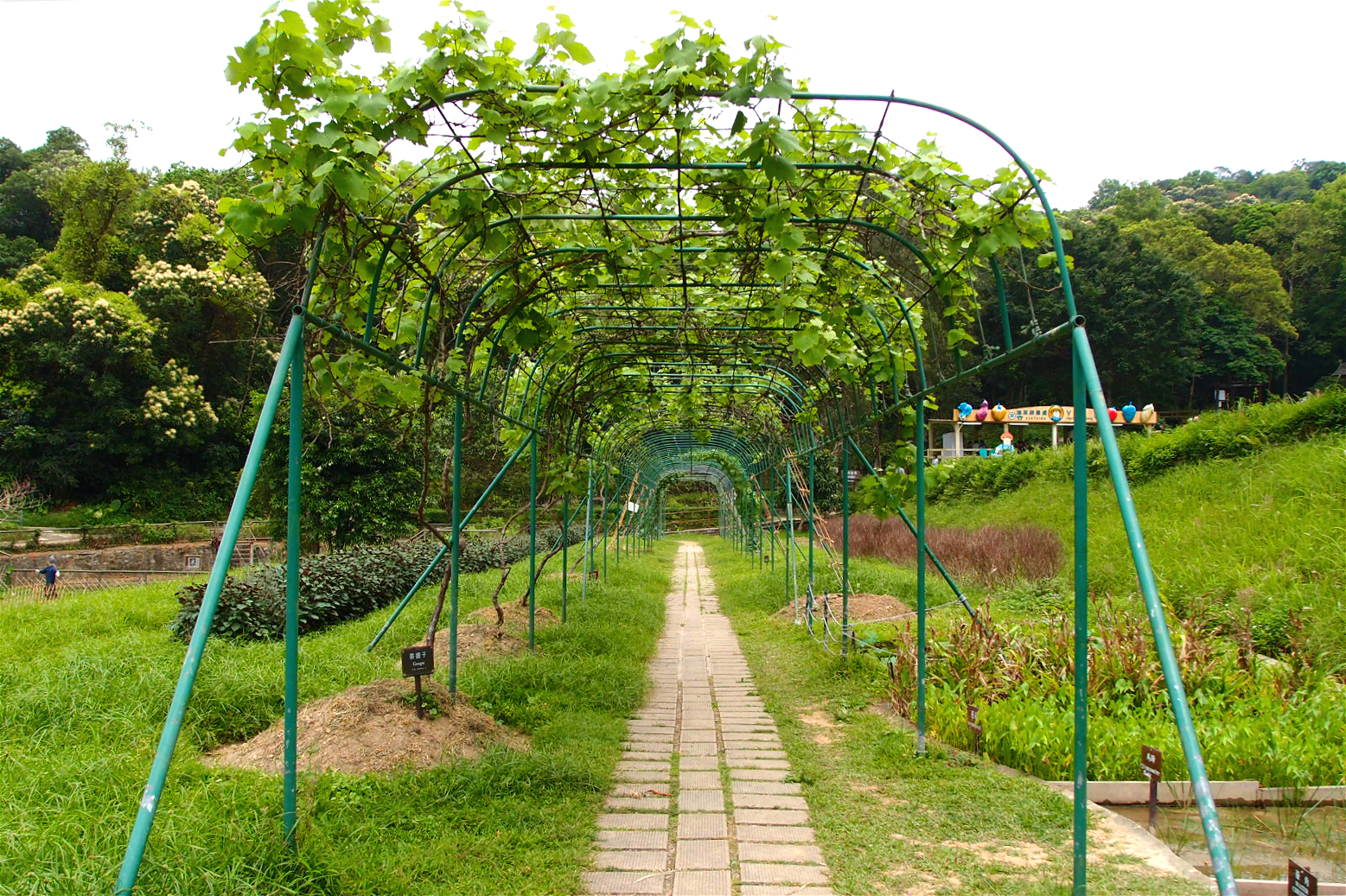
Pergola within the Lions Nature Education Centre.

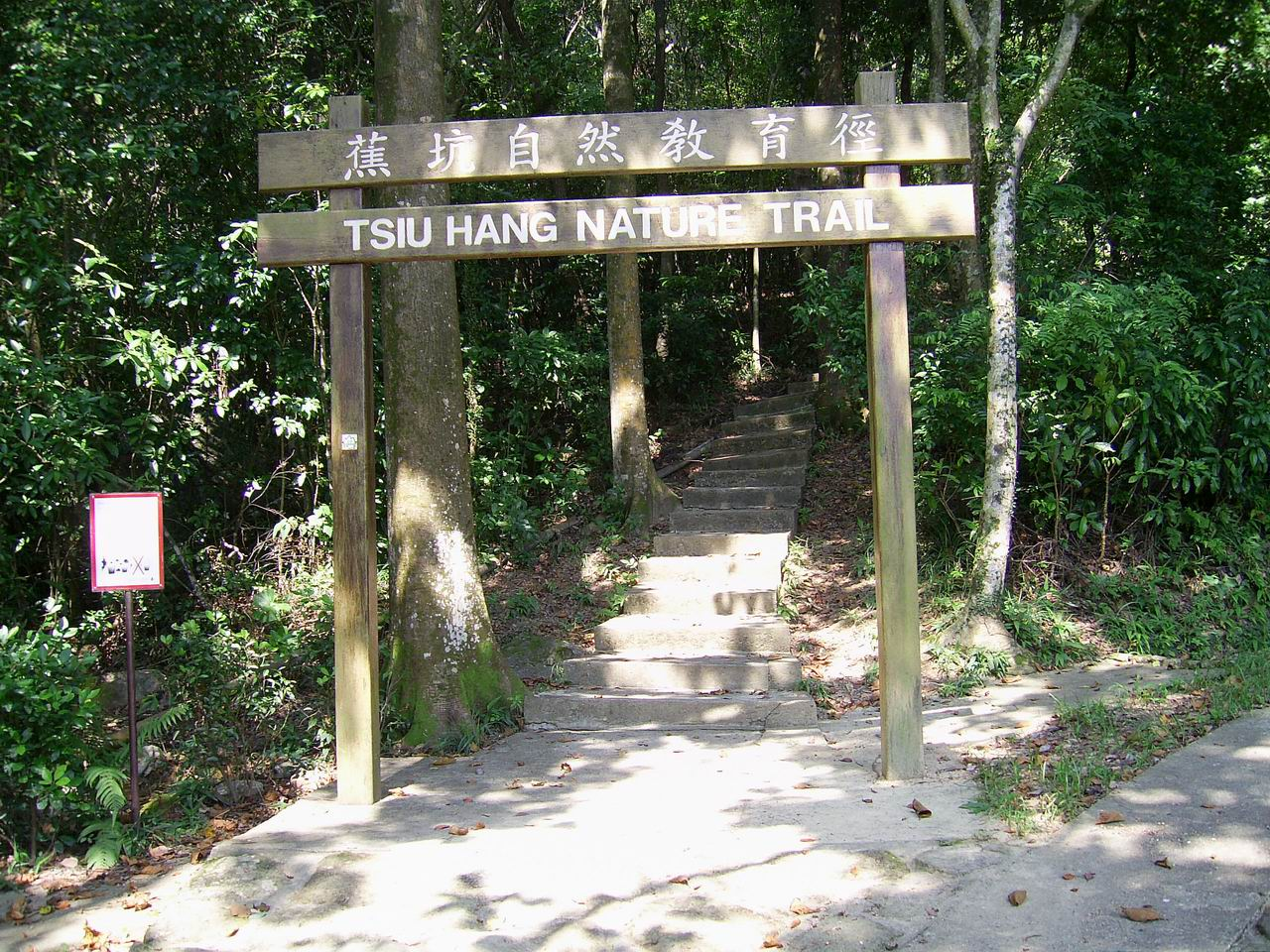
Tsiu Hang Nature Trail.

Tsiu Hang Special Area (Chinese: 蕉坑特別地區) is a nature reserve in the Sai Kung District of Hong Kong. Covering 24 hectares, it was designated as a Special Area in 1987.

The special area is located at the north of the Pak Sha Wan Peninsula, in the Tsiu Hang area of Sai Kung District.

The Lions Nature Education Centre is located within the special area.

The Tsiu Hang Nature Trail (蕉坑自然教育徑) is located within the special area.
