= Heung Chung =

Coordinates: 22.352592°N 114.25263°E

Heung Chung (Chinese: 响鐘) is a village in the Hebe Haven area of Sai Kung District, Hong Kong.

== Administration ==
Heung Chung is a recognized village under the New Territories Small House Policy.

== History ==
At the time of the 1911 census, the population of Shek Kwu Lung was 4. The number of males was 1.

== See also ==
- Hiram's Highway
- Nearby villages: Ho Chung, Nam Wai, Pak Sha Wan Village, Pak Wai, Wo Mei
