= Trio Beach =

Beach in Pak Sha Wan Peninsula, New Territories, Hong Kong

- Beach
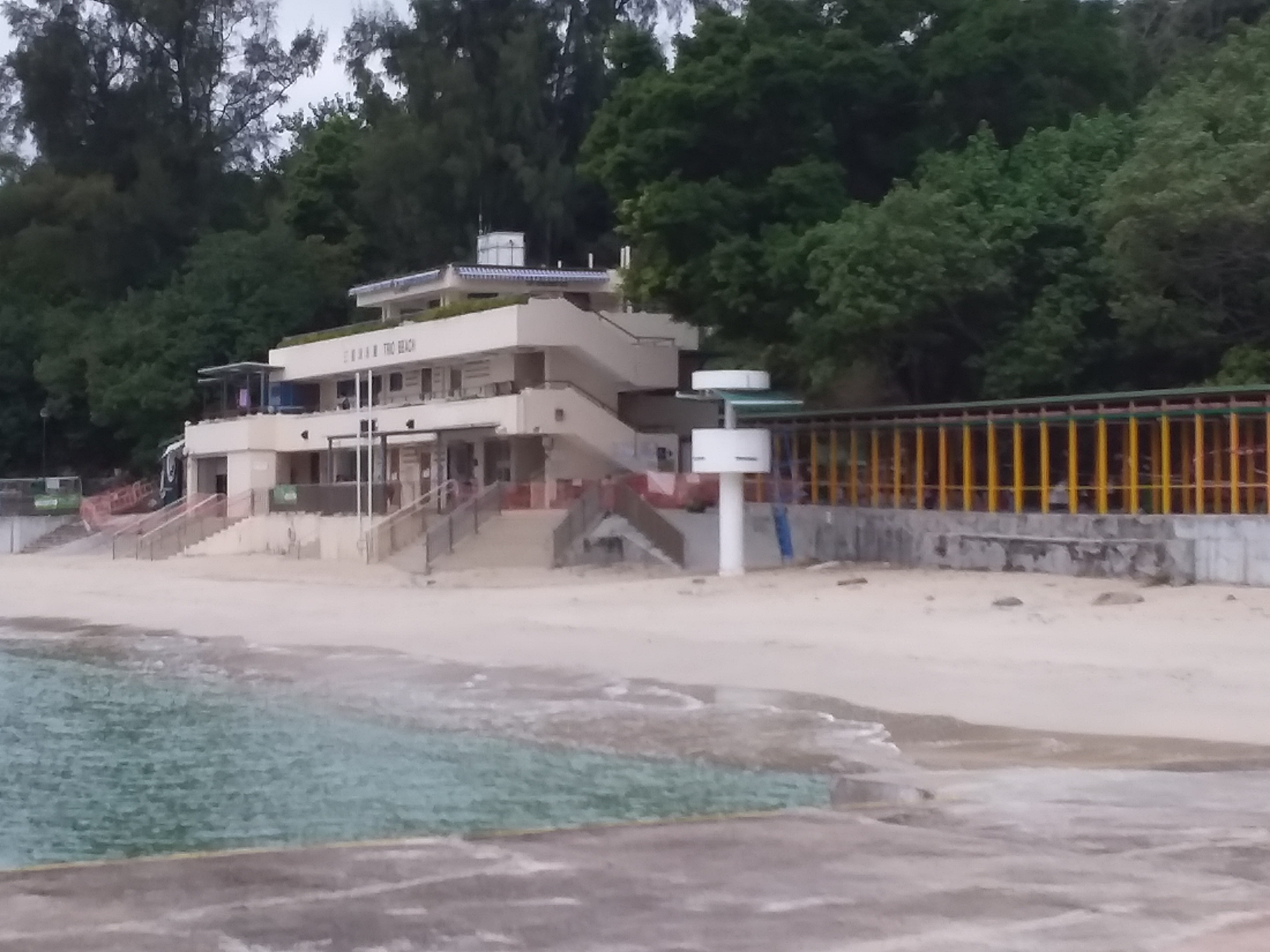
- Trio Beach

- Coordinates: 22.35767°N 114.26781°E
- Location: Pak Sha Wan Peninsula, New Territories

Dimensions
  - Length: 131 metres
- Patrolled by: Leisure and Cultural Services Department

Trio Beach
- Traditional Chinese: 三星灣泳灘
- Simplified Chinese: 三星湾泳滩
Transcriptions
Standard Mandarin
- Hanyu Pinyin: Sān Xīng Wān Yǒng Tān
Yue: Cantonese
- Jyutping: saam1 sing1 waan1 wing6 taan1

Trio Beach is a gazetted beach facing the bay of Sam Sing Wan (三星灣) and located on Pak Sha Wan Peninsula, Sai Kung District, Hong Kong. The beach has barbecue pits and is managed by the Leisure and Cultural Services Department of the Hong Kong Government. The beach is 131 metres long and is rated as good to fair by the Environmental Protection Department for its water quality in the past twenty years.

== History ==
On 18 July 2010, a dragon boat was swamped by the wakes from two passing speedboats and all 21 paddlers who were practising for the coming dragon boat competition at the beach fell into the sea. A 26-year-old woman was treated at Tseung Kwan O Hospital for her leg injury and was discharged.

In September 2018, the beach had to be temporarily closed due to the sewage being leaked into the sea near the beach from the Sai Kung Sewage Treatment Works. This was due to the Typhoon Mangkhut.

On 1 July 2020, a 68-year-old woman had drowned while swimming near the beach. She was unconscious when she was rescued by a lifeguard and was taken by an ambulance to Tseung Kwan O Hospital for treatment.

== Usage ==
The beach is split in two by a rocky outcrop and a whopping lifeguard tower. The beach is also accessible by hiking for a healthier and more scenic option as well as kai-to from Hebe Haven Pier.

== Features ==
The beach has the following features:

- BBQ pits (20 nos.)
- Changing rooms
- Showers
- Toilets
- Refreshment kiosk
- Water sports centre
- Playground

== See also ==
- Beaches of Hong Kong
