= Tsiu Hang, Sai Kung District =

Village in Hong Kong

Coordinates: 22°22′22″N 114°16′06″E

Tsiu Hang (蕉坑; Cantonese Yale: jīu hāang) is a village in the Hebe Haven area of Sai Kung District in the New Territories, Hong Kong.

== Recognised status ==
Tsiu Hang is a recognised village under the New Territories Small House Policy.

== See also ==
- Che Keng Tuk
- Lions Nature Education Centre
- Pak Sha Wan Peninsula
- Planispectrum hongkongense
- Tsiu Hang Special Area
