= Kau Sai San Tsuen =

Village in Hong Kong

Coordinates: 22.364365°N 114.258739°E

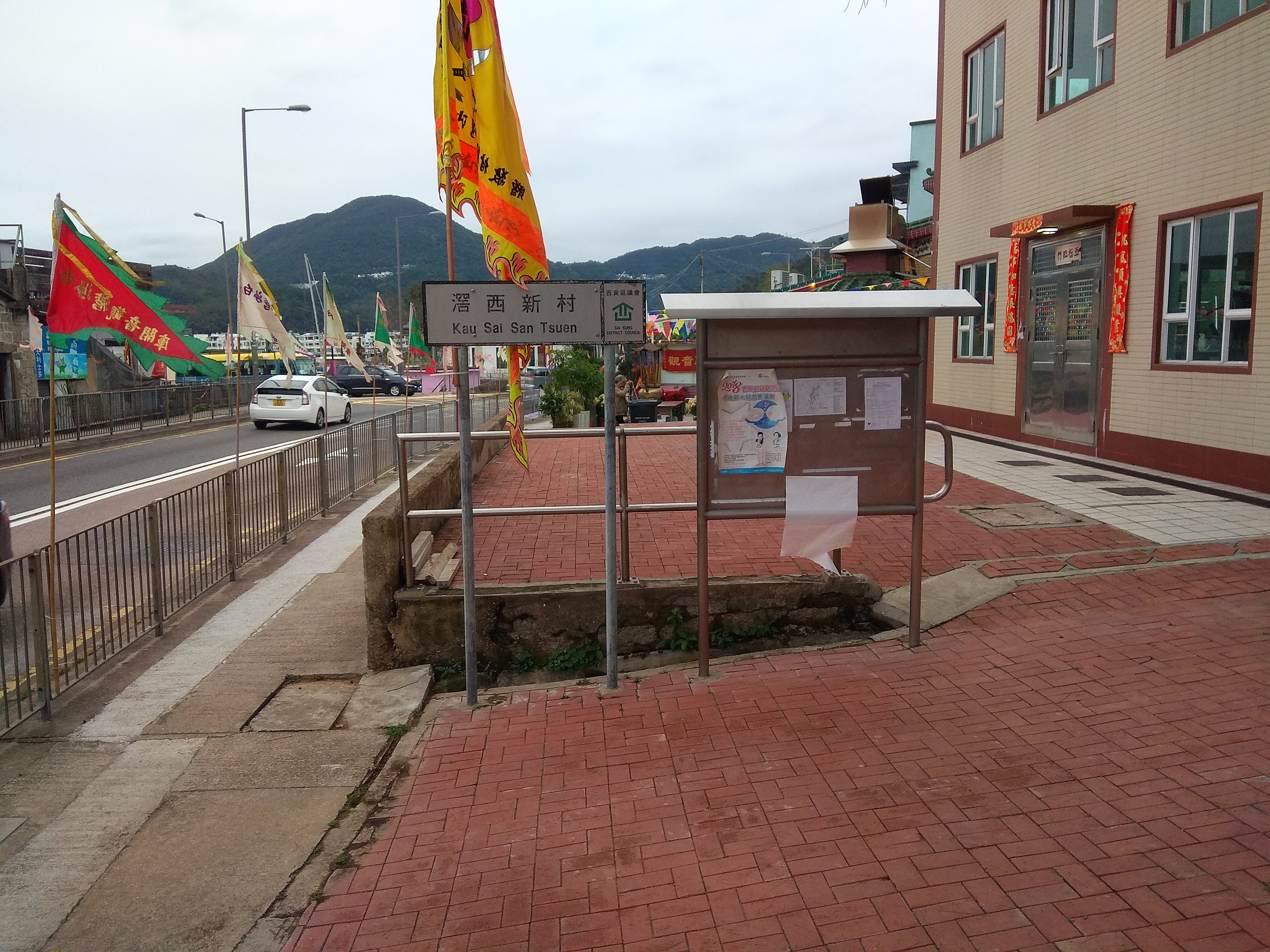
Kau Sai San Tsuen Village Office along Hiram's Highway.

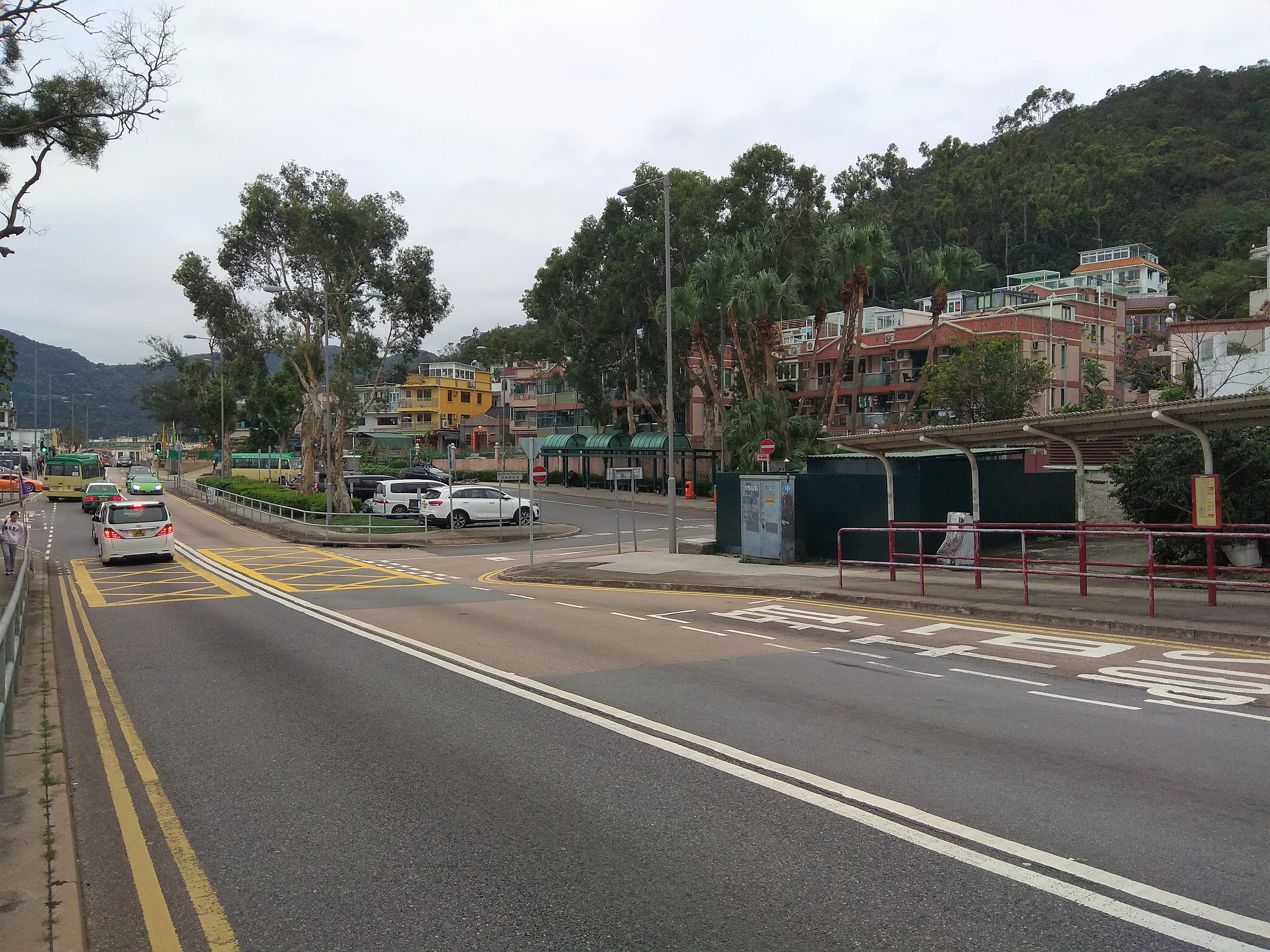
Kau Sai San Tsuen along Hiram's Highway.

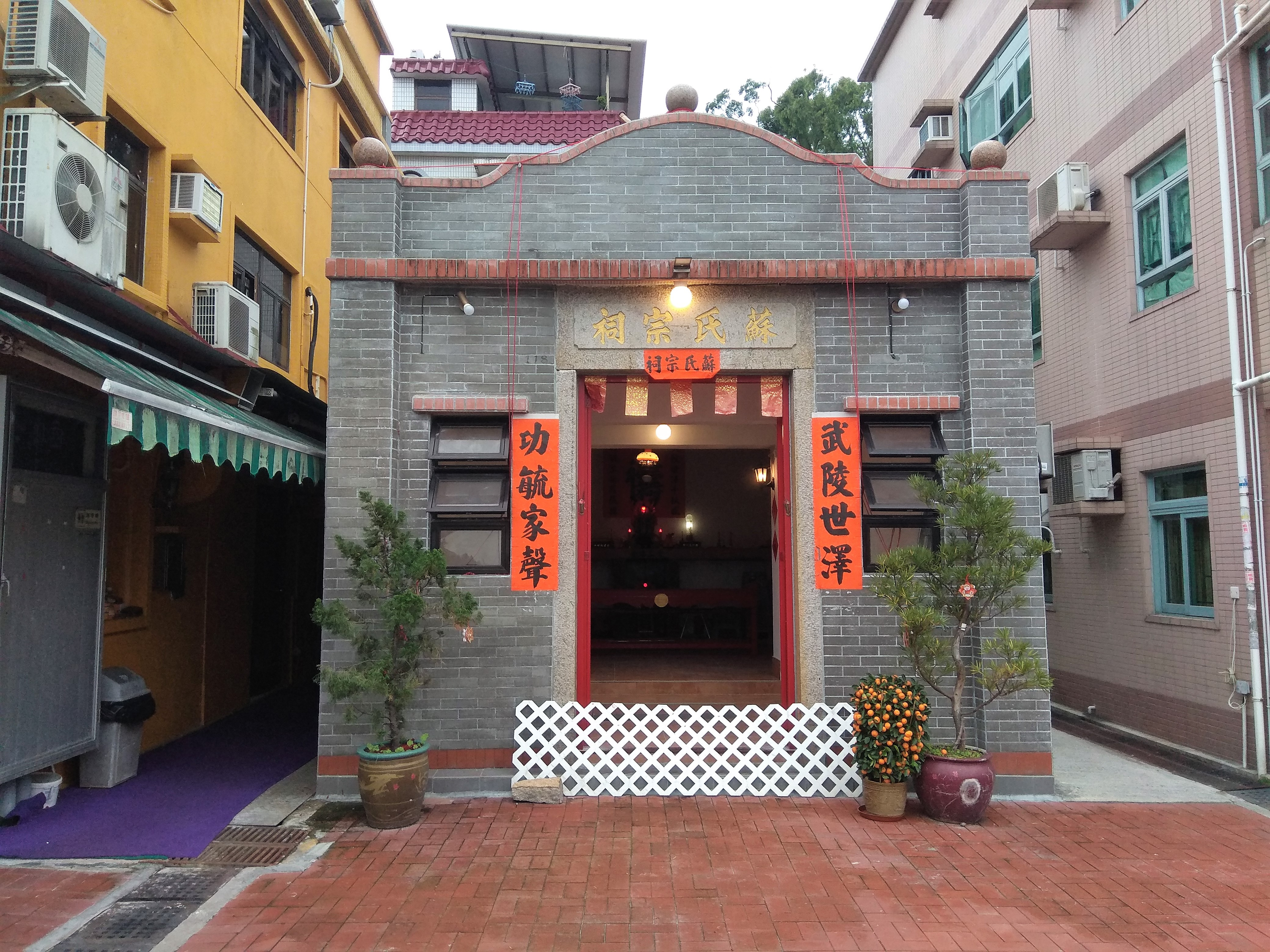
So (蘇) Ancestral Hall in Kau Sai San Tsuen.

Kau Sai San Tsuen (Chinese: 滘西新村) is a village in the Hebe Haven area of Sai Kung District, Hong Kong.

== Administration ==
Kau Sai San Tsuen is a recognized village under the New Territories Small House Policy.

== History ==
In 1952, Hakka farmers and shopkeepers of Kau Sai Chau were required to relocate, because the place was located in the centre of a large area of sea about to be designated as a military firing range. The villagers were resited to Kau Sai San Tsuen. At the time of the relocation, the village was described as "a new village of 17 houses, family temple, school hall, pigsties, grass-stores and latrine".

Writing in the period of 1955 to 1958, Austin Coates and James W. Hayes referred to the village as 'Pak Sha Wan New Village' (白沙新灣), distinguishing it from the nearby Pak Sha Wan Village, which they referred to as 'Pak Sha Wan Old Village'.

Around the 1950s, anthropologist Barbera Ward started living in Kau Sai Chau intermittently for 30 years while becoming fishermen's advocate and liaison. She liaised with Hong Kong government, then as a British colony, to abolish Basalt Island Firing Range. She then managed to let the government lease out abandoned houses for fishermen, so they have land-based dwellings. After she died in 1981 a bilingual memorial epitaph was erected in her honour.
