= Hebe Haven =

Coordinates: 22°22′N 114°16′E

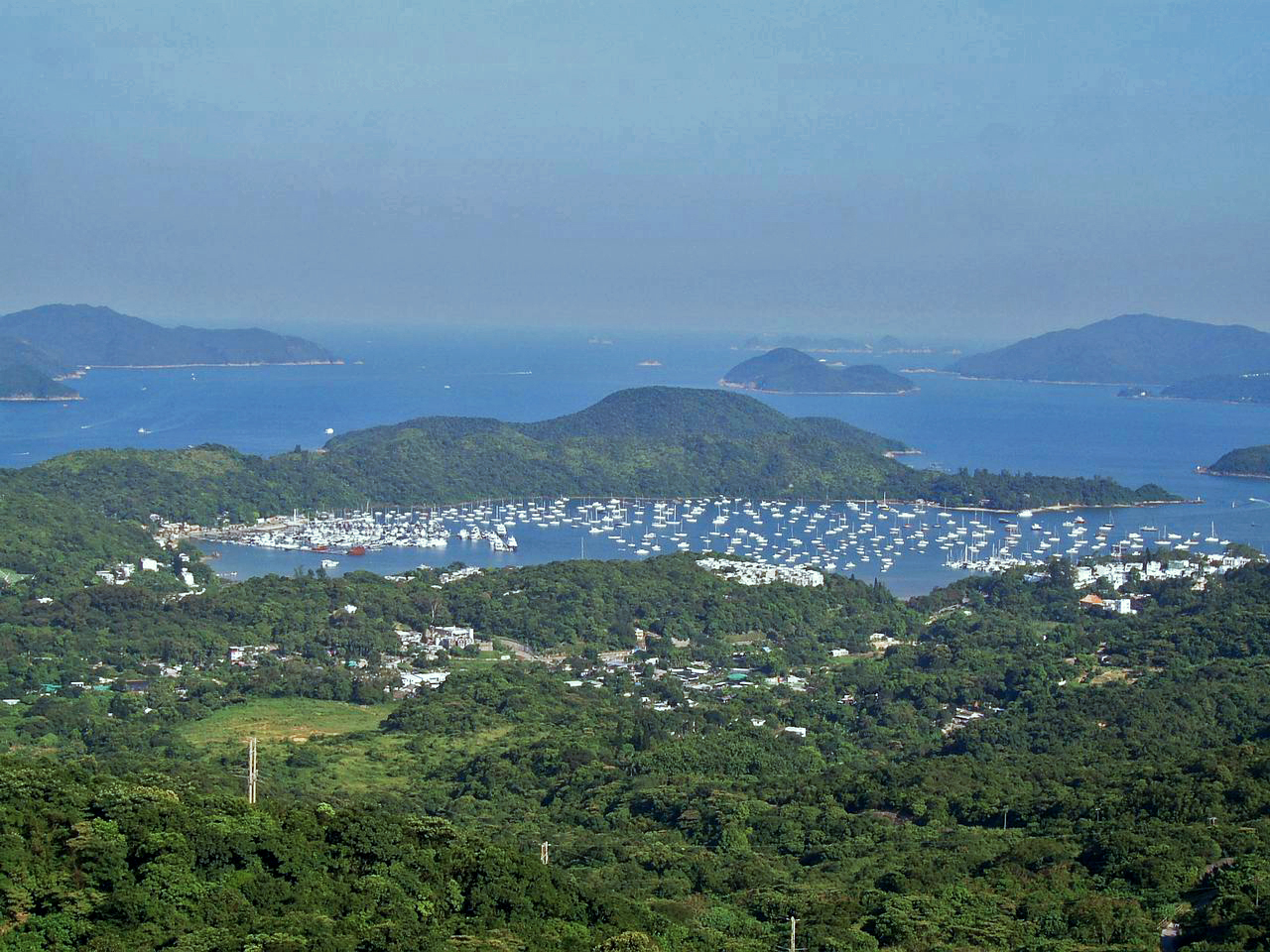
View of Hebe Haven and Pak Sha Wan Peninsula (centre).

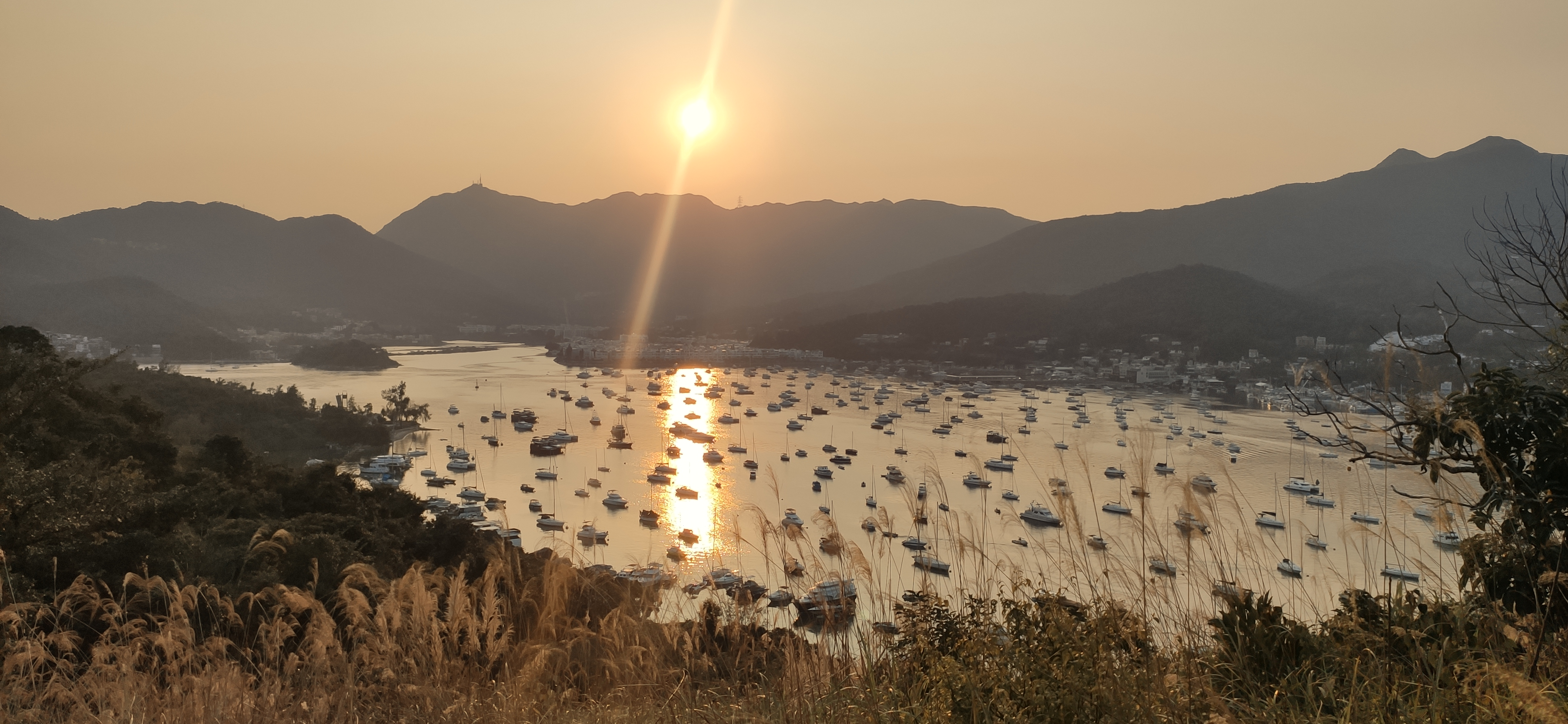
Hebe Haven and Buffalo Hill when viewed from a hill on Pak Sha Wan Peninsula.

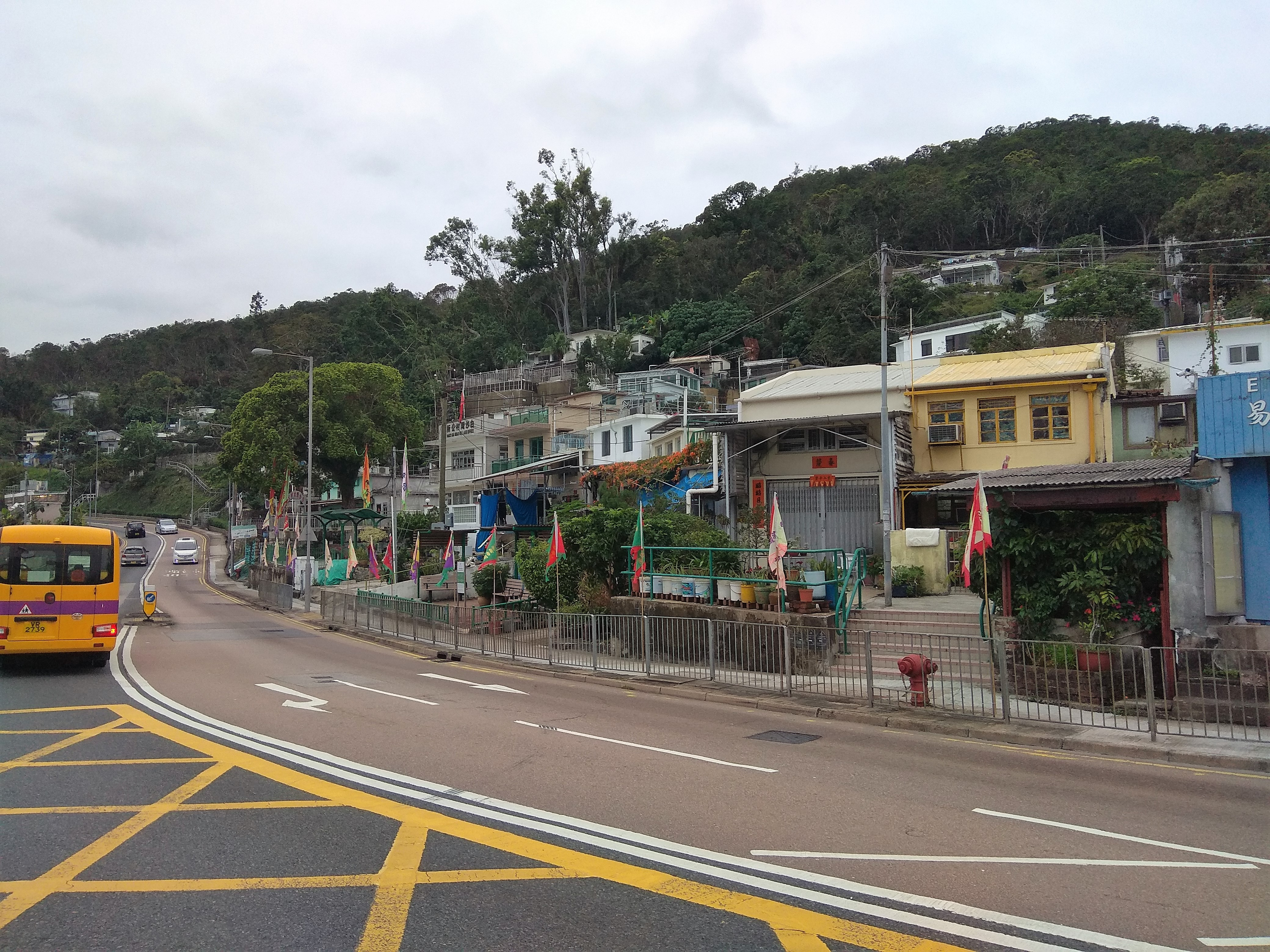
Hiram's Highway at Kau Sai San Tsuen.

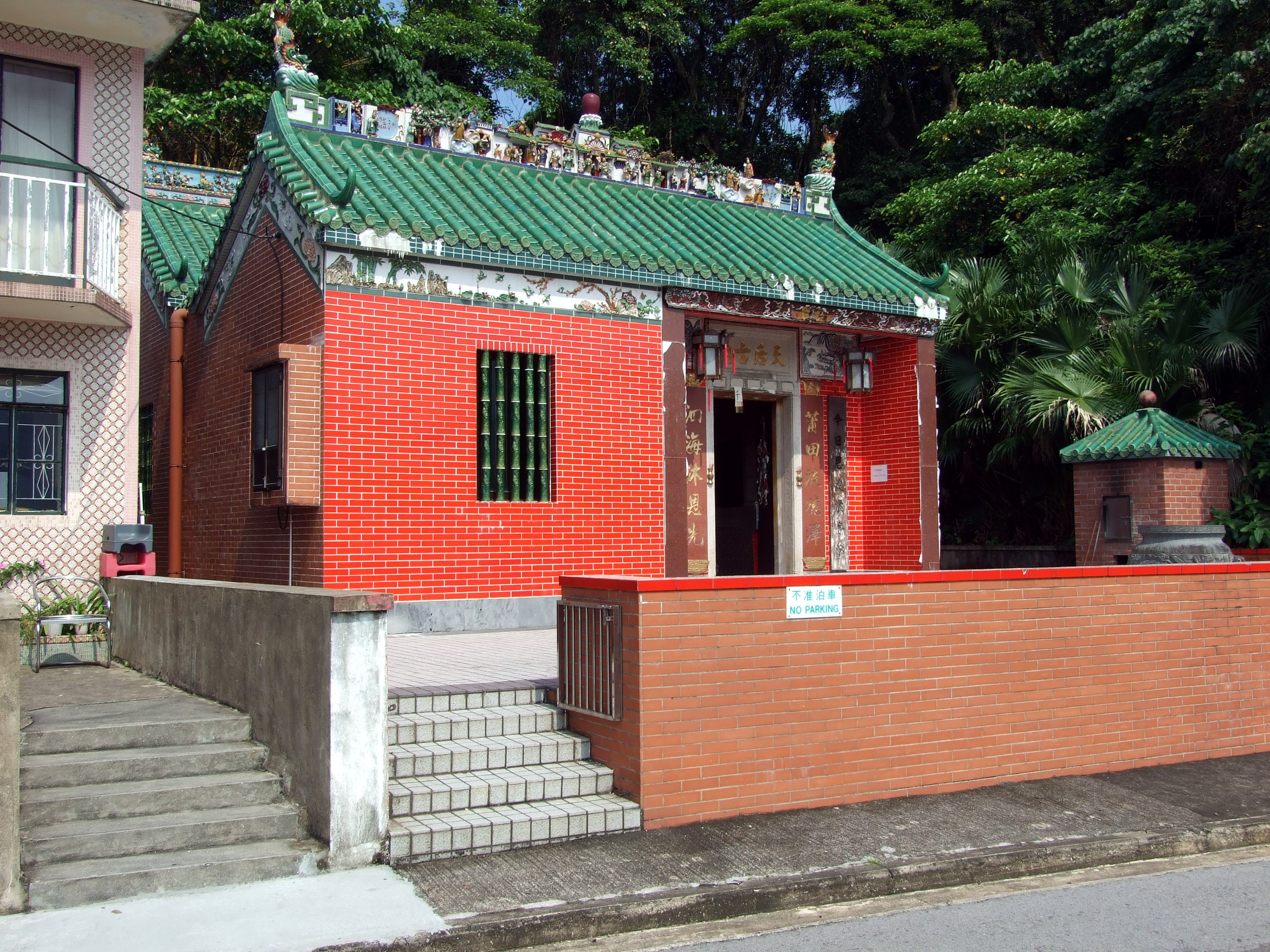
Tin Hau Temple in Nam Wai.

Hebe Haven, also known as Pak Sha Wan (Chinese: 白沙灣; lit. 'White Sand Bay'), is a harbour on the south shore of Sai Kung Peninsula in Hong Kong.

The harbour has one opening to Port Shelter in its south. The Pak Sha Wan Peninsula, spanning south from Tsiu Hang (蕉坑) hugs the Hebe Haven and separates it from Inner Port Shelter (Sai Kung Hoi). Villages are established along its shores. The haven is an excellent natural harbour for yachts and boats and is home to a number of yacht clubs.

== Geography ==
Two main rivers run into the haven, Ho Chung River at the west and Tai Chung River in the north west. Tides, sea currents and river drifts form alleviates and beaches in the haven, although the tidal flow is of minimal strength. A number of smaller streams run into the haven, notably one at the extreme north western edge, just north of Pak Sha Wan. The mangrove area surrounding this stream is a good place in Hong Kong to see the black-capped kingfisher, it is not scenic, small in area and it can be accessed at high tide by dinghy only, nevertheless black-capped kingfishers are commonly sighted.

The Pak Sha Wan Peninsula (白沙灣半島) a.k.a. Ma Nam Wat Peninsula (麻籃笏半島) forms the eastern edge of the harbour.

The white sands of a beach northwest gives the native name of Pak Sha Wan, which means "white sand bay". It is also the name of a village and became the indigenous name of Hebe Haven.

== Villages and housing ==
Villages that are close to the Hebe Haven include Au Tsai Tsuen, Che Keng Tuk, Heung Chung, Ho Chung New Village, Kau Sai San Tsuen, Luk Mei Tsuen, Nam Wai, Pak Sha Wan, Pak Wai, Ta Ho Tun Ha Wai, Ta Ho Tun Sheung Wai, Tsiu Hang, Tsiu Hang Hau and Wo Mei.

The Marina Cove residential estate is also located in Hebe Haven.

The 40-room Pier Hotel on the Pak Sha Wan waterfront, owned by the family of Sai Kung’s richest man Francis Choi Chee-ming, opened in September 2018. The hotel's sole restaurant is called WA Theater and serves Japanese cuisine.

== Yacht clubs ==
The haven is home to a number of yacht clubs, including the Shelter Cove yacht club (part of the Royal Hong Kong Yacht Club), and Hebe Haven Yacht Club. There is also a Sea Scouting activity centre situated by the haven. There are numerous moorings and many boats distributed around the area along with a clearly marked navigational channel. The channel marks are not lit at night.

== See also ==
- Lions Nature Education Centre
