= Eustachio Zanoli =

Most Reverend Eustachio Vito Modesto Zanoli, O.F.M. Ref.
- Apostolic Vicar of Hupeh
- Archdiocese: Hankou
- Appointed: 12 September 1862
- Predecessor: Bishop Luigi Celestino Spelta, O.F.M. Ref.
- Successor: Bishop Vincenzo Epiphane Carlassare, O.F.M. Ref.

Orders
- Ordination: 19 February 1854
- Consecration: 15 September 1861 by Bishop Luigi Celestino Spelta, O.F.M. Ref.

Personal details
- Born: 12 May 1831 Nonantola, Italy
- Died: 17 May 1883 (aged 52) China
- Denomination: Roman Catholic

Bishop Eustachio Vito Modesto Zanoli, O.F.M (12 May 1831 – 17 May 1883), was an Italian missionary of the Order of Friar Minor. Roman Catholic Apostolic Vicars of Eastern Hupeh, now Roman Catholic Archdiocese of Hankou. He was founder of the Catholic hospital in Wuhan, now Central Hospital of Wuhan.

== Early life ==
Zanoli was born on 12 May 1831 in Nonantola, Italy.

== Priesthood ==
On 19 February 1854, Zanoli was ordained a priest.

== Episcopate ==
Zanoli was appointed Coadjutor Vicar Apostolic of Hupeh, China and Titular Bishop of Eleutheropolis in Macedonia on 7 August 1857. He was consecrated as a bishop on 15 September 1861 by Bishop Luigi Celestino Spelta, O.F.M. Ref. He succeeded as Vicar Apostolic of Hupeh, China on 12 September 1862. He was appointed Vicar Apostolic of Eastern Hupeh, China on 2 September 1870 and Apostolic Administrator of Northwestern Hupeh, China in 1871. In 1876, he resigned from his services as Apostolic Administrator of Northwestern Hupeh, China.

== Mission in China ==
In 1886 Zanoli invited the Canossians to Wuhan to provide social service in the Catholic Hospital of Hankou which he established in 1880.

== Death ==
Zanoli died in China on 17 May 1883.
