= Simeone Volonteri =

Italian missionary and bishop (1831–1904)

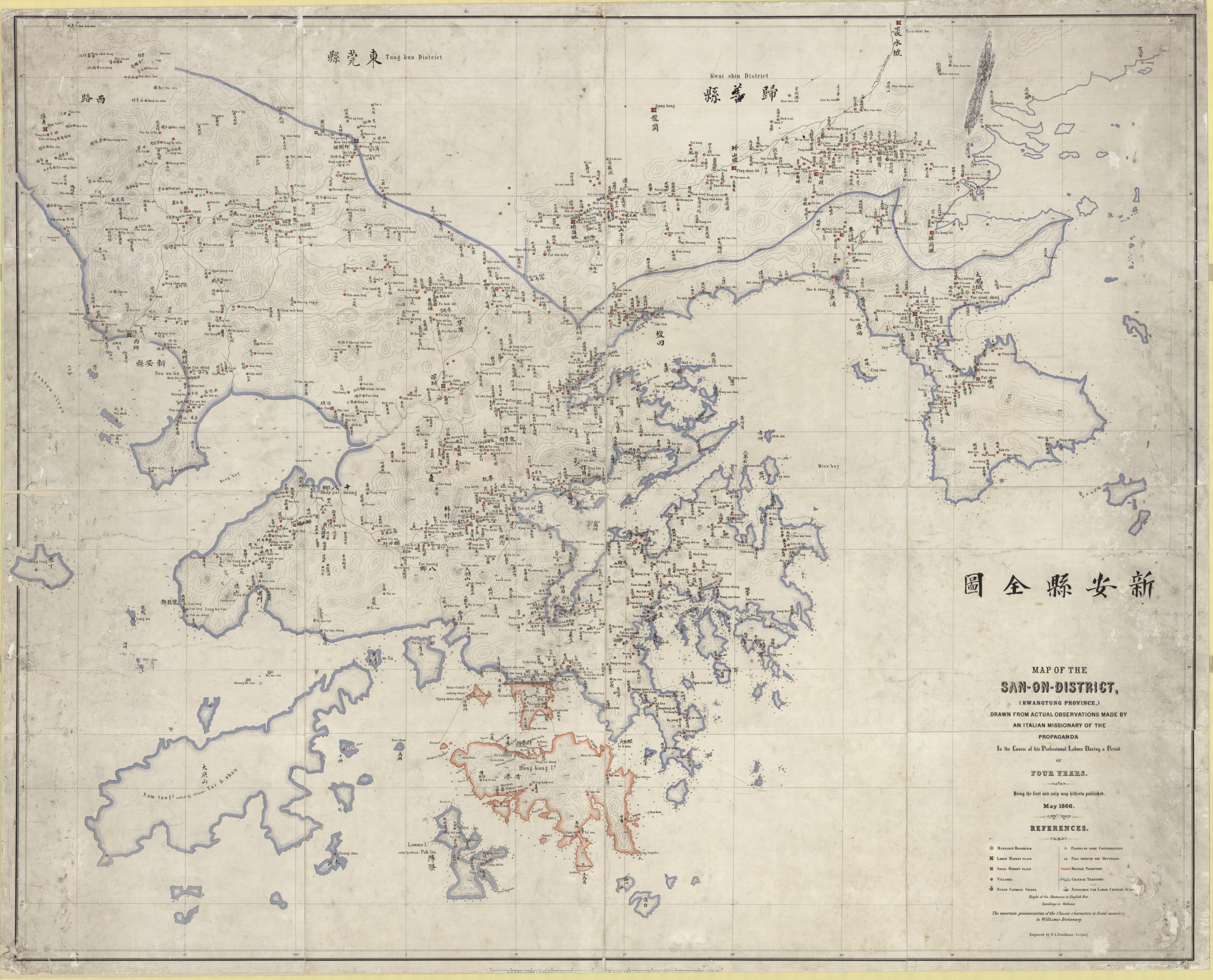
Map of the San-On District (Bao'an County), modern day Shenzhen and Hong Kong, created by Simeon Volonteri and published in 1866.

Simeone Volonteri (Chinese: 安西满) (June 6, 1831 – December 21, 1904) was an Italian missionary and a bishop of the Roman Catholic Church.

== Life ==
Simeone Volonteri was born in Milan, Italy. He joined the Pontifical Institute for Foreign Missions in 1855. He was in Hong Kong from 1860 to February 1870. During his stay in Hong Kong, he worked extensively in Tai Wo and Ting Kok. He was ordained bishop in 1874 by Eustachio Zanoli. He was Vicar Apostolic of Southern Honan (河南南境) (China) from August 28, 1882 to his death. He died in Fengqiao (冯桥), Shangqiu, in Henan province of China.

== Map of the San-On District ==
Simeone Volonteri published the "Map of the San-On District" in 1866. The map was engraved in Leipzig.

== See also ==
- Roman Catholic Diocese of Hong Kong
- Palaeopolis (Lydia)
