= Ta Ho Tun =

Coordinates: 22.370876°N 114.263094°E

Ta Ho Tun (Chinese: 打蠔墩) is a village in Sai Kung District, Hong Kong. It comprises Ta Ho Tun Ha Wai (打蠔墩下圍) and Ta Ho Tun Sheung Wai (打蠔墩上圍).

== Administration ==
Ta Ho Tun is a recognized village under the New Territories Small House Policy.
