= Pak Sha Wan Peninsula =

Peninsula in the Sai Kung District, Hong Kong

Coordinates: 22°21′44″N 114°16′19″E

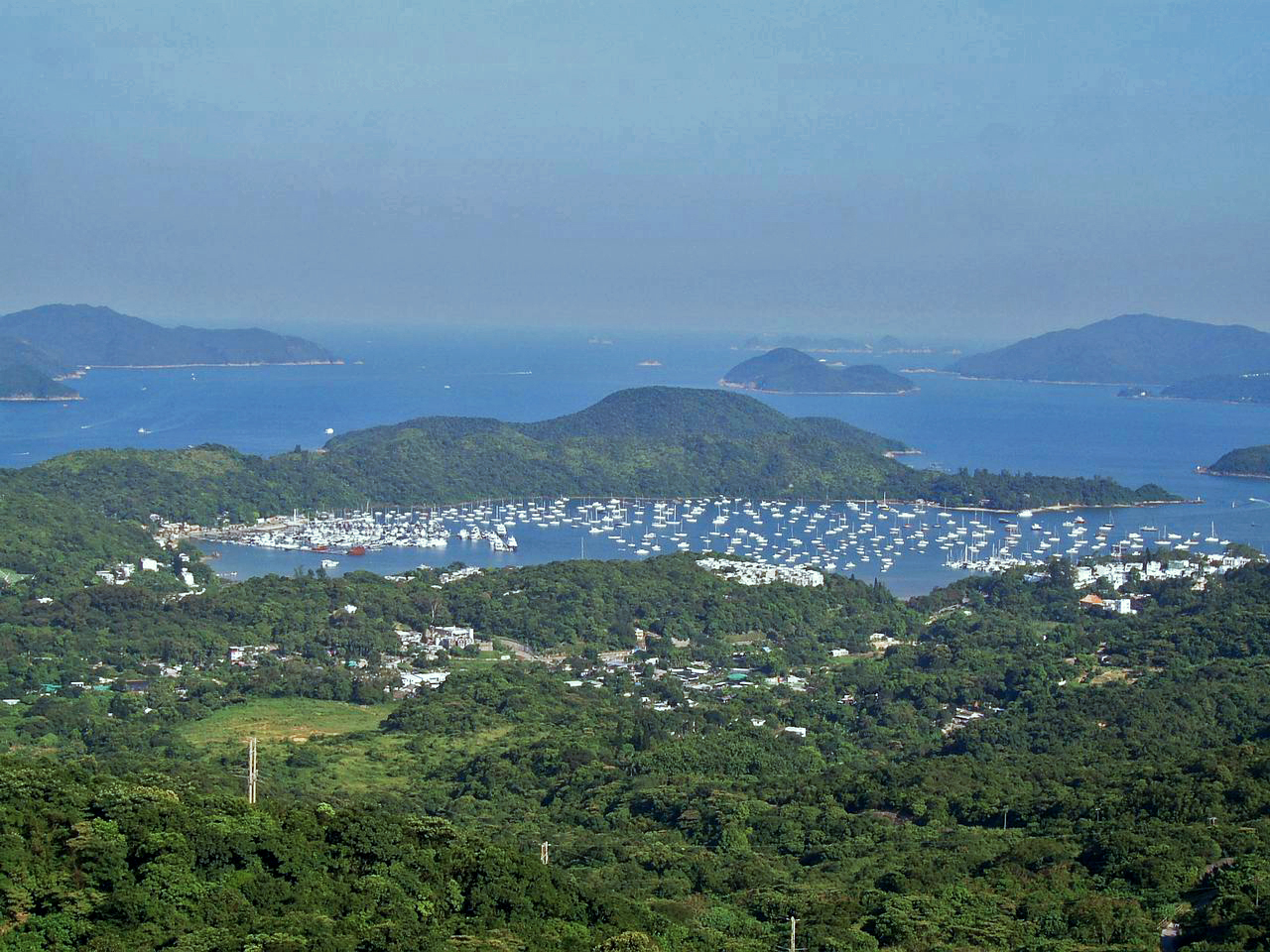
Hebe Haven and Pak Sha Wan Peninsula (centre).

Pak Sha Wan Peninsula (白沙灣半島; Cantonese Yale: baahk sā wāan bun dóu), also known as Ma Nam Wat Peninsula (麻籃笏半島), and sometimes referred to as Hebe Haven Peninsula, is a peninsula in the Sai Kung District in the New Territories of Hong Kong.

== Geography ==
Pak Sha Wan Peninsula spans south from the village of Tsiu Hang (蕉坑). It forms the eastern edge of Hebe Haven (白沙灣, Pak Sha Wan) and separates it from Inner Port Shelter (Sai Kung Hoi).

== Features ==
- Villages established along the shores of Pak Sha Wan Peninsula include Che Keng Tuk and Ma Nam Wat
- Most of the area of Pak Sha Wan Peninsula is part of the Ma On Shan Country Park
- A section of the waters offshore of Ma Nam Wat is one of the 26 designated marine fish culture zones in Hong Kong.
- Trio Beach is located on Pak Sha Wan Peninsula

== See also ==
- List of islands and peninsulas of Hong Kong
