= Tsiu Hang, North District =

Village in the Sha Tau Kok area of North District of Hong Kong

Coordinates: 22.545656°N 114.21647°E

Tsiu Hang (Chinese: 蕉坑) is a village in the Sha Tau Kok area of North District of Hong Kong.

== Administration ==
Tsiu Hang is one of the villages represented within the Sha Tau Kok District Rural Committee. For electoral purposes, Tsiu Hang is part of the Sha Ta constituency, which is currently represented by Ko Wai-kei.
