= Lions Nature Education Centre =

Coordinates: 22.3739°N 114.2643°E

- Traditional Chinese: 獅子會自然教育中心
Transcriptions
Yue: Cantonese
- Yale Romanization: Sī jí wúih jih yìhn gaau yuhk jūng sām
- Jyutping: Si1 zi2 wui5 zi6 jin4 gaau3 juk6 zung1 sam1

Lions Nature Education Centre

Lions Nature Education Centre is a facility situated on 34 hectares (84 acres) of land to the east of Hiram's Highway near Sai Kung Town, Hong Kong used for the purposes of public education, recreation, nature conservation and scientific studies. The centre includes many informative and attractive field and outdoor display areas, such as an arboretum, a rocks and mineral garden, a medicinal plants garden, a demonstration tree nursery, an insectarium and a shell house.

== Lions ECC Shell House ==
Lions ECC Shell House

Lions ECC Shell House is jointly sponsored by Lions Clubs International District 303, Shell Hong Kong Limited and Environmental Campaign Committee and now managed by Agriculture, Fishies and Conservation Department.

The Shell House displays several different shell species found in the Hong Kong environment, each of which bears a description of its composition, classification, characteristics, habitat and distribution, and anything else of special interest. Supplementing the displays are video programmes and information on the lime kiln industry, tree snails and corals in Hong Kong. The main objective of this museum is to increase people's awareness and to promote the conservation of sea life in Hong Kong.

Collections of shells in display cases are accompanied by descriptions of the different parts of shells. Other information, for example, how molluscs are classified and the characteristics of each of the five categories and how colours and patterns are formed are accompanied the displays. Their shapes, their sculptures, ornamentation and commercial uses can be known in details.

Other displays introduces detail classification, characteristics and items of special interest, as well as introduce the habitat and distribution of different of shells, for example, scallop shells, thorny oysters, nautilus shells, volutes shells, cowries, dangerous (poisonous) shells, mitres and murex shells and their relatives.

Display boards provide information on the lime kiln industry, codes of conduct and sea life conservation. Tree snails from around the world, corals found in Hong Kong and shellfish found in the seafood market are also on display in the Shell House.

Shell collection sample

Shell collection sample

Shell collection sample

== See also ==
- Tsiu Hang Special Area
- Kadoorie Farm and Botanic Garden
