= Hiram's Highway =

Road in Hong Kong

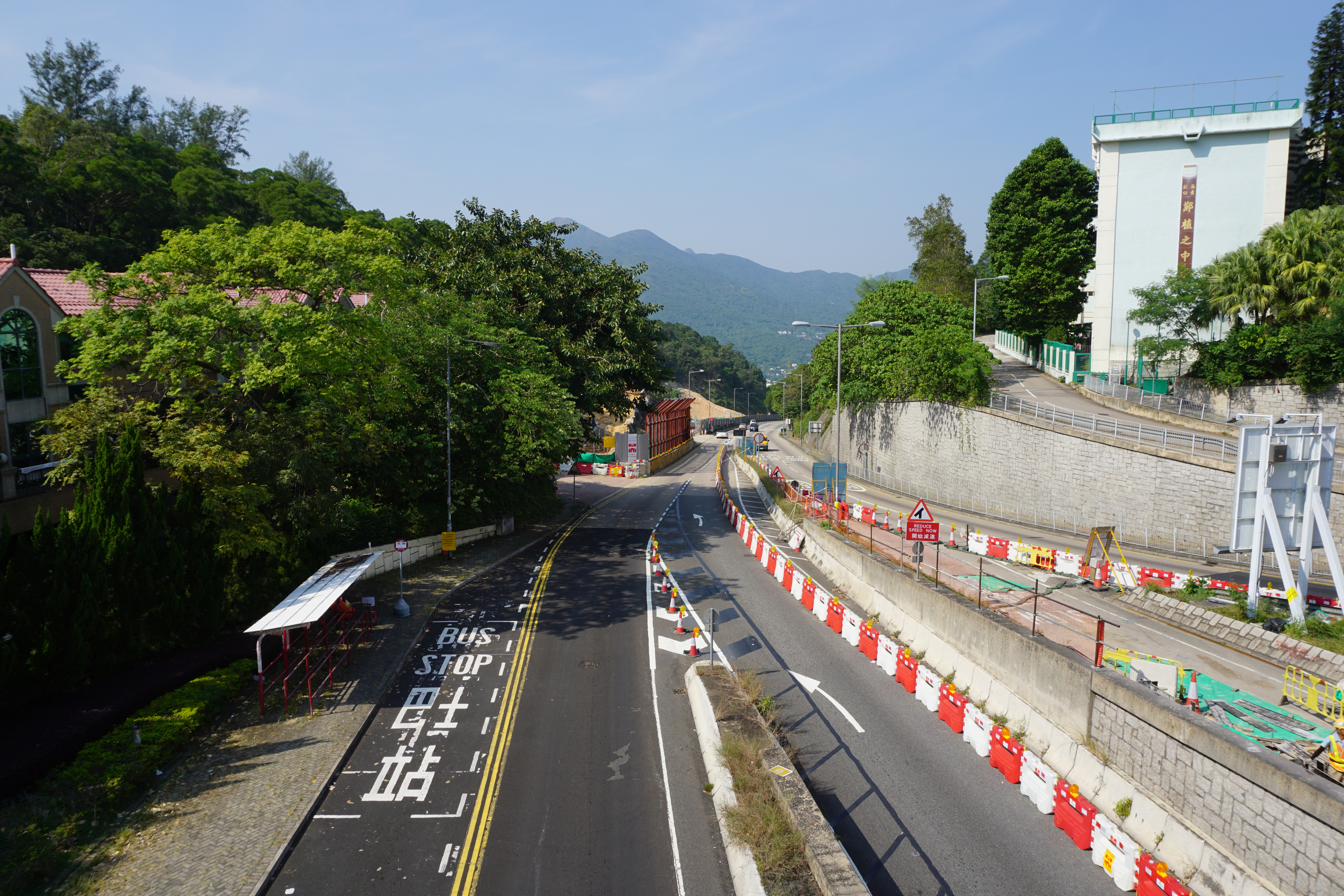
Hiram's Highway.

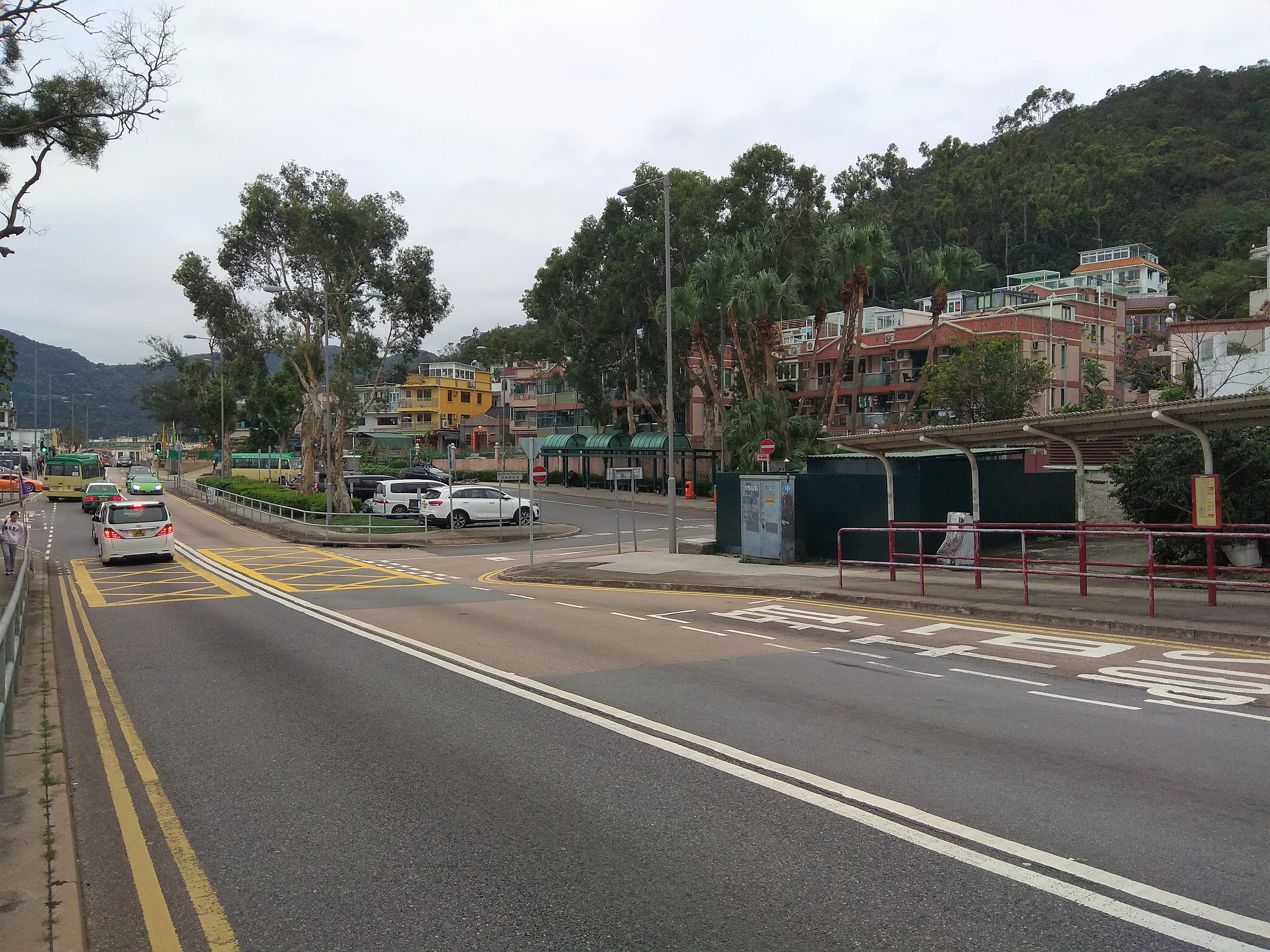
Hiram's Highway at Kau Sai San Tsuen.

Hiram's Highway (Chinese: 西貢公路; Jyutping: sai1 gung3 gung1 lou6) is a road in Hong Kong connecting the town of Sai Kung to the Clear Water Bay Road at Ta Ku Ling. It also connects with Po Tung Road in the north. Unlike other roads in Hong Kong with the word "Highway" as part of their names, the Hiram's Highway is not an expressway.

The road's Chinese name literally means "Sai Kung Highway". It earned its English name from the officer in charge of the Royal Marines who upgraded a Japanese track in the immediate post Second World War years. Major John Wynne-Potts was nicknamed Hiram because he shared the name "Potts" with the "Hiram K. Potts" American brand of tinned sausages. An embellishment of the story suggests he was "addicted" to the sausages.

Japanese prisoners of war were deployed in the road's construction. It was considered a reward to the people of Sai Kung for their resistance during the occupation.

A new straightened road, the New Hiram's Highway, near Nam Wai was opened in 2002 to provide an alternative route, bypassing a steep, twisty section of the original road.

== See also ==
- List of streets and roads in Hong Kong
