= Kiu Tsui Country Park =

Country park in Sai Kung District, Hong Kong

Coordinates: 22.36115°N 114.29544°E

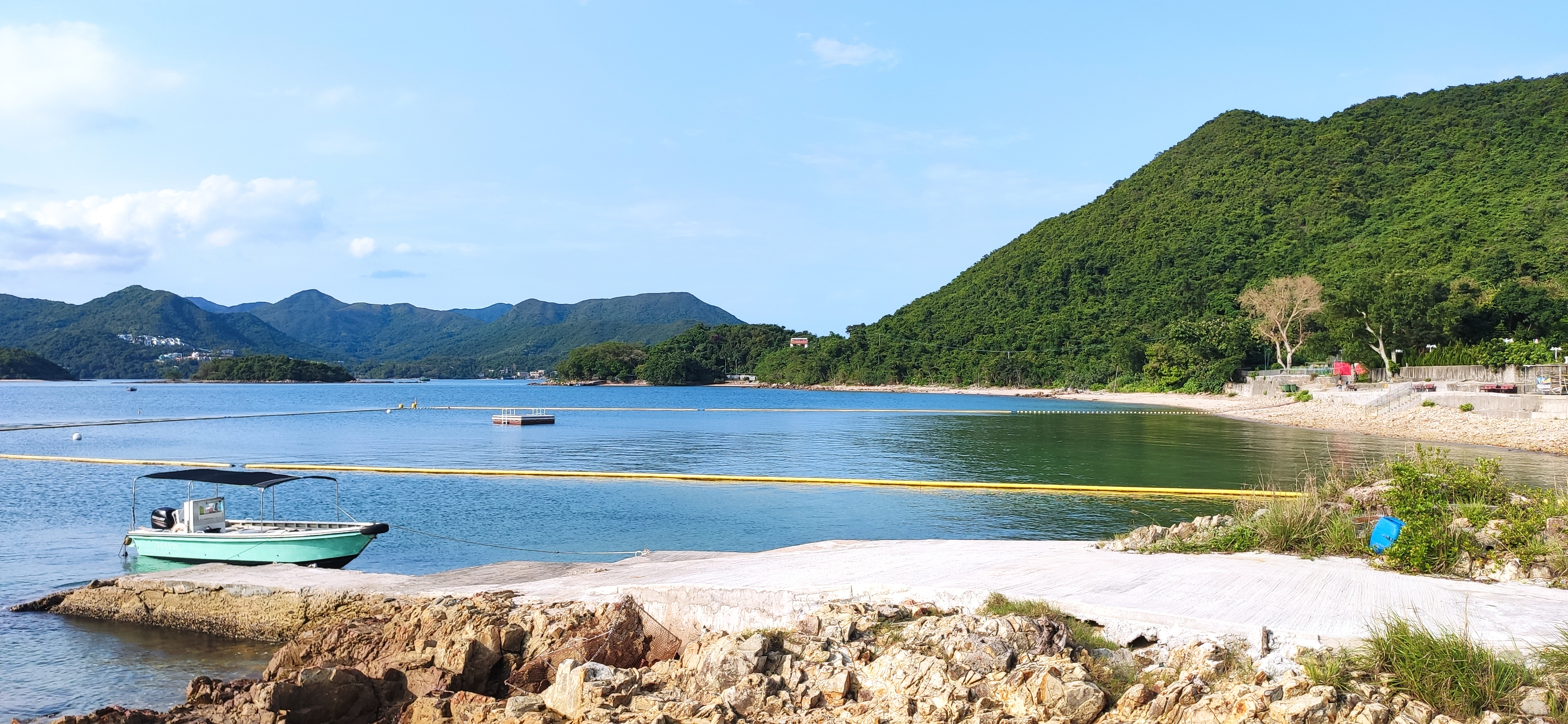
View from Kiu Tsui Beach.

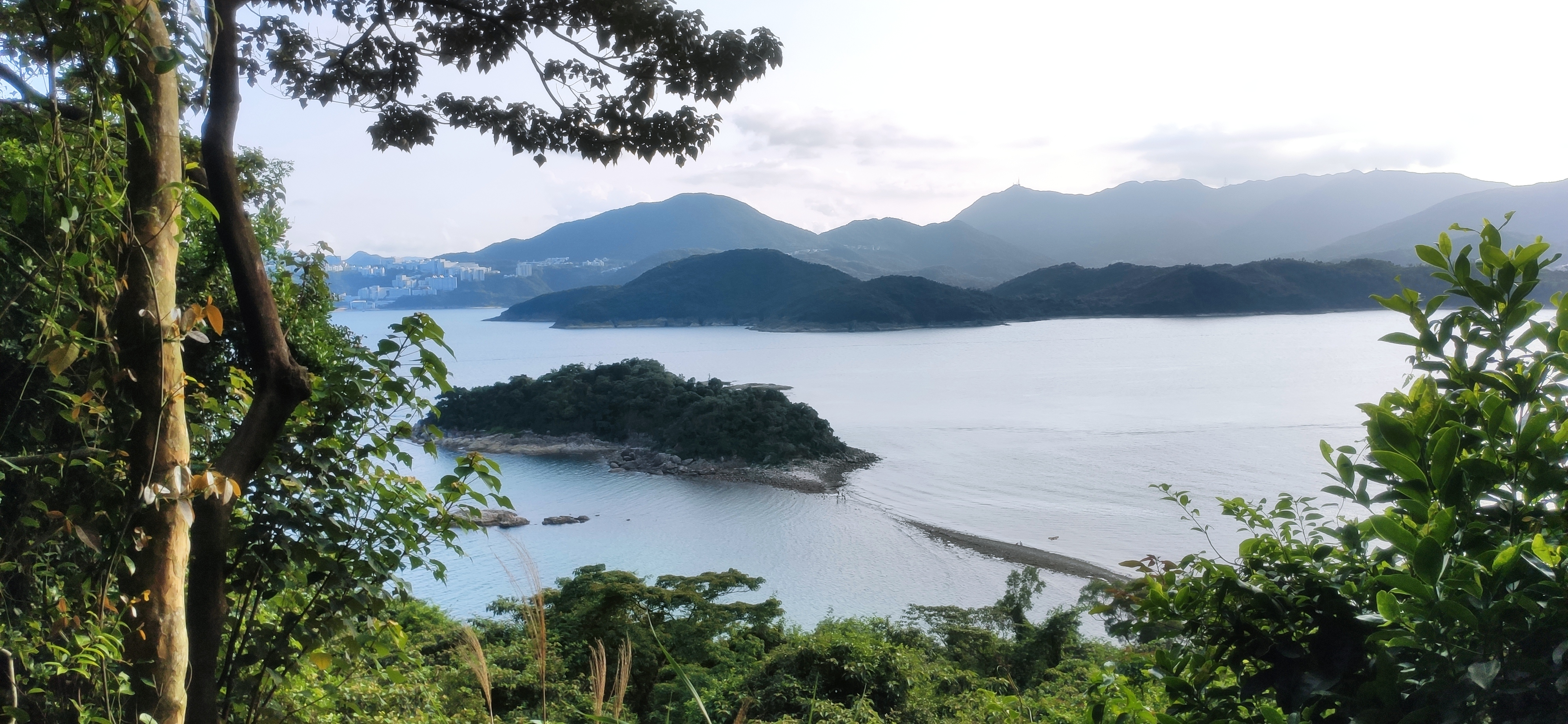
Kiu Tau and tombolo, viewed from Sharp Island.

Kiu Tsui Country Park (Chinese: 橋咀郊野公園) is a 1 square kilometre (0.39 sq mi) country park in Sai Kung District, Hong Kong. The park opened in 1979 and includes features such as:

- Hap Mun Bay Beach (廈門灣泳灘) on Sharp Island
- Kiu Tsui Beach (橋咀泳灘) on Sharp Island

The park has eight outlying islands within its boundaries:

- Kiu Tsui Chau (Sharp Island)
- Kiu Tau, an inshore islet linked to Sharp Island by a tombolo only at low tide
- Pak Sha Chau
- Tai Tsan Chau
- Siu Tsan Chau
- Cham Tau Chau
- Yau Lung Kok
- Tuen Tau Chau

== See also ==
- Inner Port Shelter
- Conservation in Hong Kong
