= Kiu Tsui Beach =

Beach in Sharp Island, New Territories, Hong Kong

- Beach
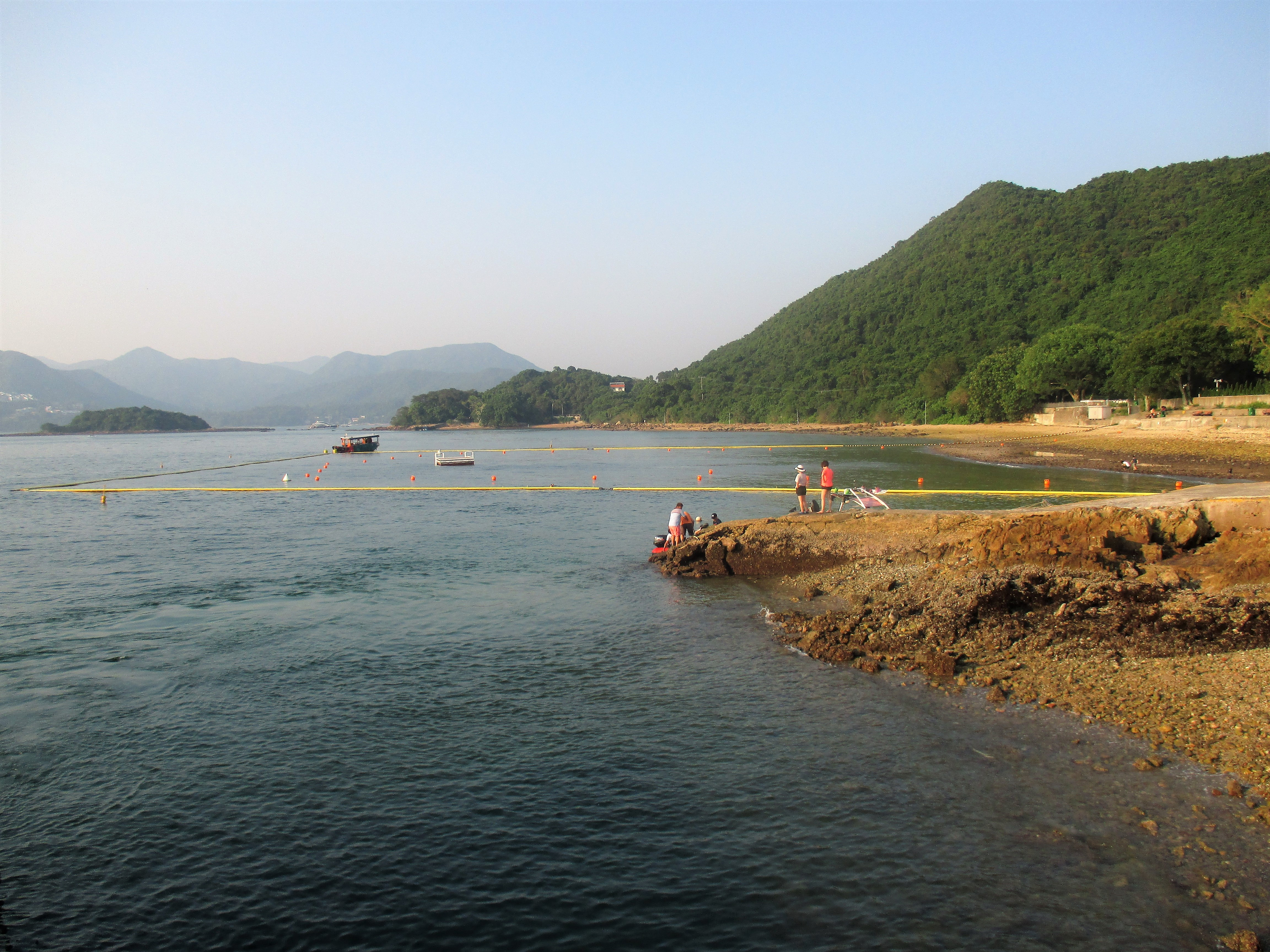
- Kiu Tsui Beach

- Location within Hong Kong
- Coordinates: 22.368138°N 114.288376°E
- Location: Sharp Island, New Territories

Dimensions
  - Length: 85 m (279 ft)
- Patrolled by: Leisure and Cultural Services Department

Kiu Tsui Beach
- Traditional Chinese: 橋咀泳灘
- Simplified Chinese: 桥咀泳滩
Transcriptions
Standard Mandarin
- Hanyu Pinyin: Qiáo Jǔ Yǒng Tān
Yue: Cantonese
- Jyutping: kiu4 zeoi2 wing6 taan1

Kiu Tsui Beach is a gazetted beach located facing Inner Port Shelter in the western side of Sharp Island, Sai Kung District, Hong Kong. The beach has barbecue pits and is managed by the Leisure and Cultural Services Department of the Hong Kong Government. The beach is 85 metres long and is rated as good to fair by the Environmental Protection Department for its water quality in the past twenty years. The beach offers views of Pak Sha Chau, Cham Tau Chau and Tai Chan Chau.

== History ==
In September 2018, the beach had to be temporarily closed due to the sewage being leaked into the sea near the beach from the Sai Kung Sewage Treatment Works. This was due to the Typhoon Mangkhut.

== Usage ==
The beach is much smaller than its neighbour, Hap Mun Bay Beach and tends to be the quieter of the two located in Sharp Island. The beach is also accessible by kai-to from Sai Kung Public Pier and is a nice beach in Hong Kong in terms of water quality and scenic environment.

== Features ==
The beach has the following features:

- BBQ pits (13 nos.)
- Changing rooms
- Showers
- Toilets
- Refreshment kiosk
- Water sports centre

== See also ==
- Beaches of Hong Kong
