= Shek Chau =

Shek Chau (Chinese: 石洲) is the name of two islands in Hong Kong:

- Shek Chau, Islands District, part of the Soko Islands group of islands, in Islands District
- Shek Chau, Sai Kung District, in Port Shelter, Sai Kung District
