= Shelter Island (Hong Kong) =

Island in Hong Kong, People's Republic of China

Native name: 牛尾洲 (Ngau Mei Chau)
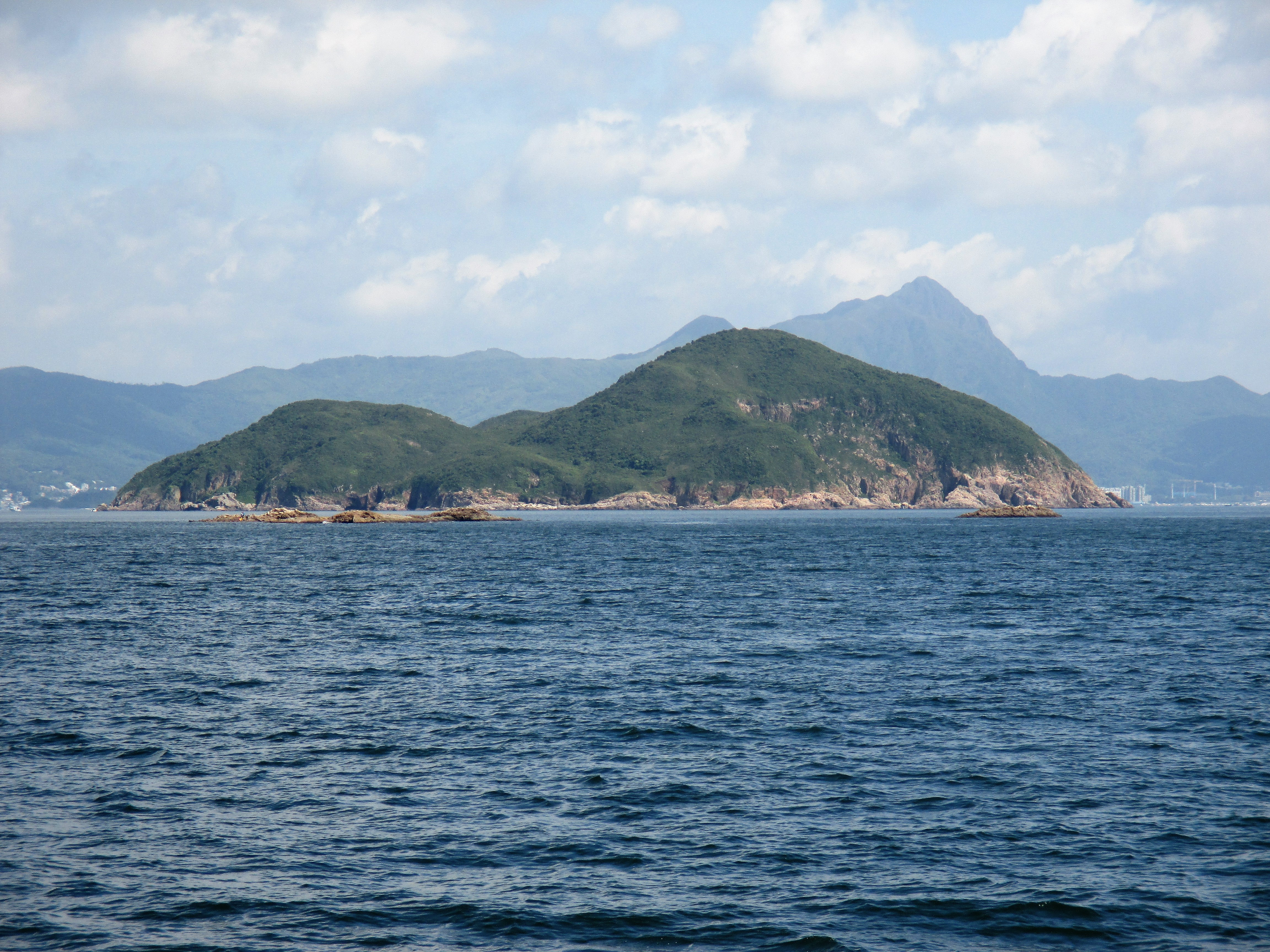
- Viewing Shelter Island from the sea

- Location within Hong Kong

Geography
- Location: Port Shelter, Sai Kung District, Hong Kong
- Coordinates: 22.326978°N 114.296214°E
- Area: 0.55 km^{2} (0.21 sq mi)
- Highest elevation: 117 m (384 ft)

Administration
- China
- SAR: Hong Kong
- Region: New Territories
- District: Sai Kung District

Additional information

Chinese name
- Chinese: 牛尾洲
- Literal meaning: Cow Tail Island
Transcriptions
Standard Mandarin
- Hanyu Pinyin: Niúwěi zhōu
Yue: Cantonese
- Yale Romanization: ngàuh méih jāu
- Jyutping: ngau4 mei5 zau1

Shelter Island, known in Cantonese as Ngau Mei Chau (Chinese: 牛尾洲), is an island located in the water body Port Shelter (Ngau Mei Hoi; literally Cow Tail Sea), in the Sai Kung District, the New Territories, Hong Kong S.A.R., China.

== History ==
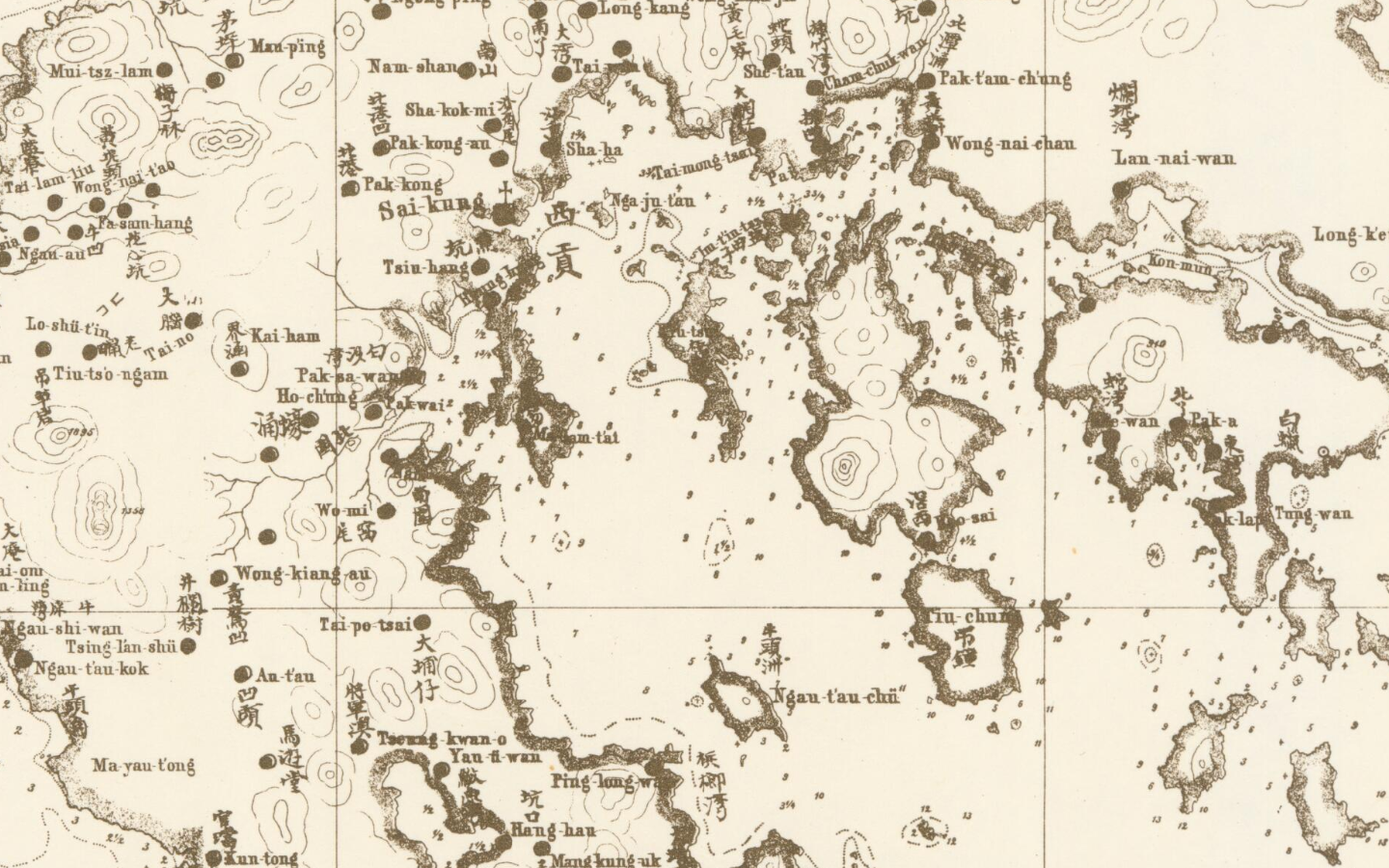
An enlarged section of an 1866 map of the Bao'an County, showing Sai Kung and surrounding area, including Ngau Mei Chau (marked in map as Ngau T'au Chü)

The island appeared on a map drawn by Father Simeone Volonteri and published in 1866, at that time it was marked as Ngau T'au Chü (Chinese: 牛頭洲; Jyutping: ngau4 tau4 zau1; Cantonese Yale: ngàuh tàuh jāu; lit. 'Cow Head Island'). However, there are criticisms on the accuracy of Volonteri's map in general, or for specific place names such as Green Hill, which was historically known as Tuen Mun Hill. There is a rock formation currently called Ngau Tau Pai (牛頭排), which connects to the island by intertidal zone. According to a book, Pai means rock, hill or mountain that locates in water body in general in the language of the Tanka people. It is not certain Volonteri's record is correct or not for the name of the island at that time.

The name 'Shelter island' appeared in a book for sailing directions that was published in 1863. In Asiatic Pilot by the U.S. Hydrographic Office in 1910, the island was described as 416 feet (127 m) high at that time. Shoal water extended northwards for 400 yards (370 m), and 300 yards (270 m) westwards from the island at that time.

The island was part of a larger region that was leased to the United Kingdom for 99 years in 1898.

According to the historical document of the District Office South, (Note: Not to be confused with the current Southern District, which geographically covers the southern Hong Kong Island. The historical District Office South administered the southern New Territories and New Kowloon as well as islands that belongs to the modern day Islands District.) the island was uninhabited when it was part of the Port Shelter Firing Range. The firing range was closed in the 1970s. In 2011, a mortar shell was discovered on a beach of the island. Administratively, the District Office South was replaced by the Sai Kung District Office as well as other District Offices after World War II. At present, Shelter Island is still administratively part of the Sai Kung District. It is part of Hang Hau East constituency of the Sai Kung District Council as of 2019 election, despite the island being uninhabited. In terms of environmental protection, the island is surrounded by the Port Shelter Water Control Zone.

In the 1970s, the island was used by Ng Shek-ho, a drug lord, and his associates as a place to hide their goods.

Nowadays, it is one of the tourist attractions of Sai Kung District. Specifically, the island is known for its sea cave, known in Chinese as 幽廊祕洞. The surrounding water of the island is a popular diving site. Such as the shallow waters in the bay Tai Wong Wan (大王灣), as well as west of Ngau Tau Pai, etc. Commercial divers also catch sea urchin near the island for their own restaurant.

In 2019, human bones were discovered in Tai Wong Wan.

== Biodiversity ==
24 species of vascular plants were discovered on the island.

Coral also appears in the water surrounding the island. However, a survey discovered that the coverage rate was decreasing, from 50.6% to 31.2%, according to the interpretation of Ming Pao in the survey's summary.

According to another research, Shelter Island has a high number of Drupella rugosa and Cronia margariticola, which preys on coral species Pavona decussata and Platygyra sinensis in the region. That research reported that the coverage of hard coral at Shelter Island was 50.2% at that time.

A marine park that covers Sharp Island, Tai Chau, Shelter Island and surrounding water was proposed by the Country and Marine Parks Board, a consultative body for the government in 2014. However, it did not materialize. In 2018, World Wide Fund for Nature also proposed to establish the Port Shelter Marine Protected Area, which also included Shelter Island.

== See also ==
- Ngau Tau Kok, a place in Kowloon, Hong Kong. It also named after "Cow Head" (Chinese: 牛頭).
