= Cham Tau Chau =

Small uninhabited island in Hong Kong

Coordinates: 22.37913°N 114.28887°E

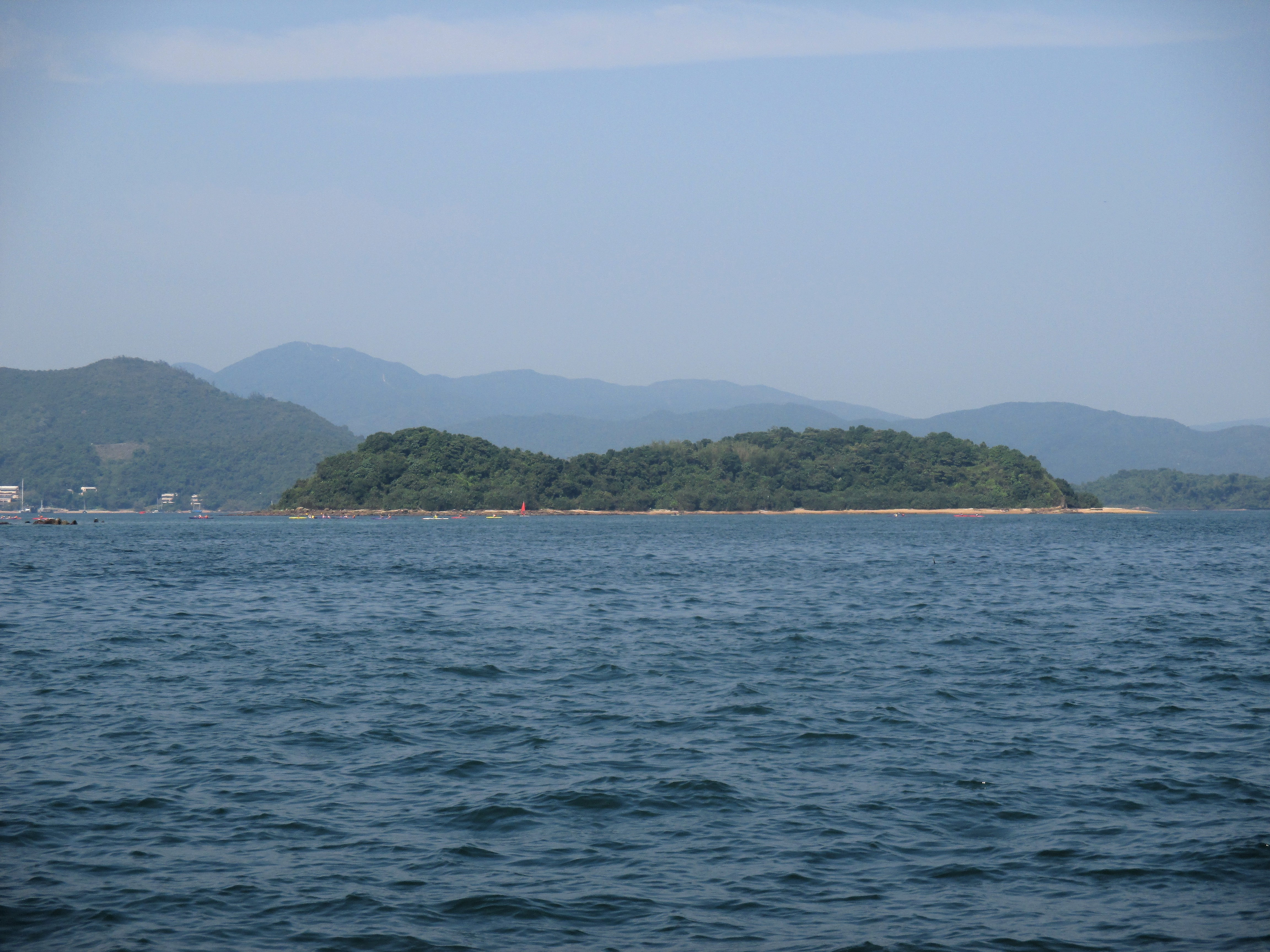
Cham Tau Chau

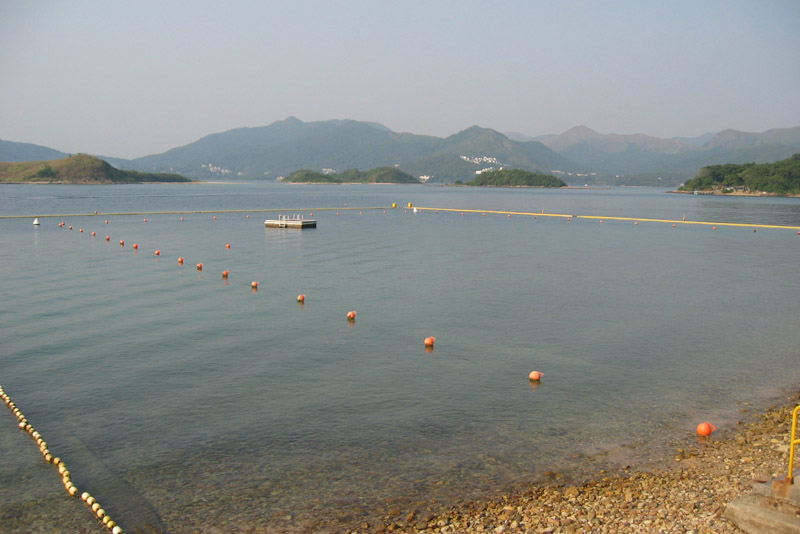
View from Kiu Tsui Beach of Sharp Island. Pak Sha Chau, Cham Tau Chau and Tai Tsan Chau are visible.

Cham Tau Chau (Chinese: 枕頭洲) is a small uninhabited island in Hong Kong. Administratively, it belongs to the Sai Kung District. It lies within the Inner Port Shelter, south of Sai Kung Peninsula, north of Sharp Island and Tai Tsan Chau (大鏟洲). Cham Tau Chau has a coastline of 0.8 kilometres.

== See also ==
- Kiu Tsui Country Park
