= Yim Tin Tsai =

Yim Tin Tsai (Chinese: 鹽田仔) is the name of two islands in Hong Kong:

- Yim Tin Tsai (Tai Po District), Hong Kong
- Yim Tin Tsai (Sai Kung District), Hong Kong
