= Ping Yeung =

Village in Hong Kong

Coordinates: 22.5352°N 114.1632°E

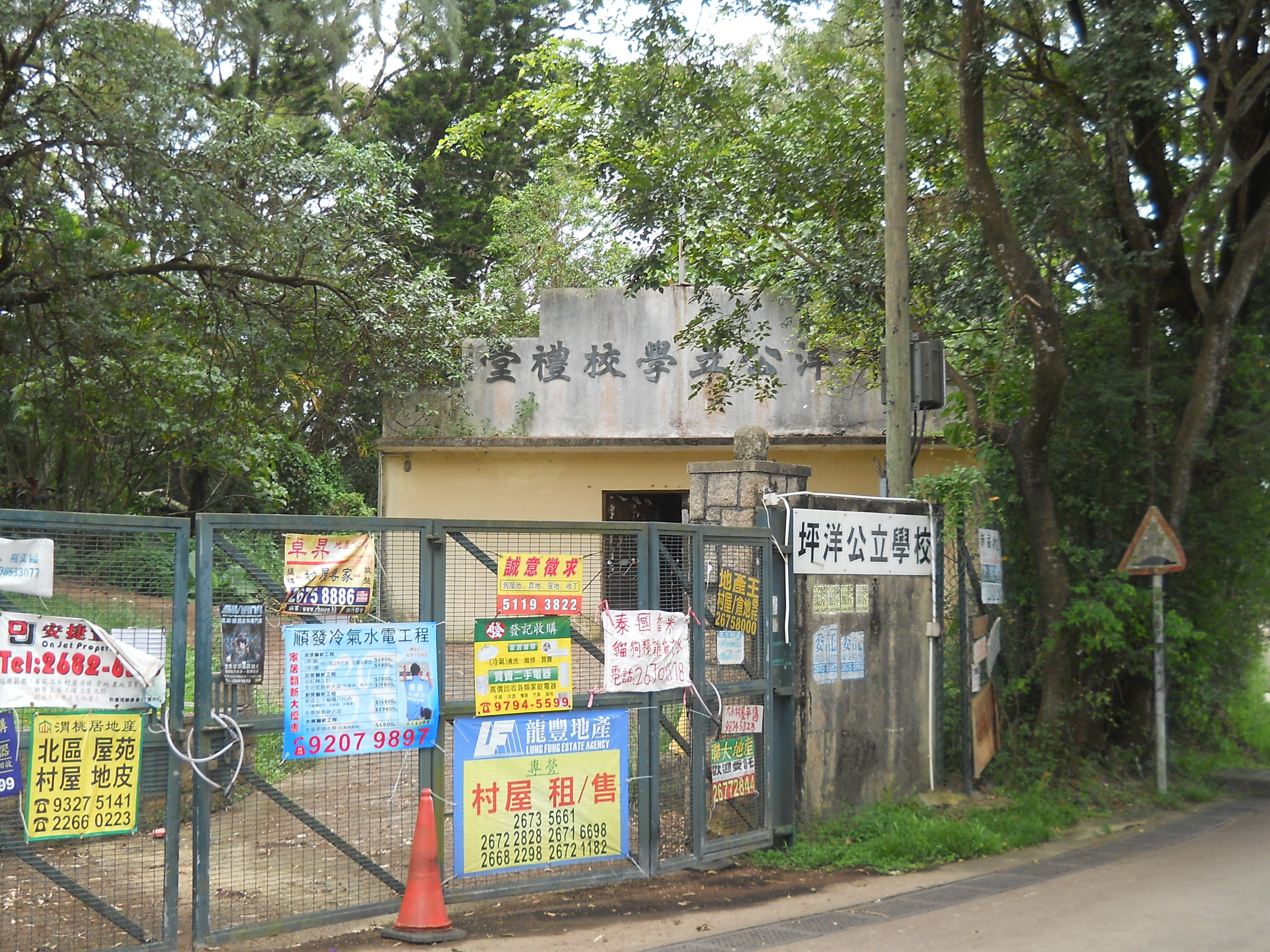
Ta Kwu Ling Ping Yeung Public School

Ping Yeung (Chinese: 坪洋) is a village in Ta Kwu Ling, North District, Hong Kong.

== Administration ==
Ping Yeung is a recognized village under the New Territories Small House Policy. It is one of the villages represented within the Ta Kwu Ling District Rural Committee. For electoral purposes, Ping Yeung is part of the Sha Ta constituency, which is currently represented by Ko Wai-kei.

== History ==
Members of the Hakka Chan (陳) clan moved from today's Shenzhen in mainland China and settled in Ping Yeung during the late 19th century. Other members of the clan settled in Yim Tin Tsai in Tai Po and Yim Tin Tsai in Sai Kung.
