= Pak Sha Chau (Sai Kung District) =

Island of Hong Kong

Coordinates: 22.37456°N 114.285612°E

Native name: 鴨洲
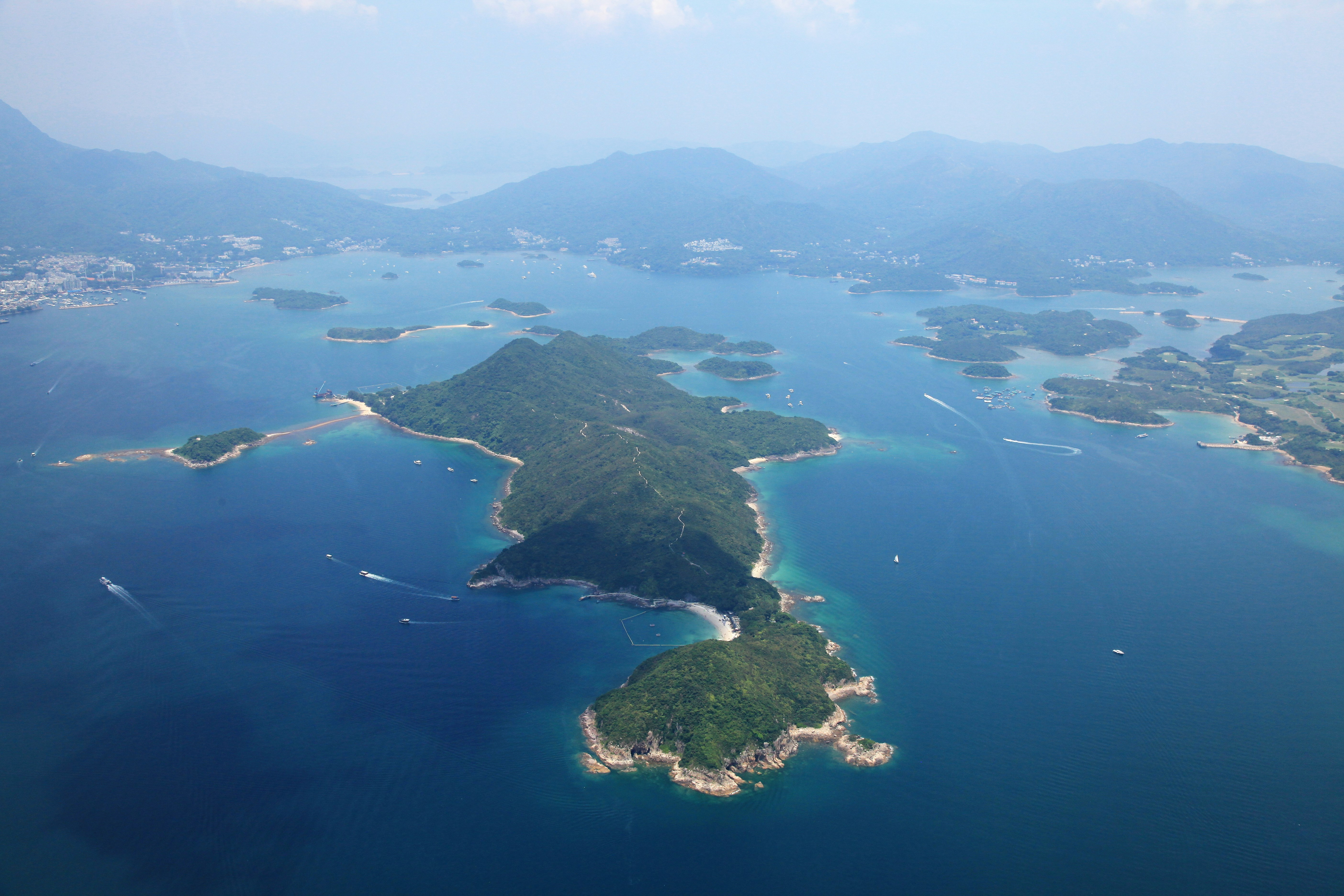
- Pak Sha Chau is the small island with tombolo located to the Northwest of Kiu Tsui Chau (Sharp Island) the biggest island centered in the photo.
- Interactive map of Pak Sha Chau

Administration
- Hong Kong
- Districts: Sai Kung District

Demographics
- Population: 0

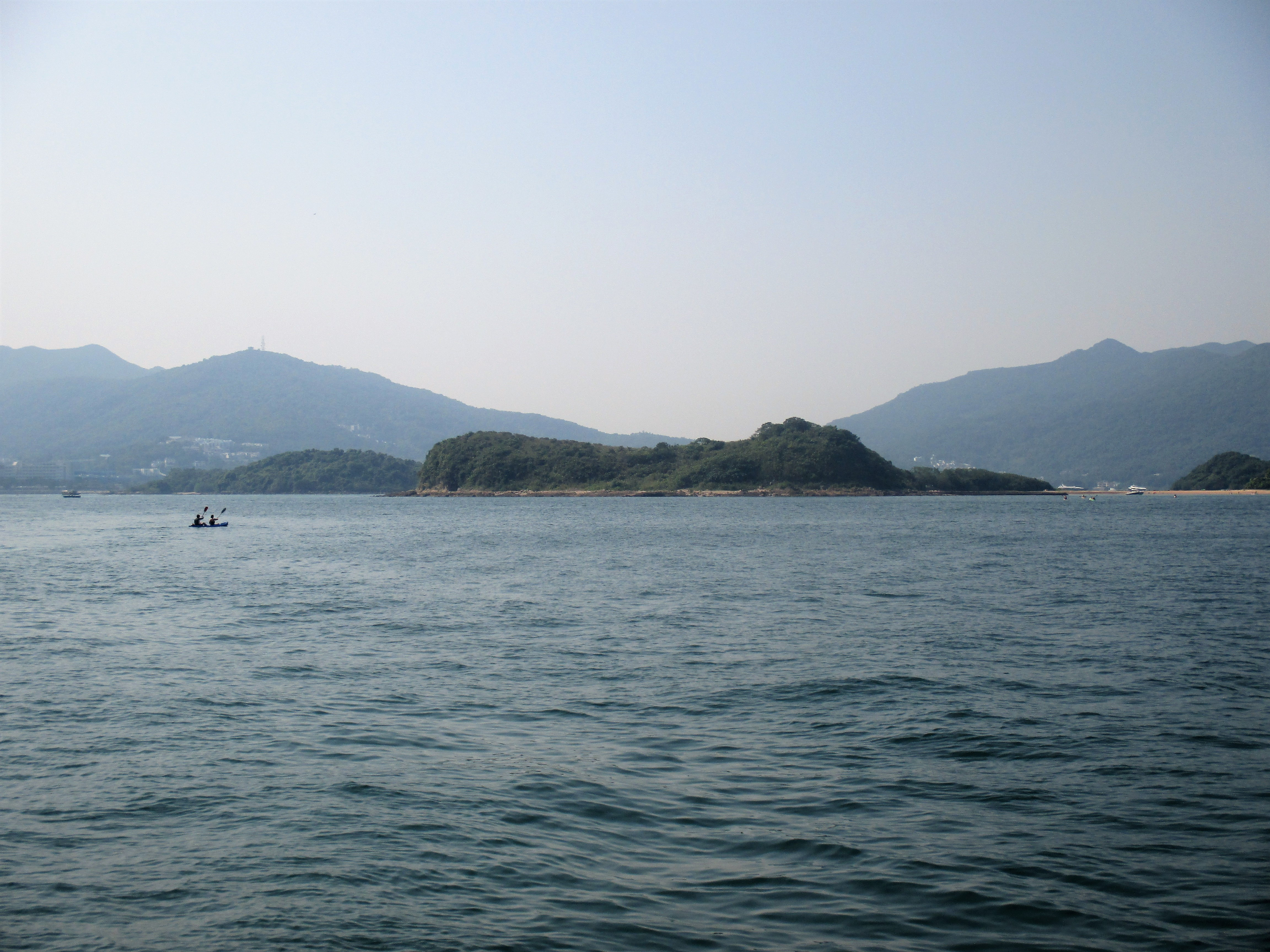
Pak Sha Chau (centre) viewed from the South. Siu Tsan Chau is the small island on the right.

Pak Sha Chau (Chinese: 白沙洲; pinyin: Báishā Zhōu; lit. 'White Sand Island') is an island of Hong Kong. Administratively, it is part of the Sai Kung District. Additionally it is part of the Kiu Tsui Country Park.

The island is connected to a smaller island, Siu Tsan Chau (小鏟洲), by a tombolo.

== See also ==
- List of islands and peninsulas of Hong Kong
- Port Shelter, the water body that surrounding the island
