= Kwun Cham Wan =

Small island in Port Shelter, Hong Kong

Coordinates: 22.373988°N 114.301114°E

Kwun Cham Wan (Chinese: 罐杉環) is a small island in Port Shelter, Hong Kong. It is under the administration of Sai Kung District.

Kwun Cham Wan is located off the southwestern coast of the island Yim Tin Tsai. It has a maximum elevation of 38 m and an area of 0.06 km^{2}.
