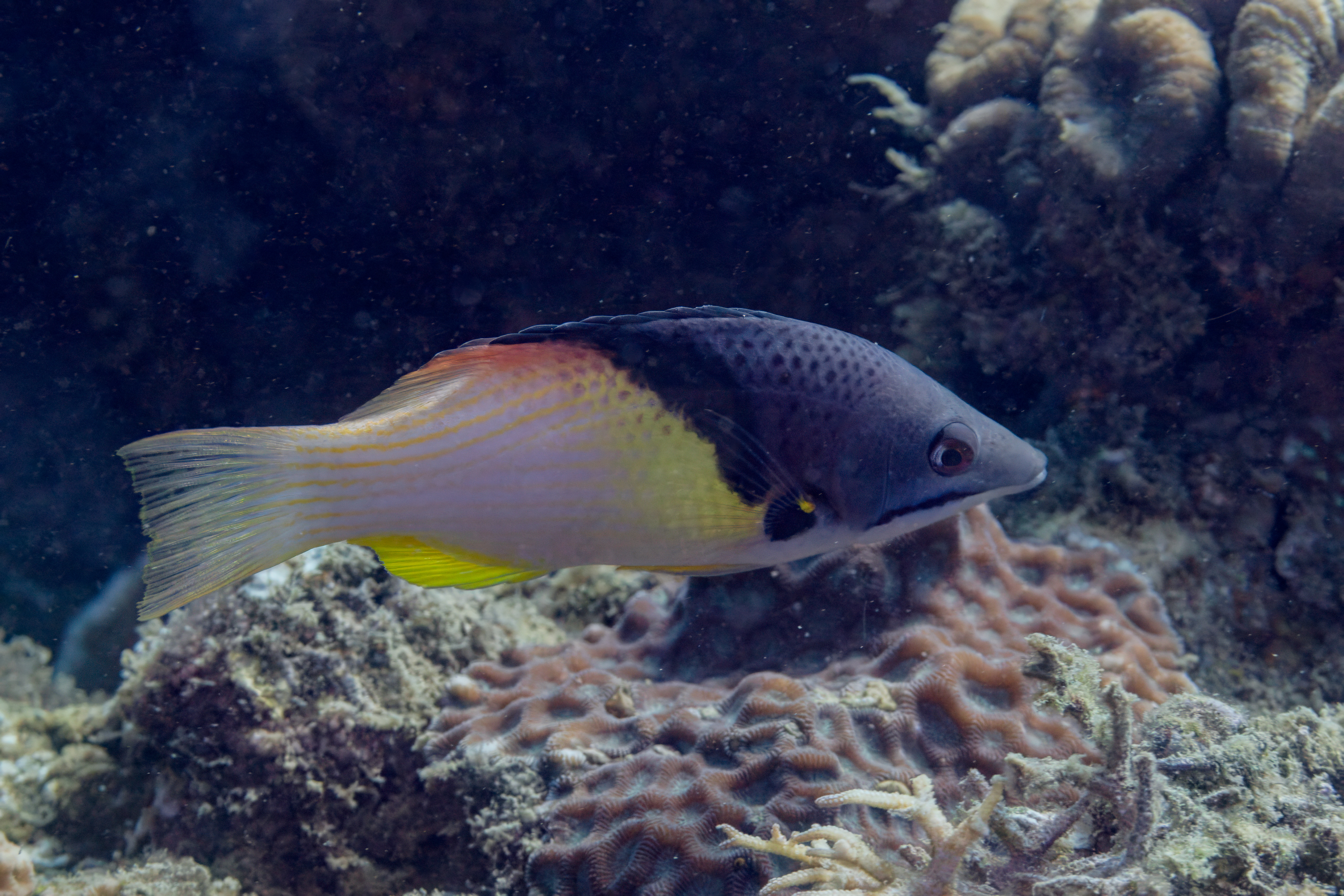
- Adult

Conservation status
- Least Concern (IUCN 3.1)

Scientific classification
- Kingdom: Animalia
- Phylum: Chordata
- Class: Actinopterygii
- Order: Labriformes
- Family: Labridae
- Genus: Bodianus
- Species: B. mesothorax

Binomial name
- Bodianus mesothorax (Bloch & Schneider, 1801)

Synonyms
- Labrus mesothorax Bloch & Schneider, 1801; Lepidaplois mesothorax (Bloch & Schneider, 1801); Scarus mordax Gronow, 1854

= Bodianus mesothorax =

Species of fish

Bodianus mesothorax, the split-level hogfish, blackbelt hogfish, coral hogfish, eclipse hogfish, eclipse pigfish, mesothorax hogfish or yellow-spotted hogfish, is a species of wrasse native to the western Pacific Ocean and the eastern Indian Ocean.

== Description ==
Adult Bodianus mesothorax has a distinct blackish diagonal band between the purplish head end of the body and the whitish to yellowish posterior part. The juveniles, in contrast, has a dark purple body speckled with bright yellow spots (juvenile axilspot hogfish (Bodianus axillaris) is similar, ahough this fish has white rather than yellow spots). The body pattern and coloration of juveniles change to the adult ones when they attain a length of 5 to 6 cm (2.0 to 2.4 in). They take only a few weeks to change completely, so intermediate fish are very rarely recorded. The adults are distinguished from adult axilspot hogfish by the dark diagonal band and the lack of spots on the dorsal and the anal fins.

== Distribution ==
Bodianus mesothorax is found as far as the Nicobar Islands in the Andaman Sea in the west, as far as Japan in the north, as far as Fiji in the east and as far as Australia in the south.

== Habitat and biology ==
Bodianus mesothorax can be found on reefs at depths of 5 to 40 m (16 to 131 ft), though they rarely venture below 20 m (66 ft); in particular, juveniles inhabit caves in the reef.

Adult Bodianus mesothorax acts as cleaner fish.

== In the aquarium ==
This species can be found in the aquarium trade, and is commonly imported from the Philippines and Indonesia.
