= Port Shelter =

- Inner Port Shelter, Outer Port Shelter
- 牛尾海 (Yue Chinese)
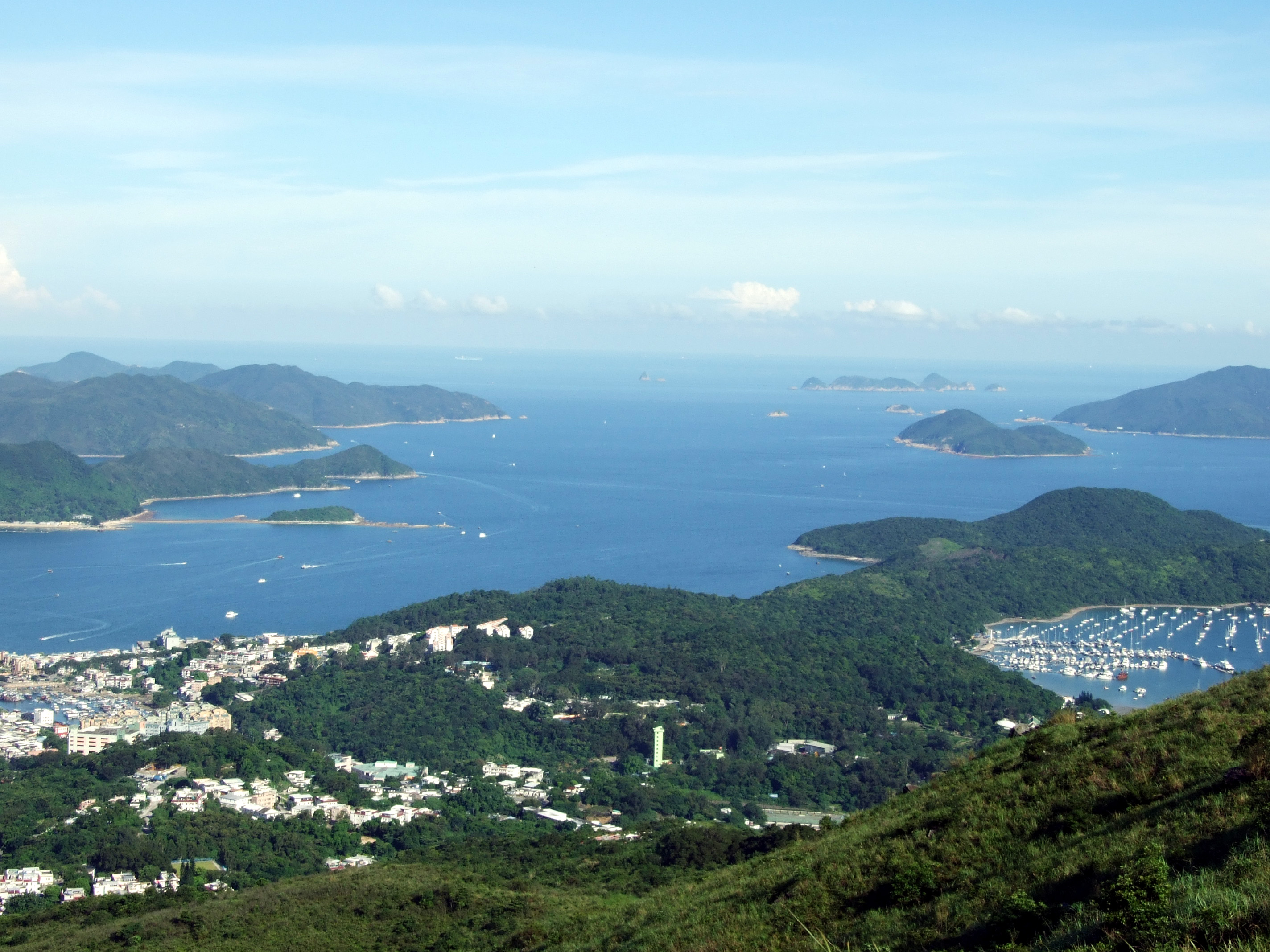
- View of Inner Port Shelter, Port Shelter and Outer Port Shelter from the nearby mountain. Sai Kung town centre can be seen at the left bottom. The right bottom is Hebe Haven

- Map of Hong Kong and the approximate location of the centre of Port Shelter

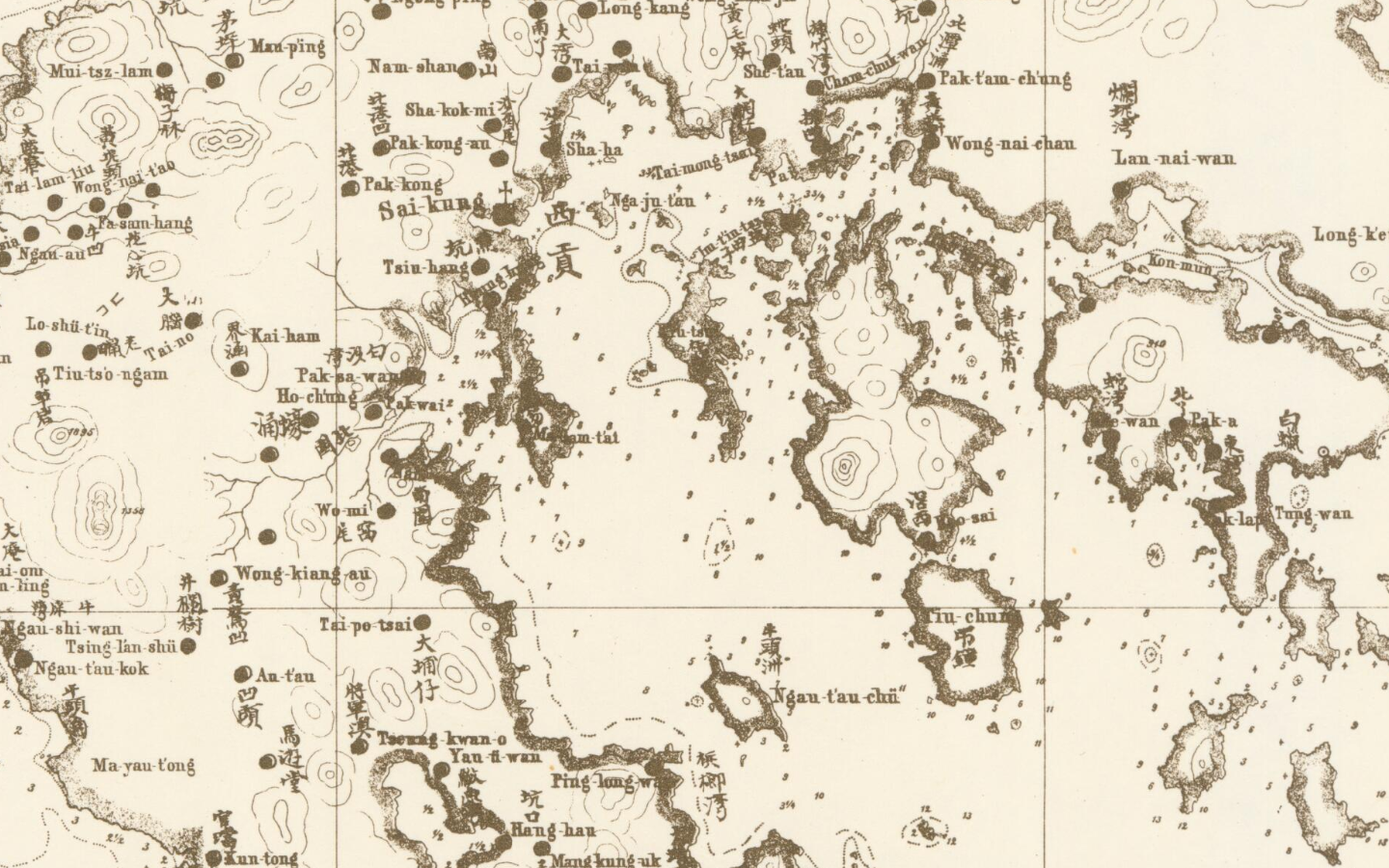
- Map of Xin'an County of 1866 (enlarged), showing the Port Shelter and the town Sai Kung
- Location: Sai Kung District, the New Territories, Hong Kong
- Coordinates: 22.342°N 114.289°E
- Type: Bay / harbour
- Part of: Eastern Waters of H.K. (physical); Port Shelter Water Control Zone (legal)
- Designation: water [pollution] control zone
- Salinity: 32.7 (measured in 2002–03; 3 sample points)

Port Shelter
- Chinese: 牛尾海
Transcriptions
Standard Mandarin
- Hanyu Pinyin: Niú wěi hǎi
Yue: Cantonese
- Yale Romanization: Ngàuh méih hói
- Jyutping: Ngau4 mei5 hoi2

Port Shelter, known in Cantonese as Ngau Mei Hoi (Chinese: 牛尾海; Jyutping: ngau4 mei5 hoi2; Cantonese Yale: ngàuh méih hói), is a harbour south of Sai Kung Peninsula in Hong Kong. The water body connects to Inner Port Shelter (known in Cantonese as Sai Kung Hoi; Chinese: 西貢海; Jyutping: sai1 gung3 hoi2; Cantonese Yale: sāi gung hói), as well as Hebe Haven (白沙灣), Rocky Harbour (糧船灣海) and other water body. Outer Port Shelter, is situated at the mouth of the harbour.

== Geography ==
The boundary of Port Shelter has different definition according to different sources. Publication of the U.S. Hydrographic Office, had stated the western shores of Keui Island (now known as Kau Sai Chau) and Jin Island, as well as eastern and north-east shores of the mainland area (now HKUST, Tseung Kwan O New Town and Clear Water Bay Peninsula), were the boundaries of Port Shelter. The Hydrographic Office also stated the entrance of the harbour lies between Lung Ha Wan (龍蝦灣; located in Clear Water Bay Peninsula) and [a] Peaked Rock [sic], with a width of about 1.5 miles (2.4 km). Earlier publication of the Office, had stated the peaked rock is located 300 yards (270 m) south of Jin Island. The rock was 44 feet (13 m) above water at that time.

Inner Port Shelter is located near the head of Port Shelter, while Hebe Haven was classified as an inlet in the western shore of Port Shelter. The entrance of Inner Port Shelter lies between Yingam Tow [sic] and a line of rocks that extended from Kiau To [sic], an islet (now spells as Kiu Tau; Chinese: 橋頭; Jyutping: kiu4 tau4; Cantonese Yale: kìuh tàuh). The islet itself is connected to Sharp Island (Kiu Tsui Chau; Chinese: 橋咀洲; Jyutping: kiu4 zeoi2 zau1; Cantonese Yale: kìuh jéui jāu) by a bank. The bank, or known as a sand levee or a tombolo, is part of the Hong Kong UNESCO Global Geopark.

While The Hydrographic Office's 1943 publication did not have the definition of Outer Port Shelter, H.K.'s Agriculture, Fisheries and Conservation Department had deployed artificial reef to the Outer Port Shelter in the 2000s. They defined the area by coordinates instead. Roughly, it is a triangular area between Steep Island, Basalt Island and the southern shore of Jin Island (known as Tiu Chung Chau in the publication).

Environmental Protection Department, partnered with local universities, also conducted water quality and phytoplankton research in the Port Shelter. In their research, they used a border definition of the area, which their Port Shelter includes Port Shelter proper, Inner and Outer Port Shelter as well as Hebe Haven, and is a bay that "bordered on its northernside by the Sai Kung Peninsula and on its west and southwestern sides by the Clear Water Bay Peninsula". They also found out that, some data point of their research, are obviously influenced by surface runoff and pollution loading from the surrounding catchment area.

=== Islands ===
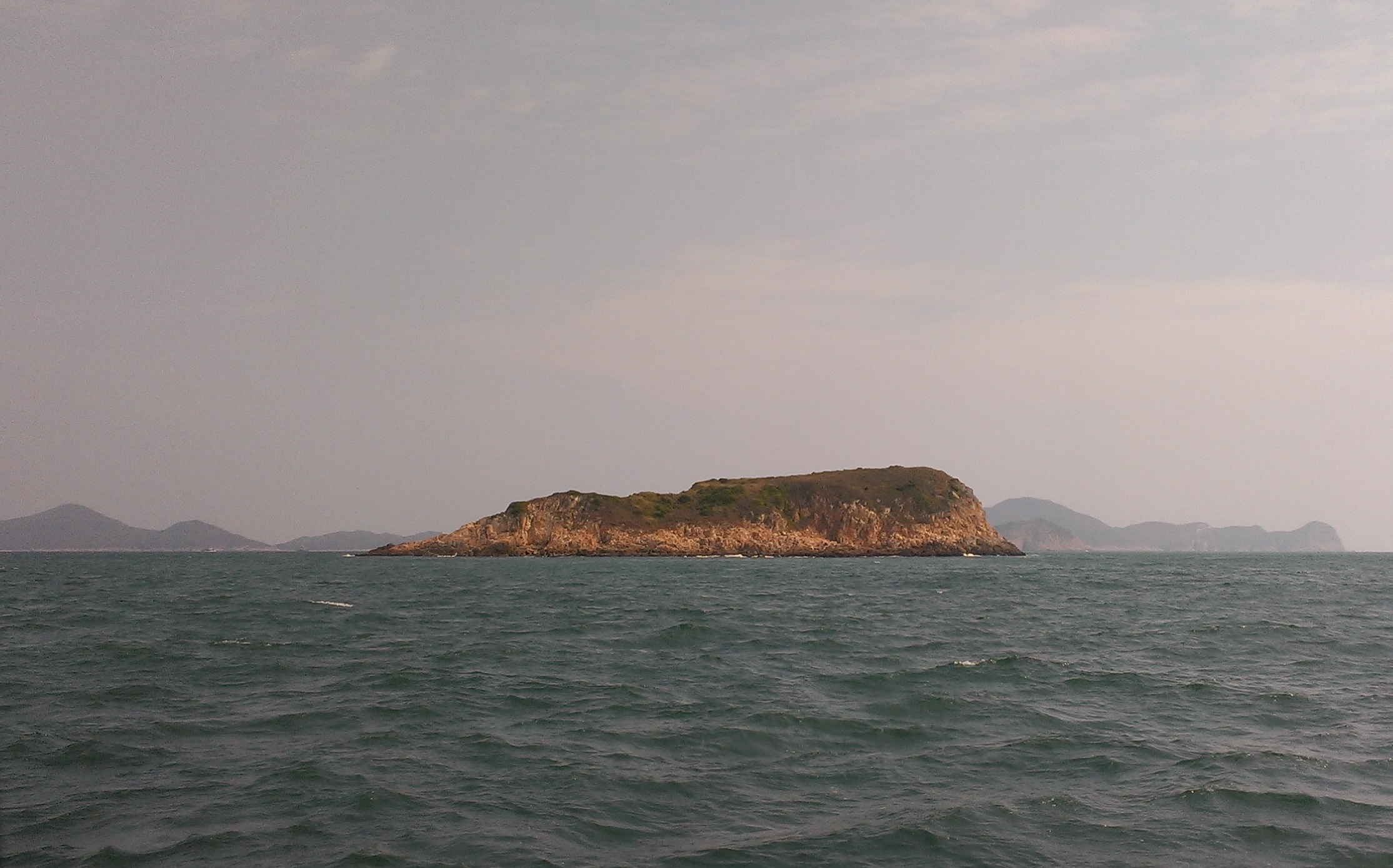
Ping Min Chau as seen from the West

These islands are considered within the boundary of the water body of the Port Shelter proper: The three largest islands were Kau Sai Chau, Jin Island and Sharp Island respectively.

- Kau Sai Chau (滘西洲)
- Jin Island (吊鍾洲; Tiu Chung Chau)
- Sharp Island (橋咀洲; Kiu Tsui Chau)
- Shelter Island (牛尾洲; Ngau Mei Chau)
- Yim Tin Tsai (鹽田仔)
- Kwun Cham Wan (罐杉環)
- Tuen Tau Chau (斷頭洲)
- Yau Lung Kok (游龍角)
- Table Island (平面洲; Ping Min Chau)
- Mong Chau Tsai (芒洲仔)
- Shek Chau (石洲)

Note: the book Southern District Officer Reports: Islands and Villages in Rural Hong Kong, 1910–60 also listed High Island, Town Island and Ninepin Group in their chapter "The Islands of Port Shelter". But the first two are located in Rocky Harbour, and the last one is outside the mouth of Outer Port Shelter.

==== Within Inner Port Shelter ====
These islands are considered within the boundary of the water body of Inner Port Shelter:

- Yeung Chau (羊洲)
- Pak Sha Chau (白沙洲)
- Cham Tau Chau (枕頭洲)
- Kiu Tau (橋頭)
- Tai Tsan Chau (大鏟洲)
- Tai Chau (大洲)
- Lap Sap Chau (垃圾洲)
- Siu Tsan Chau (小鏟洲)

=== Freshwater discharge ===
The greater Port Shelter area receives discharge from Ho Chung River (蠔涌河), Tai Chung Hau Stream (大涌口溪), and Sha Kok Mei Stream (沙角尾溪), as well as man-made storm outfalls and a submarine outfall from the Sai Kung Sewage Treatment Works.

=== Physical properties ===
According to measurements by a research, the average salinity of their three sampling stations was 32.7. All stations are located inside Port Shelter. The measurements, conducted from 4 October 2012 to 15 April 2013, also found that the average water temperature was 19.1 °C (with a range from 15.8 °C to 27.8 °C), as well as pH (acidity) of 8.08, with range from 7.62 to 8.35. They also recorded the vertical profile for some of their measurements.

Another research, recorded and estimated the tidal flushing time of the greater Port Shelter area which their tidal stations were deployed in the Port Shelter proper, as well as in Rocky Harbour, Hebe Haven, Inner Port Shelter and Outer Port Shelter. Such as a station at Leung Shuen Wan (糧船灣; or known as High Island) and in Po Toi O. They concluded that in the inner [sic] Port Shelter, the flushing time is the longest among the fish culture zones of Hong Kong, which is 40 days in the dry season. While Po Toi O is located at the mouth of Port Shelter [sic], its hydrodynamics is mainly affected by the open ocean, thus the flushing time was just 5.3 days in dry season in the computer estimation.

=== Biodiversity ===
A research conducted in 2006, had recorded a total of 106 fish species in Port Shelter in their preliminary report, including rare species Cephalopholis urodeta, Bodianus axillaris and Echidna nebulosa.

== History ==
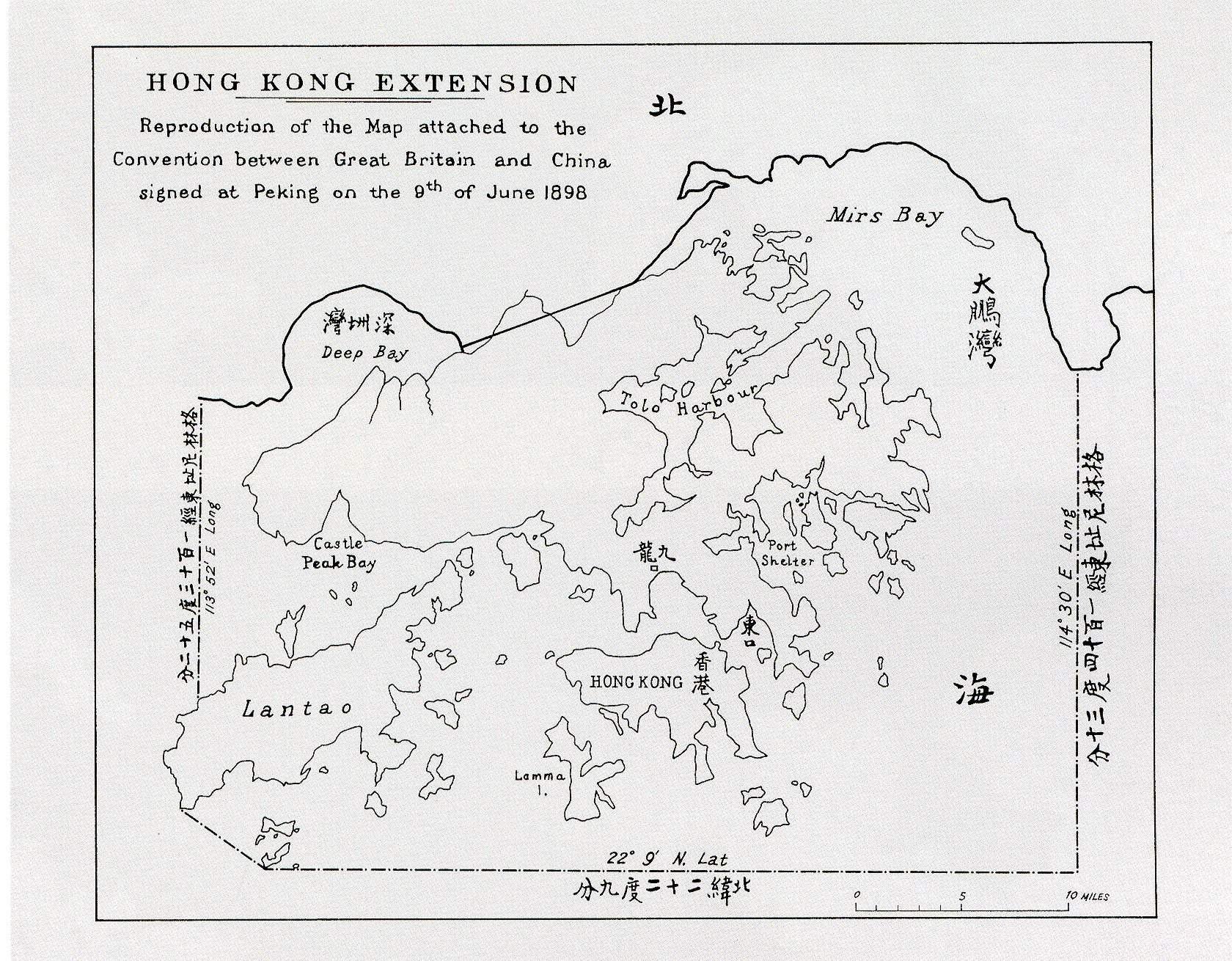
Map of the Convention for the Extension of Hong Kong Territory, showing Port Shelter at the right

A 1863 book states that Port Shelter and Rocky Harbour are the two main components of a deep bay. At that time the water body was still part of the Qing Empire, under the Xin'an County.

Port Shelter was also mentioned in a report to the UK government in 1898 by James Stewart Lockhart, shortly after the signing of the Convention for the Extension of Hong Kong Territory. It stated the harbour is a deep water port that suitable for ships in any size. The Convention ceded Port Shelter and other areas that collectively known as the New Territories and New Kowloon, to the British Empire, as an extension of the colony of Hong Kong.

In the past, villagers from the six villages of Pak Tam Chung would collect coral from Port Shelter to make lime. Nowadays, fishermen still catch sea urchins in the Port Shelter.

== Related administrative areas ==
=== Former Port Shelter Firing Range ===
In 1950, [sic] (some source said 1936) the harbour and some islands were part of the Port Shelter Firing Range, an outdoor firing range for the British military that stationing on the colony. Most of the range ceased to be used in the 1970s. The government also relocated the residents of Kau Sai Chau, an island in the firing range to the land area of Hebe Haven (known as Pak Sha Wan in the publication) in the 1950. The permanent housing was completed in 1954.

In 2011, a mortar shell was discovered on Shelter Island, which was formerly part of the firing range.

=== Port Shelter Water Control Zone ===
Despite there is no legal definition of the boundary of the water body, a related concept Port Shelter Water Control Zone had a legally defined boundary. It was regulated by the Water Pollution Control Ordinance (Chapter 358 of the Law of Hong Kong) as well as "Water Pollution Control (Port Shelter Water Control Zone) Order" (Chapter 358M) and other regulations. The water control zone covers not only the Port Shelter and Inner Port Shelter proper, but also Hebe Haven, Sham Tuk Mun (深篤門), Tsam Chuk Wan (斬竹灣), Rocky Harbour (糧船灣海) and many other surrounding water body.

In 2018, Typhoon Mangkhut damaged the Sai Kung Sewage Treatment Works, which just bordering the water control zone. After emergency repairs, the government did not find the water quality of the water control zone had become worse.

=== Outer Port Shelter Marine Park (proposed) ===
Another related and overlapping concept, the proposed Outer Port Shelter Marine Park, was scrapped in 2014. The proposed size of the marine park was 381.1 hectares (942 acres).

In 2018, World Wide Fund for Nature proposed to establish Port Shelter Marine Protected Area. They proposed to turn at least 30% area of Port Shelter to be a no-take zone. Their definition of Port Shelter was excluding Hebe Haven, Outer Port Shelter and part of Inner Port Shelter, with a size of 2,500 hectares (6,200 acres).

Port Shelter, Inner Port Shelter, along with Rocky Harbours were also included in a proposed fisheries protection area in the 2000s, while Outer Port Shelter was listed as a no-take zone.

=== As Specified Sheltered Waters ===
In the Schedule 2 of the Merchant Shipping (Certification and Licensing) Regulation (Chapter 548D of H.K. Law), they defined Port Shelter, in Specified Sheltered Waters context. For the purpose of that regulation, they defined Port Shelter Area as:

The waters of Port Shelter bounded on the north and west by the mainland shore, on the south and east by a straight line drawn from position 22°20.111′N 114°16.207′E to the southern extremity of Sharp Island (Kiu Tsui Chau), thence by a straight line drawn true east to the shore of Kau Sai Chau at position 22°21.177′N 114°18.237′E, thence along the western shore of Kau Sai Chau to a causeway at position 22°22.386′N 114°18.284′E, thence along the southern side of the causeway to the southern shore of Yim Tin Tsai, thence along the western, northern, eastern and southern shore of Yim Tin Tsai, and the northern side of the causeway back to the shore of Kau Sai Chau, thence along the northern shore of Kau Sai Chau to the breakwater light of Yim Tin Tsai Typhoon Shelter, and thence by a straight line drawn true north to the mainland at position 22°23.144′N 114°18.401′E.

The specified sheltered water that defined from above coordinates and natural boundaries, actually covers the Inner Port Shelter and Hebe Haven but only part of Port Shelter, that defined by the publication of the U.S. Hydrographic Office, which draw the southern boundaries from Lung Ha Wan to a peaked rock south of Jin Island.

That regulation also defined "Port Shelter and Rocky Harbour Area" that cover all of the Port Shelter (and some part of Outer Port Shelter by some definitions) and Rocky Harbour:

The waters of Port Shelter and Rocky Harbour bounded on the north and west by the mainland shore and on the south and east by a straight line drawn from the eastern shore of Lung Ha Wan at position 22°18.632′N 114°18.199′E to the southern extremity of Ping Min Chau, thence by a straight line drawn to the north-westernmost point of Bluff Island (Sha Tong Hau Shan) at position 22°19.507′N 114°21.015′E, thence by the northern shore of Bluff Island (Sha Tong Hau Shan) to its eastern extremity, and thence by a straight line drawn to the southernmost point of High Island (Leung Shuen Wan).
