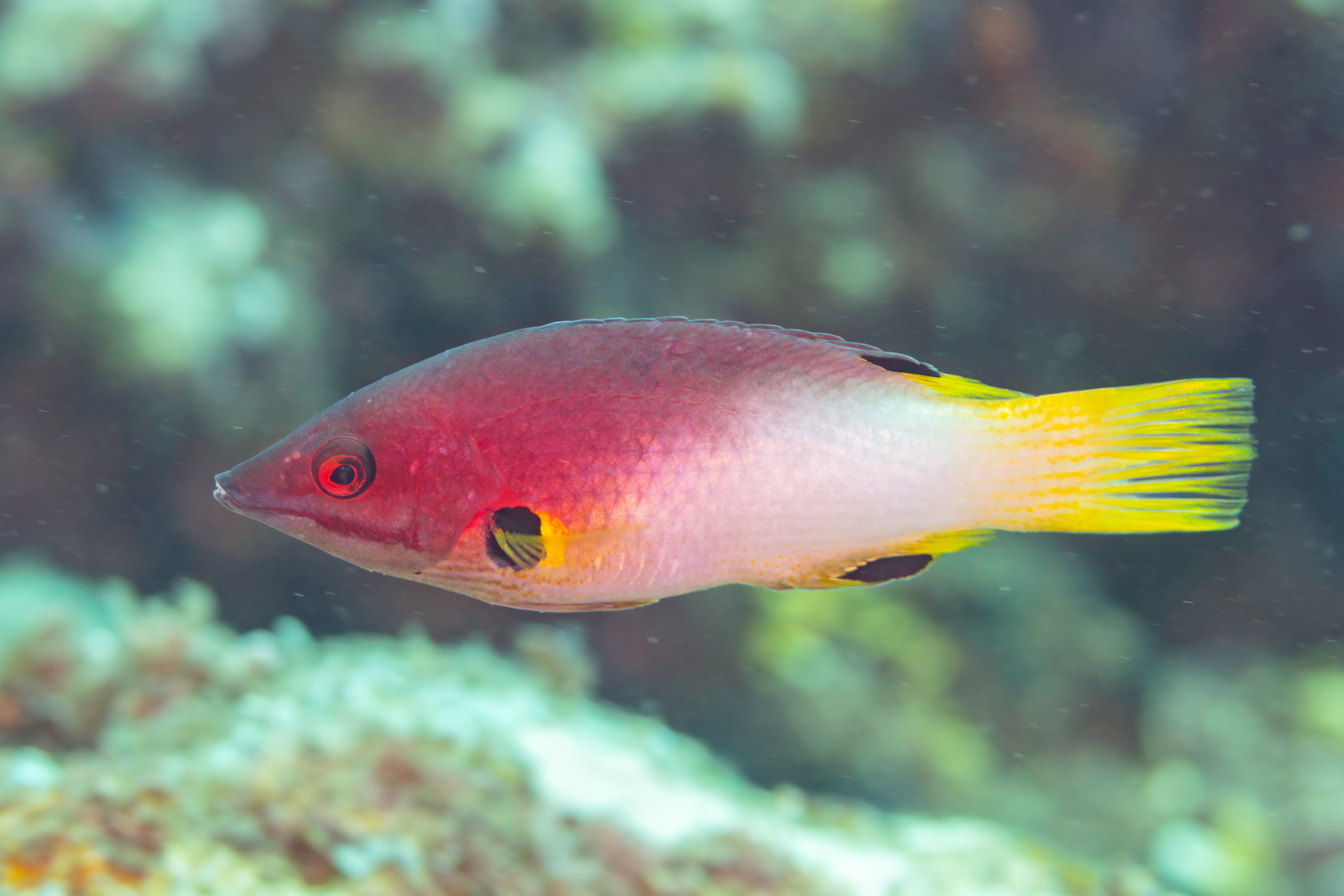
- Bodianus axillaris male in Madagascar
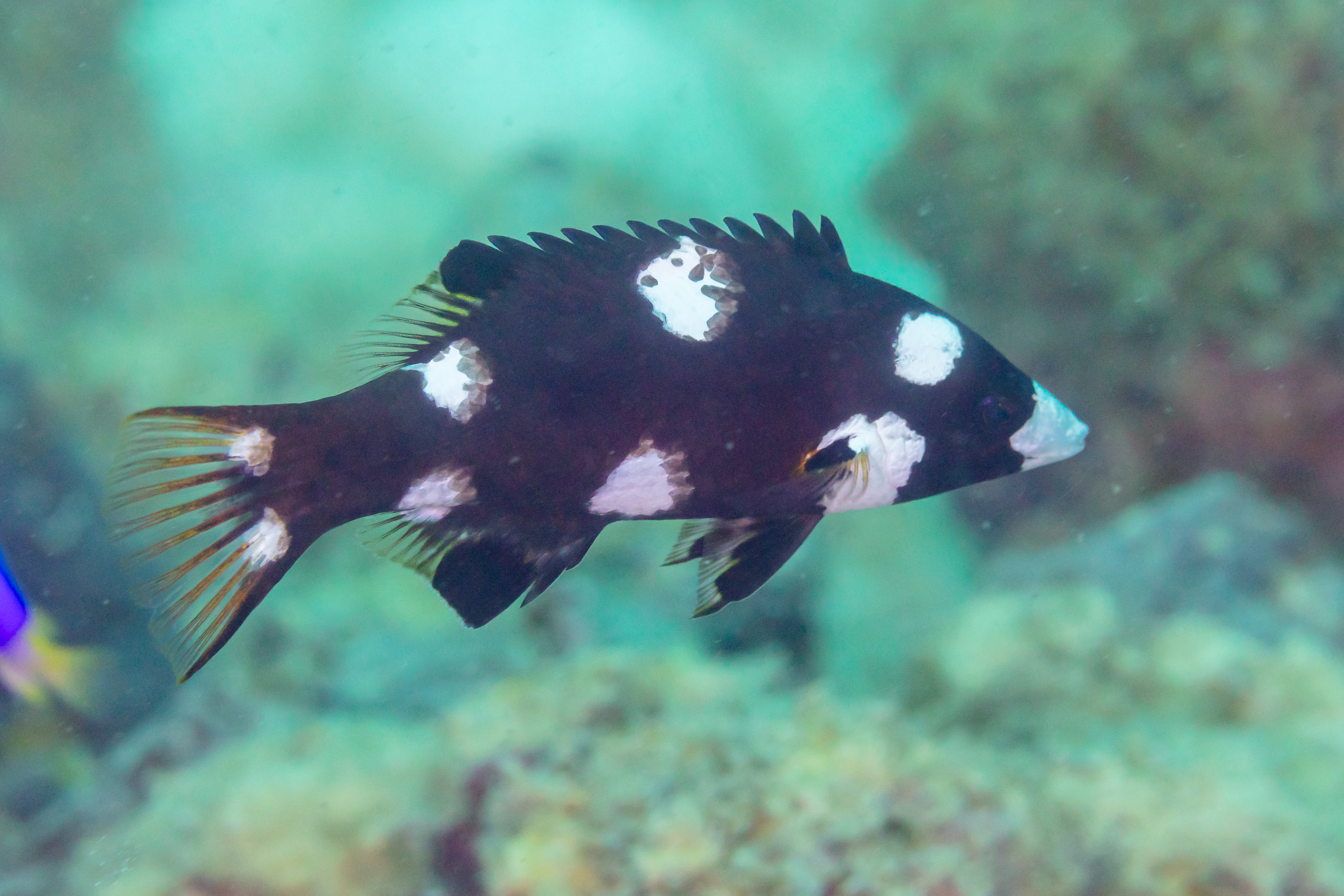
- Female, in the Seychelles

Conservation status
- Least Concern (IUCN 3.1)

Scientific classification
- Kingdom: Animalia
- Phylum: Chordata
- Class: Actinopterygii
- Division: Teleostei
- Order: Labriformes
- Family: Labridae
- Genus: Bodianus
- Species: B. axillaris

Binomial name
- Bodianus axillaris (Bennett, 1832)

Synonyms
- Labrus axillaris Bennett, 1832; Lepidaplois axillaris (Bennett, 1832); Cossyphus octomaculatus Liénard, 1891; Lepidaplois albomaculatus J. L. B. Smith, 1957

= Bodianus axillaris =

Species of wrasse

Bodianus axillaris, the axilspot hogfish, coral pigfish or turncoat hogfish, is a species of wrasse native to the Indo-Pacific.

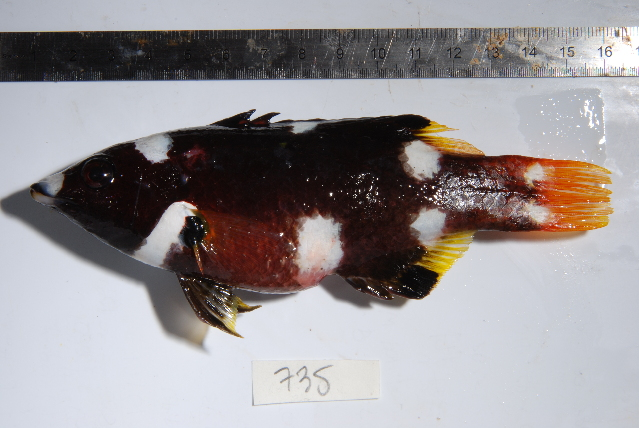
Bodianus axillaris, female

== Description ==
The axilspot hogfish is sexually dimorphic with the adult males being coloured reddish-brown on the front part of their bodies contrasting with the white posterior end and having a sizeable black spot at the base of the pectoral fin, as well as on the dorsal and anal fins. The females and the juveniles are a blackish colour marked with white blotches along the upper and lower flanks. The juveniles of this species resemble those of the split-level hogfish (Bodianus mesothorax) but possess white instead of yellow spots. It grows to a standard length of 20 centimetres (7.9 in).

== Distribution ==
Axilspot hogfish are found in the Indo-Pacific, from the Red Sea to South Africa, Marshall Islands, Marquesan, and Tuamoto Islands, north to Japan.

== Habitat and biology ==
The adults of the axilspot hogfish are found in clear lagoon and along seaward reefs where they are common in clear shallow waters at depths of between 1 and 8 metres (3.3 and 26.2 ft). The larger fish are occasionally found in deeper water below 27 metres (89 ft). The juveniles are found singly in caves or under overhangs where they behave as cleaner fish, adults will sometimes behave in this way too. Their diet is made up of benthic, hard-shelled, invertebrates such as molluscs and crustaceans. It is oviparous and the males and females form distinct pairs when spawning.

== Human use ==
It is infrequently encountered in the aquarium trade, and is not a species of interest to commercial fisheries.

== Species description ==
The axilspot hogfish was formally described by the English zoologist Edward Turner Bennett as Labrus axillaris in 1832 with the type locality being given as Mauritius.

== Bibliography ==
- Bennett, E. T. 1832. Observations on a collection of fishes from the Mauritius, presented by Mr. Telfair, with characters of new genera and species. Proc. Zool. Soc. Lond. 1830-31 (pt 1): 165–169.
- Helfman, G., B. Collette i D. Facey: The diversity of fishes. Blackwell Science, Malden, Massachusetts, United States, 1997.
- Moyle, P. i J. Cech.: Fishes: An Introduction to Ichthyology, 4. ed., Upper Saddle River, New Jersey, United States: Prentice-Hall. Any 2000.
- Nelson, J.: Fishes of the World, 3rd. ed.. New York, United States: John Wiley and Sons. Any 1994.
- Wheeler, A.: The World Encyclopedia of Fishes, 2nd. ed., London: Macdonald. Any 1985.
- Allen, G.R. & R. Swainston. 1988. The Marine Fishes of North-Western Australia. A Field Guide for Anglers and Divers. Western Australian Museum. Pp. 201.
