= Shek Chau, Sai Kung District =

Island in Hong Kong

Coordinates: 22.379923°N 114.299333°E

Shek Chau (Chinese: 石洲; lit. 'stone island') is a small island in the Port Shelter, Hong Kong. It is under the administration of Sai Kung District.

The island has an area of 0.003 km^{2}. It is located off the northwestern coast of the island Yim Tin Tsai.
