= Yim Tin Tsai (Sai Kung District) =

Small offshore island in Hong Kong

Native name: Chinese: 鹽田梓／鹽田仔; lit. 'Little Salt Pan'
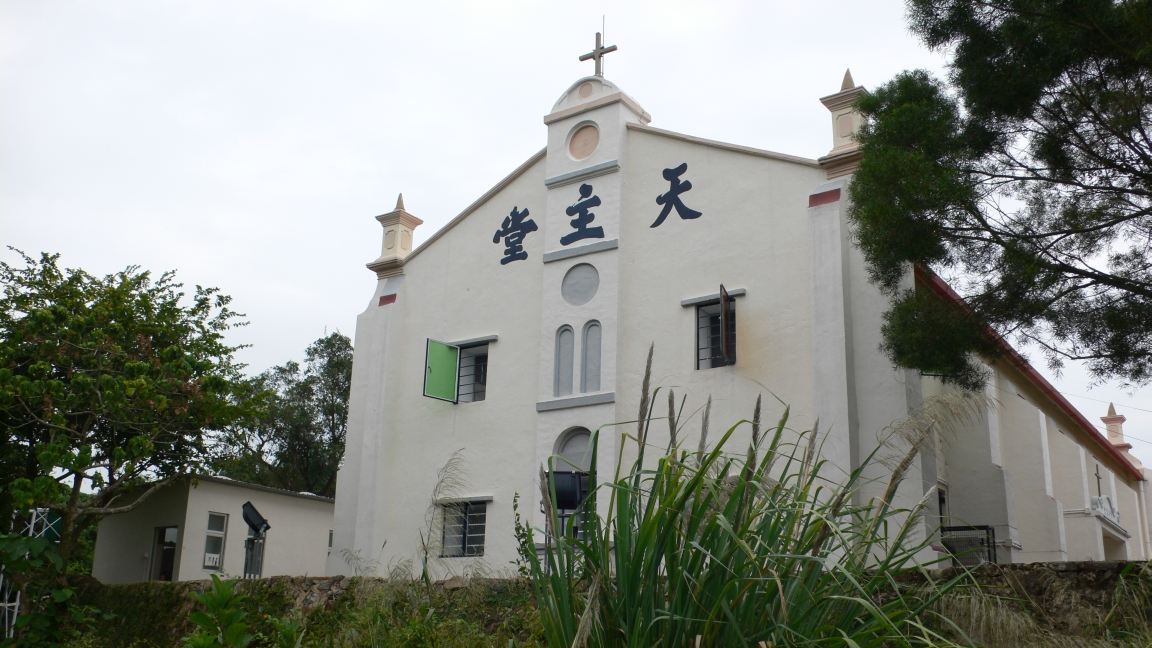
- St. Joseph's Chapel on Yim Tin Tsai

- Location within Hong Kong

Geography
- Location: Port Shelter, Sai Kung District, Hong Kong
- Coordinates: 22.3775°N 114.303174°E

Administration
- Hong Kong SAR

Demographics
- Population: 1+ (2013)

Additional information
- Time zone: HKT (UTC+8:00)

Yim Tin Tsai (or Yim Tin Tze, Chinese: 鹽田梓／鹽田仔; lit. 'Little Salt Pan') is an offshore island in Sai Kung District, Hong Kong. It is also the only salt production location in Hong Kong. The island was once abandoned but became a tourist attraction following conservation efforts.

== Geography ==
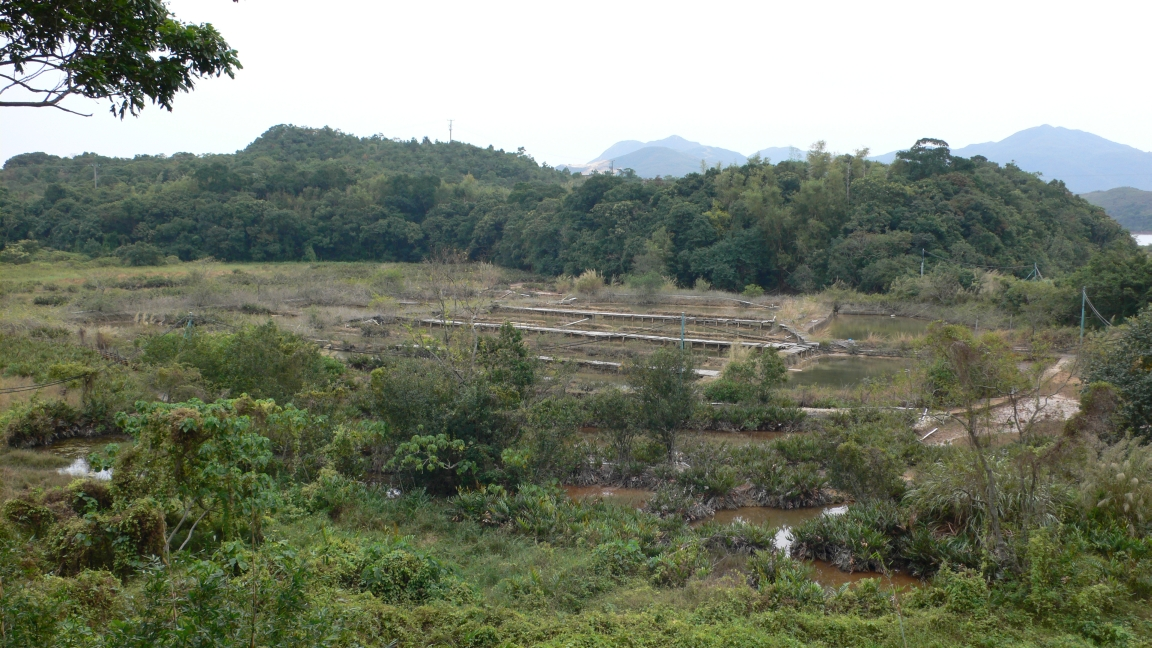
Abandoned salt pan on Yim Tin Tsai (Photo taken in 2006)

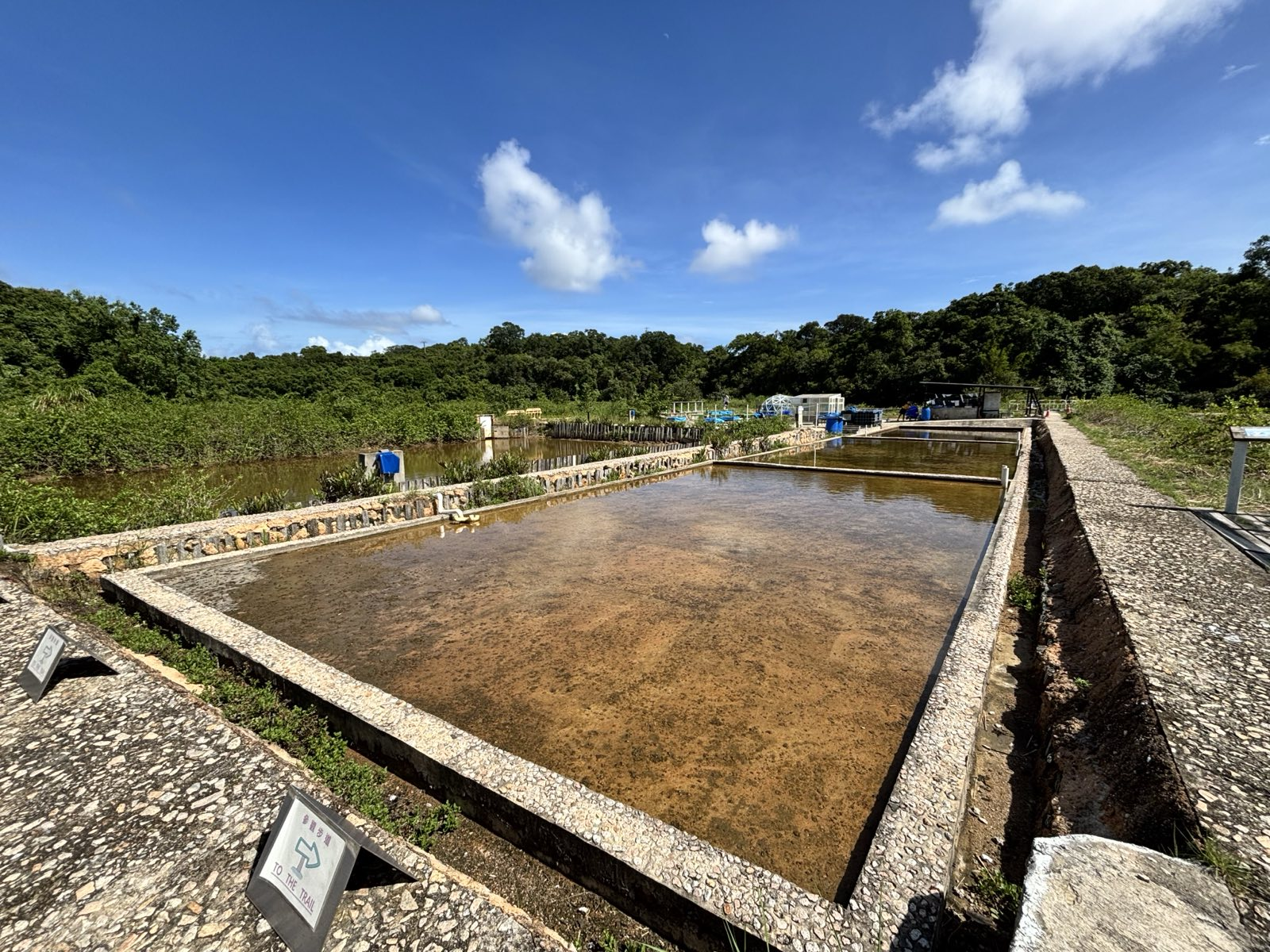
The rebuilt salt pan in Yim Tin Tsai (Photo taken in 2025)

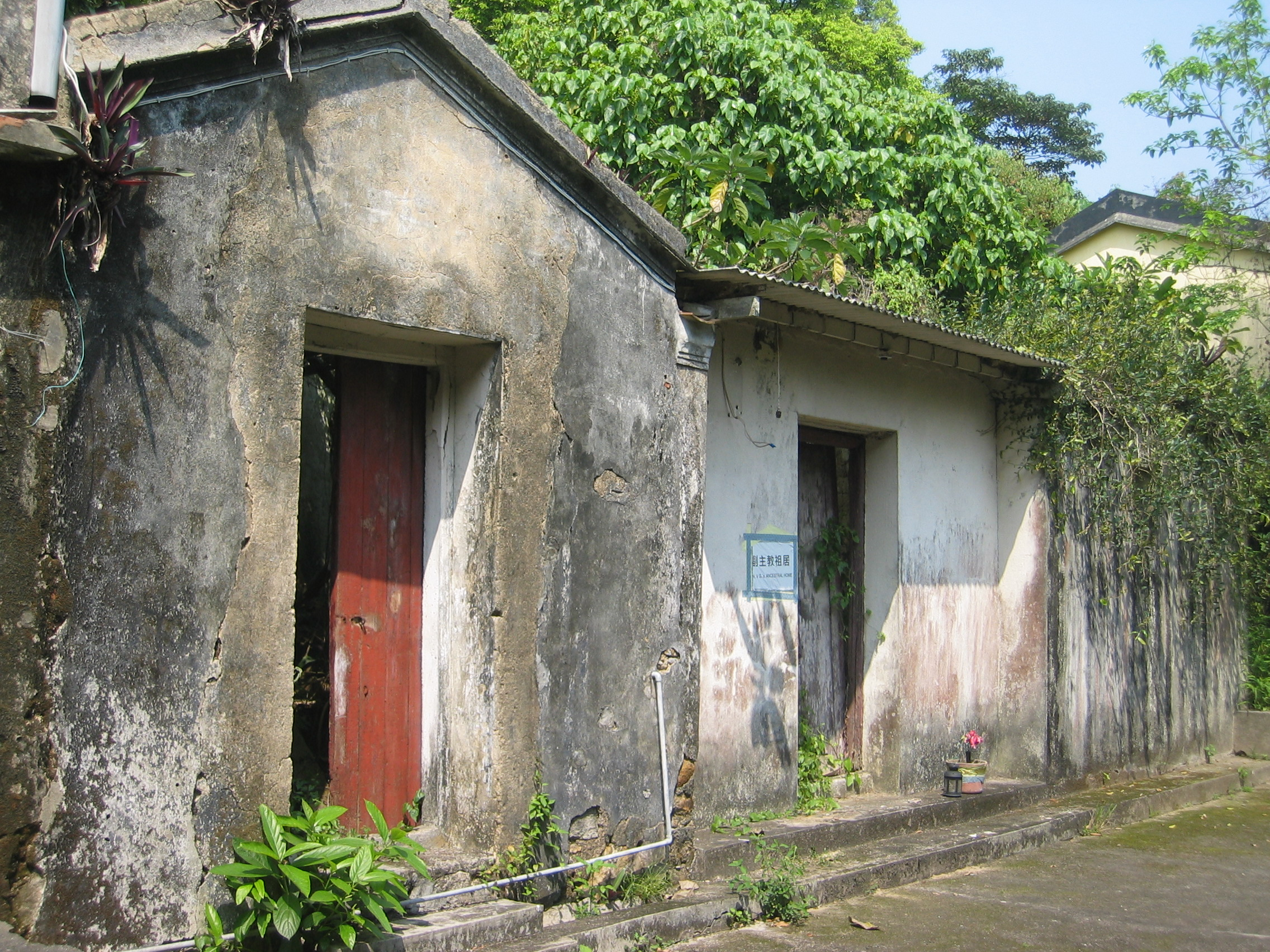
Rev. Dominic Chan Chi-ming's former house on Yim Tin Tze.

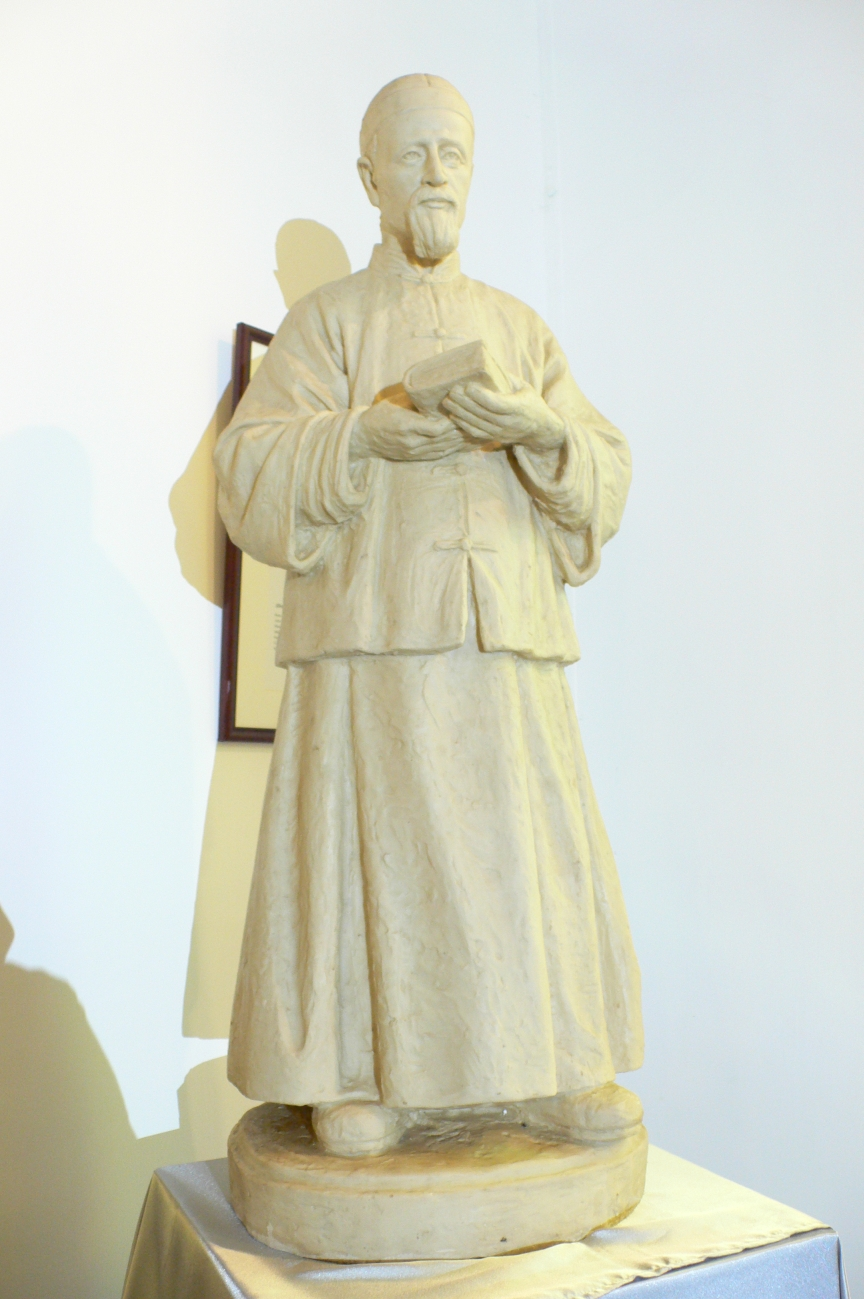
Statue of Joseph Freinademetz in St. Joseph's Chapel.

The island has an area of 24 hectares (49 acres). It is located in Port Shelter, the harbour located south of Sai Kung Peninsula and east of the Sai Kung mainland. It is connected by a breakwater in its southern part to the larger island of Kau Sai Chau.

The smaller islands of Shek Chau and Kwun Cham Wan are located off the coast of Yim Tin Tsai, in the northwest and the southwest respectively.

== Administration ==
Yim Tin Tsai is a recognised village under the New Territories Small House Policy.

== History ==
Archaeological excavation reveals the island dates from the Eastern Han dynasty circa 100 CE. The island was settled by members of the Hakka Chan (陳) clan during the 19th century (other sources mention 300 years ago). The Chans came from Yim Tin (鹽田; pinyin: Yántián), now part of the Yantian District of Shenzhen. The new settlement was called Yim Tin Tsai in its memory. Other members of the clan settled in Yim Tin Tsai in Tai Po and Ping Yeung, in Ta Kwu Ling, North District. At its peak, Yim Tin Tsai had 500 inhabitants.

Villagers lived on farming, fishing and salt-making. They farmed 6 acres (24,000 m^{2}) of salt pan, the smallest of the five salt pans in Hong Kong at the time. Other salt pans were in Tai O, Lantau Island, San Hui and Wong Ka Wai in Tuen Mun, Yim Liu Ha in Sha Tau Kok and Yim Tin Tsai in Tai Po.

Baptism of the island's residents started in 1866, and by 1875, all villagers on the island were baptised. In 1879 a chapel was set up by Joseph Freinademetz (who was canonised in 2003).

In 1890, the St. Joseph's Chapel was inaugurated.

Facing stiff competition from salt producers in Mainland China and Vietnam, salt production on the island dwindled. In the 1920s, there was no sign of salt production on Yim Tin Tsai.

In the 1960s, the island has around 200 residents, all of them are Catholics.

In the early 1970s, the St. Joseph's Chapel became derelict as villagers gradually moved out of the island.

Ching Po School, the village school, closed down in the 1990s owing to a lack of students.

In 1998, the last resident on the island moved out and Yim Tin Tsai became an abandoned island.

In 2011, the committee of Yim Tin Tsai village and Sacred Heart Church Sai Kung established the Salt & Light Preservation Centre, a charity created for the conservation of the village. Villagers and the Catholic Church donated 6 million Hong Kong dollars for the project.

A groundbreaking ceremony was held on 17 March 2013 after the village was given approval to revitalise its abandoned salt pan. Chief Secretary Carrie Lam and then Vicar-General of the Catholic Diocese of Hong Kong Dominic Chan officiated the ceremony.

In 2022, the St. Joseph's Chapel on the island was repaired by the Catholic Diocese of Hong Kong and once again opened to the public.

== Features ==
The current St. Joseph's Chapel replaced the first chapel on Yim Tin Tsai. Built in Italian Romanesque style, it was completed in 1890, with a school adjacent to it. The chapel is a Grade III historic building. It has been renovated three times, the last being in 2004. Cardinal Zen held a special mass in the chapel on 7 May 2006.

The Yim Tin Tsai Typhoon Shelter, established in 1968, is located at the east of the island. It is bordered on the east by the northern part of Kau Sai Chau, and by breakwaters in the north and south.

Mangrove is found off the breakwater linking Yim Tin Tsai and Kau Sai Chau.

The Louisa Landale Campsite, managed by the Hong Kong Girl Guides Association, is located in the southern part of the island.

== Conservation ==
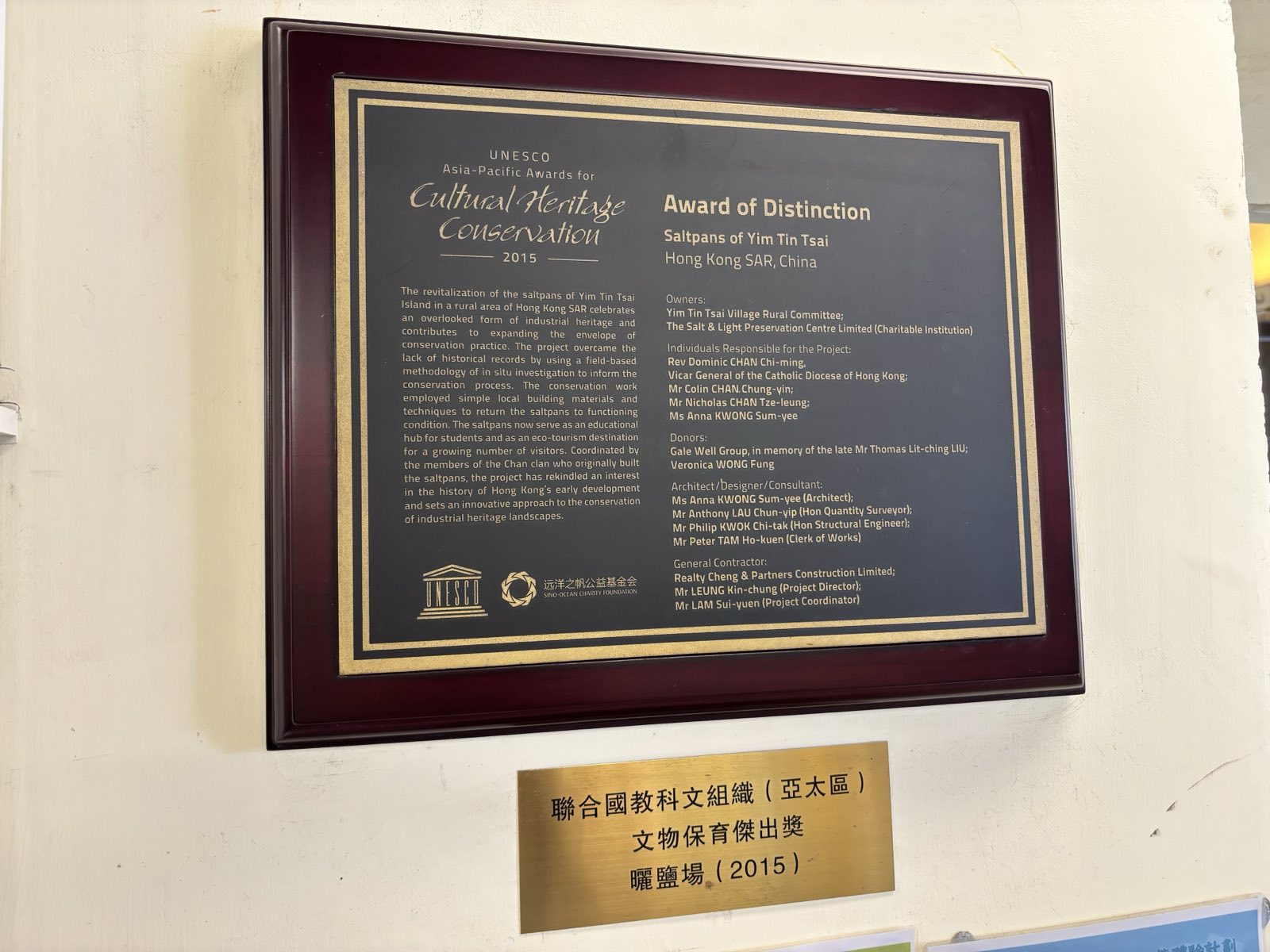
UNESCO Asia Pacific Award 2015 for Yim Tin Tsai

The rehabilitation of the abandoned 1890 St. Joseph's Chapel received an Award of Distinction as part of the 2005 UNESCO Asia-Pacific Heritage Awards.

In 2011, it was rated as a Grade II historical building by the Antiquities Advisory Board.

The revitalisation of the saltpans of Yim Tin Tsai received an Honourable Mention in the UNESCO Asia-Pacific Awards for Cultural Heritage Conservation in 2015.

== Transport ==
Yim Tin Tsai can be reached by private ferry from Sai Kung Town.

== See also ==
- Islands and peninsulas of Hong Kong
