= Lung Ha Wan =

Bay of Hong Kong

Coordinates: 22.309991°N 114.301031°E

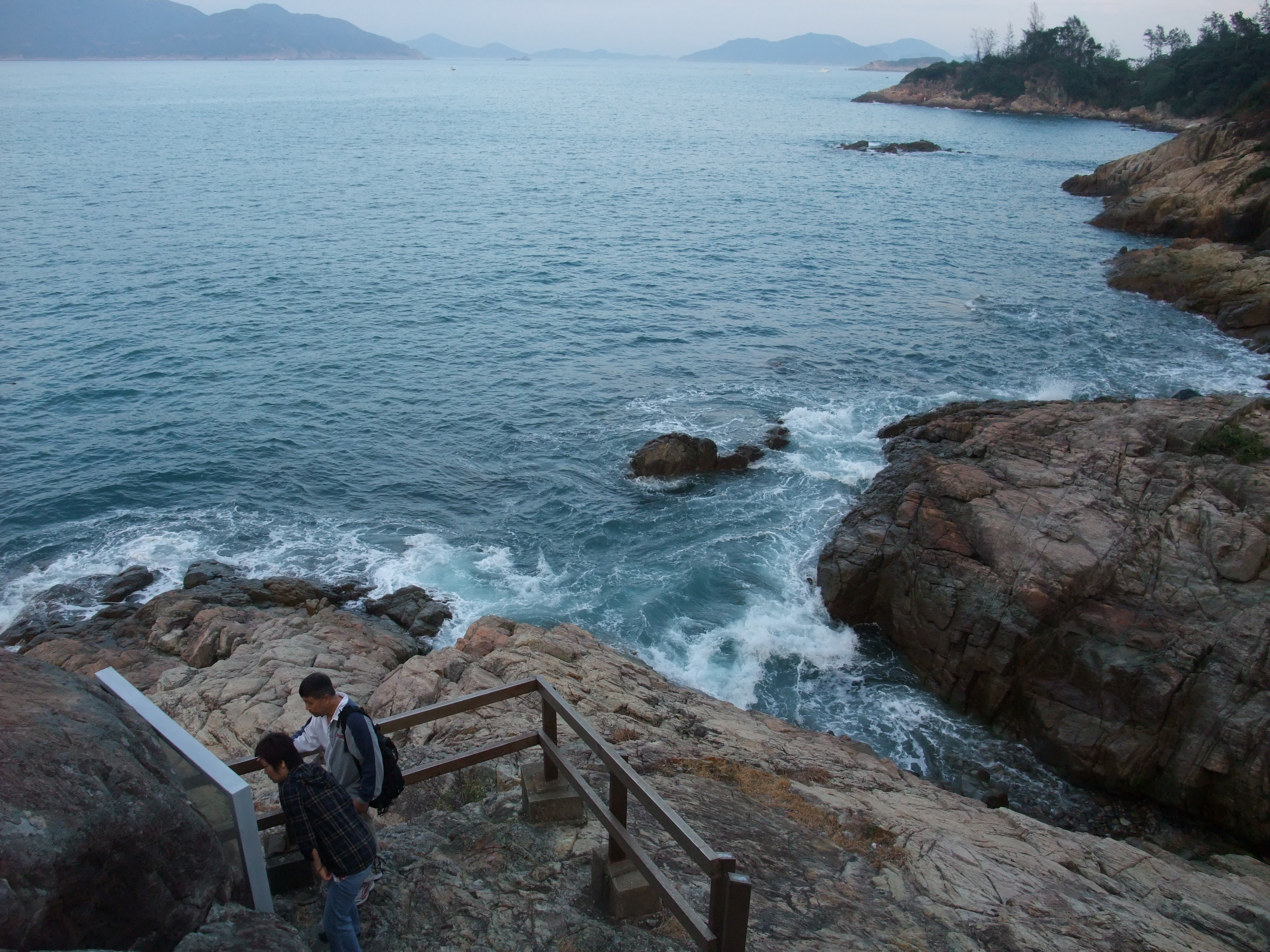
Lung Ha Wan Rock Carving and Lung Ha Wan

Lung Ha Wan (Chinese: 龍蝦灣; Jyutping: lung4 haa1 waan1; Cantonese Yale: lùhng hā wāan; lit. 'Lobster Bay') is a bay at the Clear Water Bay Peninsula in Hong Kong. It is located at the north end of Clear Water Bay Country Park.

The main trail in the country park, Lung Ha Wan Country Trail was named after this bay. The area is also known for having one of the nine rock carvings of Hong Kong listed as declared monuments.
