= Hap Mun Bay Beach =

Beach in Sharp Island, New Territories, Hong Kong

- Beach
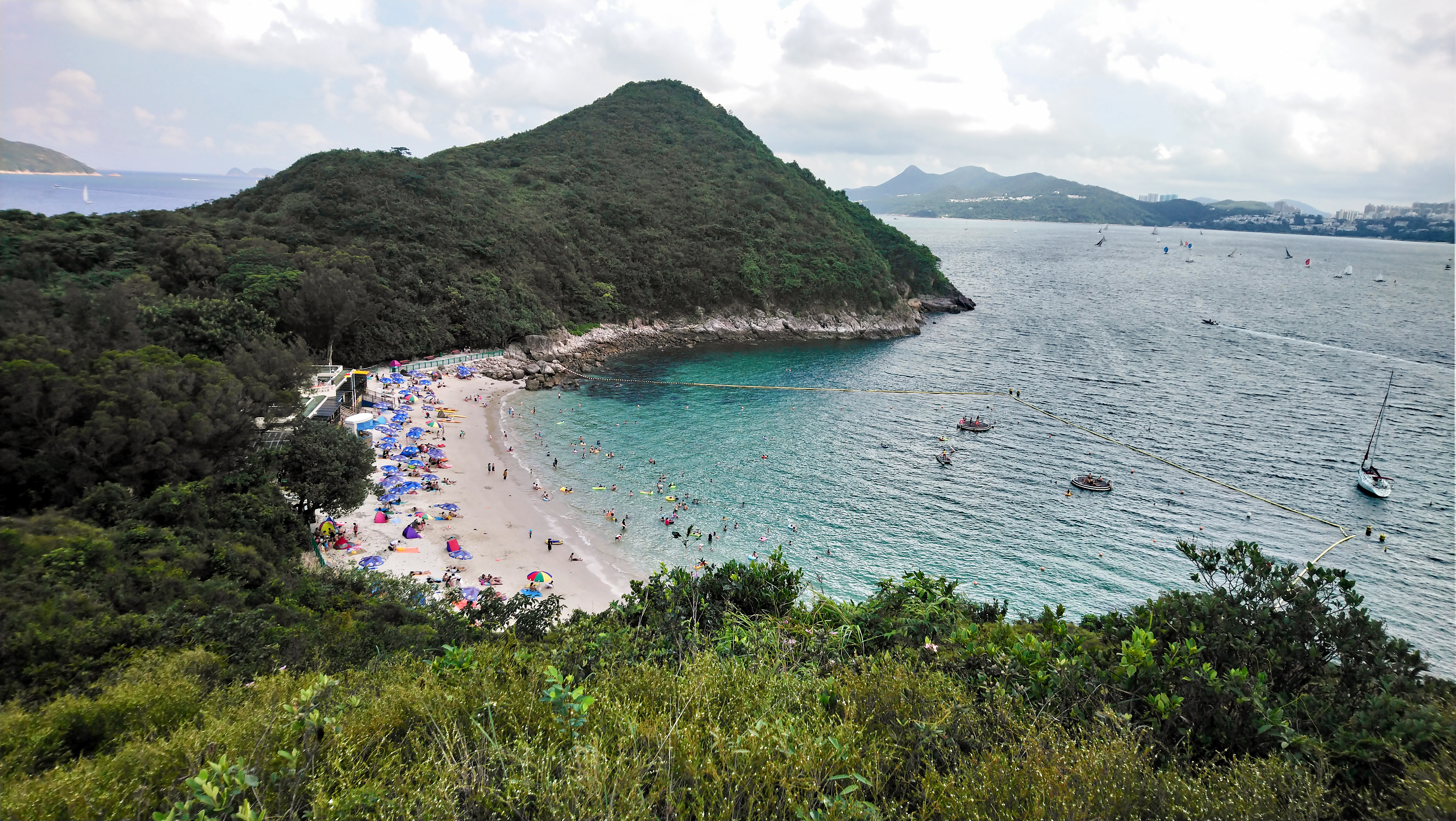
- Hap Mun Bay Beach

- Location within Hong Kong
- Coordinates: 22.35687°N 114.29594°E
- Location: Sharp Island, New Territories

Dimensions
  - Length: 99 m (325 ft)
- Patrolled by: Leisure and Cultural Services Department

Hap Mun Bay Beach
- Traditional Chinese: 廈門灣泳灘
- Simplified Chinese: 厦门湾泳滩
Transcriptions
Standard Mandarin
- Hanyu Pinyin: Xià Mén Wān Yǒng Tān
Yue: Cantonese
- Jyutping: haa6 mun4 waan1 wing6 taan1

Hap Mun Bay Beach or Half Moon Bay Beach is a gazetted beach located facing Hap Mun Bay in the southern side of Sharp Island, Sai Kung District, Hong Kong. The beach has barbecue pits and is managed by the Leisure and Cultural Services Department of the Hong Kong Government. The beach is 99 metres long and is rated as good to fair by the Environmental Protection Department for its water quality in the past twenty years. There are views of Tai Ngam Hau from the beach.

== History ==
On 12 July 2020, a 77-year-old man had drowned while swimming near the beach. He was unconscious when he was rescued by a lifeguard and returned to Sai Kung town centre by kai-to. He was then taken to Tseung Kwan O Hospital where he was pronounced dead.

== Usage ==
The beach offers clear water, silvery sand and is surrounded by wooded hills, making it a popular holiday destination. The beach is also accessible by kai-to from Sai Kung Public Pier.

== Features ==
The beach has the following features:

- BBQ pits (22 nos.)
- Changing rooms
- Showers
- Toilets
- Refreshment kiosk
- Water sports centre

== See also ==
- Beaches of Hong Kong
