= Sharp Island =

Island of Hong Kong

橋咀洲
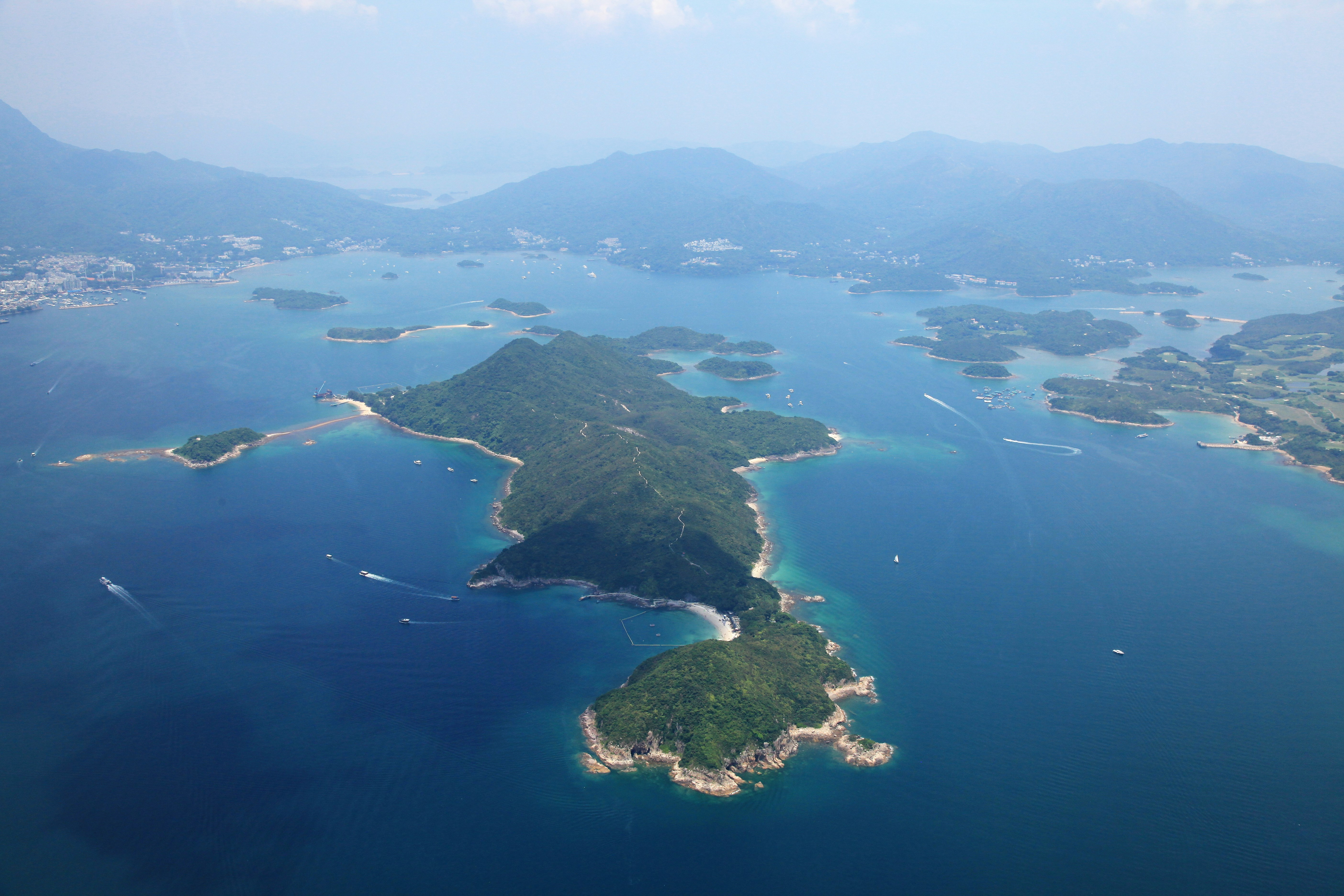
- Sharp Island in 2017
- Interactive map of Sharp Island

Geography
- Location: Port Shelter, Sai Kung District, New Territories, Hong Kong
- Coordinates: 22°21′38.56″N 114°17′42.83″E

Administration
- Hong Kong
- District: Sai Kung District

Sharp Island
- Traditional Chinese: 橋咀洲
- Simplified Chinese: 桥咀洲
Transcriptions
Standard Mandarin
- Hanyu Pinyin: Qiáo jǔ zhōu
Yue: Cantonese
- Yale Romanization: Kìuh jéui jāu
- Jyutping: Kiu4 zeoi2 zau1

Alternative Chinese name
- Traditional Chinese: 橋咀島
- Simplified Chinese: 桥咀岛
Transcriptions
Standard Mandarin
- Hanyu Pinyin: Qiáo jǔ dǎo
Yue: Cantonese
- Yale Romanization: Kìuh jéui dóu
- Jyutping: Kiu4 zeoi2 dou2

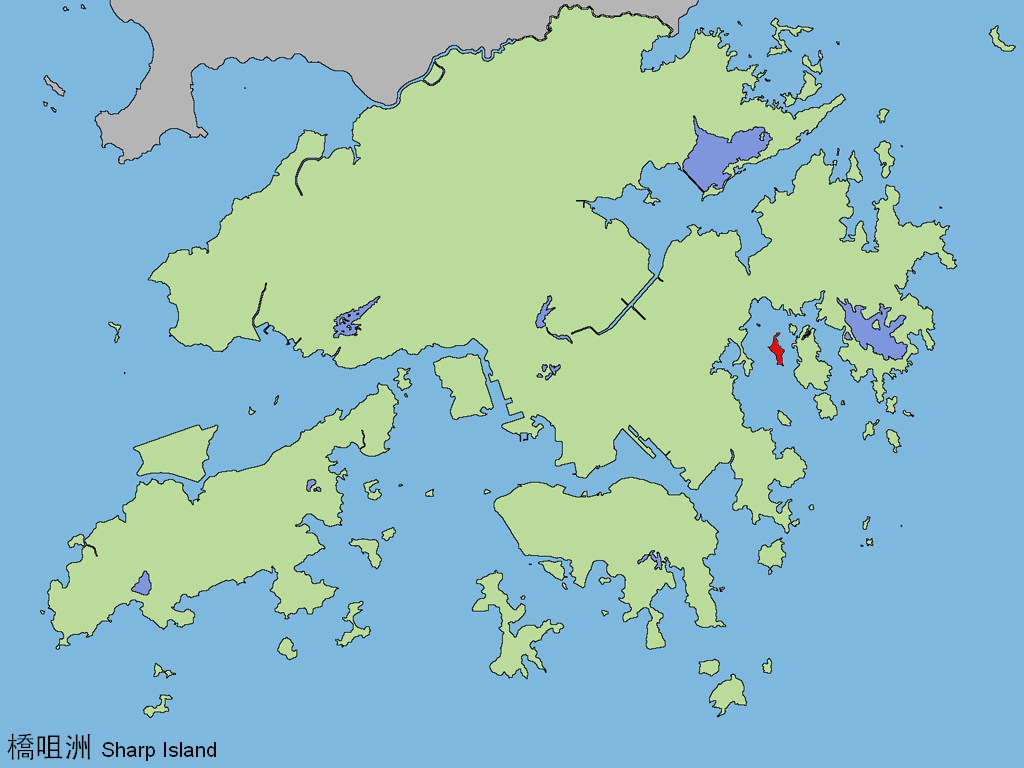
Location of Sharp Island within Hong Kong

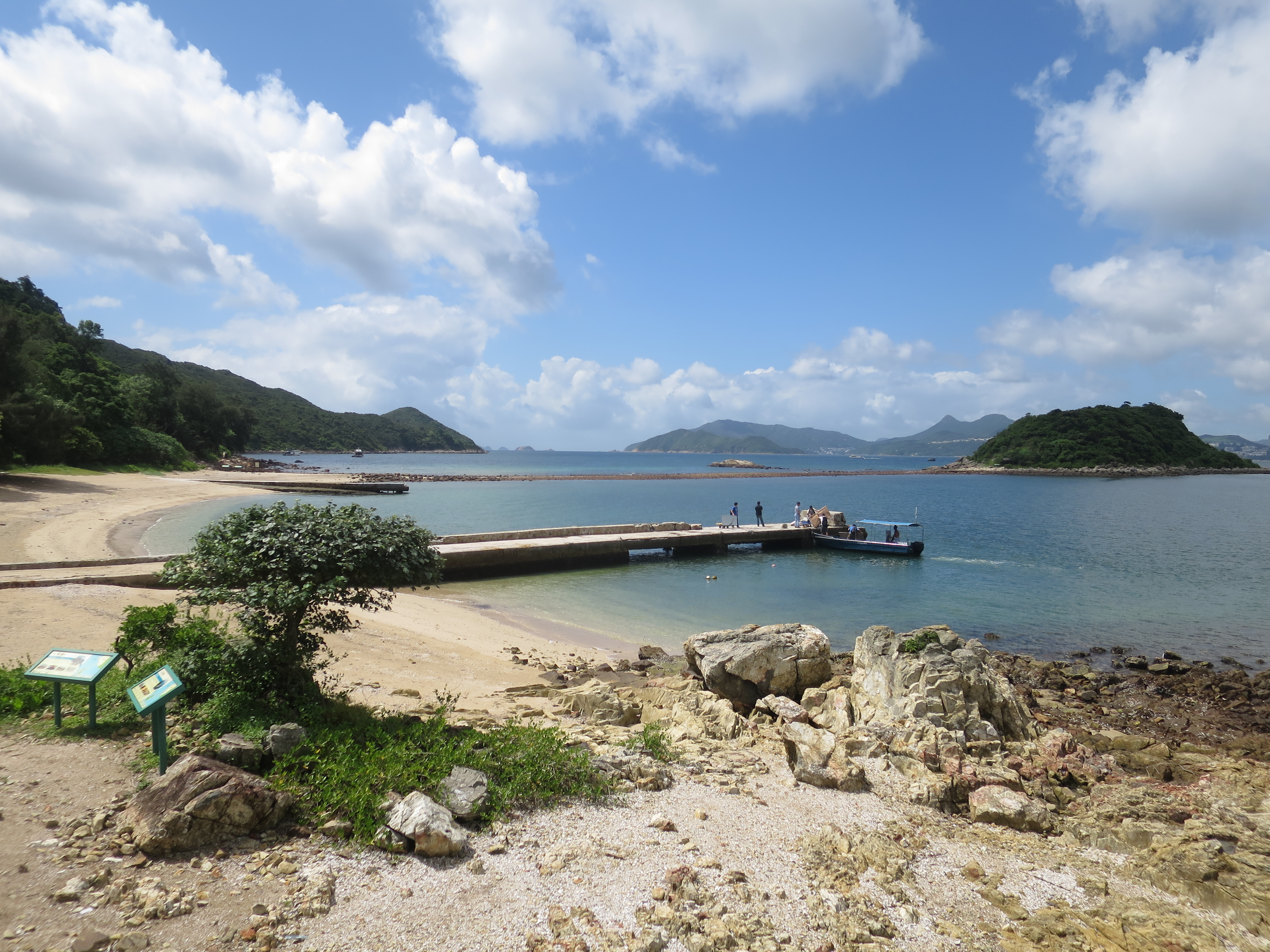
Kiu Tau connected by tombolo. The rocks in the foreground are part of Sharp Island Special Area

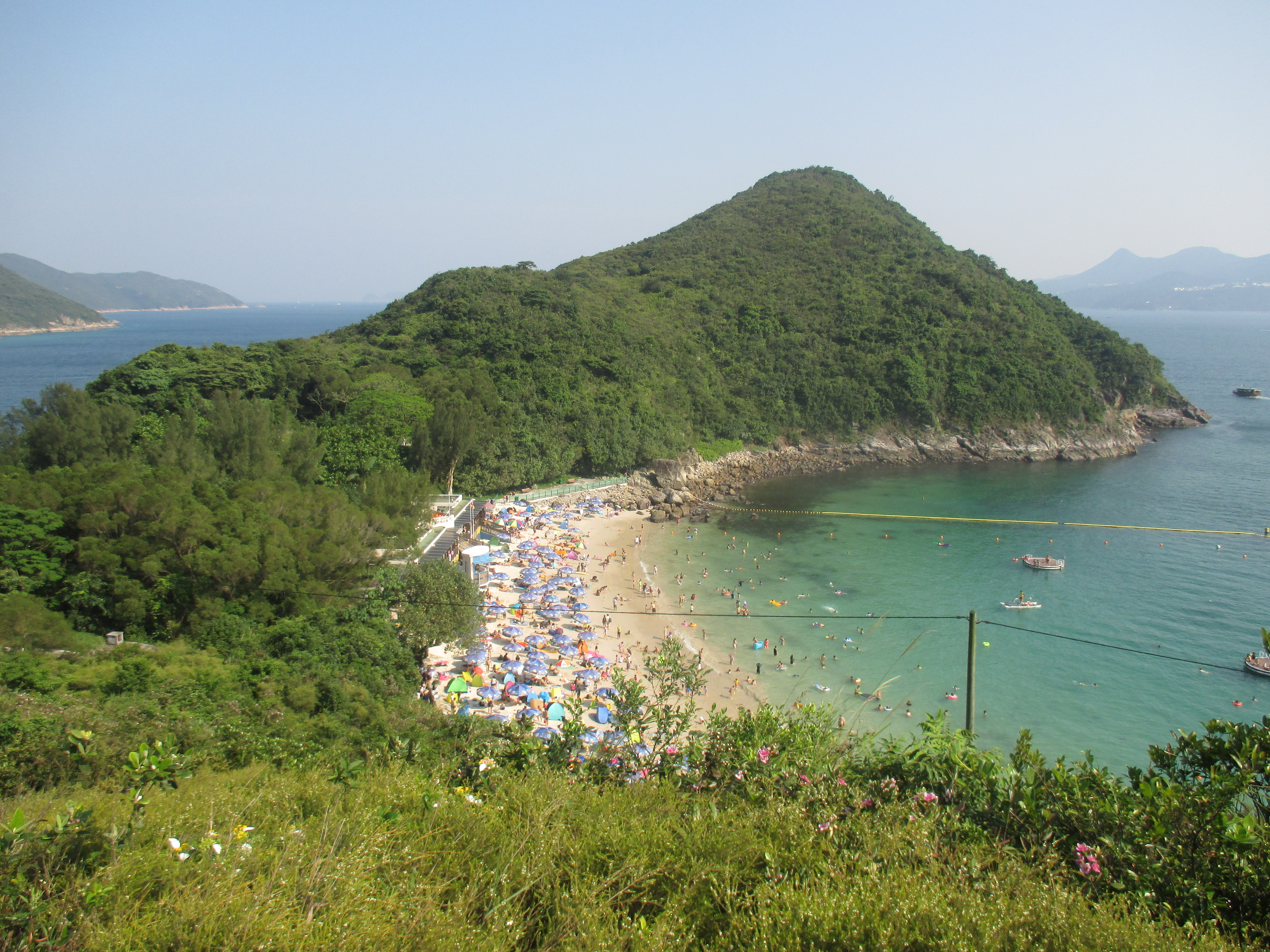
Beach at Half Moon Bay

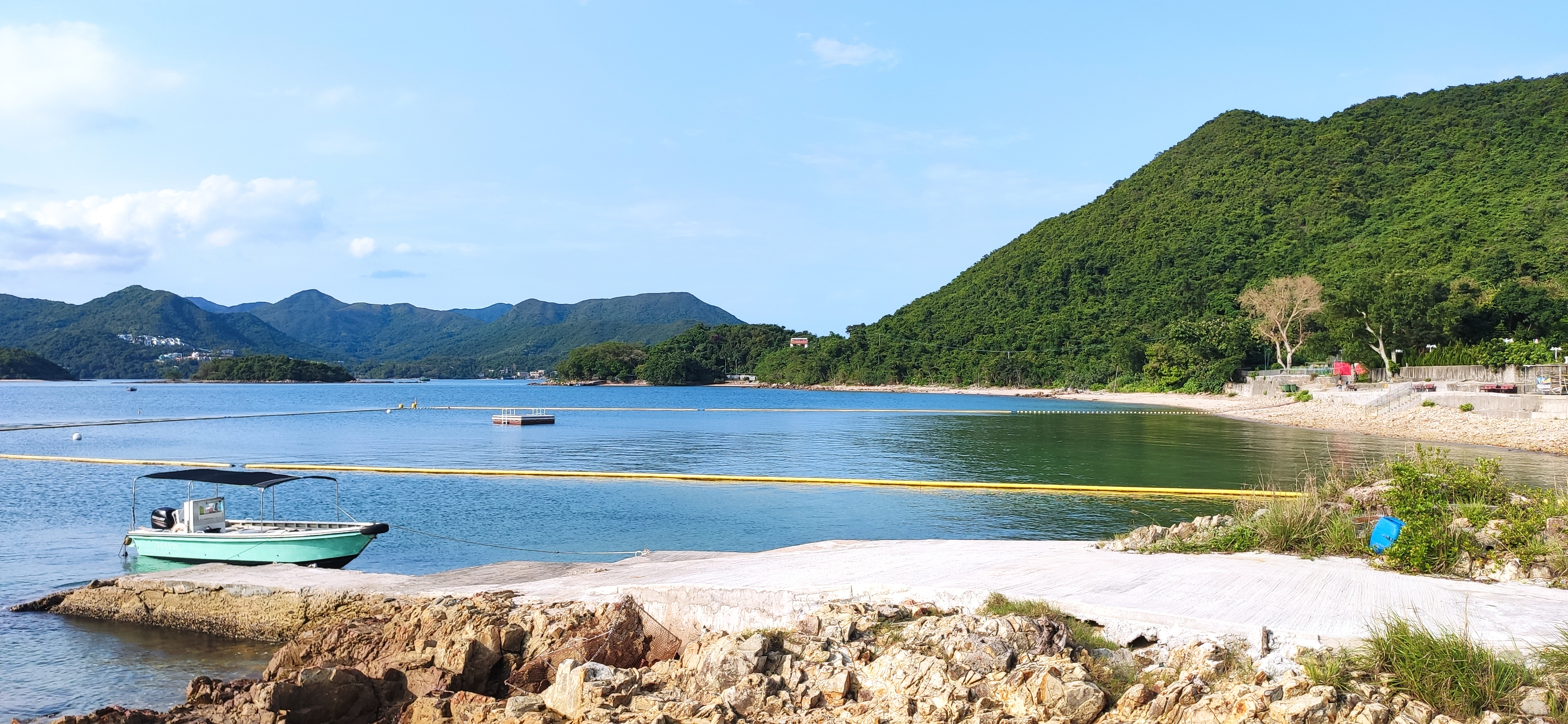
Kiu Tsui Beach

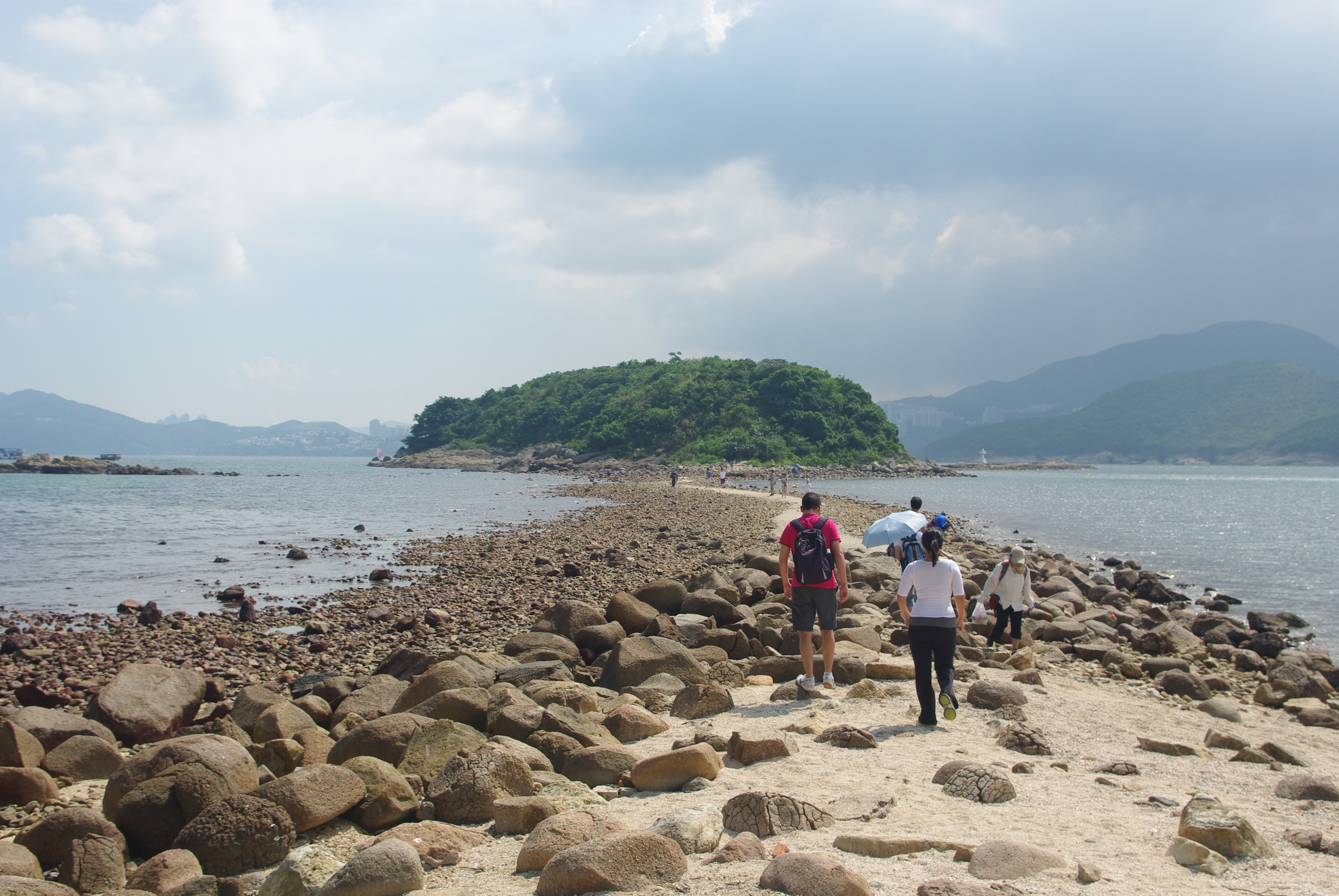
Tombolo leading to Kiu Tau.

Sharp Island or Kiu Tsui Chau (Chinese: 橋咀洲) is the largest island in the Kiu Tsui Country Park located at Port Shelter of Sai Kung, Hong Kong. The area is most known for fishing, swimming as well as diving. Sharp Island is under the administration of Sai Kung District.

== Geography ==
The island has a maximum elevation of 136m and an area of 1 km^{2}. The two beaches, Half Moon Bay Beach (廈門灣泳灘, also known as Hap Mun Bay), and Kiu Tsui Beach (橋咀泳灘) are located on the island. Both are managed by the Hong Kong Leisure and Cultural Services Department.

When the predicted tides at Ko Lau Wan is lower than or equal to +1.40 meters, visitors are able to visit Kiu Tau (橋頭), an inshore islet, on foot.

Different kind of volcanic rocks can be found on Sharp Island. The most frequent ones are rocks with a peculiar pattern on the surface. Other rocks have an unusual pineapple-shaped form.

== History ==
=== Origin of the different kinds or rocks ===
It is believed that about 140 million years ago a volcano was located in Sai Kung. Sharp Island was on the margin of the caldera. This is probably the reason for the widely distributed different volcanic rocks from different geological periods around Sharp Island.

=== Formation of the tombolo ===
The sea currents near Sharp Island pushed sand and gravel near the shore. After several years they formed a tombolo, a natural bridge made of different sized rocks and sand – connecting Sharp Island and Kiu Tau (橋頭). At high tide the tombolo is submerged in water and thus can only be seen when the tide goes out.

== Biodiversity ==
There are over 70% of stony corals coverage around the island. An endangered flora Tetrathyrium subcordatum is found on the south of the island.

== Conservation ==
A small portion of Sharp Island is designated as the Sharp Island Special Area (橋咀洲特別地區). It covers 649 square metres and was designated in 2011. The area is located west of the pier at Kui Tsui Beach. The geology of the area is characterised by volcanic rocks of the Cretaceous period.

== Transportation ==
Sharp Island is accessible by Kai-to from Sai Kung Town.

== See also ==
- Hong Kong UNESCO Global Geopark
- List of islands and peninsulas of Hong Kong
