= List of planning areas in Hong Kong =

This is a list of planning areas in Hong Kong.

== Hong Kong Planning Areas (HPA) ==
- Kennedy Town and Mount Davis (HPA 1)
- Sai Ying Pun and Sheung Wan (HPA 3)
- Central District (HPA 4)
- Wan Chai (HPA 5)
- Causeway Bay (HPA 6)
- Wong Nai Chung (HPA 7)
- North Point (HPA 8)
- Shau Kei Wan (HPA 9)
- Pok Fu Lam (HPA 10)
- Mid-Levels West (HPA 11)
- Mid-Levels East (HPA 12)
- Jardine's Lookout and Wong Nai Chung Gap (HPA 13)
- The Peak Area (HPA 14)
- Aberdeen and Ap Lei Chau (HPA 15 and 16)
- Shouson Hill and Repulse Bay (HPA 17, Violet Hill not in outline zoning plan)
- Tai Tam and Shek O (HPA 18)
- Stanley (HPA 19)
- Chai Wan (HPA 20)
- Quarry Bay (HPA 21)
- (Mount Butler) (HPA 23, not in outline zoning plan)
- Central District (Extension) (HPA 24)
- Wan Chai North (HPA 25)

== Kowloon Planning Areas (KPA) ==
- Tsim Sha Tsui (KPA 1)
- Yau Ma Tei (KPA 2)
- Mong Kok (KPA 3)
- Shek Kip Mei (KPA 4)
- Cheung Sha Wan (KPA 5)
- Ho Man Tin (KPA 6 and 7)
- Wang Tau Hom and Tung Tau (東頭) (KPA 8)
- Hung Hom (KPA 9)
- Ma Tau Kok (KPA 10)
- Tsz Wan Shan, Diamond Hill and San Po Kong (KPA 11)
- Ngau Chi Wan (KPA 12)
- Ngau Tau Kok and Kowloon Bay (KPA 13 and 17)
- Kwun Tong North (KPA 14N)
- Kwun Tong South (KPA 14S)
- Cha Kwo Ling, Yau Tong and Lei Yue Mun (KPA 15)
- Lai Chi Kok (KPA 16)
- Kowloon Tong (KPA 18)
- South West Kowloon (西南九龍) (KPA 20)
- Kai Tak (KPA 22)

Note: Although Stonecutters Island is within Kowloon, it belongs to New Territories planning areas.

== New Territories ==
- Tsuen Wan (TW)
- Tsuen Wan West (TWW)
- Kwai Chung (KC)
- Tsing Yi (TY)
- Stonecutters Island (SC)
- Tuen Mun (TM)
- Yuen Long (YL)
- Tin Shui Wai (TSW)
- Sha Tin (ST)
- Ma On Shan (MOS)
- Pak Shek Kok (白石角) (East) (PSK)
- Tai Po (TP)
- Fanling / Sheung Shui (FSS)
- Tseung Kwan O (TKO)
- South Lantau Coast (SLC)
- So Kwun Wat (TM-SKW)
- Lam Tei and Yick Yuen (奕園) (TM-LTYY)
- Ping Shan (YL-PS)
- Tong Yan San Tsuen (唐人新村) (YL-TYST)
- Ha Tsuen (廈村 (YL-HT)
- Sheung Pak Nai (上白泥) and Ha Pak Nai (下白泥) (YL-PN)
- Lau Fau Shan and Tsim Bei Tsui (尖鼻咀) (YL-LFS)
- Tai Tong (大棠) (YL-TT)
- Nam Sang Wai (南生圍) (YL-NSW)
- Mai Po and Fairview Park(YL-MP)
- Kam Tin South (YL-KTS)
- Kam Tin North (YL-KTN)
- Shek Kong (YL-SK)
- Pat Heung (YL-PH)
- Ngau Tam Mei (牛潭尾) (YL-NTM)
- San Tin (YL-ST)
- Kwu Tung (古洞) North (NE-KTN)
- Kwu Tung South (NE-KTS)
- Ping Kong (丙崗) (NE-PK)
- Fu Tei Au (虎地坳) and Sha Ling (NE-FTA)
- Hung Lung Hang (恐龍坑) (NE-HLH)
- Ping Che (坪輋) and Ta Kwu Ling (打鼓嶺) (NE-TKL)
- Wo Keng Shan (禾徑山) (NE-WKS)
- Luk Keng (鹿頸) and Wo Hang (禾坑) (NE-LK)
- Man Uk Pin (萬屋邊) (NE-MUP)
- Hok Tau (鶴藪) (NE-HT)
- Lung Yeuk Tau (龍躍頭) and Kwan Tei (軍地) South (NE-LYT)
- Kau Lung Hang (九龍坑) (NE-KLH)
- Lam Tsuen (NE-LT)
- Sha Lo Tung (沙羅洞) (NE-SLT)
- Ting Kok (汀角) (NE-TK)
- Wu Kau Tang (烏蛟騰) (NE-WKT)
- Shap Sze Heung (NE-SSH)
- Tai Mong Tsai (大網仔) and Tsam Chuk Wan (斬竹灣) (SK-TMT)
- Tai Long Wan (大浪灣) (SK-TLW)
- Pak Kong (北港) and Sha Kok Mei (沙角尾) (SK-PK)
- Sai Kung Town (SK-SKT)
- Hebe Haven (白沙灣) (SK-HH)
- Ho Chung (蠔涌) (SK-HC)
- Kwun Yam Shan (觀音山) and Fa Sam Hang (花心坑) (ST-KYS)
- Tseng Lan Shue (井欄樹) (SK-TLS)
- Clear Water Bay Peninsula North (SK-CWBN)
- Clear Water Bay Peninsula South (SK-CWBS)
- Tung A and Pak A (under Development Permission Area Plans)
- Sham Chung (深涌) (under Development Permission Area Plans)
- Pak Lap (under Development Permission Area Plans)
- Tai Long Sai Wan (under Development Permission Area Plans)
- Chek Keng (under Development Permission Area Plans)
- Hoi Ha (under Development Permission Area Plans)
- Ko Lau Wan (under Development Permission Area Plans)
- Lai Chi Wo, Siu Tan and Sam A Tsuen (under Development Permission Area Plans)
- Lin Ma Hang (under Development Permission Area Plans)
- Man Kam To (under Development Permission Area Plans)
- Ma Tso Lung and Hoo Hok Wai (under Development Permission Area Plans)
- So Lo Pun (under Development Permission Area Plans)
- Sha Tau Lok (under Development Permission Area Plans)
- Ta Kwu Ling North (under Development Permission Area Plans)
- To Kwa Peng and Pak Tam Au (under Development Permission Area Plans)
- Yung Shue O (under Development Permission Area Plans)
- Yim Tin Tsai and Ma Shi Chau (under Development Permission Area Plans)
- Mau Ping (under Development Permission Area Plans)
- Tin Fu Tsai (under Development Permission Area Plans)

== Islands ==
- Tung Chung Town Centre Area (I-TCTC)
- North-East Lantau (I-NEL)
- Ma Wan (I-MWI)
- Chek Lap Kok (I-CLK)
- Discovery Bay (I-DB)
- Lamma Island (I-LI)
- Peng Chau (I-PC)
- Cheung Chau (I-CC)
- Luk Wu and Keung Shan (under Development Permission Area Plans)
- Po Toi Islands (under Development Permission Area Plans)
- Tai O Fringe (under Development Permission Area Plans)
- Mui Wo Fringe (I-MWF)
- Ngong Ping (I-NP)
