= Ngau Liu =

Ngau Liu (Chinese: 牛寮) is the name of several places in Hong Kong:

- Ngau Liu (near Sha Kok Mei), near Sha Kok Mei in Sai Kung District
- Ngau Liu (near Tai Lam Wu), near Tai Lam Wu in Sai Kung District
