= Mui Tsz Lam =

Mui Tsz Lam (Chinese: 梅子林) is the name of several villages in Hong Kong:

- Mui Tsz Lam (North District), in North District
- Mui Tsz Lam (Sha Tin District), in Sha Tin District
