= Chuk Yuen (Sai Kung District) =

Village in Sai Kung District, Hong Kong

Coordinates: 22.3551286°N 114.2356938°E

Chuk Yuen (Chinese: 竹園) is a village in Sai Kung District, Hong Kong.

== Administration ==
Chuk Yuen is a recognized village under the New Territories Small House Policy.

== History ==
Chuk Yuen, together with Man Wo, of which it is considered to be an off-shoot, was part of the inter-village grouping, the Ho Chung Tung (蠔涌洞) or Ho Chung Seven Villages (蠔涌七鄉), which had its centre in Ho Chung.

At the time of the 1911 census, the population of Chuk Yuen was 9. The number of males was 3.
