= Pak Kong Au =

Coordinates: 22.38241°N 114.263527°E

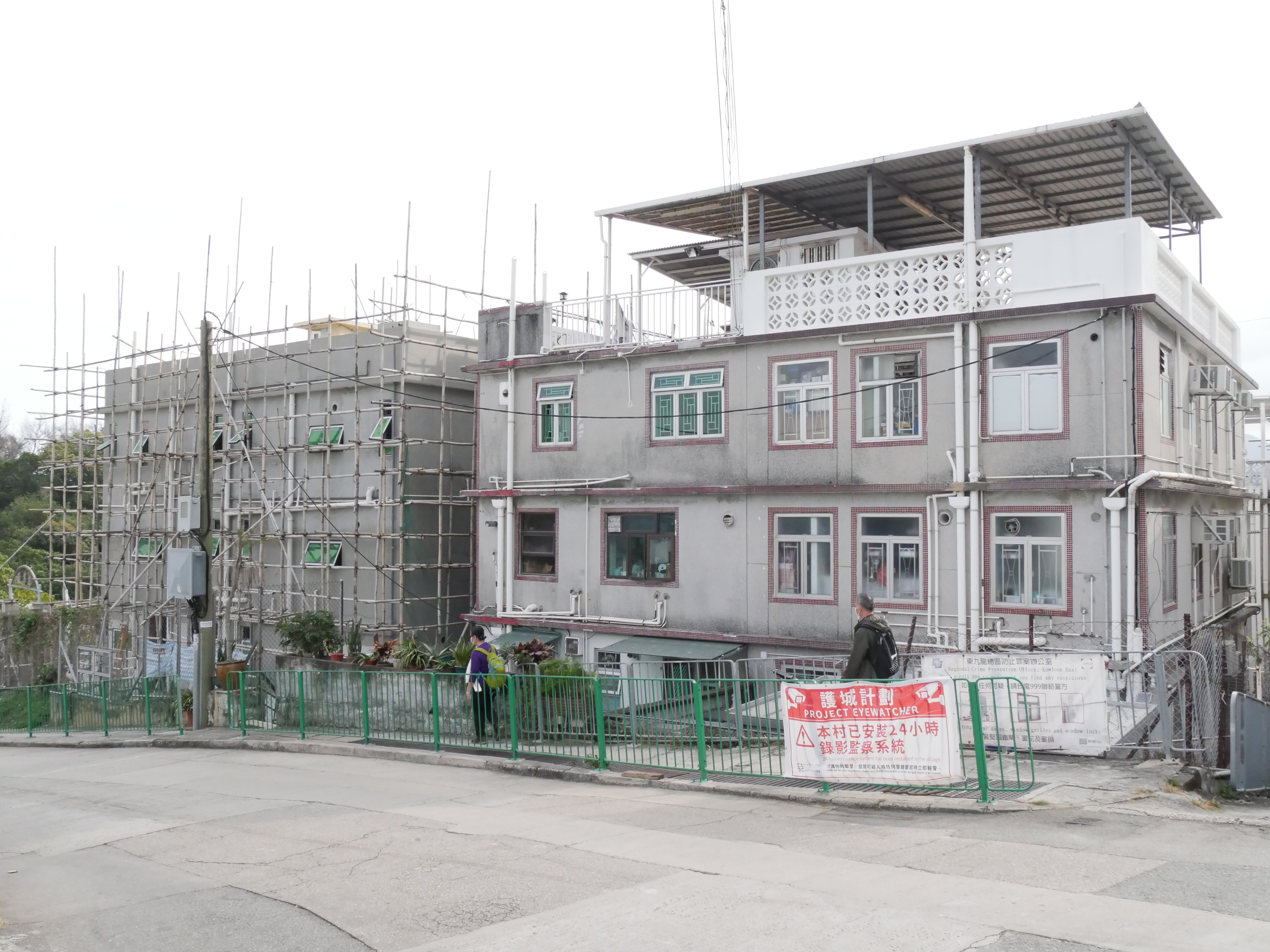
Pak Kong Au

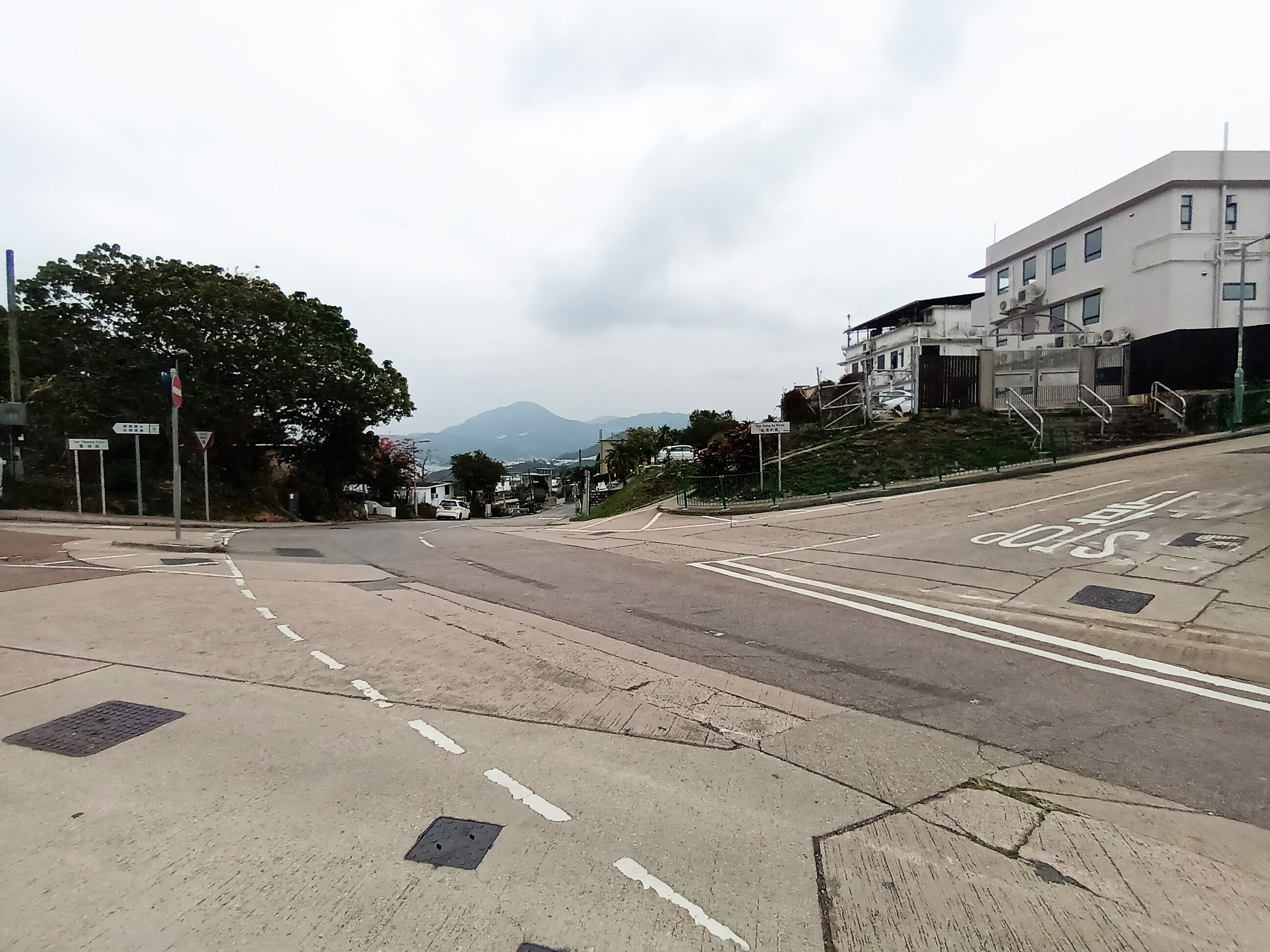
Junction of Po Lo Che Road (菠蘿輋路) and Pak Kong Au Road at Pak Kong Au.

Pak Kong Au (Chinese: 北港㘭) is a village in Sai Kung District, Hong Kong.

Nearby villages include Mau Ping New Village, Pak Kong and Wong Chuk Shan New Village.

== Administration ==
Pak Kong Au is a recognized village under the New Territories Small House Policy.
