= Mau Ping New Village =

Village in Hong Kong

Coordinates: 22.385607°N 114.26153°E

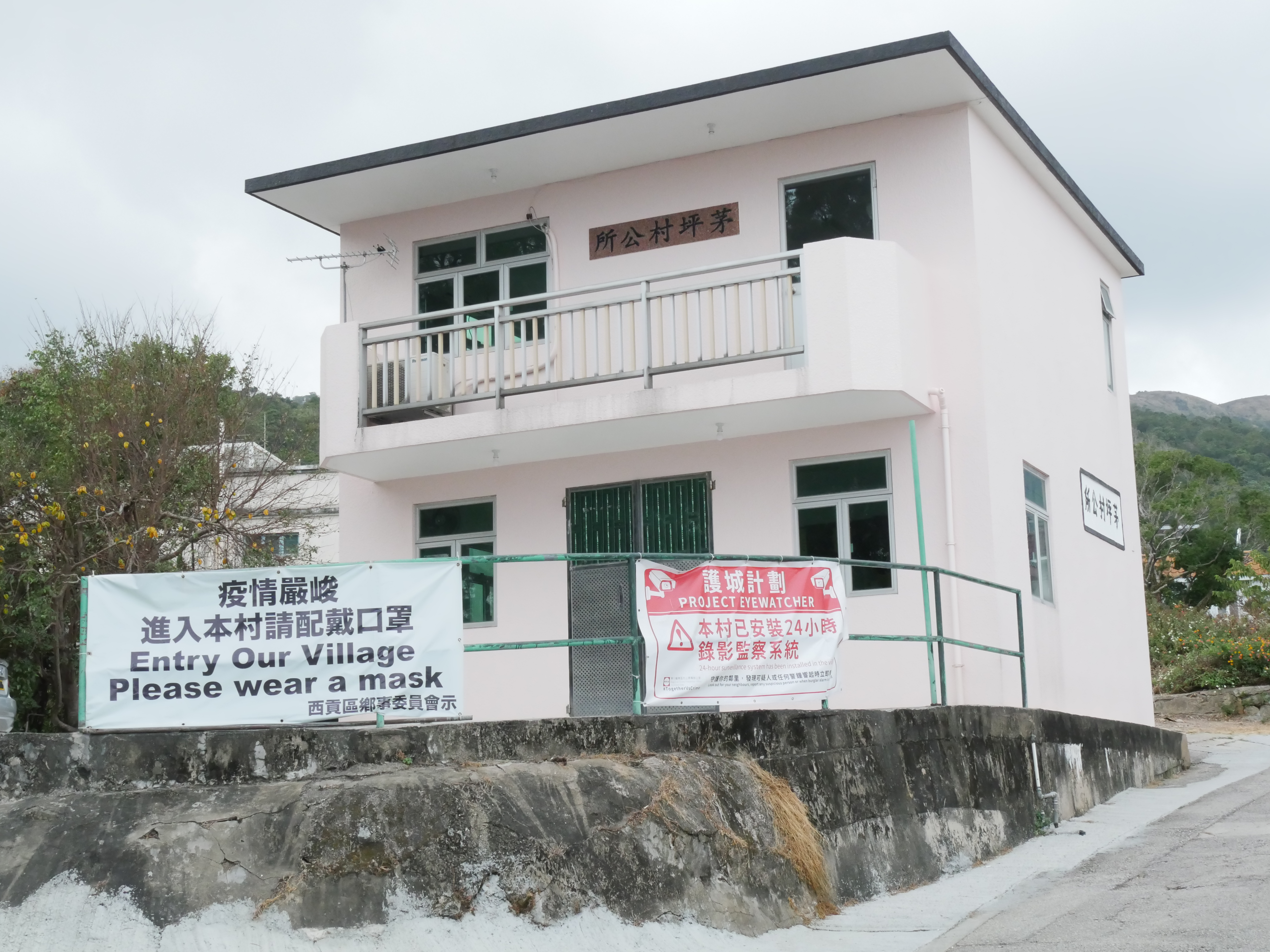
Mau Ping Village Office in Mau Ping New Village.

Mau Ping New Village (Chinese: 茅坪新村) is a village in Sai Kung District, Hong Kong.

Nearby villages include Pak Kong, Pak Kong Au and Wong Chuk Shan New Village.

== Administration ==
Mau Ping New Village is a recognized village under the New Territories Small House Policy.

== See also ==
- Mau Ping
