= Kong Pui =

Coordinates: 22.364882°N 114.211502°E

Kong Pui (Chinese: 崗背) or Kong Pui Tsuen (崗背村; 'Kong Pui Village') is a village in Sha Tin District, Hong Kong.

== Administration ==
Kong Pui Tsuen is a recognized village under the New Territories Small House Policy.

== See also ==
- Kwun Yam Shan (Sha Tin District)
