= Wo Keng Shan =

Village in Ta Kwu Ling, Hong Kong

Coordinates: 22.536582°N 114.17001°E

Wo Keng Shan (Chinese: 禾徑山) is a village in Ta Kwu Ling, North District, Hong Kong.

== Administration ==
Wo Keng Shan is a recognized village under the New Territories Small House Policy.

== See also ==
- List of planning areas in Hong Kong
