= Man Wo =

Coordinates: 22.35323°N 114.235944°E

Man Wo (Chinese: 蠻窩) is a village in Sai Kung District, Hong Kong.

== Administration ==
Man Wo is a recognized village under the New Territories Small House Policy.

== History ==
Man Wo, together with its off-shoot Chuk Yuen, was part of the inter-village grouping, the Ho Chung Tung (蠔涌洞) or Ho Chung Seven Villages (蠔涌七鄉), which had its centre in Ho Chung.
