= Tei Tong Tsai =

Coordinates: 22.257717°N 113.92689°E

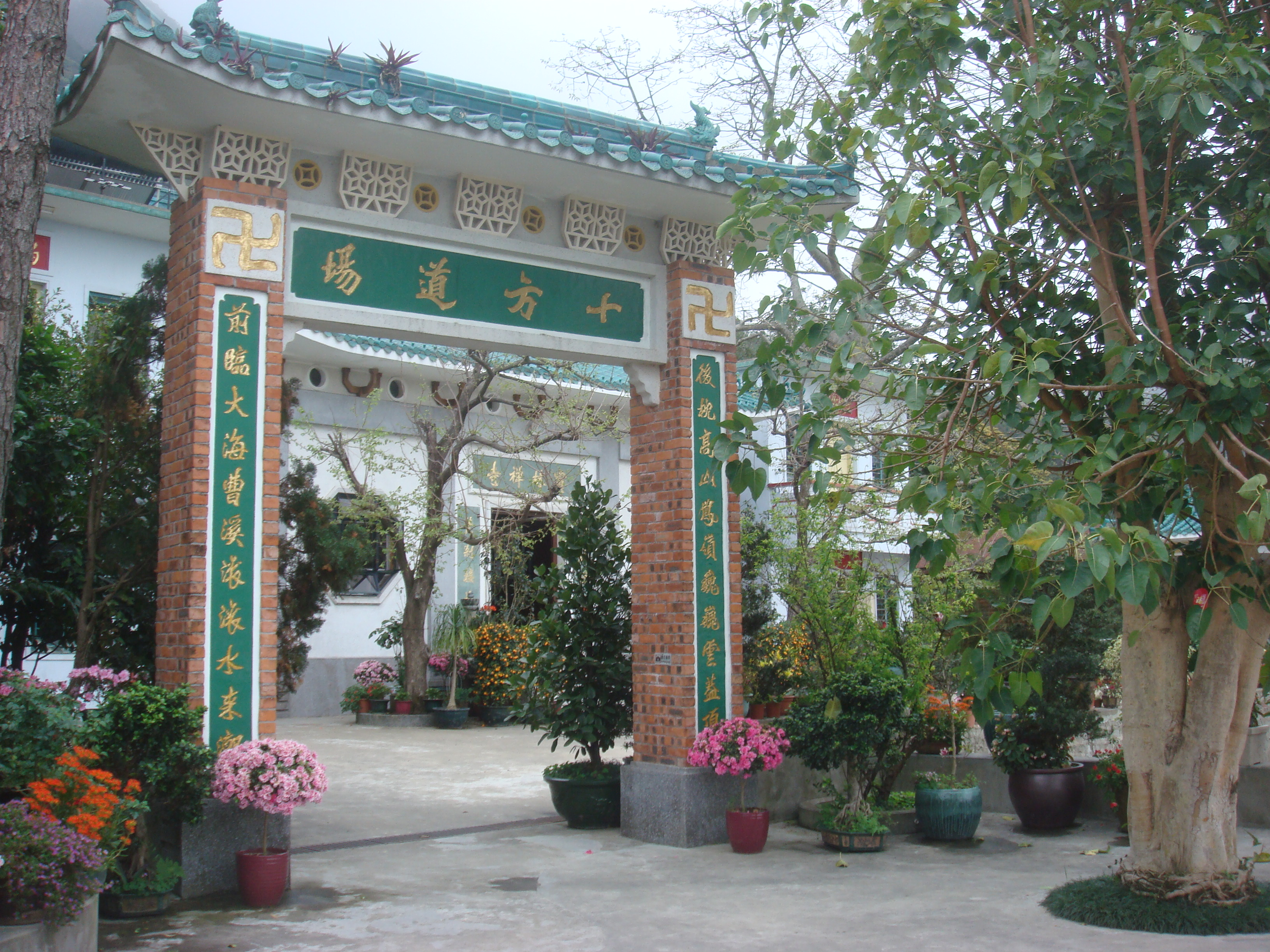
Po Lam Monastery (寶林寺) at Tei Tong Tsai.

Tei Tong Tsai (Chinese: 地塘仔) is a village on Lantau Island, Hong Kong.

== Administration ==
Tei Tong Tsai is a recognized village under the New Territories Small House Policy.

== Features ==
Tei Tong Tsai, together with Ngong Ping, Luk Wu, Keung Shan and Man Cheung Po are considered as the five major Buddhist sites of Lantau Island, hosting numerous temples and gardens.
