= Shek Nga Shan =

Hill in Hong Kong

Coordinates: 22.38194°N 114.23538°E

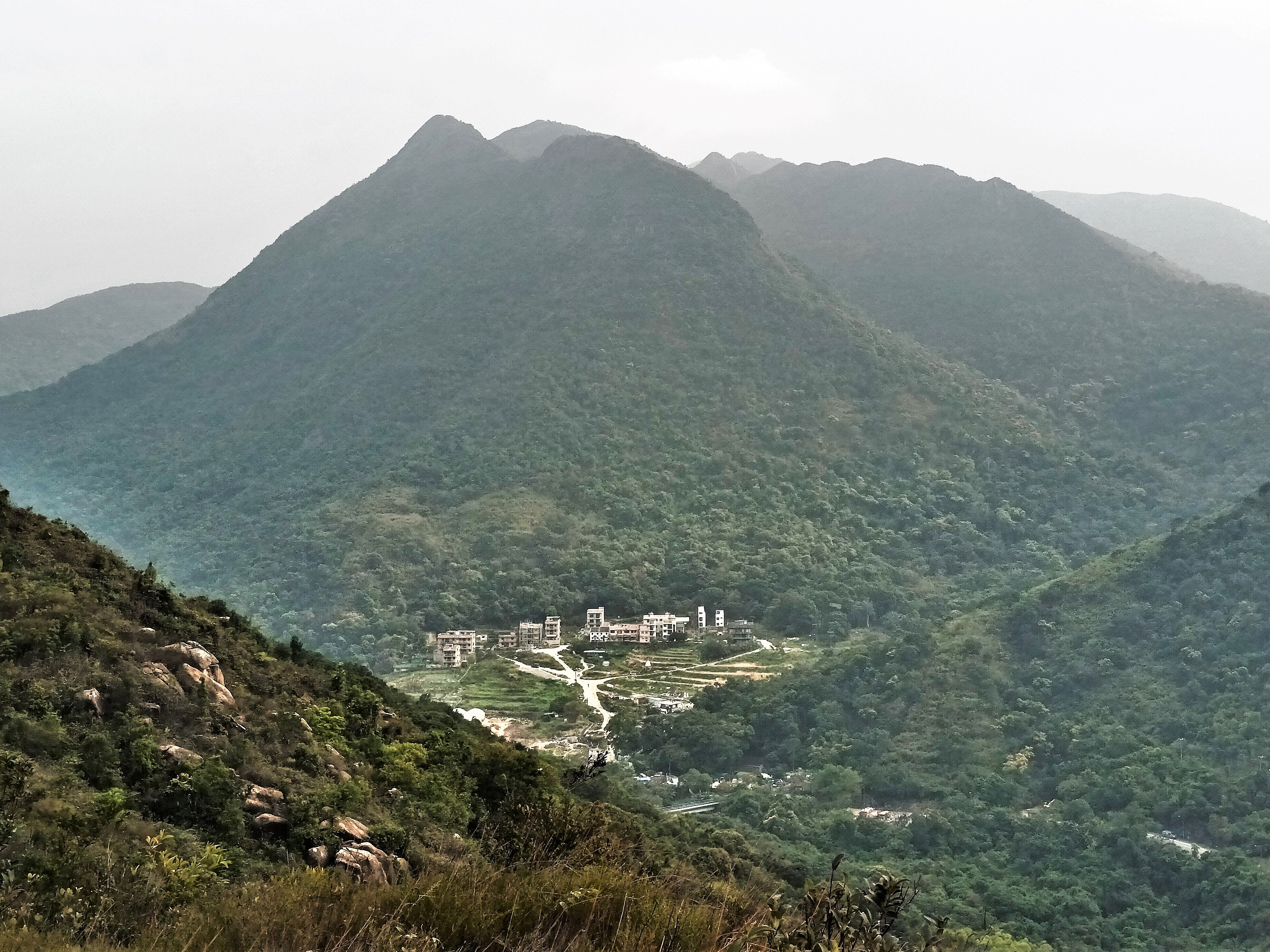
View of Mui Tsz Lam at the foot of Shek Nga Shan.

Shek Nga Shan (Chinese: 石芽山; lit. 'stone bud hill') is a 540 m high hill in Ma On Shan Country Park, Hong Kong.

== Access ==
Shek Nga Shan can be reached via footpaths from Mui Tsz Lam or Fa Sam Hang. Nearby hills include Buffalo Hill and West Buffalo Hill.
