= Wong Chuk Shan New Village =

Coordinates: 22.3851°N 114.261207°E

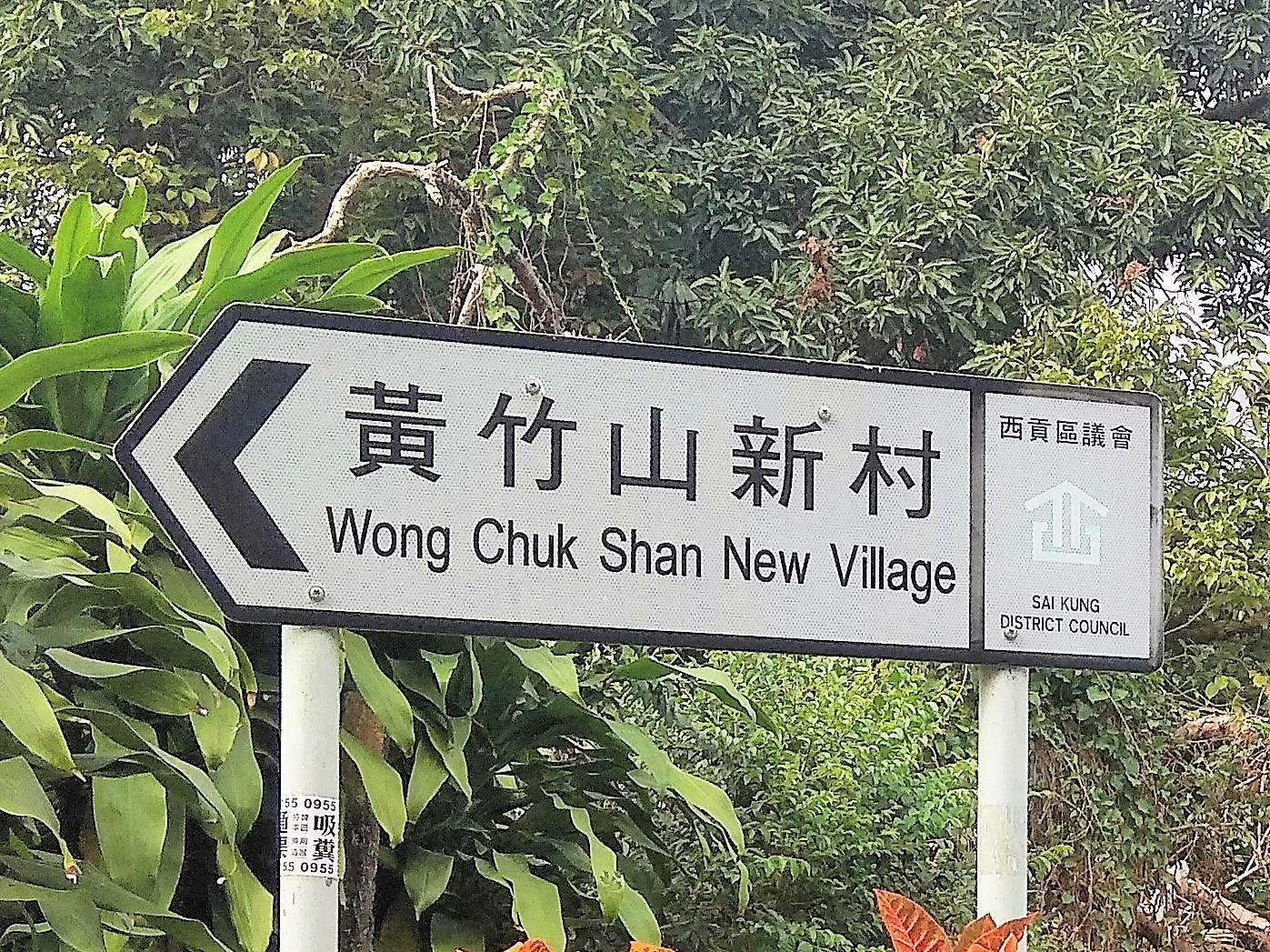
Wong Chuk Shan New Village sign.

Wong Chuk Shan New Village (Chinese: 黃竹山新村) is a village in Sai Kung District, Hong Kong.

Nearby villages include Mau Ping New Village, Pak Kong and Pak Kong Au.

== Administration ==
Wong Chuk Shan New Village is a recognized village under the New Territories Small House Policy.
