= Man Cheung Po =

Coordinates: 22.229263°N 113.866854°E

Man Cheung Po (Chinese: 萬丈布) is an area of Lantau Island in Hong Kong.

== History ==
In 1955, Austin Coates described Man Cheung Po as a small settlement with a population of about 20, "high up in the hills, 40 minutes hard walking from Leung Uk", there principal dwelling being is a Buddhist nunnery partly rebuilt in 1953.

== Features ==
Man Cheung Po, together with Ngong Ping, Keung Shan, Luk Wu and Tei Tong Tsai are considered as the five major Buddhist sites of Lantau Island, hosting numerous temples and gardens.

Tsz Hing Monastery (慈興寺) is located at Man Cheung Po.

== Access ==
Man Cheung Po is located at the end of stage 5 and at the start of stage 6 of the Lantau Trail.
