= Mau Ping =

Area of Hong Kong

Coordinates: 22.384565°N 114.241957°E

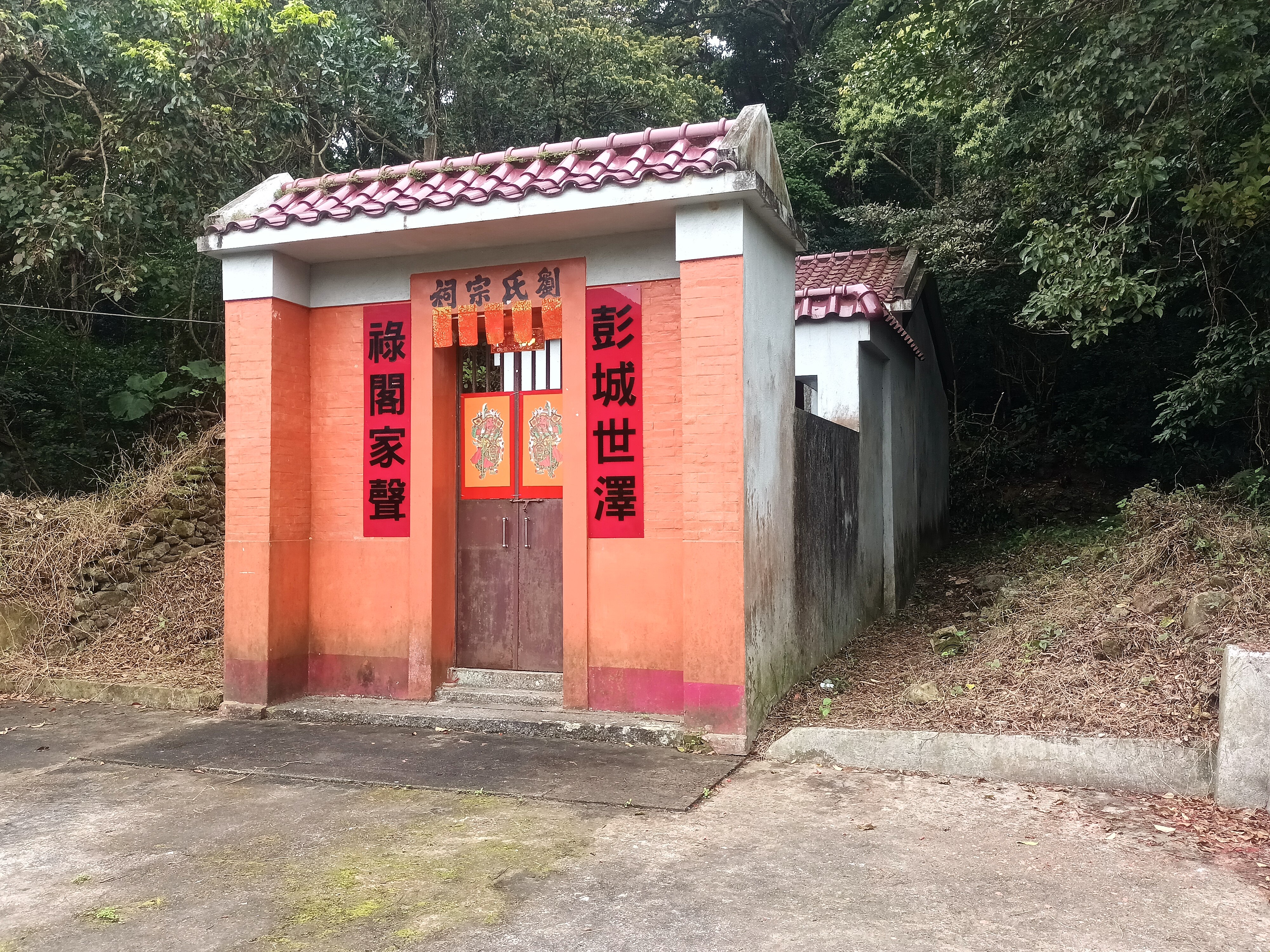
Lau (劉) Ancestral Hall in Mau Ping.

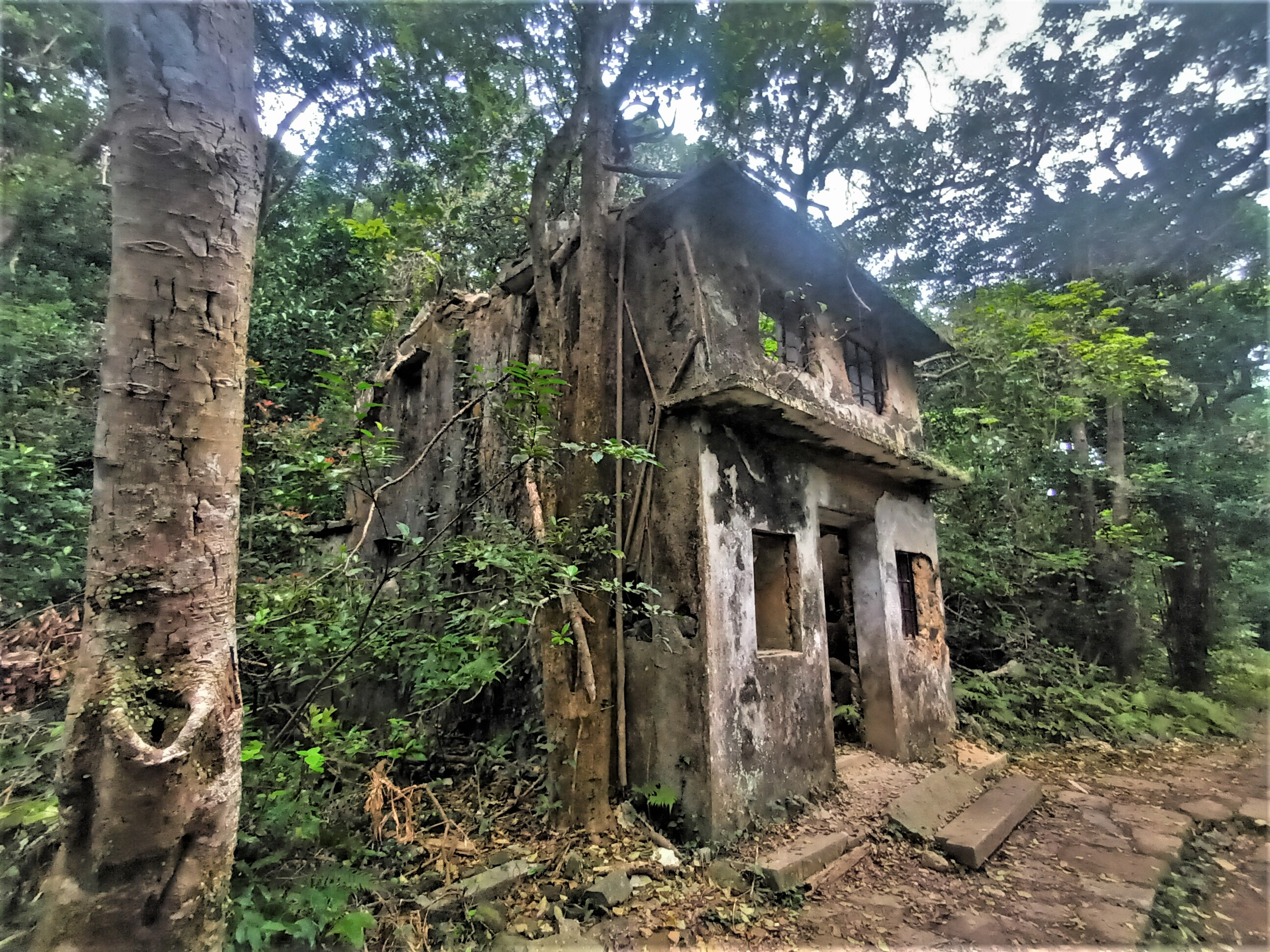
Abandoned house in Mau Ping.

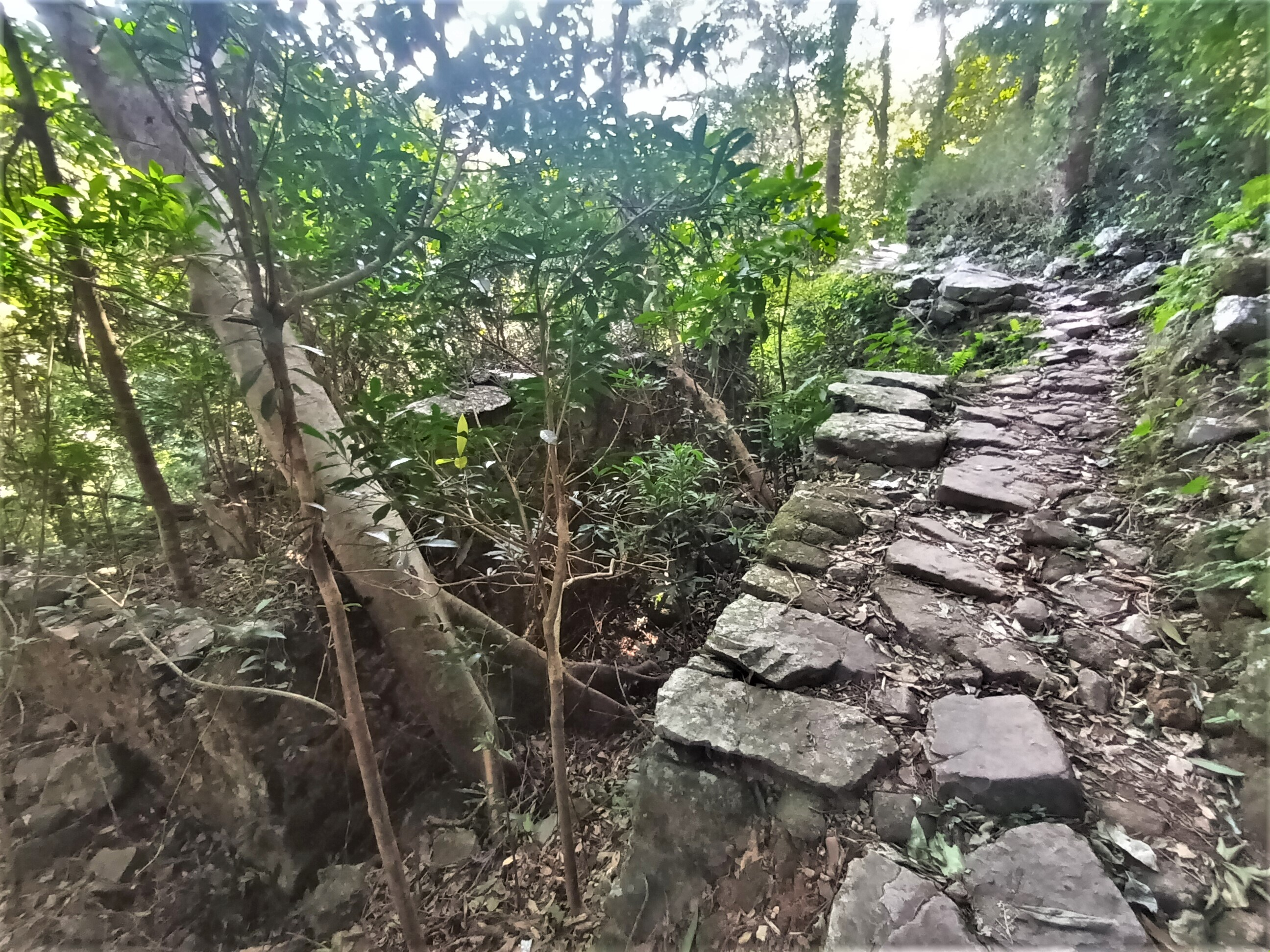
Section of the Mau Ping Ancient Trail (茅坪古道) at Mau Ping.

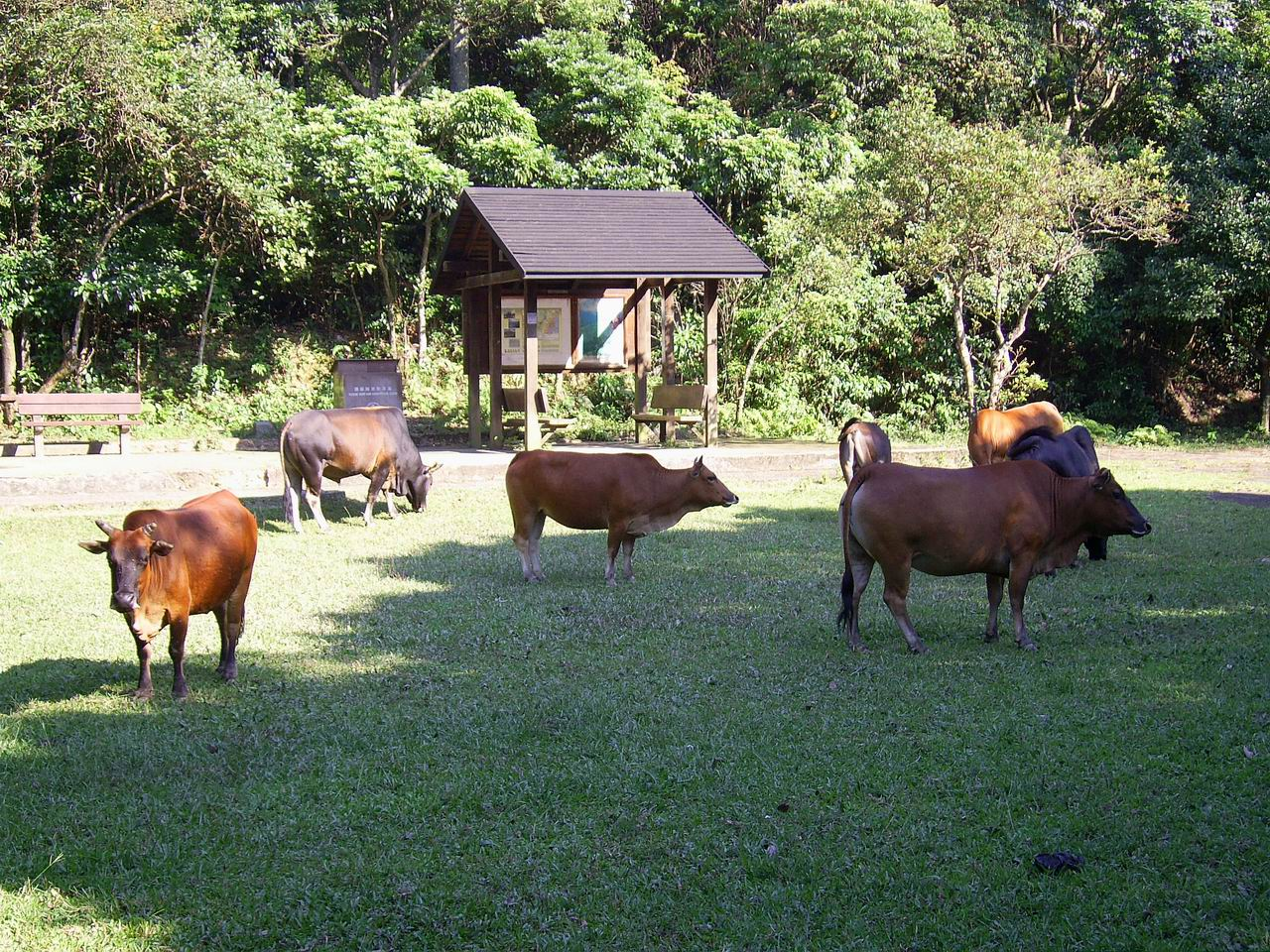
Mau Ping Resting Area (茅坪休息處) is located at Mau Ping Au (茅坪坳; 'Mau Ping Pass'), at the crossroad of several hiking trails, including the Mau Ping Ancient Trail and the MacLehose Trail Section 4.

Mau Ping (Chinese: 茅坪; lit. 'Grass Field') is an area and the site of a former village in Hong Kong. It is located within Ma On Shan Country Park and is administratively part of Sha Tin District. The area includes Mau Ping Lo Uk (茅坪老屋) and Mau Ping San Uk (茅坪新屋).

== Administration ==
Mau Ping is a recognized village under the New Territories Small House Policy.

== History ==
The village of Mau Ping, together with neighboring Mui Tsz Lam, were historically part of the Luk Yeuk (league), centered on the township of Sai Kung. At the time of the 1911 census, the population of Mau Ping (Mu Ping) was 124. The number of males was 57.

== Conservation ==
A dense woodland with an area of 3.7 hectares, within the Mau Ping area, has been listed as a Site of Special Scientific Interest since 1979.

== Access ==
Mau Ping is only accessible by hiking paths, including Mau Ping Ancient Trail (茅坪古道) from Mui Tsz Lam, Pak Kong Ancient Trail (北港古道) from Pak Kong, Wong Chuk Shan Ancient Trail (黃竹山古道) from Buffalo Pass via Wong Chuk Shan, and Section 4 of the MacLehose Trail.

== See also ==
- Mau Ping New Village
