= Tai Lam Wu =

Village in Hong Kong

Coordinates: 22.349746°N 114.234443°E

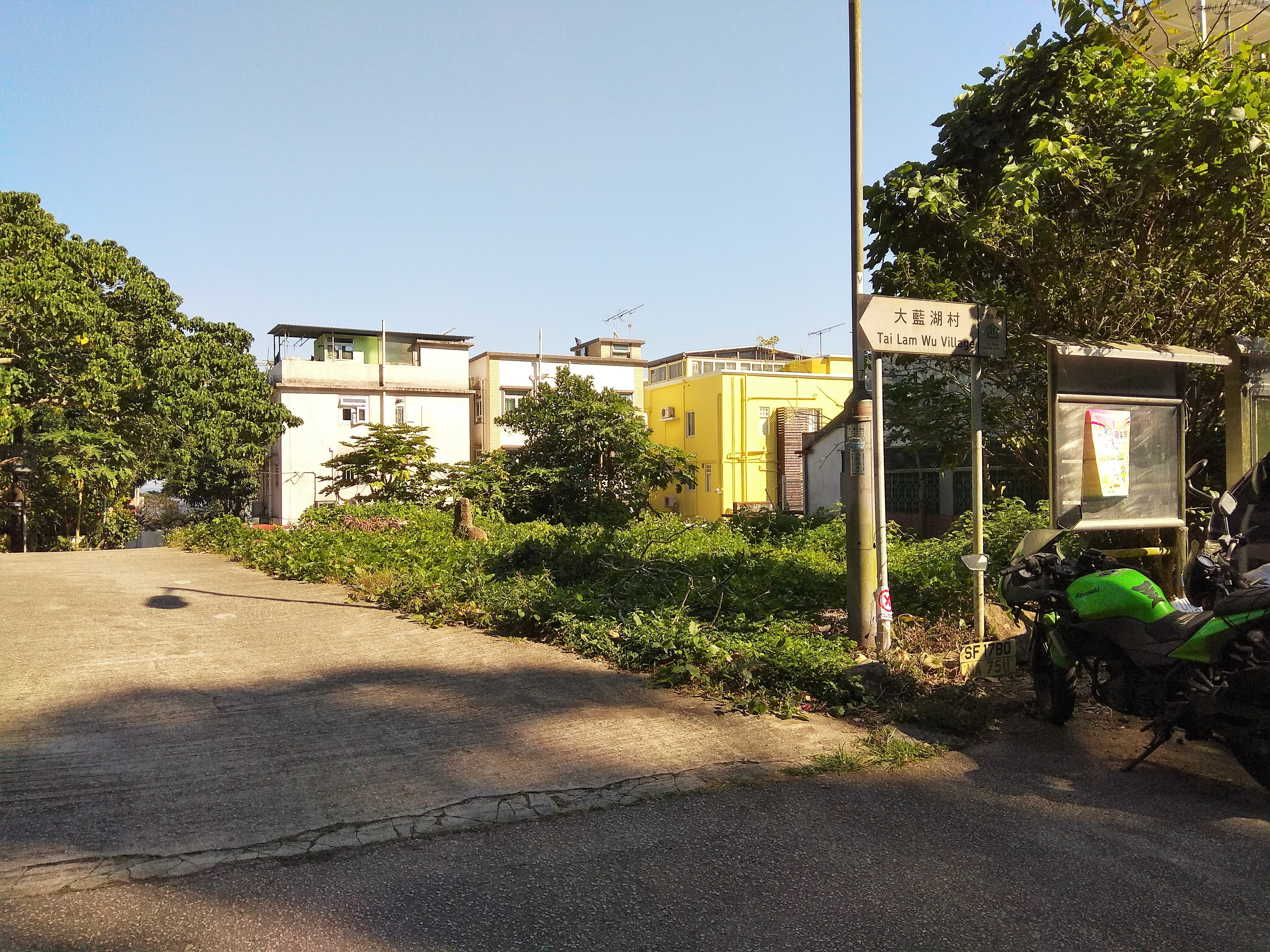
Tai Lam Wu Village.

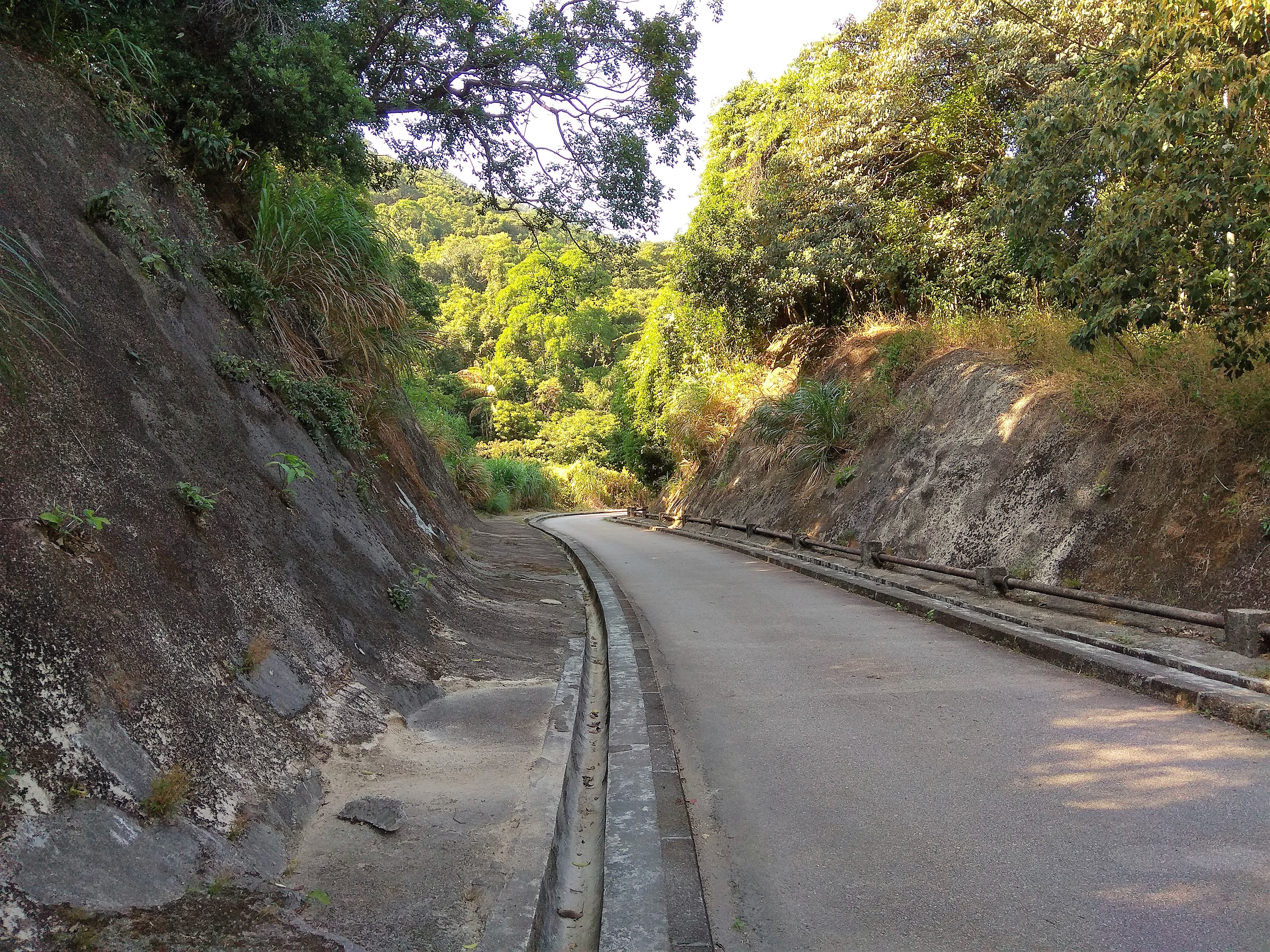
Tai Lam Wu Road near Tai Lam Wu Village.

Tai Lam Wu (Chinese: 大藍湖) is a village in Sai Kung District, Hong Kong.

== Administration ==
Tai Lam Wu, including Ngau Liu (牛寮), is a recognized village under the New Territories Small House Policy.

== History ==
Tai Lam Wu was part of the inter-village grouping, the Ho Chung Tung (蠔涌洞) or Ho Chung Seven Villages (蠔涌七鄉), which had its centre in Ho Chung.

At the time of the 1911 census, the population of Ngau Liu was 14. The number of males was 5.

In 1955, Austin Coates reported that Ngau Liu was very small Punti hamlet, comprising two families surnamed Wan and Chan. He described the village as a subsidiary of Tai Lam Wu.
