= Mui Tsz Lam (Sha Tin District) =

Village of Hong Kong

Coordinates: 22.390977°N 114.234106°E

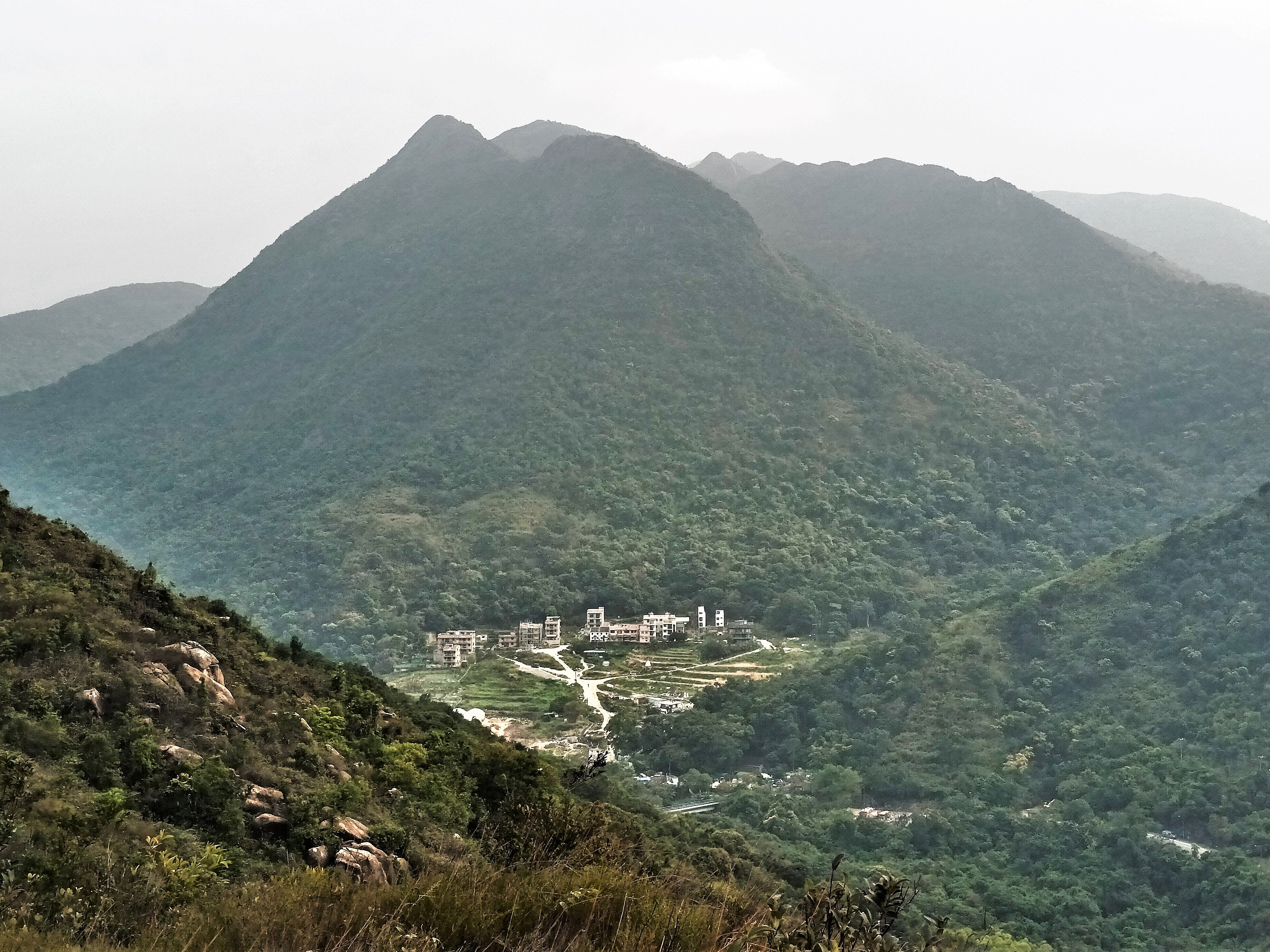
View of Mui Tsz Lam with Shek Nga Shan in the background in 2022.

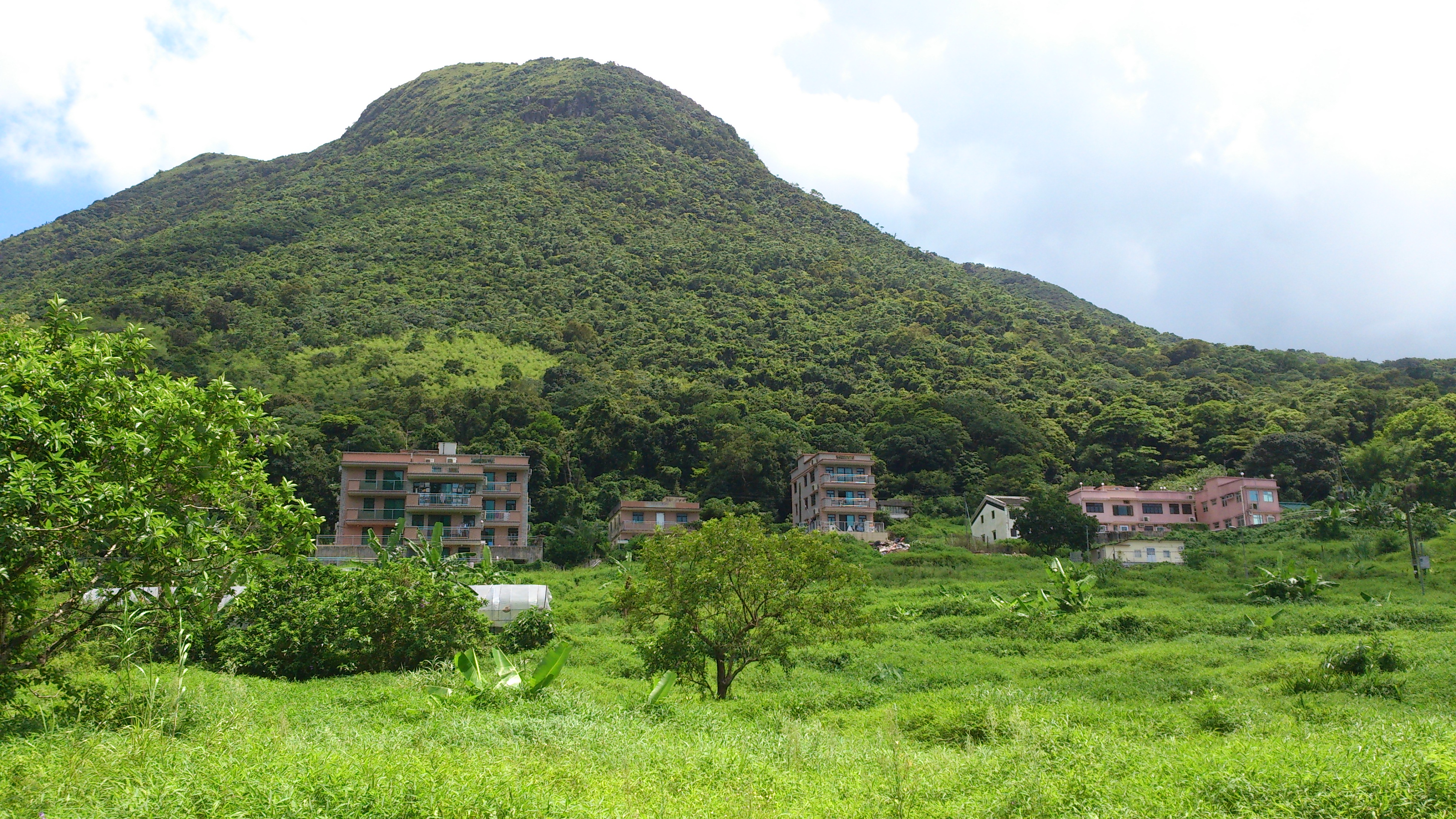
View of Mui Tsz Lam with Shek Nga Shan in the background in 2015.

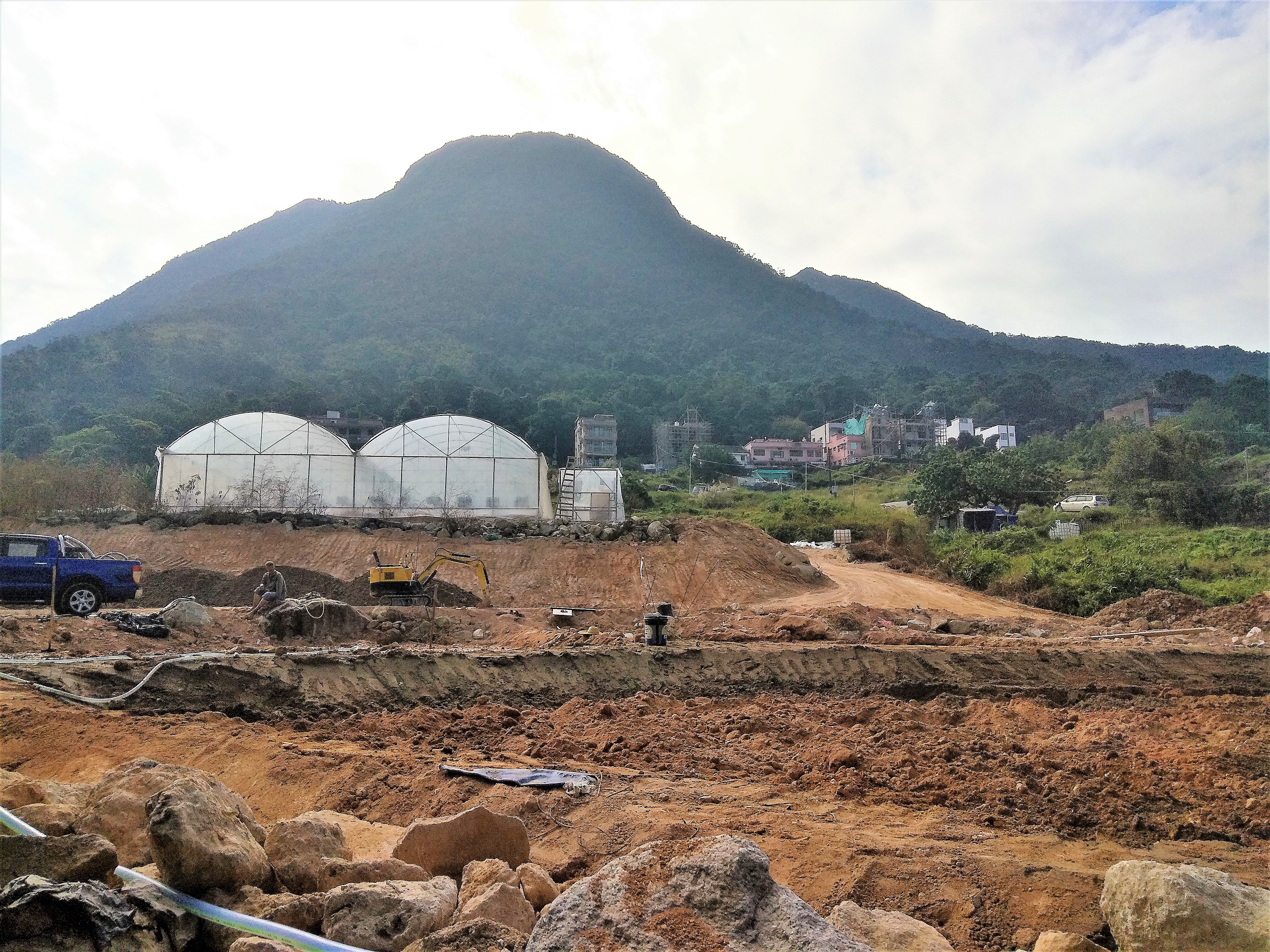
View of Mui Tsz Lam in 2020.

Mui Tsz Lam (Chinese: 梅子林; lit. 'Plum Grove') is a village in Sha Tin District, Hong Kong.

== Administration ==
Mui Tsz Lam is a recognized village under the New Territories Small House Policy.

== History ==
Mui Tsz Lam, together with neighboring Mau Ping, were historically part of the Luk Yeuk (league), centered on the township of Sai Kung.
