= To Kwa Peng =

Coordinates: 22.427493°N 114.336831°E

To Kwa Peng (Chinese: 土瓜坪) is a village of in the Sai Kung North area of Tai Po District, Hong Kong.

== Administration ==
To Kwa Peng is a recognized village under the New Territories Small House Policy.
