= Kwun Yam Shan (Sha Tin District) =

Village in Hong Kong

Coordinates: 22.364002°N 114.214738°E

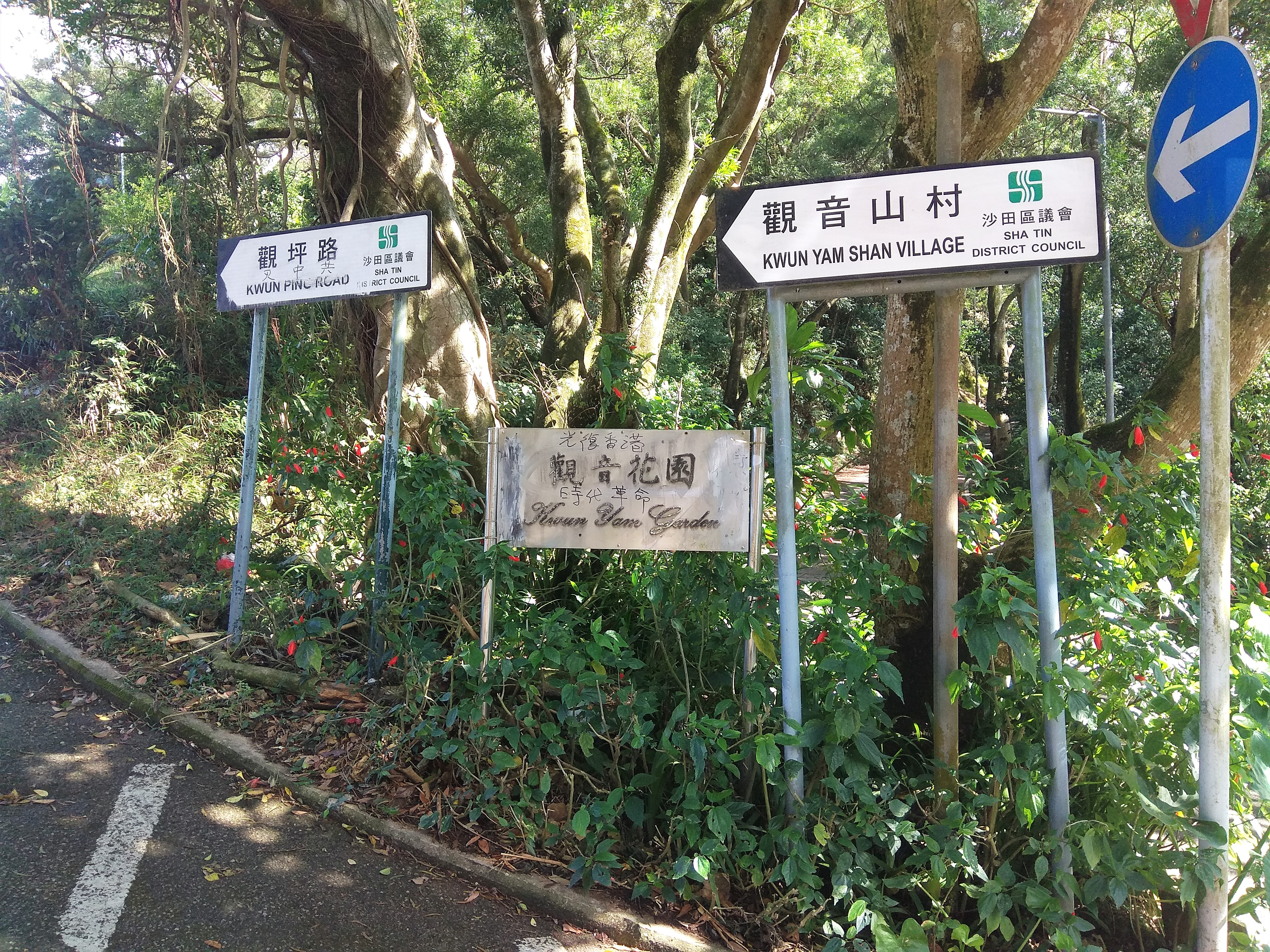
Sign at Tiu Tso Ngam (吊草岩) indicating Kwun Yam Shan Village.

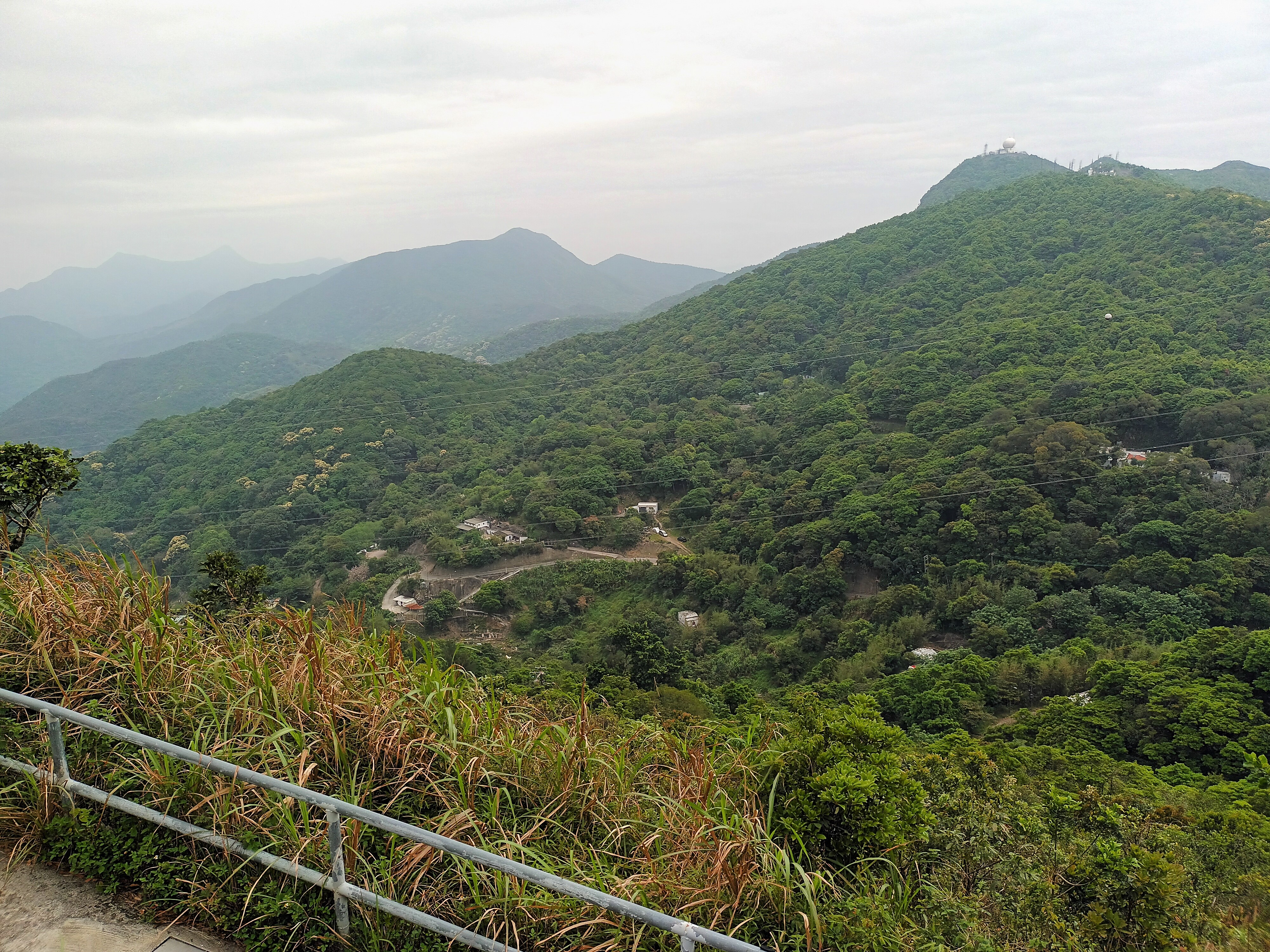
Partial view of Kwun Yam Shan from Temple Hill. Tate's Cairn is visible in the background.

Kwun Yam Shan (Chinese: 觀音山) is a village in Sha Tin District, Hong Kong.

== Village status ==
Kwun Yam Shan is a recognised village under the New Territories Small House Policy.

== See also ==
- Kong Pui
