= Keung Shan =

Mountain on Lantau Island, Hong Kong

- 羗山
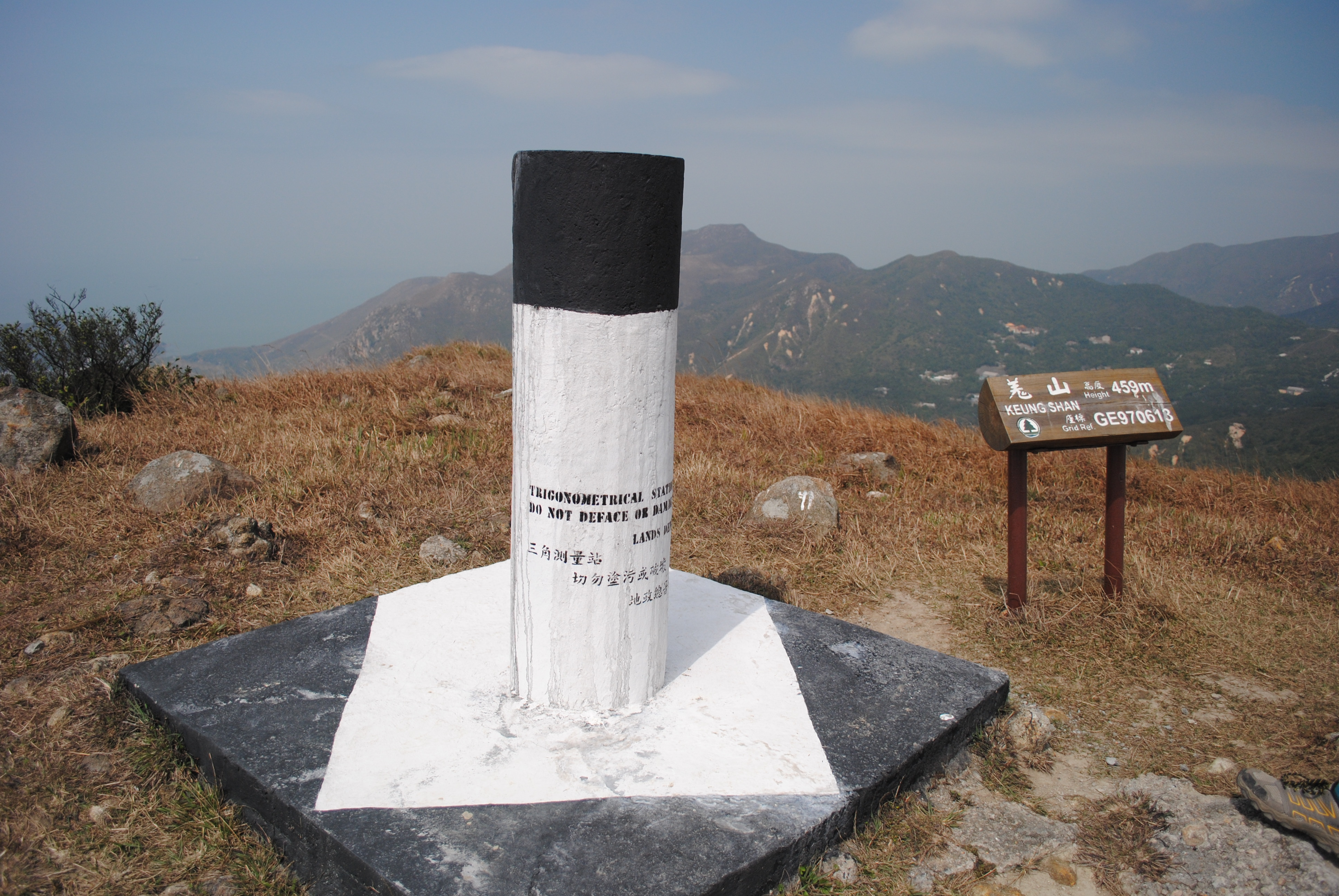
- Summit of Keung Shan

Highest point
- Elevation: 459 m (1,506 ft)
- Coordinates: 22°13′55″N 113°52′53″E

Geography
- Location within Hong Kong
- Location: Lantau Island, Hong Kong

Keung Shan (Chinese: 羗山, literally "Ginger Mountain") is a peak in Hong Kong, on southwestern Lantau Island, with a height of 459 metres (1,506 ft) above sea level.

== Geology ==
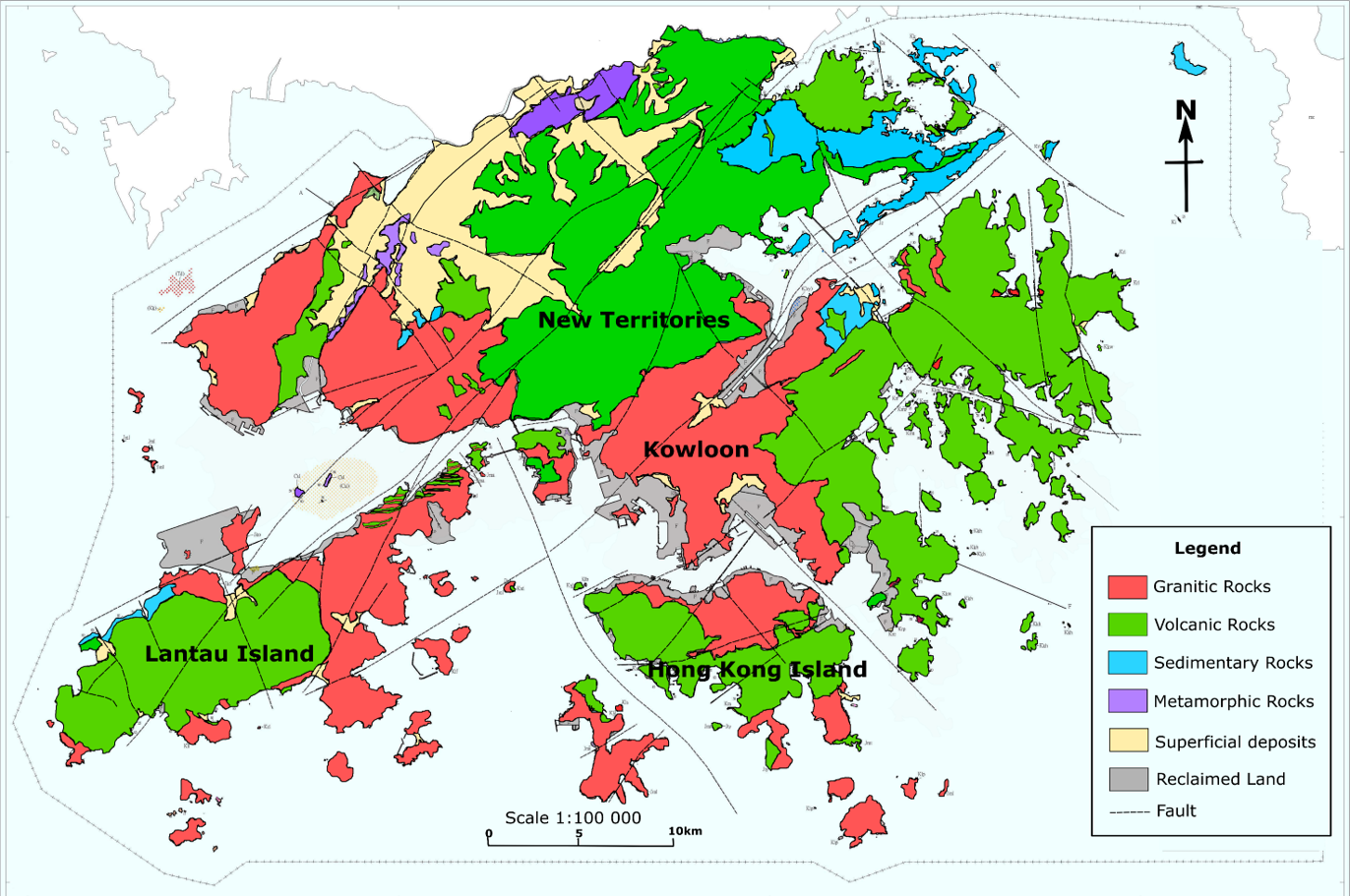
Geological map of Hong Kong showing the distribution of faults and different rock types in Hong Kong. Keung Shan is in the green area (volcanic rock) on Lantau Island

Keung Shan is formed by volcanic rocks, including porphyritic rhyolites, similar to nearby Lantau Peak and Sunset Peak.

== Access ==
The Lantau Trail traverses the summit of this hill.

== Villages ==
The villages of Lower Keung Shan (下羗山) and Upper Keung Shan (上羗山) are located north of the hill. Both are recognised villages under the New Territories Small House Policy. The Keung Shan area, together with Luk Wu, Ngong Ping, Tei Tong Tsai and Man Cheung Po are considered as the five major Buddhist sites of Lantau Island, hosting numerous temples and gardens.

== See also ==
- List of mountains, peaks and hills in Hong Kong
