= Ho Chung =

Village in Hong Kong

Coordinates: 22.35561°N 114.24663°E

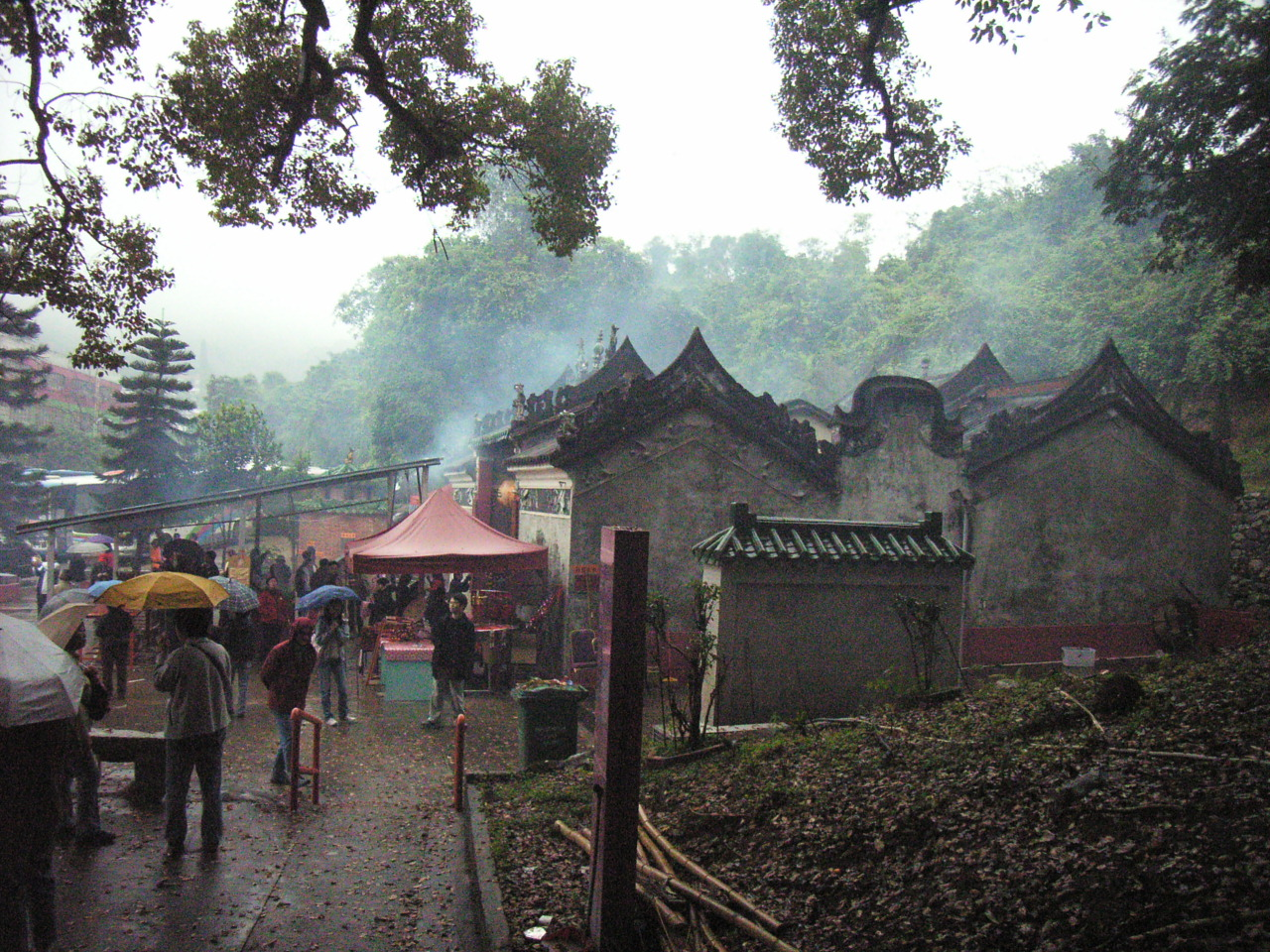
Che Kung Temple in Ho Chung in March 2007.

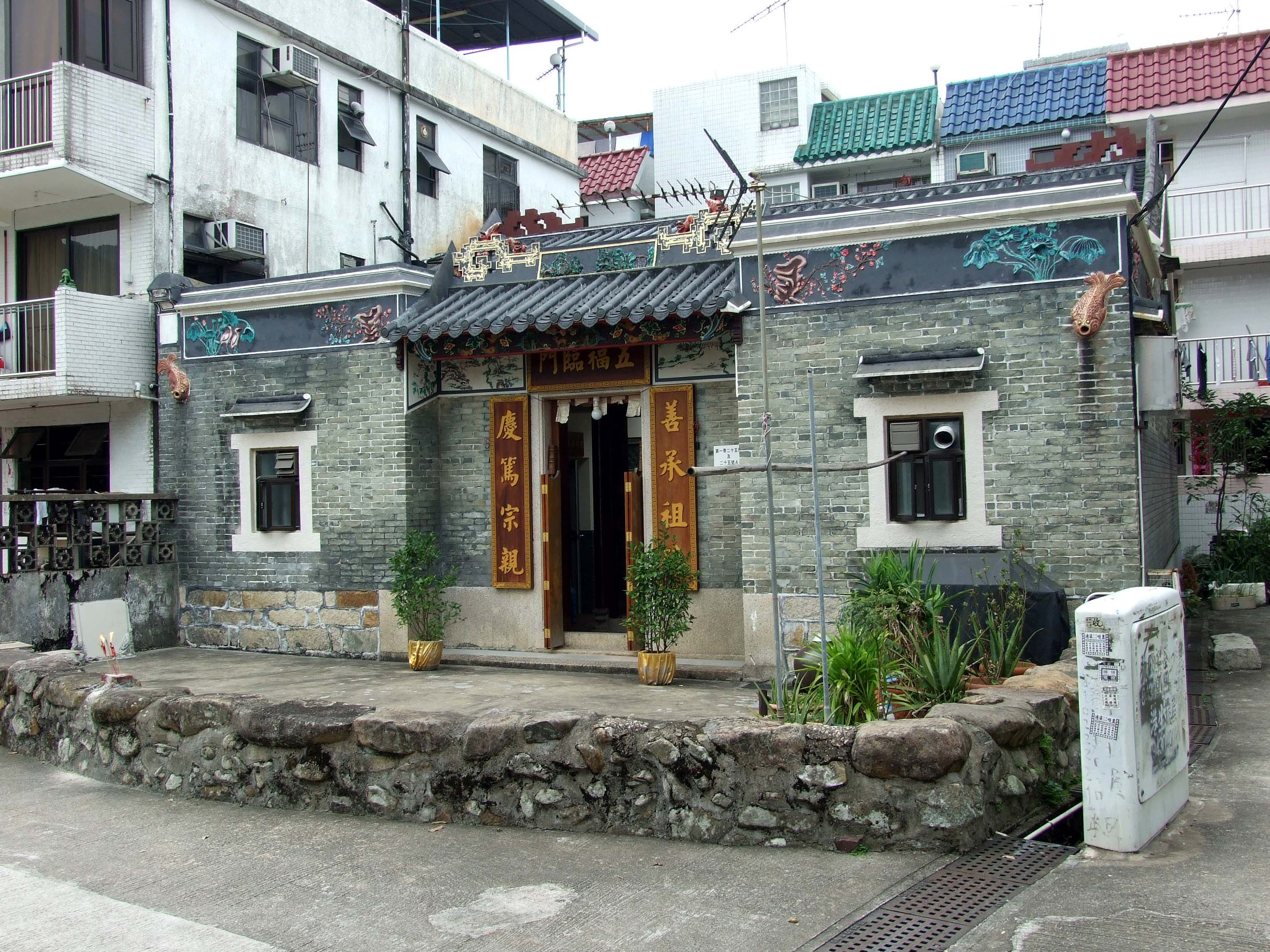
Chan Ancestral Hall in Ho Chung in September 2012.

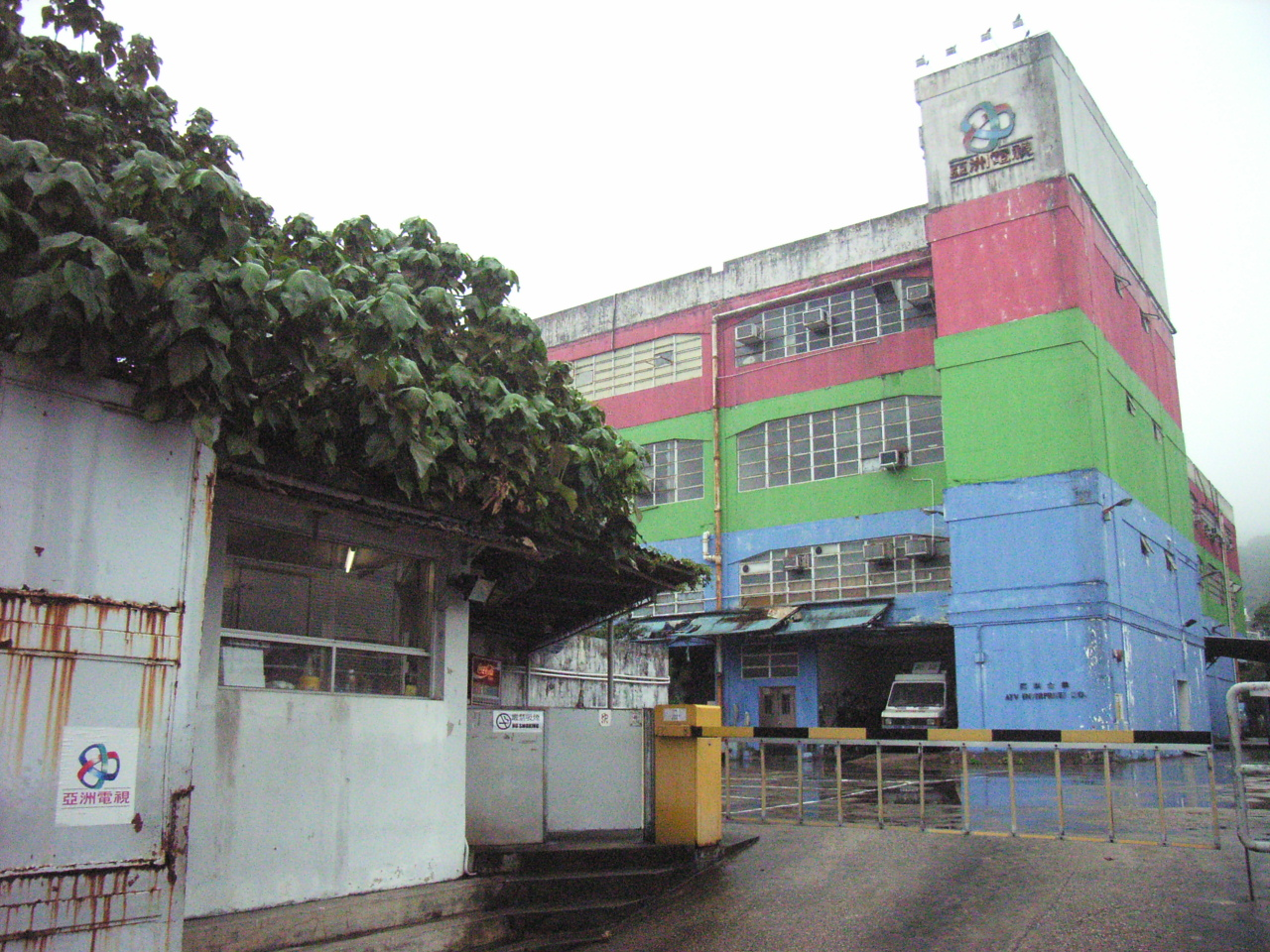
Former ATV studio building, near the Che Kung Temple, in Ho Chung in March 2007.

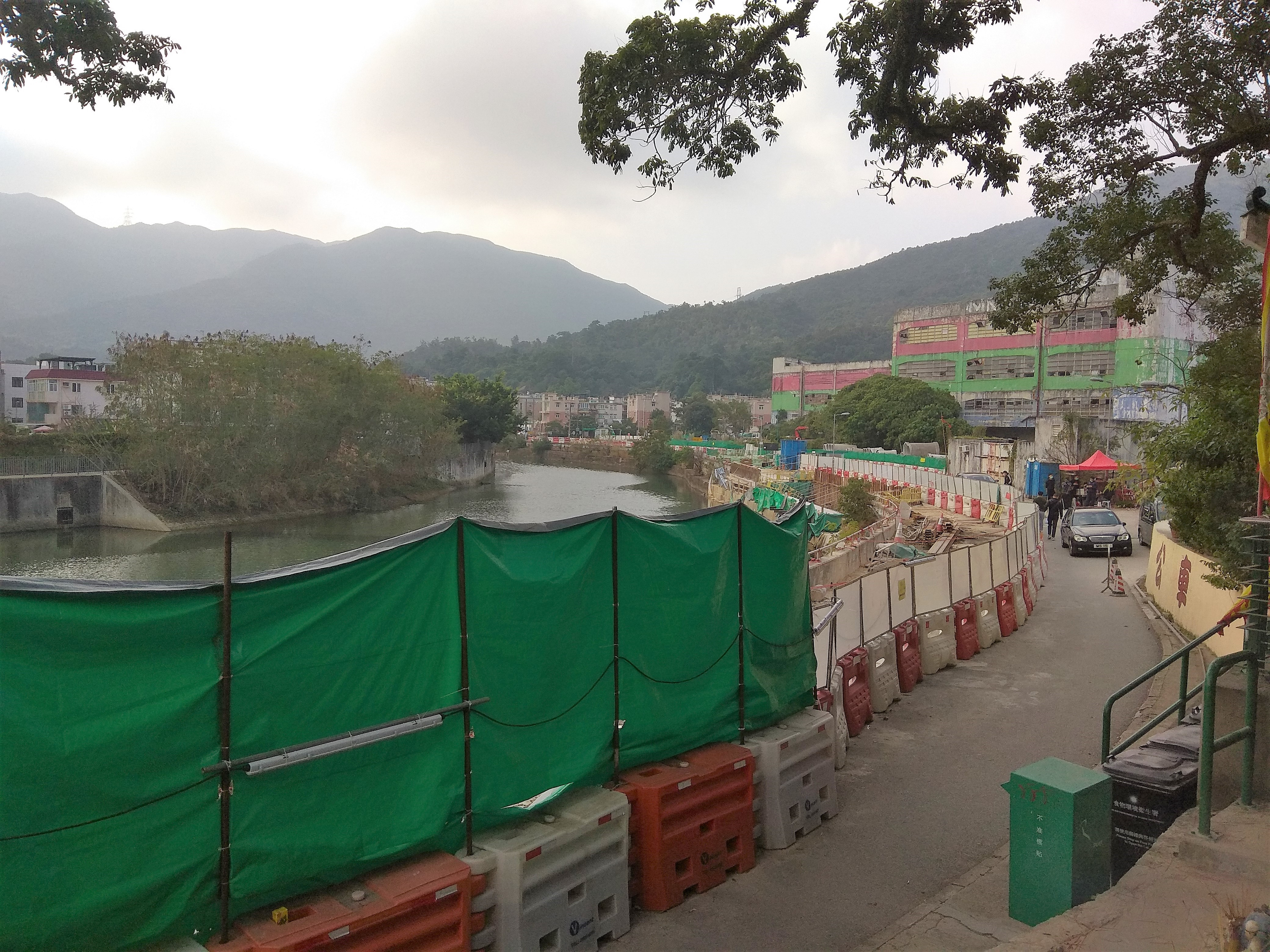
Ho Chung River and Ho Chung Road near Che Kung Temple in Ho Chung.

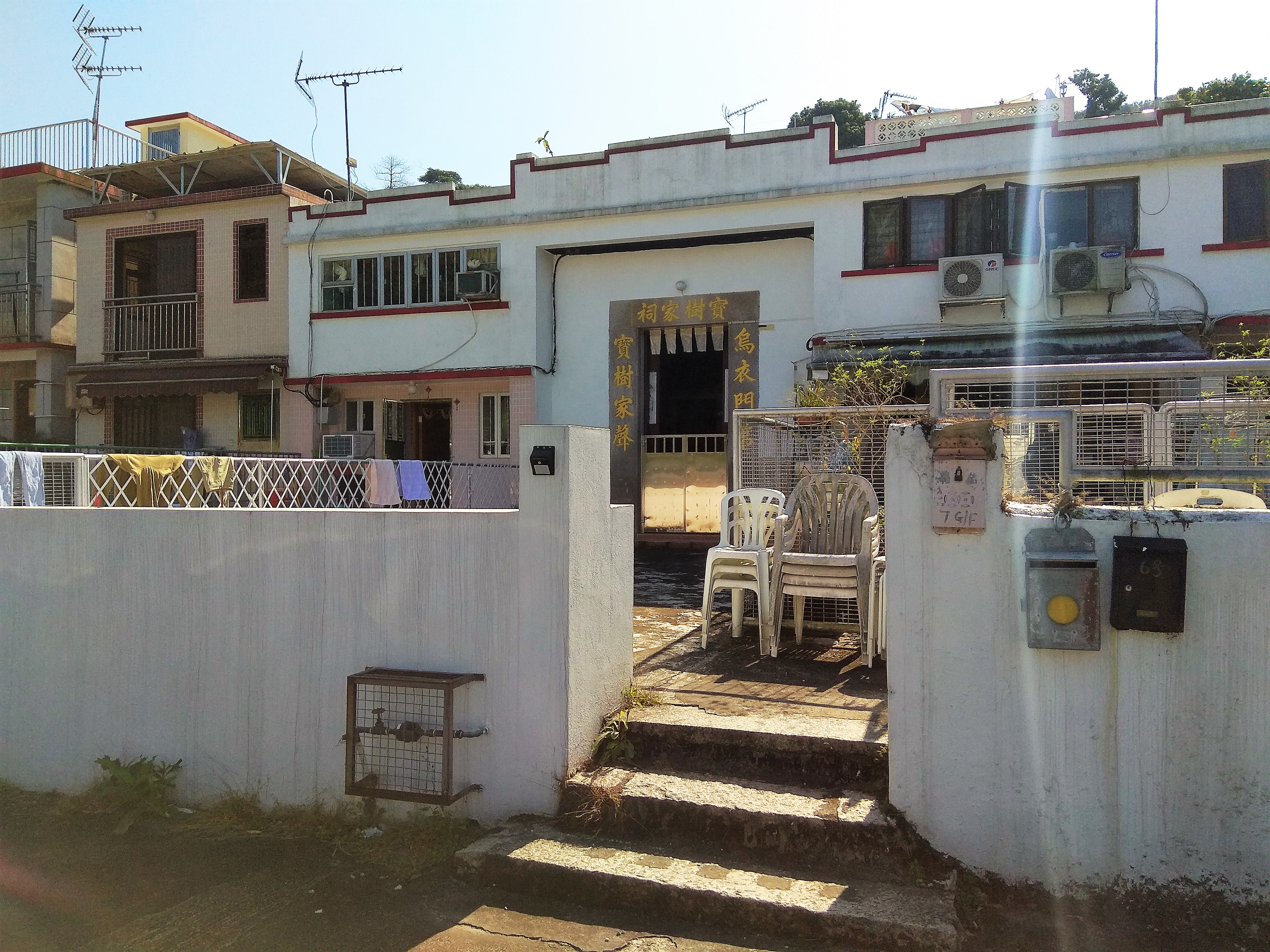
Po Shue Ancestral Hall (寶樹家祠) in Nam Pin Wai.

Ho Chung (Chinese: 蠔涌; Jyutping: hou4 cung1; Cantonese Yale: hòuh chūng) is a village on the Sai Kung Peninsula in Hong Kong. The Ho Chung River (蠔涌河) runs through the village.

== Administration ==
Ho Chung is a recognized village under the New Territories Small House Policy.

== History ==
A Neolithic stone-working site was discovered at Ho Chung in 1999.

The village was likely founded in the mid-16th century.

Ho Chung was the centre of an inter-village grouping, the Ho Chung Tung (蠔涌洞) or Ho Chung Seven Villages (蠔涌七鄉). This grouping owned the Che Kung Temple at Ho Chung. It comprised the Punti villages of Ho Chung, Nam Pin Wai, Mok Tse Che, Tai Lam Wu (including its off-shoot Ngau Liu), Man Wo (including its off-shoot Chuk Yuen), Tai Po Tsai (on Clear Water Bay Peninsula), and Sheung Sze Wan (on Clearwater Bay Peninsula). Shek Pok Wai (石壆圍), considered as an off-shoot of Ho Chung, is also included.

At the time of the 1911 census, the population of Ho Chung was 418; the number of males was 159. The population of Shek Pok Wai was 13; the number of males was 4.

Austin Coates reported in 1955 that Nam Pin Wai was a "Cantonese hamlet, subsidiary of Ho Chung".

== Sights ==
The Che Kung Temple in Ho Chung, one of the two temples in Hong Kong dedicated to Che Kung, is a Grade I Historic Building.

The Chan Ancestral Hall, at No. 25 Ho Chung First Lane was built around the 1850s. It is a Grade III Historic Building.

== Industrial buildings ==
Lee Kum Kee formerly had an oyster sauce and soy sauce factory in Ho Chung, adjacent to a Lee Seng Heng fish sauce factory. The Lee Kum Kee factory closed between 1996 and 1999, and by 2013 both sauce factories were noted to have been shuttered for years. There is also a former multistory dye works, that was once used as an Asia Television studio.

== See also ==
- Wo Mei, an adjacent village located south of Ho Chung.
