= Luk Wu =

Area and village in Hong Kong

Coordinates: 22.250616°N 113.888460°E

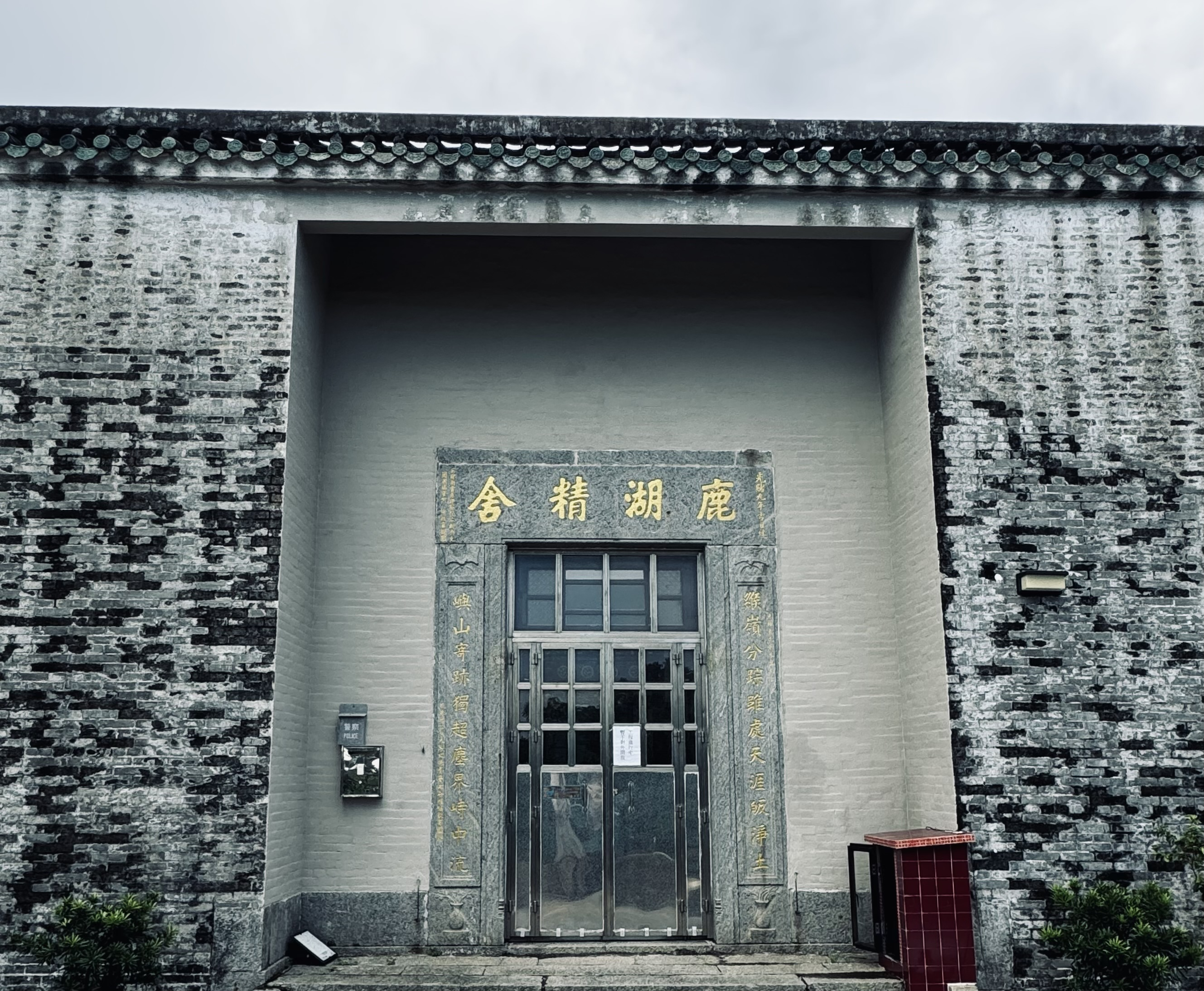
The century old entrance of Luk Wu Chin She Temple (鹿湖精舍)

Luk Wu Tsuen (Chinese: 鹿湖村; lit. 'Deer Lake Village') is an area and a village of Lantau Island in Hong Kong, home to several Buddhist monasteries.

The place was named as such since deer could be found there in the past and the landscape looks like a lake.

== Administration ==
Luk Wu is a recognized village under the New Territories Small House Policy.

== Features ==
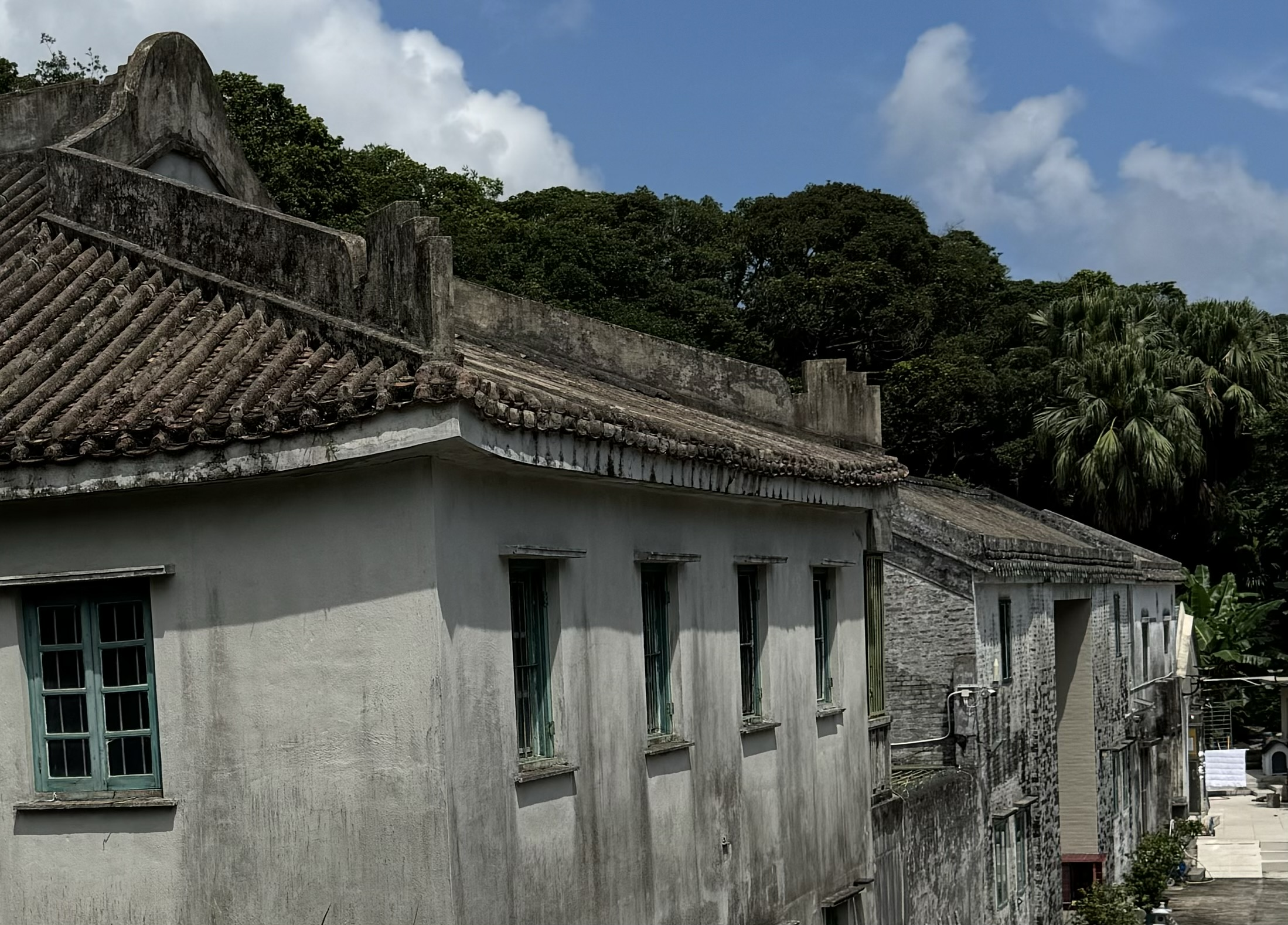
Luk Wu Chin She Monastery

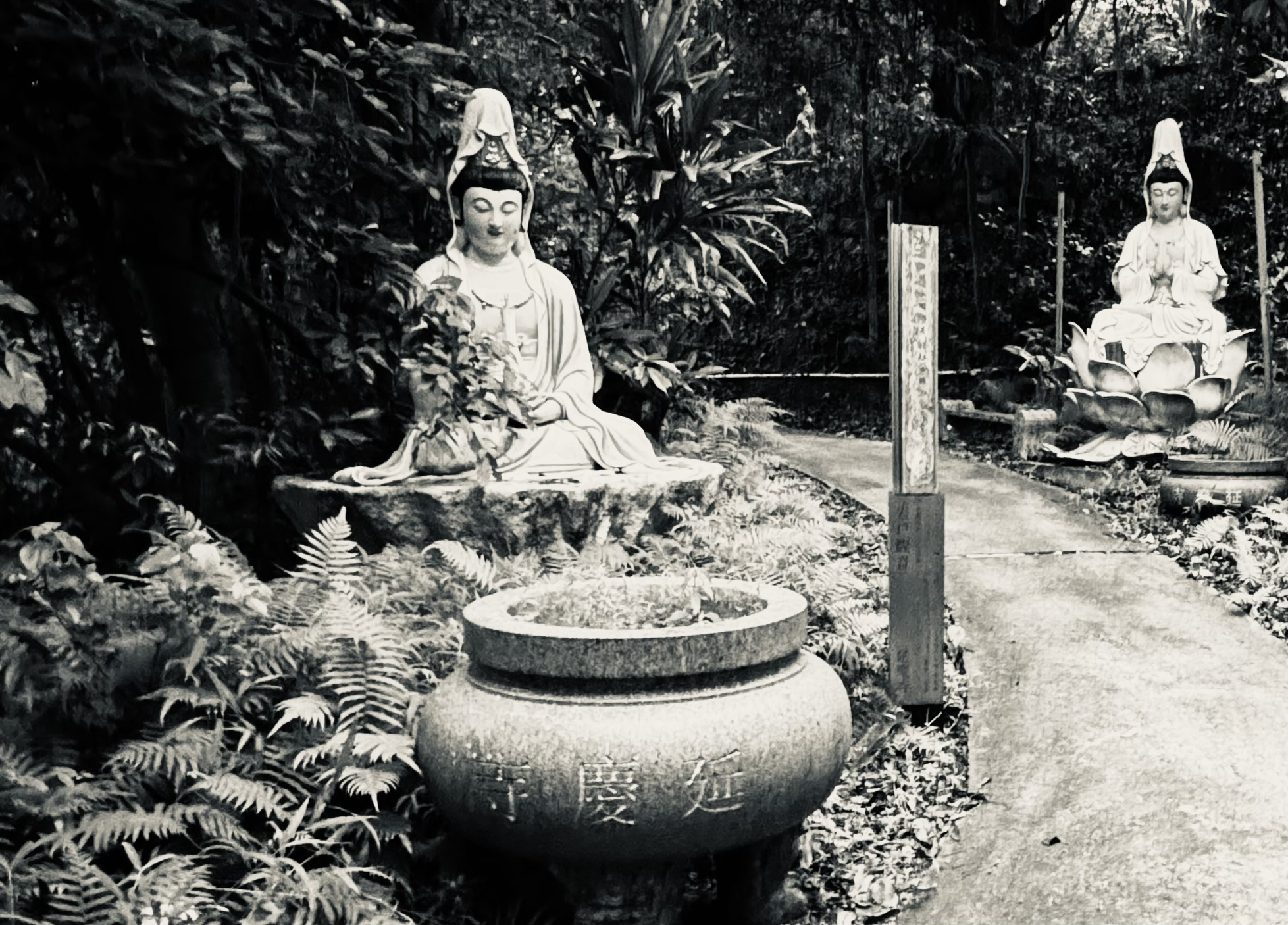
Walking path to Yin Hing Monastery with Bodhisattva statues

Luk Wu, together with Ngong Ping, Keung Shan, Tei Tong Tsai and Man Cheung Po are considered as the five major Buddhist sites of Lantau Island, hosting numerous temples and gardens.

=== Luk Wu Chin She ===
The oldest temple in the village was built as early as 1883 during the early days of British rule of Hong Kong.

Luk Wu Chin She (鹿湖精舍) is located just above the Deer Pond area and was founded originally as a Taoist Temple.

=== Yin Hing Monastery ===
Yin Hing Monastery (延慶寺) is a relatively recent addition to the monastic community of Luk Wu as it was completed in 1966.

It features a brightly-coloured framework and is protected by two green guardian lions. Yin Hing Monastery was converted into a columbarium after it was sold to a private developer.

=== Gak Su Temple ===
The first of four buildings (that today belong to Gak Su Temple) was donated in 1997 to Su Bong Zen Monastery that manages and maintains this location. Meditation retreats have been held here ever since, providing training for monks and nuns, novices and laypeople alike.

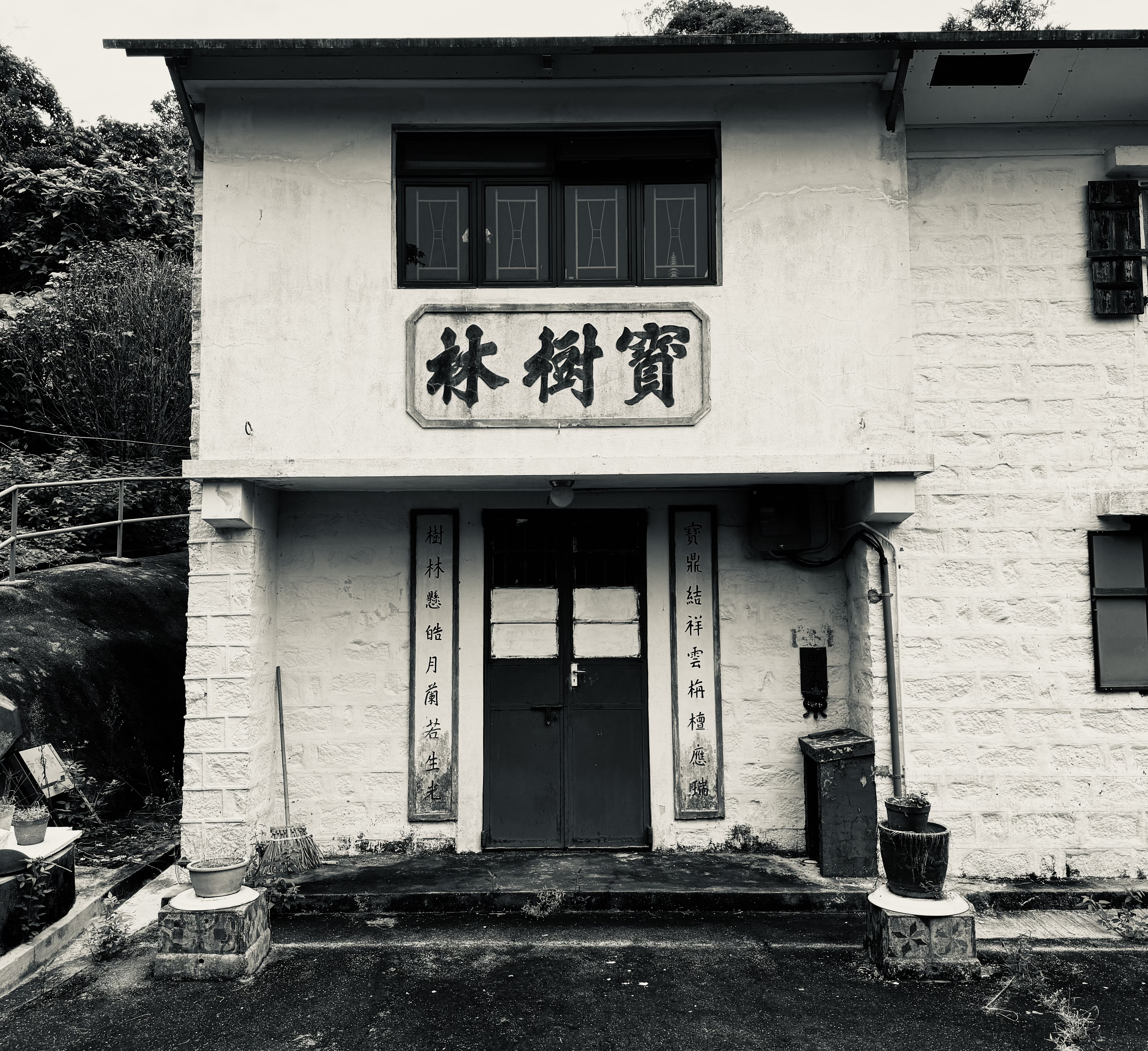
One of the several buildings that are managed by and belong to Gak Su Temple

Over the years, three additional nearby locations (Sim Pak Lam, Jing Yu and Lotus Shelter) have become part of Gak Su Temple, providing facilities for spiritual practice as well as lodging for retreat participants from all over the world.

=== Amitabha Buddha Temple (Project) ===
In 2019 Plum Village Hong Kong received a smaller house in Luk Wu donated by three venerable nuns. The building was built around 1950s and is currently undergoing extensive renovation.
