= Pak Kong =

Village in Hong Kong

Coordinates: 22.379172°N 114.258413°E

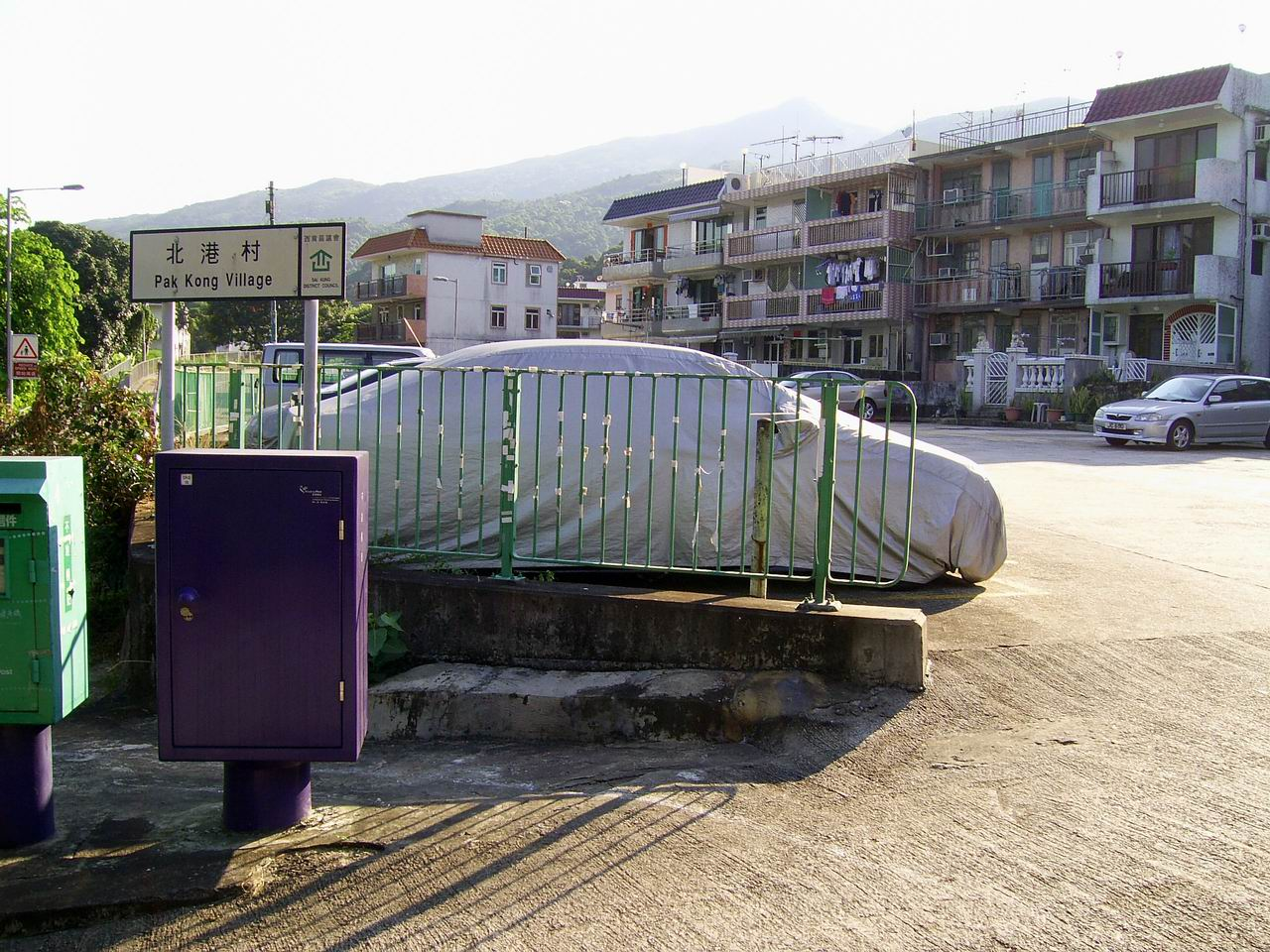
Pak Kong Village.

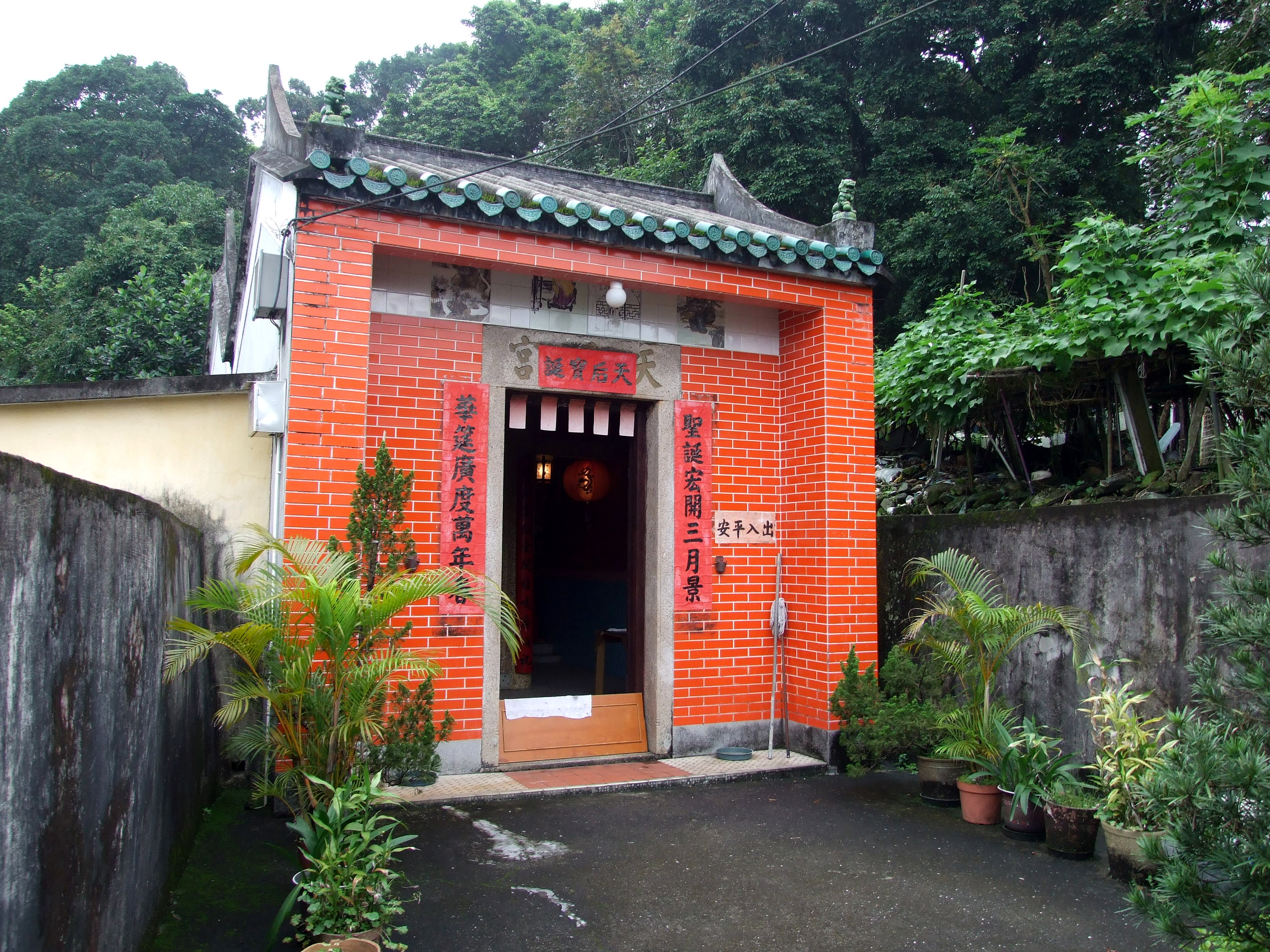
Tin Hau temple, Pak Kong

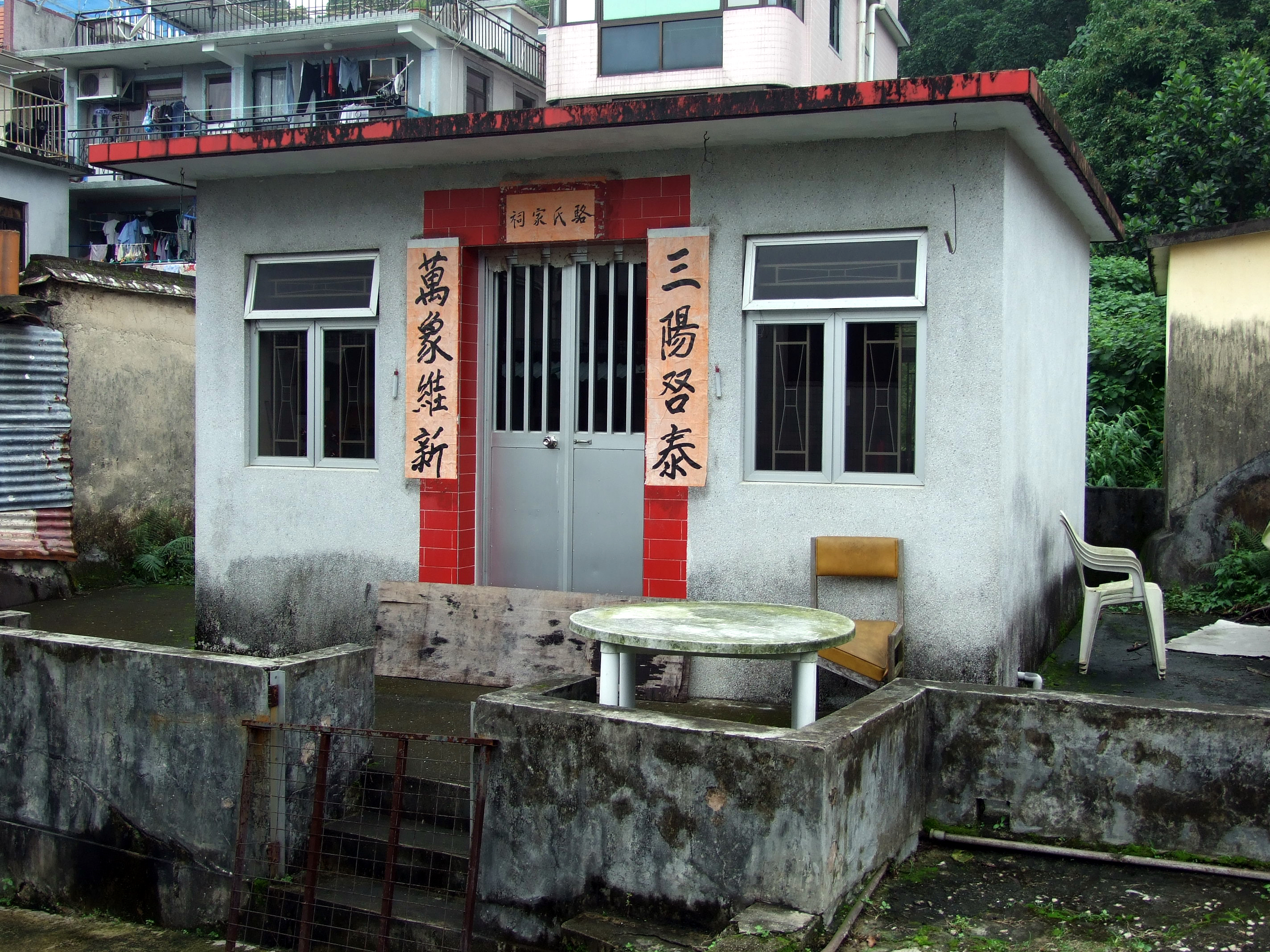
Lok Ancestral Hall (駱氏家祠) in Pak Kong.

Pak Kong (Chinese: 北港) is a village in Sai Kung Peninsula, Hong Kong.

Nearby villages include Pak Kong Au, Mau Ping New Village and Wong Chuk Shan New Village.

== Administration ==
Pak Kong is a recognized village under the New Territories Small House Policy.

== History ==
Pak Kong was first settled by tenants of the Wong clan, in the mid-16th century. It is a multi-surname village, with the clans resident there today being the Lok (駱), Cheng (鄭), Lei (李), Lau (劉), and Leung (梁).

At the time of the 1911 census, the population of Pak Kong was 190. The number of males was 75.

== Features ==
There is a Tin Hau Temple in Pak Kong.

== Transportation ==
Pak Kong is connected to Hiram's Highway via Pak Kong Road.

The Pak Kong Ancient Trail (北港古道) is a hiking trail connecting Pak Kong to Mau Ping, uphill within Ma On Shan Country Park, and further to Sha Tin.
