= Sha Kok Mei =

Village in Hong Kong

Coordinates: 22.387431°N 114.269304°E

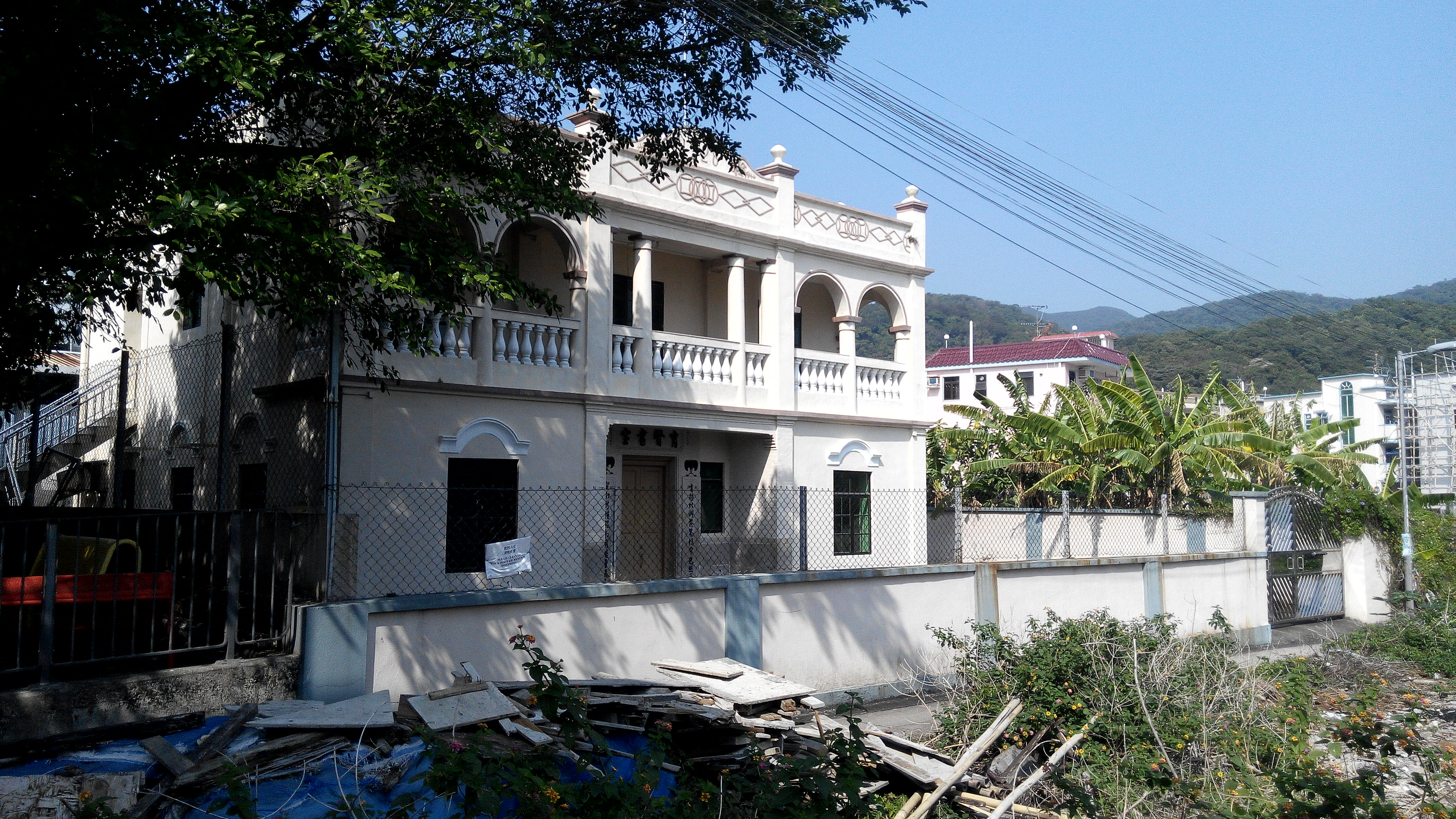
Yuk Yin Study Hall in Sha Kok Mei in January 2015

Sha Kok Mei (Chinese: 沙角尾) is a village in Sai Kung Peninsula, Hong Kong.

== Administration ==
Sha Kok Mei, including Ngau Liu (牛寮), is a recognized village under the New Territories Small House Policy.

== History ==
At the time of the 1911 census, the population of Sha Kok Mei was 346. The number of males was 152.
