= Pak Tai Temple =

Pak Tai Temple may refer to

- Sam Tai Tsz Temple and Pak Tai Temple, Wan Chai, Hong Kong
- Wan Chai Pak Tai Temple, Hong Kong
- Yuk Hui Temple, also known as Pak Tai Temple
