= Longmu =

Goddess in Chinese Mythology

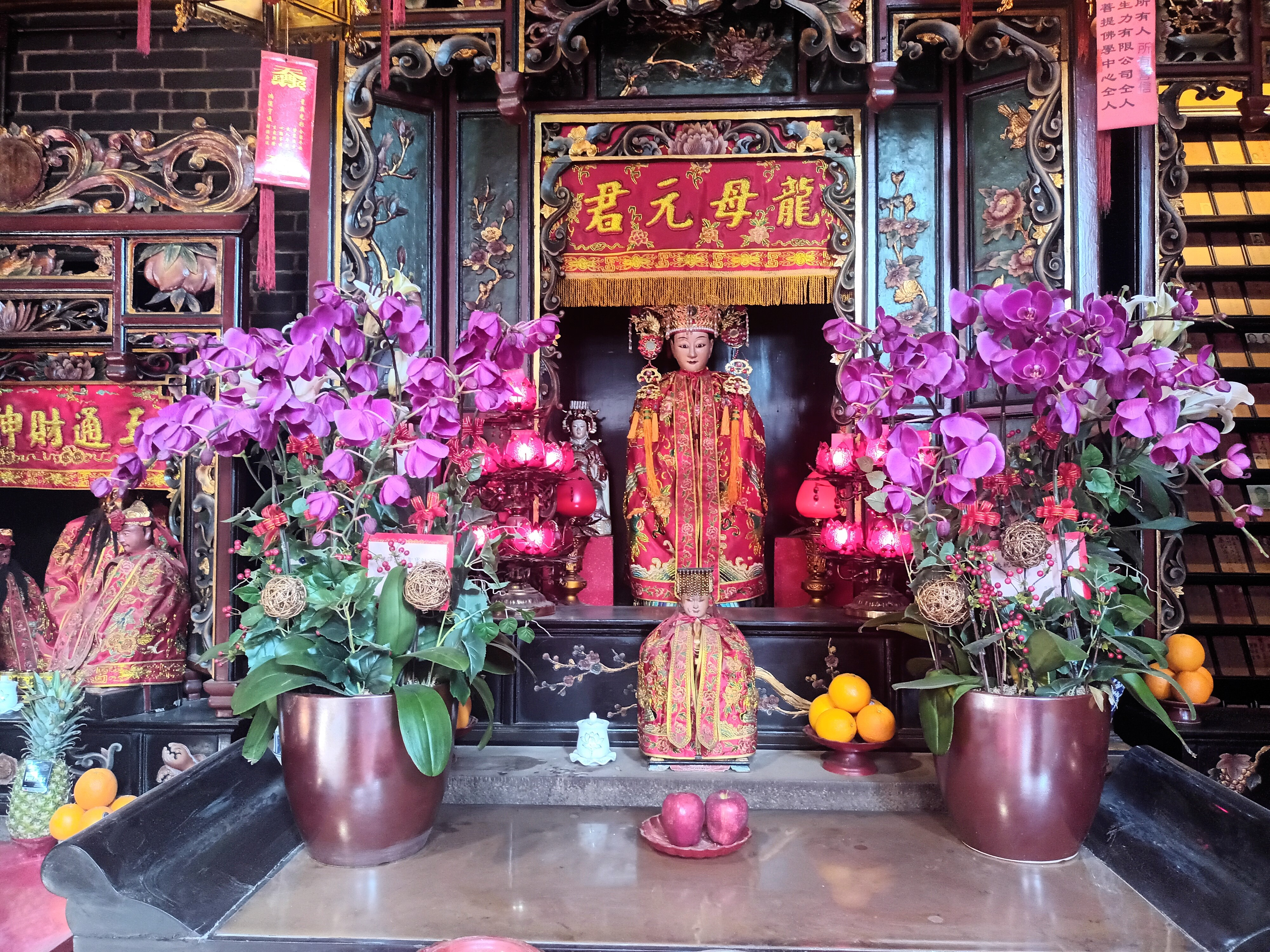
Statue of Longmu in Tam Kung Temple, Shau Kei Wan, Hong Kong.

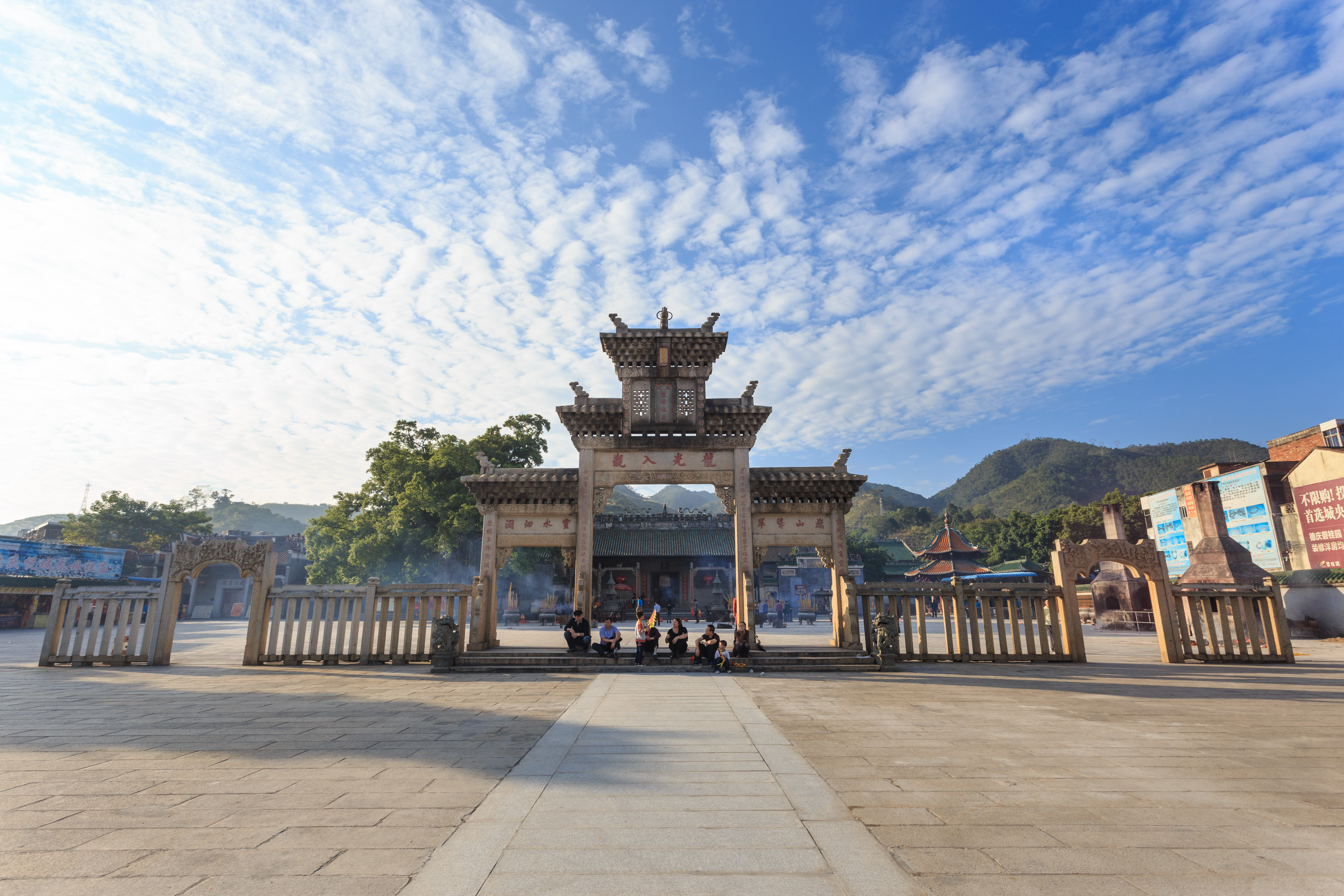
Longmu Temple of Yuecheng in Deqing County.

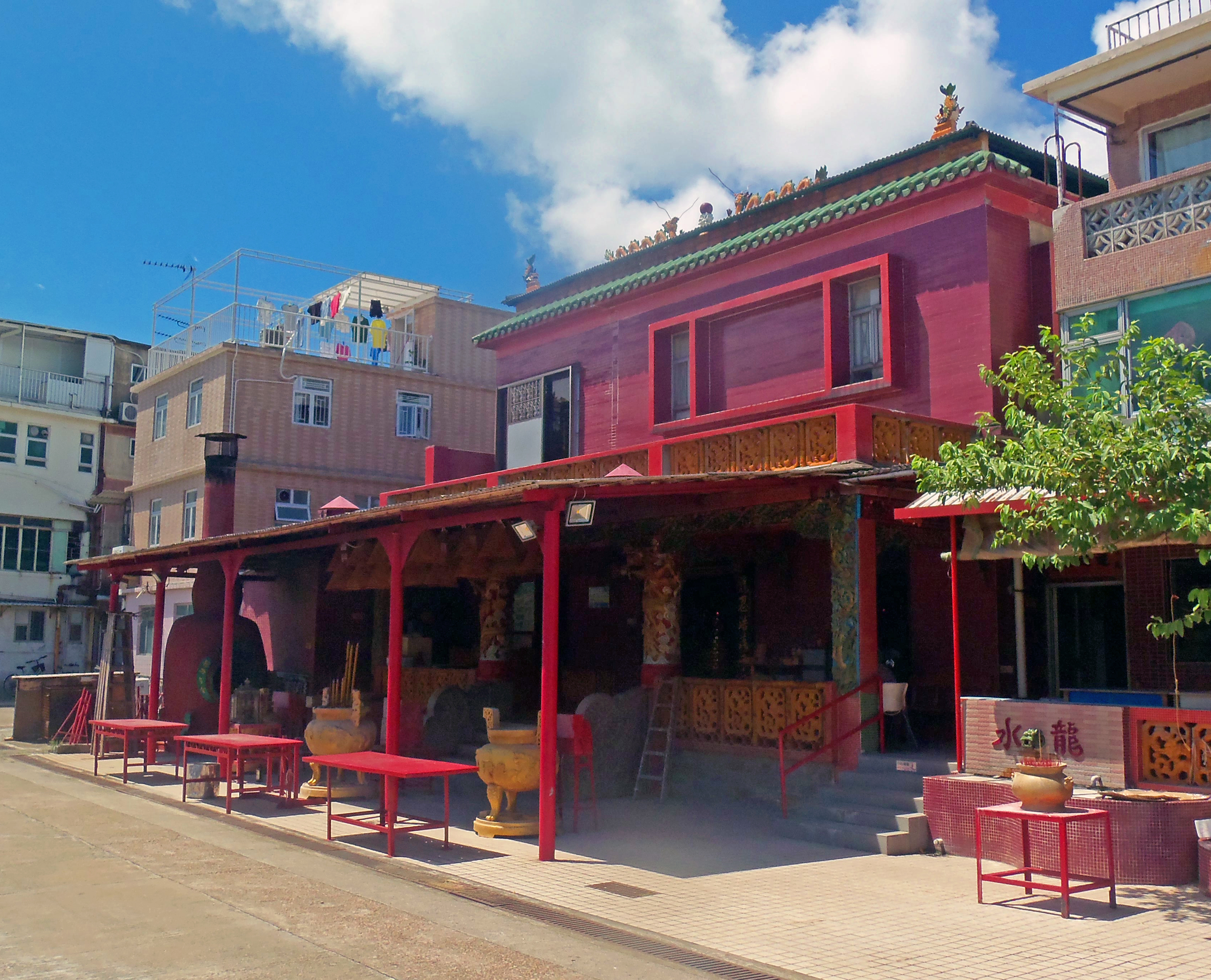
Lung Mo Temple on Peng Chau, an island of Hong Kong.

In Chinese mythology, Longmu (simplified Chinese: 龙母; traditional Chinese: 龍母; lit. 'Mother of Dragons'), transliterated as Lung Mo in Cantonese, was a Chinese woman who was deified as a goddess after raising five infant dragons. Longmu and her dragons developed a strong bond and have thus become examples of filial devotion and parental love, important virtues in Chinese culture.

== Legend ==
Longmu's historic name was Wen Shi (溫氏). She was born in 290 BC (during the Qin dynasty) in Guangdong province, near the Xi River (西江). Her family's ancestral home was in the Teng County (藤縣) in Guangxi province. She was the second of three daughters of Wen Tianrui (溫天瑞) and Liang Shi (梁氏).

Wen Shi frequently went to the Xi River to fish and wash clothes for her family. On one such errand, she found a large smooth white stone along the banks of the river. She took the beautiful stone home, but later discovered that the stone was actually an egg, from which hatched five baby snakes (an alternate version says one). Wen Shi's family was poor, but Wen Shi saved the best food she had for her baby snakes and fed them by hand. As the snakes grew, they helped Wen Shi catch fish at the Xi River. The snakes were natural swimmers and became very good at catching fish.

The snakes eventually matured into five powerful dragons. In Chinese culture, dragons are considered spirits of water and have the power to control the weather. During a drought, therefore, Wen Shi asked her dragon children to summon the rain for her village. When rain came and ended the drought, the grateful villagers gave Wen Shi the name "Mother of Dragons" (龍母) or "Divine Human" (神人).

Qin Shihuang, the emperor of the Qin dynasty, received word of Wen Shi and her dragons. The Emperor sent her gifts of gold and jade and requested her presence at Xianyang, the imperial capital city near the Yellow River, far to the north. By this time, Wen Shi was an elderly woman in frail health. Her adult dragons feared for her safety and did not want her to travel so far from her village. Wen Shi boarded a boat to comply with the Emperor's commandment, but her dragons hid under the boat and dragged the boat backward so that the boat could never pass Guilin. Eventually, the frustrated imperial officials relented and allowed Wen Shi to remain home.

After Wen Shi died, the dragons were overwhelmed by sadness and took human form, becoming known as the Five Scholars (五秀才), who buried her on the northern side of Zhu Mountain (珠山).

== Worship ==
Everyone who heard the story of Longmu was touched by the filial devotion of the dragons. During the early Han dynasty, the Xiaotong Temple (孝通廟), later known as the Longmu Ancestral Temple (龍母祖廟), was built in her honor. The temple is in Yuecheng (悅城鎮) in Deqing County of Guangdong province. It features calligraphy dedicated to the goddess written by the Emperor Hong Wu of the Ming dynasty. The temple remains very popular and has been renovated 13 times over the centuries, most recently in 1905-1912 and 1985.

Another temple dedicated to Longmu is the Baisha Temple in Zhaoqing on the northern bank of the Xi River, also in Guangdong province. The temple was built in 1587, but it is not as well preserved as the Xiaotong Temple. The city declared the temple a cultural site in 1982.

Longmu's festival is in the first week of the fifth month of the Chinese lunar calendar. She is a patron goddess of parents and children and remains a popular deity throughout China.

=== Hong Kong ===
Lung Mo Temples in Hong Kong are dedicated to Longmu ("Lung Mo" in Cantonese).

Note: A territory-wide grade reassessment of historic buildings is ongoing. The grades listed in the table are based on these updates (8 June 2023). The temples with a "Not listed" status in the table below are not graded and do not appear in the list of historic buildings considered for grading.

Location	Notes	Status	References	Photographs
Part of the Yuk Hui Temple aka. Wan Chai Pak Tai Temple. Lung On Street, Wan Chai 22.272954°N 114.173707°E	Hall of Lung Mo (龍母殿) While the main building of the Yuk Hui Temple is dedicated to the worship of Pak Tai, the Hall of Lung Mo is attached to the main building on its left. It houses the deities Lung Mo, Fat Mo (佛母) and Tin Hau. It was built in the 1910s or earlier. The Lung Mo Festival (龍母誕) is celebrated on the 8th day of the 5th lunar month.	Declared (Pak Tai Temple)		
No. 49 Ha Heung Road, To Kwa Wan 22.317236°N 114.188967°E	Lung Mo Temple (龍母廟) Adjacent to the Tin Hau Temple, To Kwa Wan (土瓜灣天后廟). Built in 1885. The temple houses the statue of Lung Mo, which was transferred here in 1964, when the temple at Hoi Sham Island was demolished following land reclamation. Managed by the Chinese Temples Committee. The interior of the temple can be explored with Google Street View.	Grade III		
Eastern edge of Lam Tin Park, Kwun Tong District 22.31044°N 114.24186°E	Lung Mo Temple (龍母廟) Part of the Dei Mu Yun Gwan Temple complex (地母元君廟)	Not listed		
Lo Wai (老圍), Tsuen Wan District 22.384143°N 114.125363°E	Lung Mo Temple, Tsuen Wan (上角山龍母佛堂, 荃灣龍母廟)	Not listed		
Peng Chau 22.28510°N 114.04014°E	Lung Mo Temple (坪洲龍母廟) aka. Yuet Lung Sing Yuen (悅龍聖苑)	Not listed		
