= Yuk Hui Temple =

Taoist temple in Cheung Chau, Hong Kong

Coordinates: 22.212382°N 114.027852°E

- 長洲北帝廟/玉虛宮
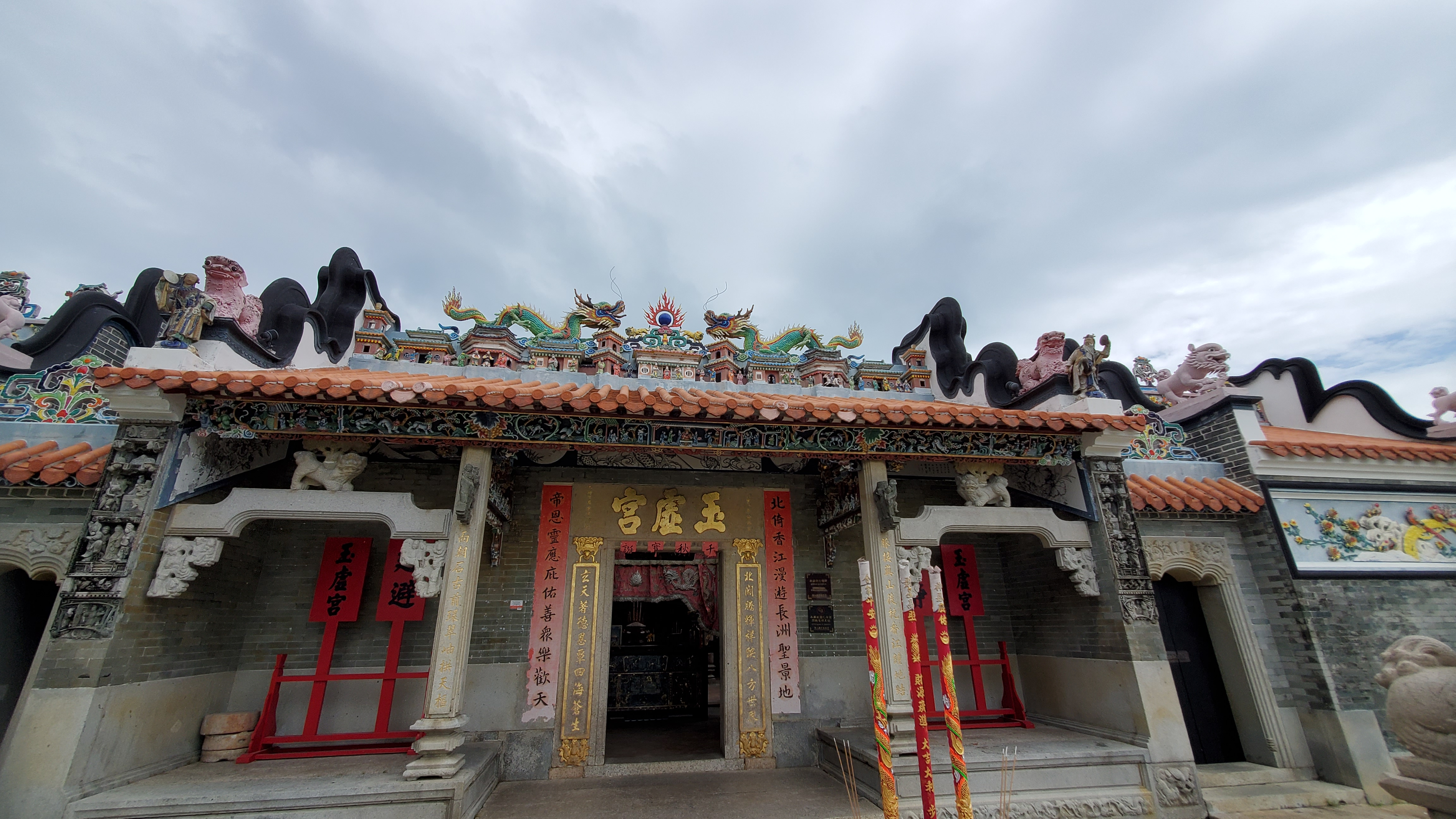

Religion
- Affiliation: Taoism
- Region: Cheung Chau,
- Deity: Primary: Pak Tai; Secondary: Guanyin; Tai Sui; Tin Hau; The old man under the moon Tu Di Gong
- Festivals: Pak Tai Festival; Cheung Chau Bun Festival
- Governing body: Chinese Temples Committee

Location
- Municipality: Pak She Street, Tung Wan
- Country: Hong Kong
- Interactive map of Yuk Hui Temple

Architecture
- Style: Traditional Chinese Style
- Established: 1783

Yuk Hui Temple
- Traditional Chinese: 玉虛宮
- Literal meaning: Palace of the Jade Void
- Yale Romanization: Yuhk hēui gūng
- Jyutping: Juk^{6} heoi^{1} gung^{1}

Yuk Hui Temple (Chinese: 玉虛宮) also known as Pak Tai Temple (北帝廟), is a Taoist temple located on the island of Cheung Chau, Hong Kong. The temple address is Pak She Street, Tung Wan, Cheung Chau.

== Introduction ==
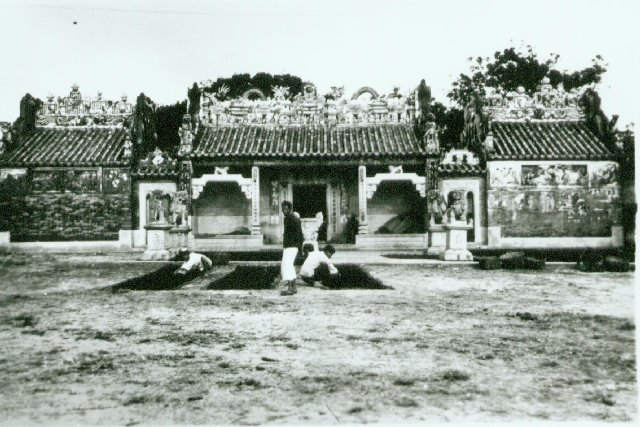
Yuk Hui Temple in the 1930s.

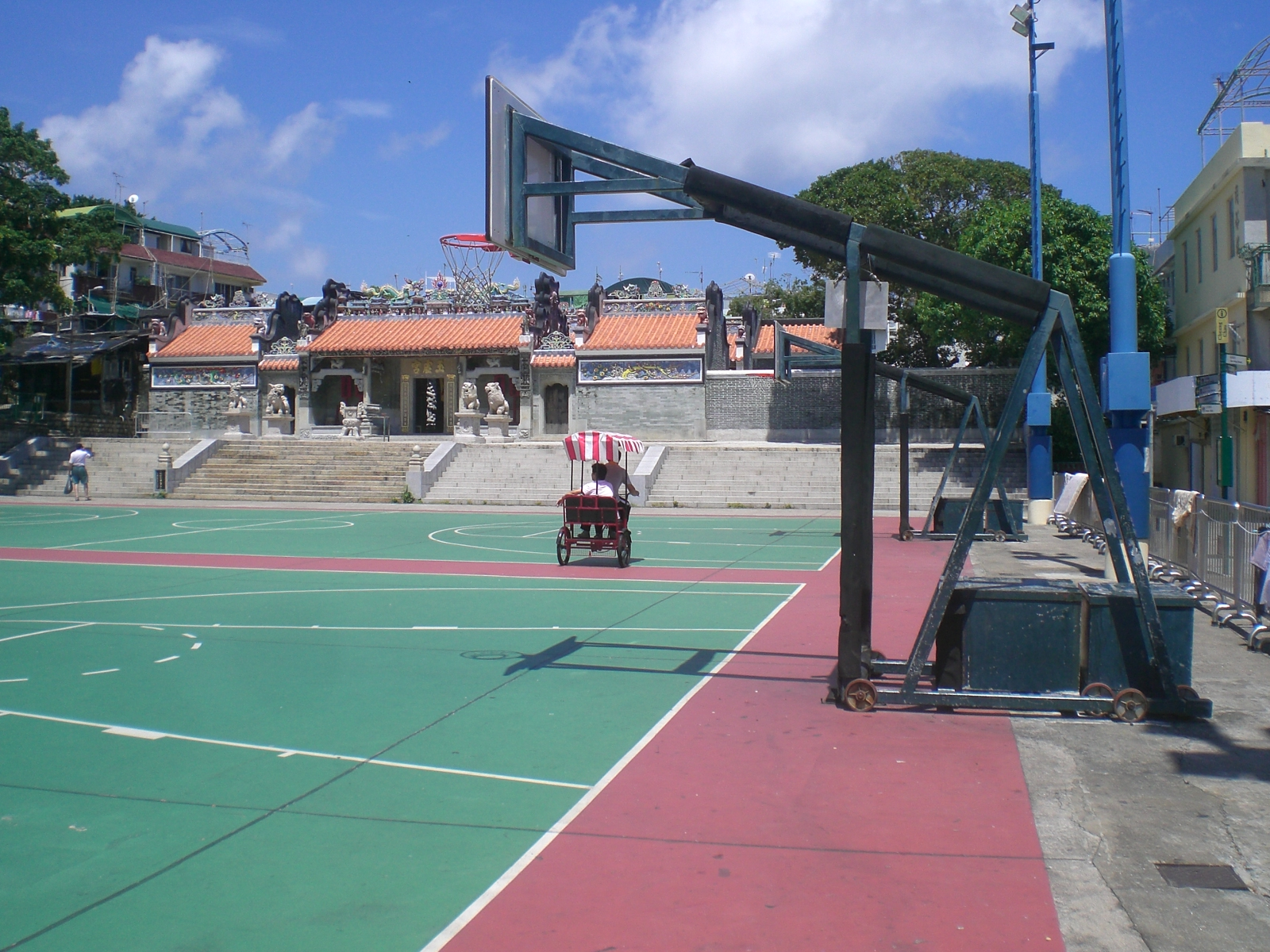
Yuk Hui Temple in 2008.

The temple is listed as a Grade I historic building. It is most famous for the Cheung Chau Bun Festival, which is a Taoist ceremony held annually on Cheung Chau island. The festival takes place on the 8th day of the fourth month of the lunar calendar, which occurs usually in April or May. The festival lasts for seven days. It attracts many tourists and Pak Tai worshipers.

== History ==
The first settlers in Cheung Chau were fishermen from Huizhou, Guangzhou and Chaozhou. They worshiped the Taoist Sea God, Pak Tai, as their patron deity. In 1777, there was a severe outbreak of plague in Cheung Chau. It is said that when a Huizhounese brought a statue of Pak Tai to the island the pestilence miraculously disappeared. In gratitude for Pak Tai's blessing, the residents, led by Mr. Lam Yuk-mo, built Yuk Hui Temple, which was completed in 1783. Another story states that the statue was discovered by a fisherman, instead of being brought to the island by the Huizhouese.

== Administration ==
In its early days, the temple was voluntarily managed and renovated by local residents. Then in 1929, the Chinese Temples Committee began to administer the temple. There have been several major renovations over the centuries, notably in 1822, 1838, 1858, 1903–1904, and 1989. The latest one was started in 1999 and finished in 2003, which cost (HKD)$13 million. Since its establishment, a range of antiques from the local community have been donated to the temple. Yuk Hui Temple is administered by the Chinese Temples Committee.

== Deities ==
The main deity of Yuk Hui Temple is Pak Tai, alternatively known as Yuen Tin Sheung Tai (玄天上帝), the Supreme Emperor of the Northern Heaven or the Mysterious Heaven. In Taoist mythology, he was once a prince of the Shang dynasty, and then appointed by Jade Emperor to fight the Demon King during the fall of the dynasty. He triumphed in the combat even though the Demon King conjured out a grey tortoise and a gigantic serpent for help. After this victory, Pak Tai was awarded the title of Yuen Tin Sheung Tai and is worshipped for his power, courage and devotion. The portrays of the tortoise and the snake under his feet symbolize that the good always prevails against the evil

The temple also houses Guanyin (Goddess of Mercy), Tai Sui (the Sixty Gods of Time), Tin Hau, The old man under the moon (the God of Matchmaking) and Tu Di Gong (a local earth god).

Local residents and the fishing folks around the waters of the island are the major worshippers of the temple. Islanders would come to the temple during various festivals to pray for blessing or to present their gratitude, especially fishermen. They would come to invoke for an auspicious date and a great catch before setting sail and to thank for Pak Tai's blessing after their return.

The two busiest times of the temple during the year are:

1. the Pak Tai Festival on the 3rd day of the 3rd Lunar Month;
2. the Bun Festival- commonly known as the Tai Ping Ching Chiu, the 8th day in the 4th Lunar Month.

== Cultural and historical relics ==
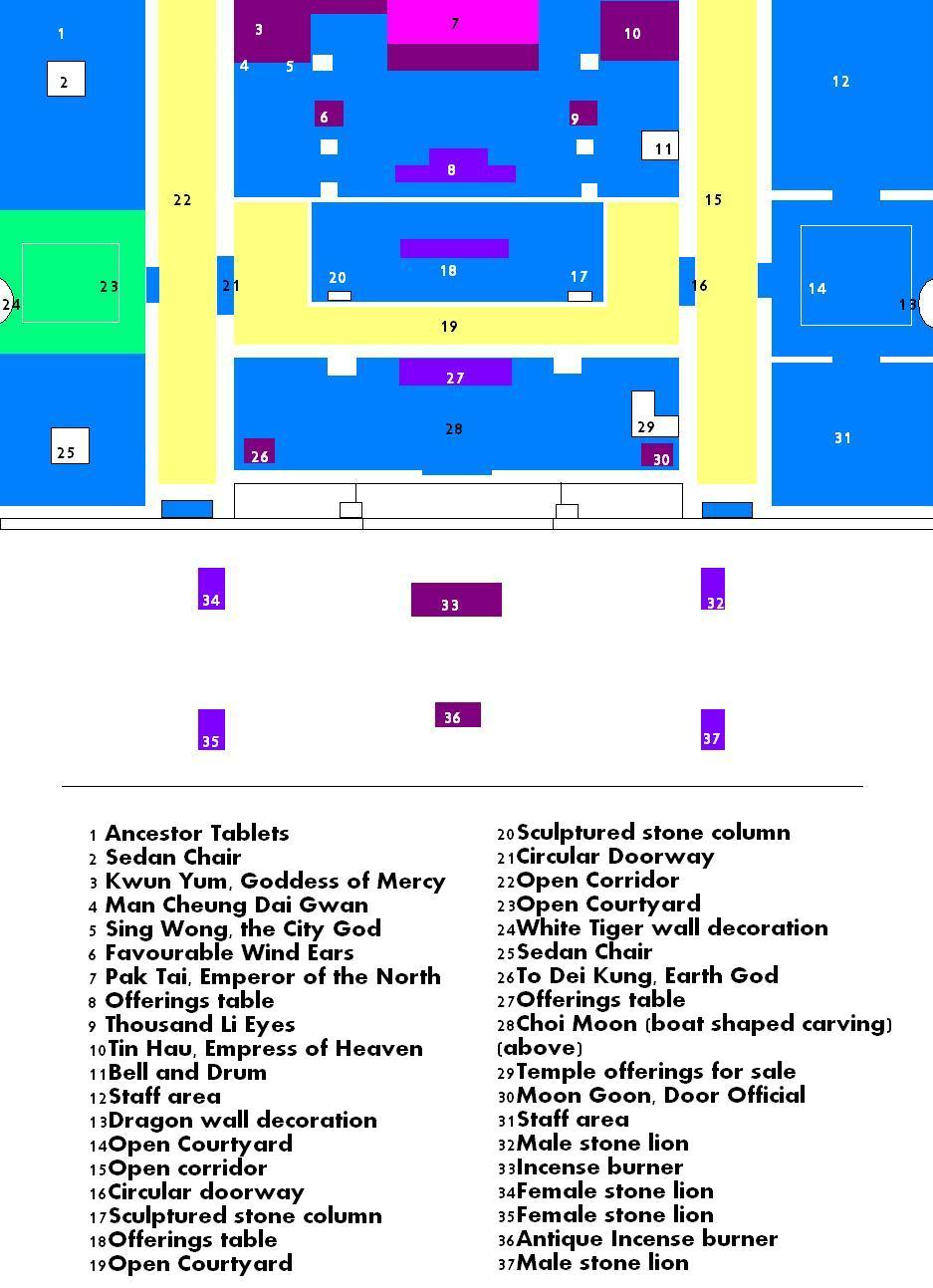
Floor plan of the temple.

=== Iron sword ===
The iron sword is reputed to be the most significant treasure in Yuk Hui Temple. It was made in the Song dynasty about 800 years ago. Allegedly, it was thrown into the sea by a general at the time of Emperor Bing of Song to calm a great storm. Years later it was dredged up by the local fisherman and presented to the deity.

There are two legends about the iron sword's whereabouts worth mentioning: The first recounts that during the Japanese occupation, a Japanese soldier took away the sword and accounted it as his own. He soon died mysteriously. One of the soldier's friends was afraid that taking the sword was the reason for this, so he decided to return it to the temple. The second states that the iron sword was stolen in the early 1970s. In order to find the sword, villagers used "bwabway" (筊杯), a tool for seeking divine direction in Chinese folk religion, to ask for Pai Tai's help. According to Pai Tai's direction, the iron sword was in the east and would automatically show up soon. Police later found it abandoned in East Kowloon district. A newspaper cutting covering this incident is now reserved in the temple. ).

=== Golden crown ===
The golden crown worn by the main Pak Tai statue is made of 20-ounce gold and hung with pearls. It was donated by Madam Chung, a worshipper in Cheung Chau island, to commemorate the visit of Princess Margaret and the Earl of Snowdon to the temple in 1966.

=== Other antiques ===
Other antiques include:

- A wooden sedan chair made in 1894, which was used to carry the image of the Pak Tai;
- a pair of incense burners which was donated by the Chinese Temples Committee in 1960 in memory of the visit of Mr. Burgess, the former government administrating officer, in 1959;
- two stone pillars in a shape of two dragons from two gigantic pieces of solid granite, which were carved out in 1903;
- a stone caldron made in 1894, and
- a bronze bell made in 1784.

== Architecture ==
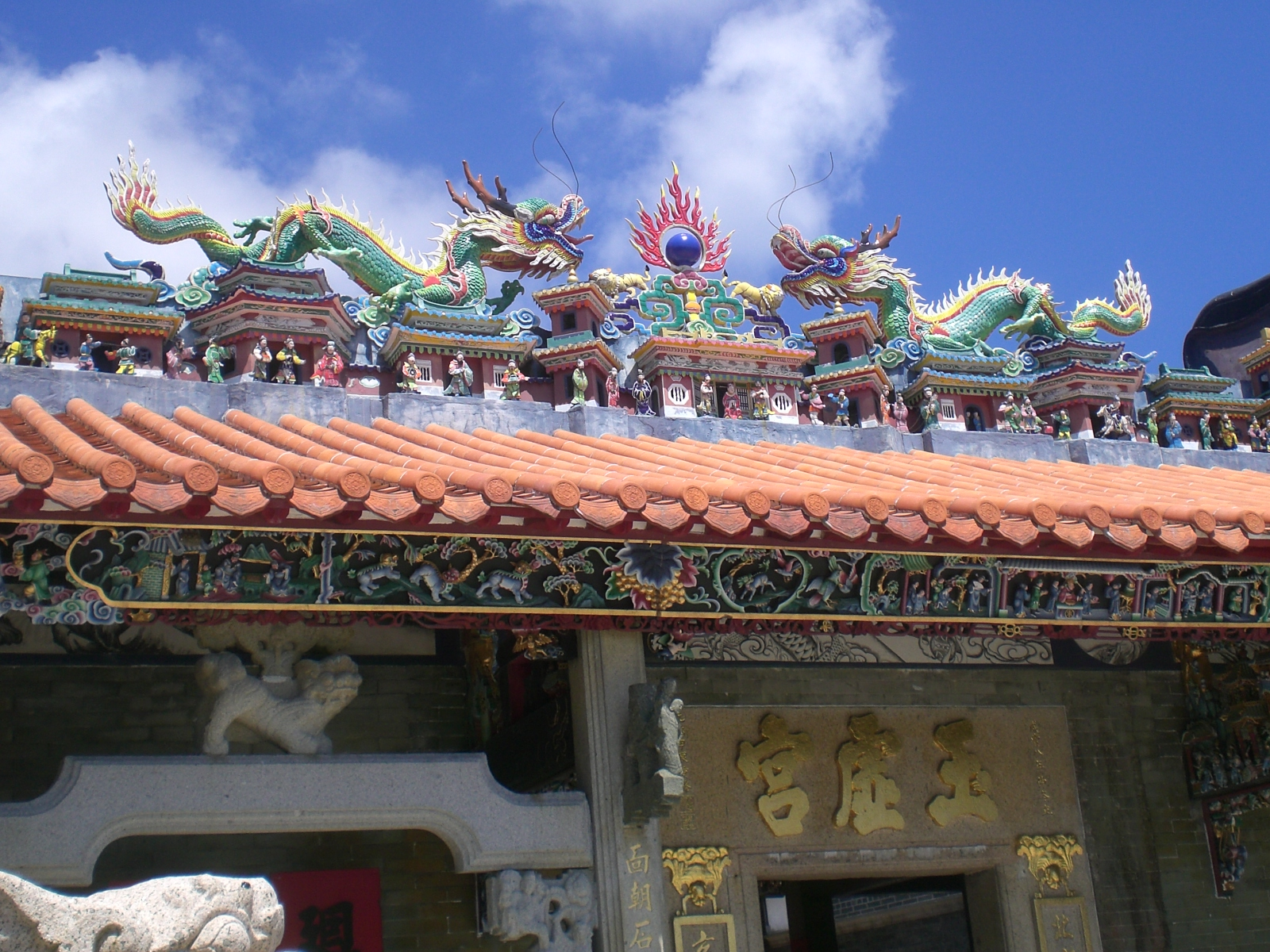
Roof decoration.

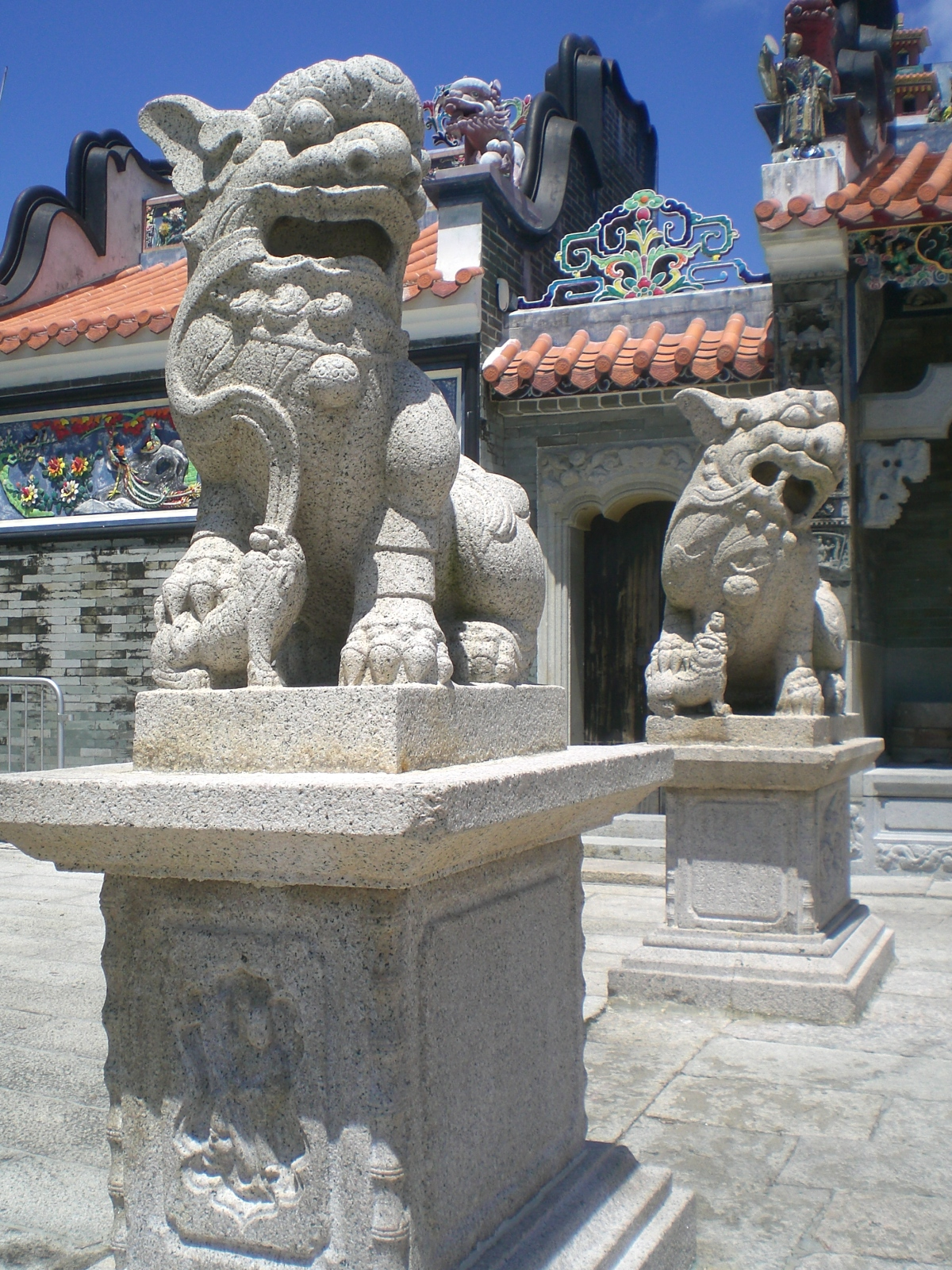
Stone lion sculptures outside the temple.

The building of the grand temple takes into account the spiritual location or 'Feng Shui'. The temple is considered to have good 'Feng Shui' since it is located on the pulse of the dragon, which stretch to the island from Lantau Island nearby, with the sea in front and the mountains of Hong Kong Island protecting from behind). Allegedly, this is also why Yuk Hui Temple has been the most popular temple on the island for a long time. The temple is in traditional Chinese style with a roof of detailed green concave tiles, ridges and ceramic figurines. Figures of stone lions can be found all around the architecture and this temple has the most stone lions (4) among Hong Kong temples.

=== Structure ===
The primary entrance leads to the main hall, which holds the Pak Tai statue. There are two smaller halls on each side of the main hall. The images of a white tiger and a blue dragon in the left-side hall and the right-side hall respectively represent power. The two side halls help to improve the temple's 'Feng Shui'.

An ancient drum and bell can be seen on the left of the temple's entrance to drive away evil spirits and to attract the attention of the gods. It is believed that the writings surrounding the bell area will be heard by the gods in heaven.

=== Stone lions ===
At the main entrance, there are four lively stone sculptures of lions playing a ball game. Two of the lions have balls in their mouths and it is said that unmarried girls who can remove the balls will eventually marry a prince. The two lions on the left side of the entrance are lionesses with a small cub beneath their paws, while those on the right are males with a ball beneath their feet. It is believed that milk is contained in the ball for humans to drink.

=== The stone pillars ===
In the centre of the hall are two stone pillars carved from a solid piece of granite in the shape of dragons. They are imperial dragons as they have five claws on each foot while ordinary ones have only four. A ball can be seen in the dragon's mouth which is known as 'The Pearl of the Dragon'. According to Chinese culture, it is believed to be a sign of good luck if the dragon releases the ball.

There are some square stone pillars which carries the message that can be translated as: 'Pi tai will look after Cheung Chau and will bring calm seas and good weather'.

== Cheung Chau Bun Festival ==
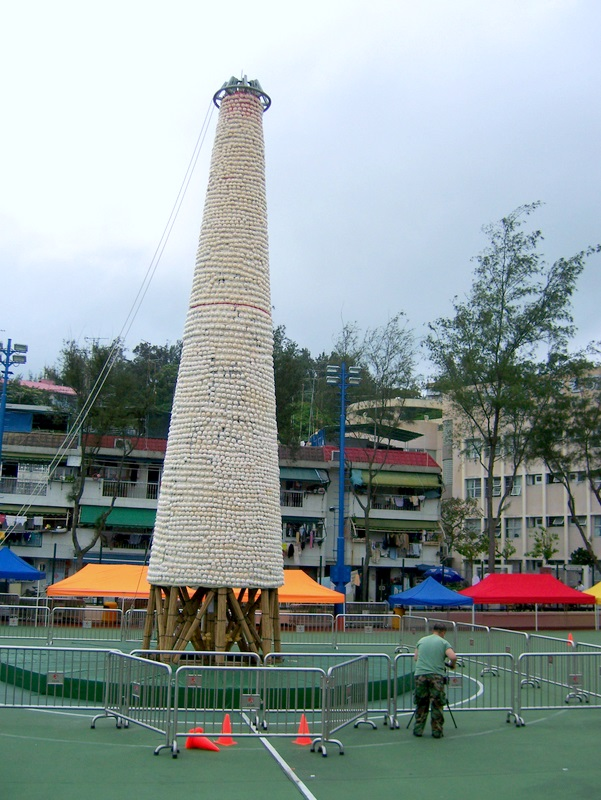
Cheung Chau Bun Festival.

Cheung Chau Bun Festival is a traditional Taoist festival that takes place in and around the Yuk Hui Temple on Cheung Chau

It is staged every year (usually in late April or early May) to mark the eighth day of the fourth moon in the Chinese calendar. The event draws tens of thousands of tourists from overseas and local areas and is promoted by the Hong Kong Tourism Board.

The name of the festival comes from its main attraction; the 'bun snatching race' where brave individuals climb up 'Bun Mountains' or 'Bun Towers' and strip them down of buns.

== Gallery ==
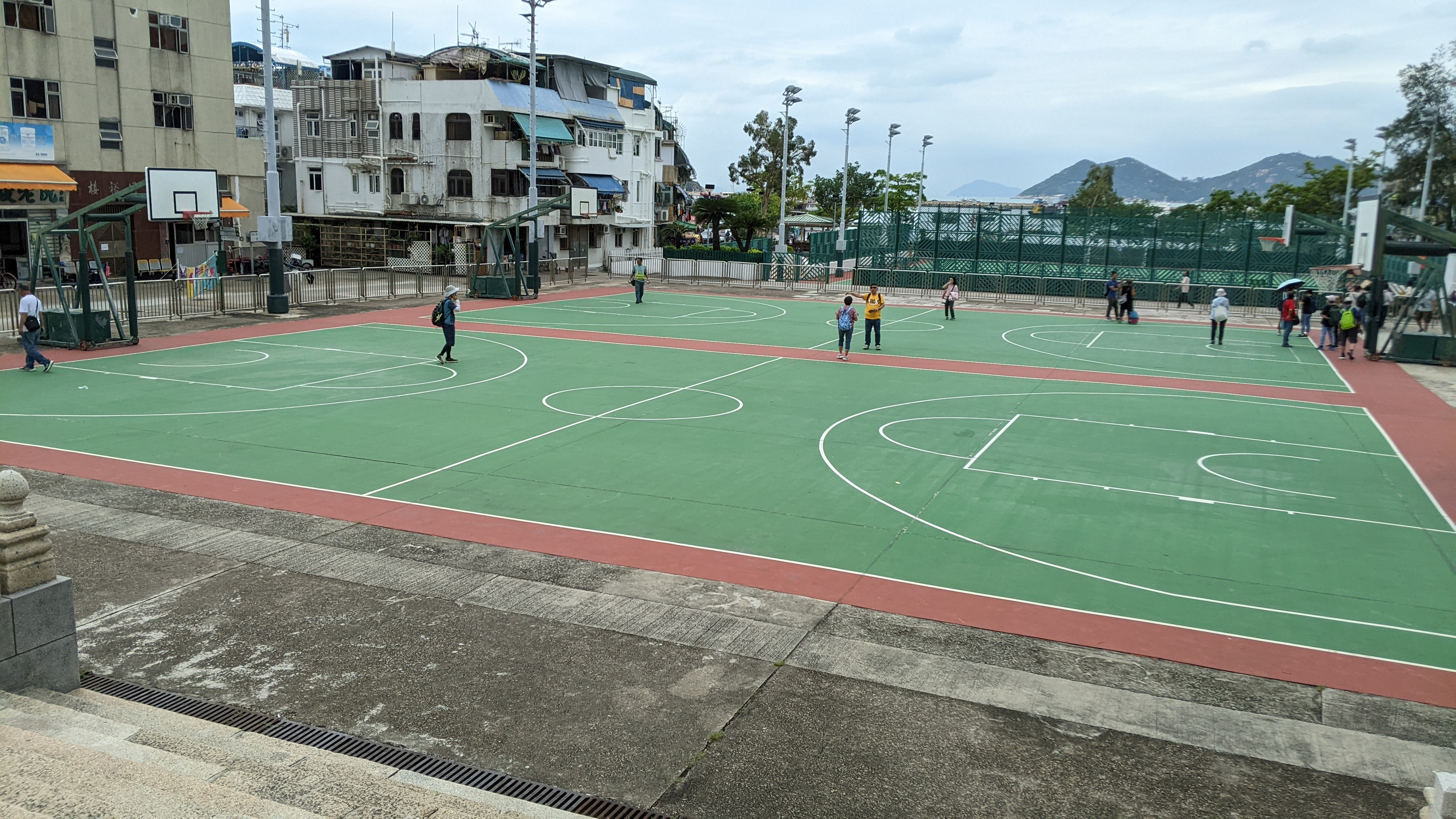
The playground in front of the temple where the annual bun snatching competition is held

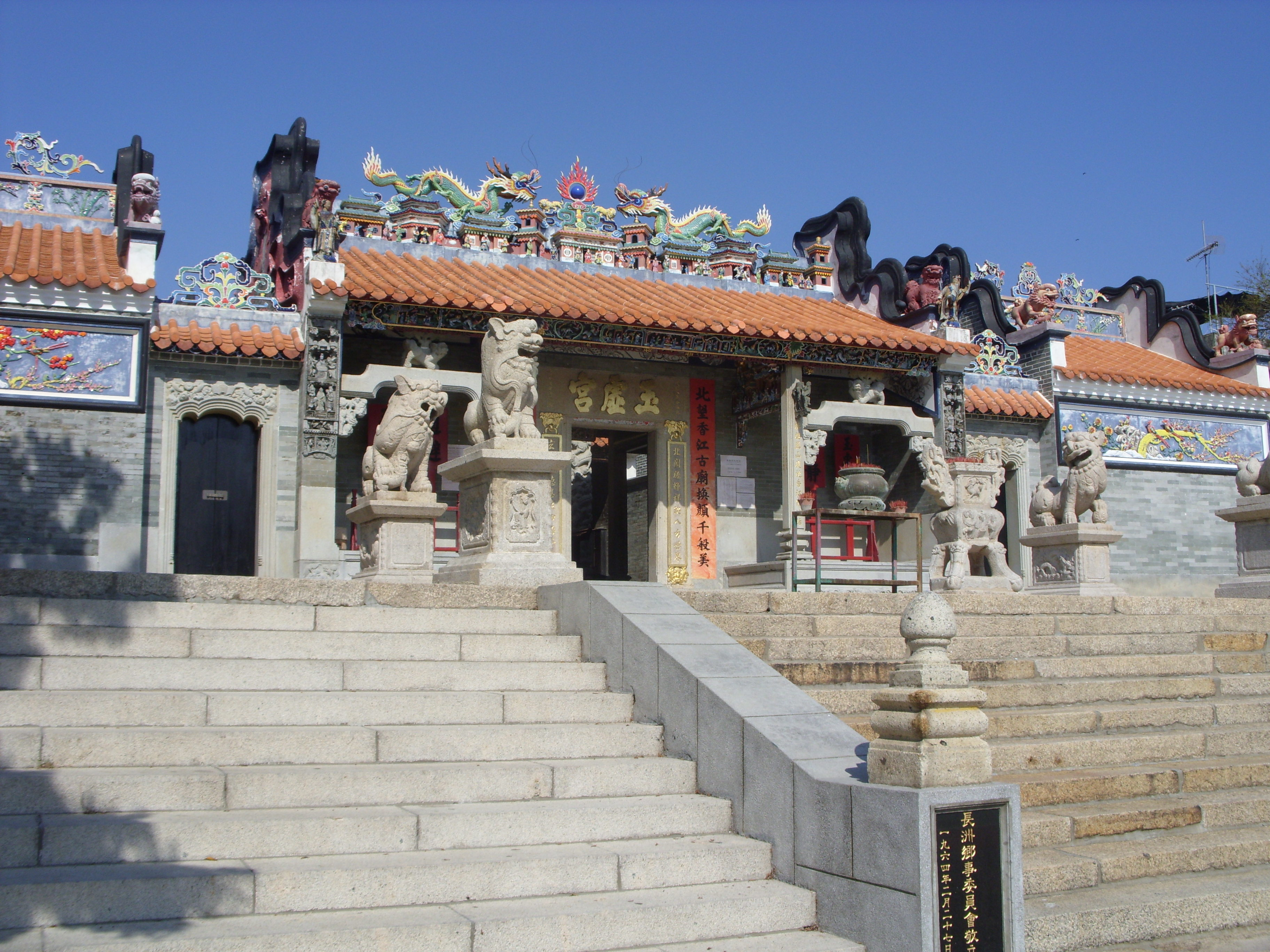
A front view of the temple

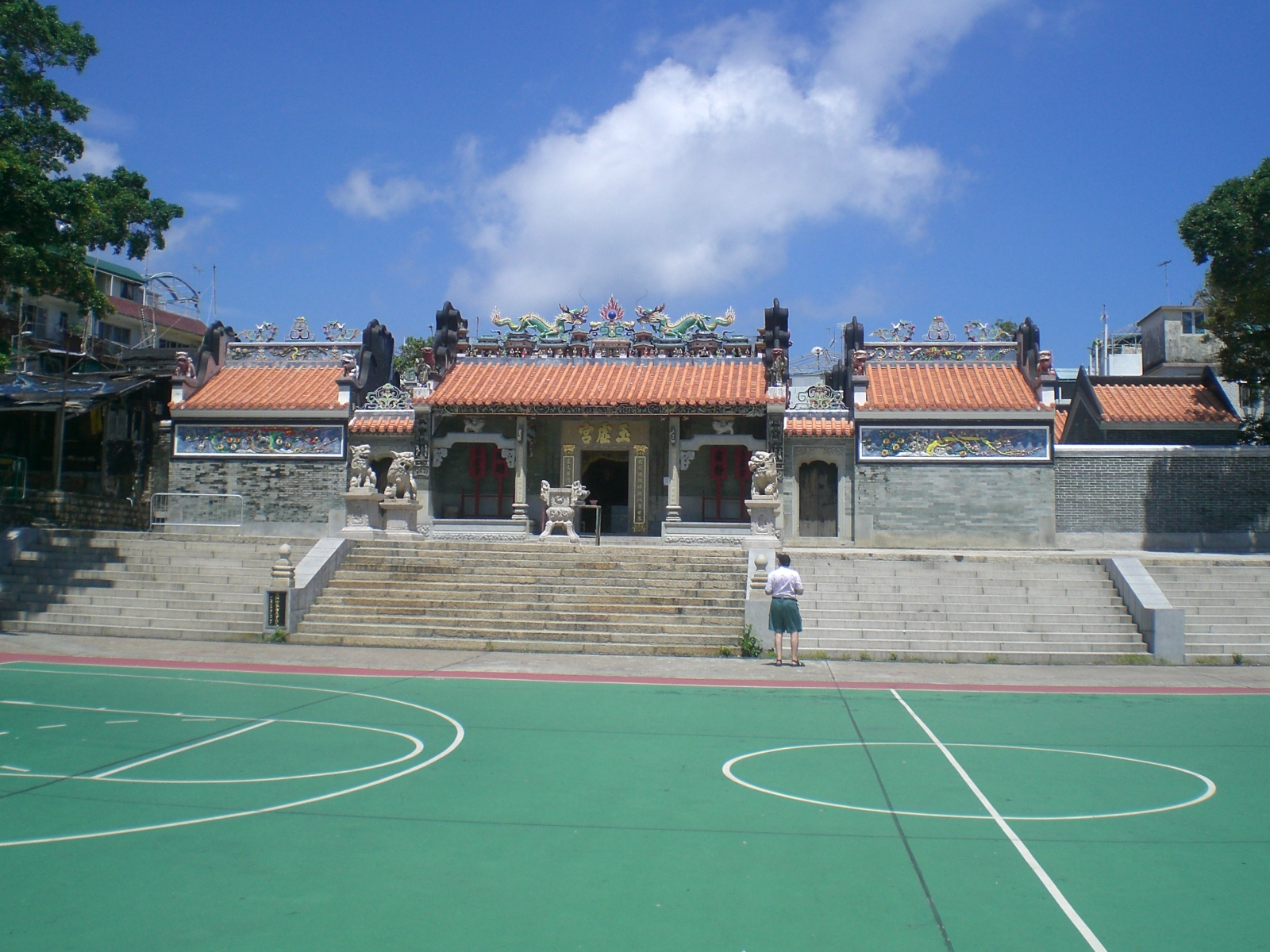
Overall view of the temple

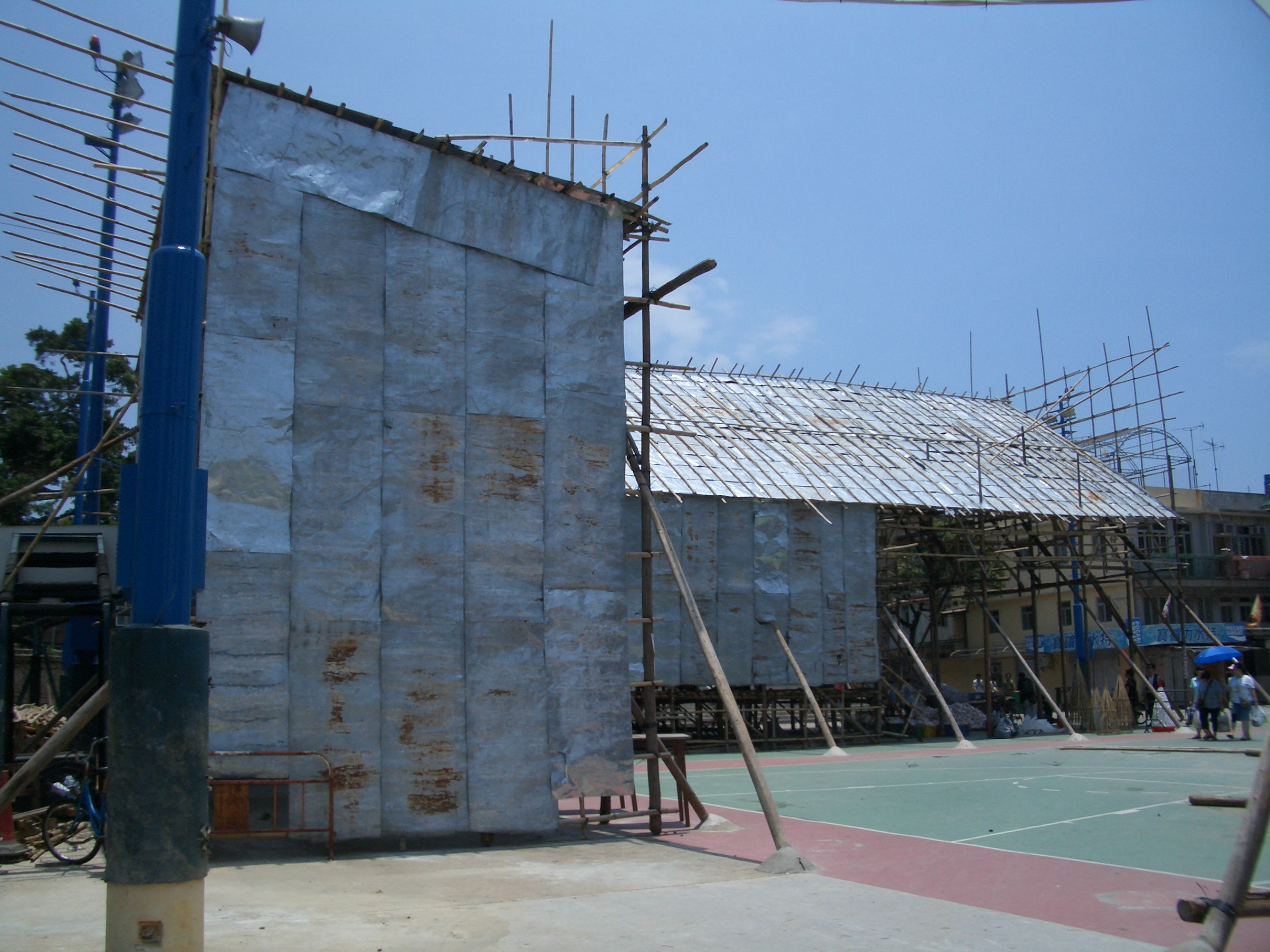
Construction of a pavilion for the Cheung Chau Bun Festival

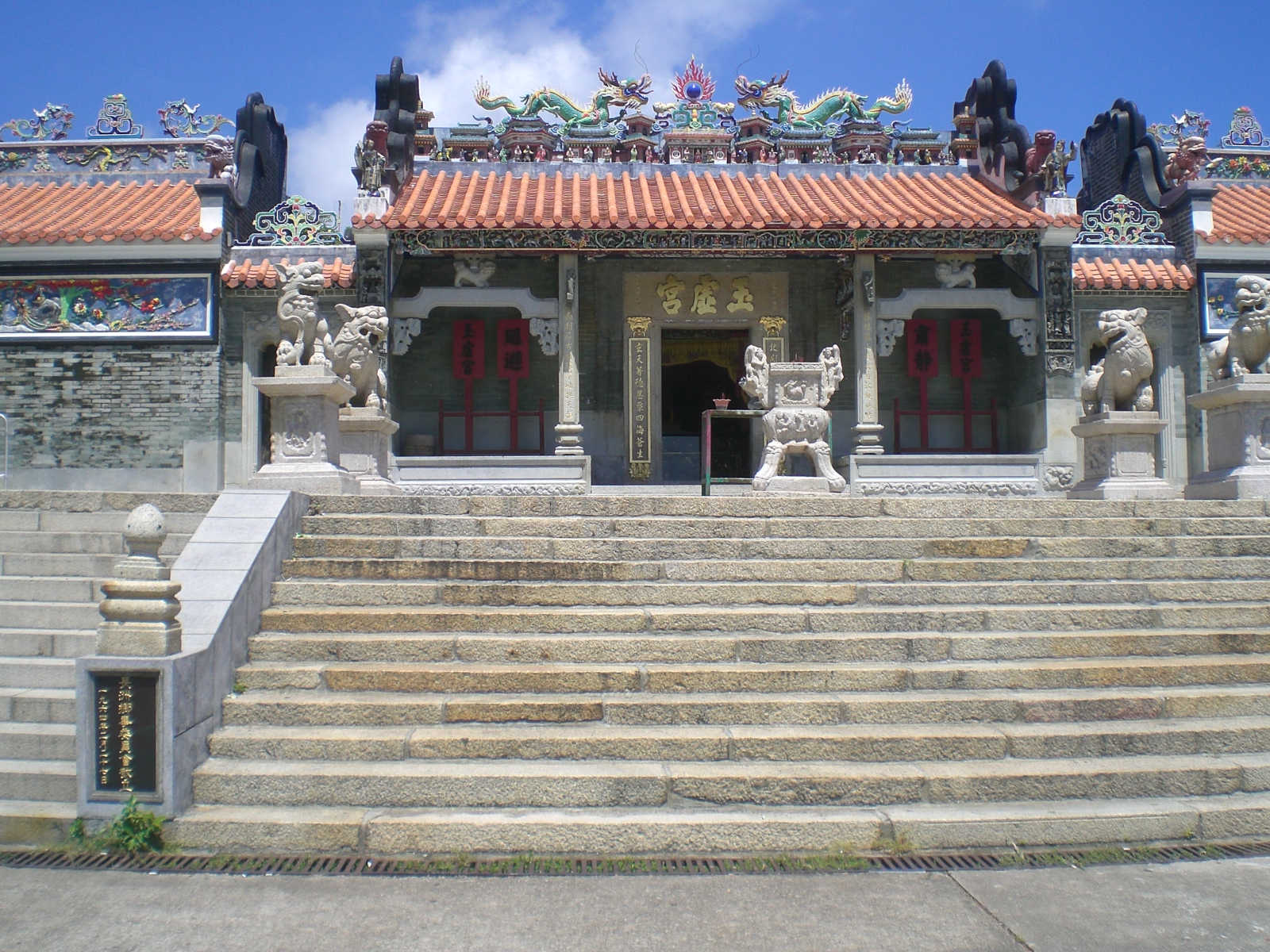
The temple in 2008

Location of Cheung Chau

== See also ==
- Pak Tai Temple in Wan Chai (灣仔北帝廟), Hong Kong (Chinese Wikipedia)
- Sam Tai Tsz Temple and Pak Tai Temple
