= Ping on bun =

Traditional sweet steamed bun from Cheung Chau, Hong Kong

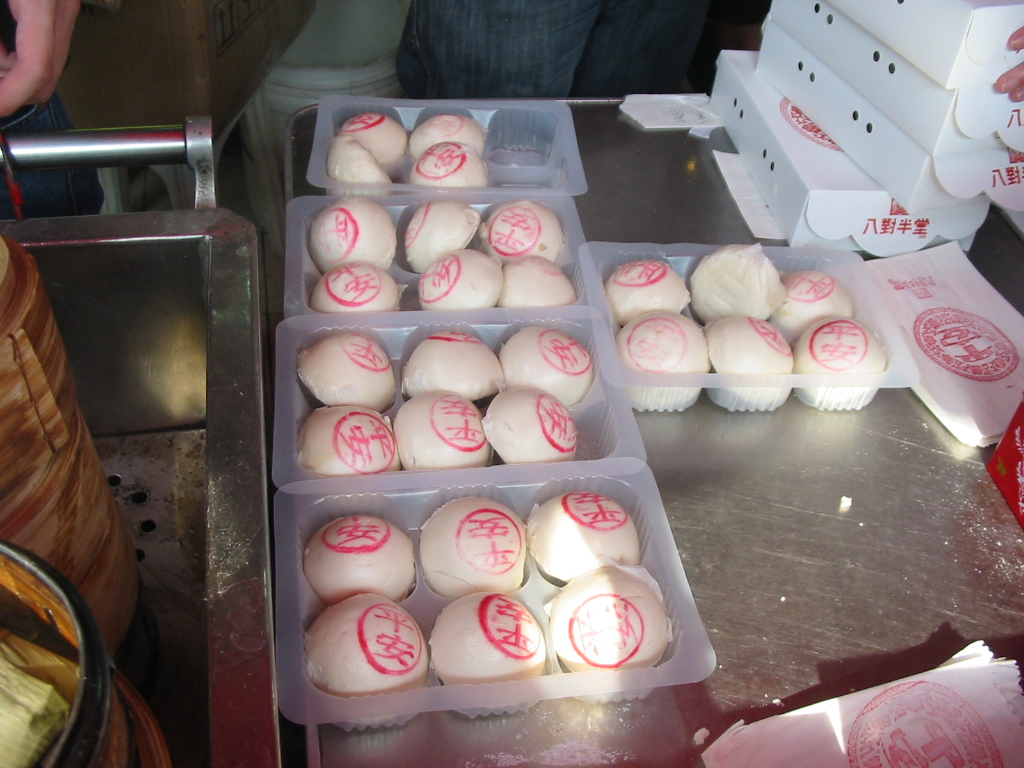
Ping on buns on sale during the Cheung Chau Bun Festival

Ping on bun (Chinese: 平安包; Jyutping: ping4 on1 baau1) is a traditional Hong Kong food. It is a steamed bun consisting of low-protein rice flour and sugar, with a filling of either lotus seed paste, sesame, or sweet bean paste, that is then stamped with Chinese text reading "peace" or "safety" (Chinese: 平安; Jyutping: ping4 on1). It is best served hot or at room temperature.

The ping on bun originates from Cheung Chau island in the Islands District of the New Territories of Hong Kong. It is strongly associated with the annual Cheung Chau Bun Festival, which revolves around the ping on bun and includes the construction of tall towers of buns.

== History ==
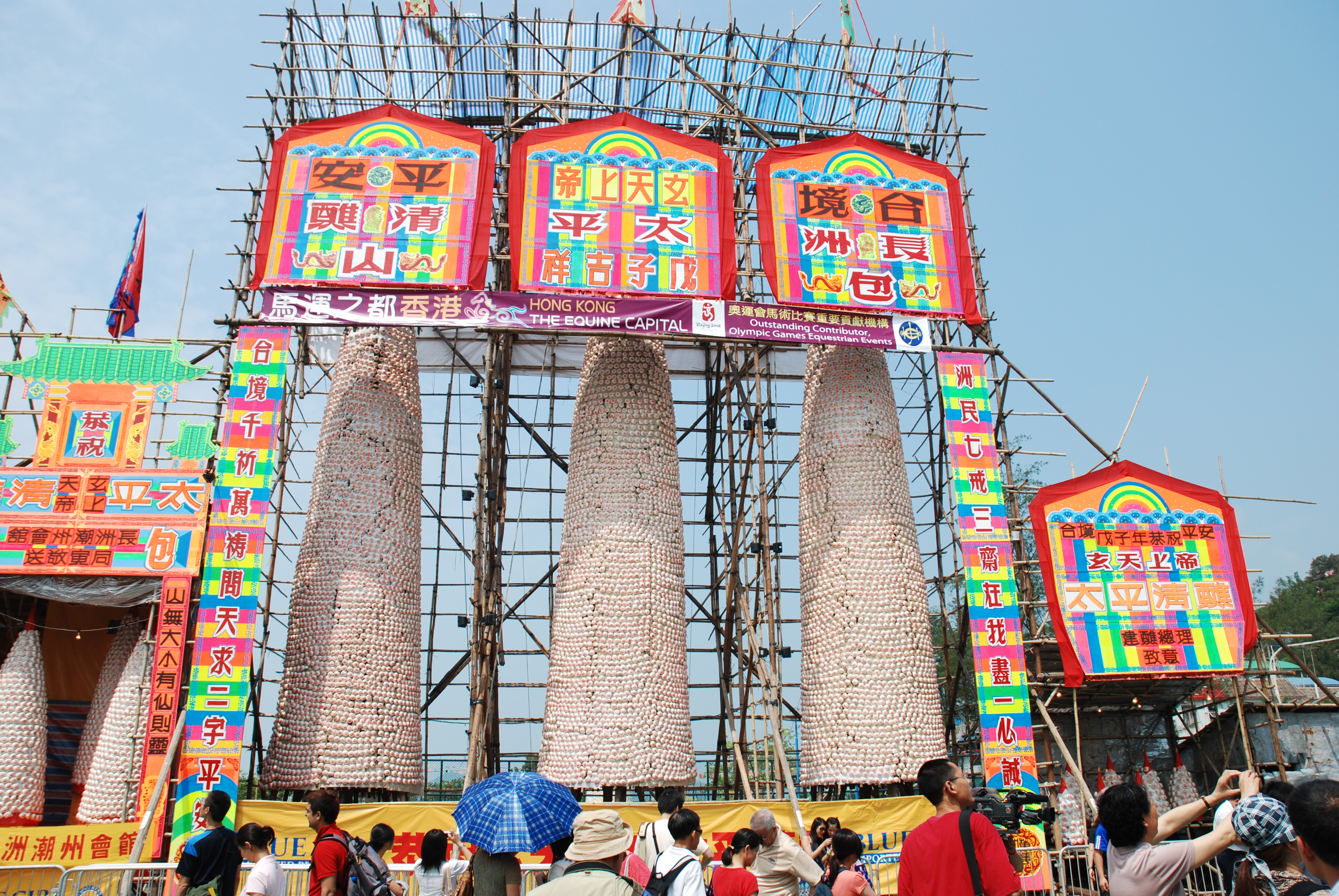
Towers of ping on buns during the Cheung Chau Bun Festival

During the mid-Qing Dynasty, villages in Cheung Chau were plagued by an epidemic and constant raids from pirates. As a result, villagers decided to gather before Pak Tai and pray, and later on were instructed to set up altars and say mass to scare the evil spirits away. Afterwards, islanders built temples to show gratitude to Pak Tai's blessings, viewing him as the guardian of the village. The villagers believed that eating hot ping on bun helped to ward off disease, and that spreading powdered ping on buns in the sea calmed the ocean.

Over time, as both the epidemic and the pirates were no longer threats, the annual Cheung Chau Bun Festival became a cultural tradition. Villagers dressed up as gods to vanquish evil. The ping on bun was used to build the bun towers (three towers that stood 18 metres tall made of a huge number of buns) during the festival. Buns were to be distributed to the villagers after prayers and used to offer sacrifice to Gods and ghosts.

== Cultural influence ==
More than 48,000 tourists go to Cheung Chau during the bun festival.

The distribution of ping on buns outside the Pak Tai Temple attract a hundred people queuing from the morning. Kwok Kam Kee, a shop selling ping on buns, sold more than 10,000 buns a day while there were long queues outside the shop in the morning. Customers often have to wait up to half an hour to buy fresh ping on buns.

Kwong Koon Wan, who earned more than $10,000 by selling a variety of ping on bun-themed souvenirs, said the bun cushions and fans were popular among tourists and expected that he could earn more than $30,000 in revenue.

== Social issues ==
=== Food safety ===
On 24 May 2015, Yee Ma Bakery on Sun Hing Street in Cheung Chau was found to sell ping on buns that contained Red 2G, a carcinogenic food dye that prohibited for use in food production and processing. The bakery was accused of violating the Food Safety Ordinance. Mr. Wan, owner of the shop, claimed that the same food dye was used for three years and the bun packages clearly list out the name and information of the agency, and that the food dye is a legal product. However, they were ultimately ordered to dispose of hundreds of ping on buns, causing a large losses in material fees.

=== Food waste ===
As ping on bun is made by with fresh ingredients, it will spoil easily. During Cheung Chau Bun Festival 2015, nearly 10,000 buns spoiled.

Because of the heavy rain and the hot weather, the buns of the three bun mountain became moldy and even caused some sour smell and odours. There are thousands of bun pieces left on the ground during the festival. Originally, the Cheung Chau council managed to distribute all the buns of the bun mountains to the public. As the buns were spoilt, the Cheung Chau council obtained help from two bakeries and bought buns from all the bakeries from Cheung Chau directly in a bid to solving the problem.

A representative of Cheung Chau bakery Kam Kwok said that the rising cost of making the bun such as the rent, ingredients, packaging, and other costs has increased, increasing the bun's price from $6 to $7.
