= Chinese Temples Committee =

Statutory body in Hong Kong

The Chinese Temples Committee (Chinese: 華人廟宇委員會) is a statutory body in Hong Kong established in 1928 under the Chinese Temples Ordinance (華人廟宇條例) (Cap. 153). It is mainly responsible for the operation and management of twenty-four temples directly under its management. It also handles temple registration. There are 20 additional temples, of which management has been delegated to other organisations.

== Organisation ==
The committee is chaired by the Secretary for Home Affairs. It consists of eight persons, including the chairman of the board of directors of the Tung Wah Group of Hospitals and six persons appointed by the Secretary for Home Affairs through delegated authority by the Chief Executive.

== Administered temples ==
Twenty-four temples are directly administered by the Chinese Temples Committee:

- Lin Fa Kung, Tai Hang
- Yuk Wong Kung Din, A Kung Ngam, Shau Kei Wan
- Tin Hau Temple, Aberdeen
- Tam Kung and Tin Hau Temples, Wong Nai Chung
- Tin Hau Temple, Shau Kei Wan
- Shing Wong Temple, Shau Kei Wan
- Tam Kung Temple, A Kung Ngam, Shau Kei Wan
- Kwun Yum Temple, Ap Lei Chau
- Hung Shing Temple, Ap Lei Chau
- Pak Tai Temple, Wan Chai
- Tin Hau Temple, To Kwa Wan
- Kwun Yum Temple, Hung Hom
- Tin Hau Temple, Cha Kwo Ling
- Sam Tai Tze & Pak Tai Temples, Sham Shui Po
- Tin Hau Temple, Sham Shui Po
- Kwan Tai Temple (Mo Tai Temple), Sham Shui Po
- Hau Wong Temple, Junction Road
- Pak Tai Temple, Hok Yuen Kok (Ma Tau Wai Road)
- Hau Wong Temple, Tai O
- Tin Hau Temple, Joss House Bay
- Che Kung Temple, Sha Tin
- Tin Hau Temple, Peng Chau
- Pak Tai Temple, Cheung Chau
- Hung Shing Temple, Cheung Chau

== Delegated temples ==
The management of twenty temples has been delegated to other organizations:

- Hung Shing Temple, Wan Chai
- Tin Hau Temple, Stanley
- Pak Tai Temple, Stanley
- Tai Wong Temple, Stanley
- To Tei Temple, Stanley
- Shui Sin Temple, Stanley
- To Che Fat She
- Tin Hau Temple, Shek O
- Tin Hau Temple, Yau Ma Tei
- Shea Tan, Yau Ma Tei
- Fook Tak Tsz, Yau Ma Tei
- Shing Wong Temple, Yau Ma Tei
- The School, Yau Ma Tei
- Shui Yuet Kung, Shantung Street
- Hung Shing Temple, Fuk Tsun Street
- Kwun Yum Temple, Tsz Wan Shan
- Sik Sik Yuen's Wong Tai Sin Temple
- Tin Hau Temple, Wong Lung Hang, Tung Chung
- Hau Wong Temple, Tung Chung
- Tin Hau Temple, Tai Shek Hau (Chung Hing Street), Cheung Chau

== See also ==
- Taai Ping Ching Jiu (太平清醮)
- Tin Hau temples in Hong Kong
- Kwan Tai temples in Hong Kong
- Hip Tin temples in Hong Kong
- Hong Kong Government Lunar New Year kau chim tradition
- Taoism in Hong Kong
- Places of worship in Hong Kong
