= Sam Tai Tsz Temple and Pak Tai Temple =

Temple complex in Hong Kong

Coordinates: 22.329333°N 114.162494°E

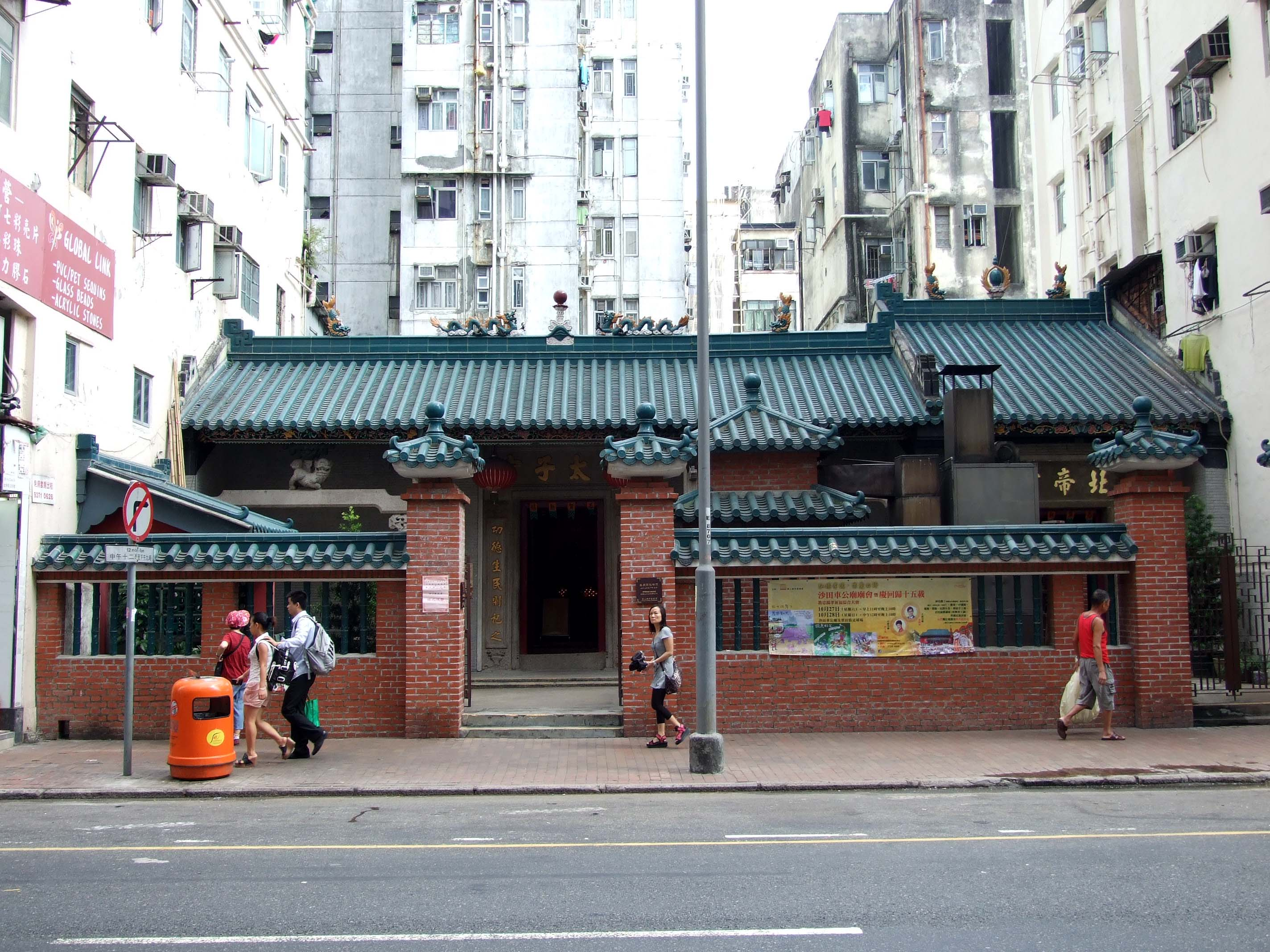
Sam Tai Tsz Temple and Pak Tai Temple complex.

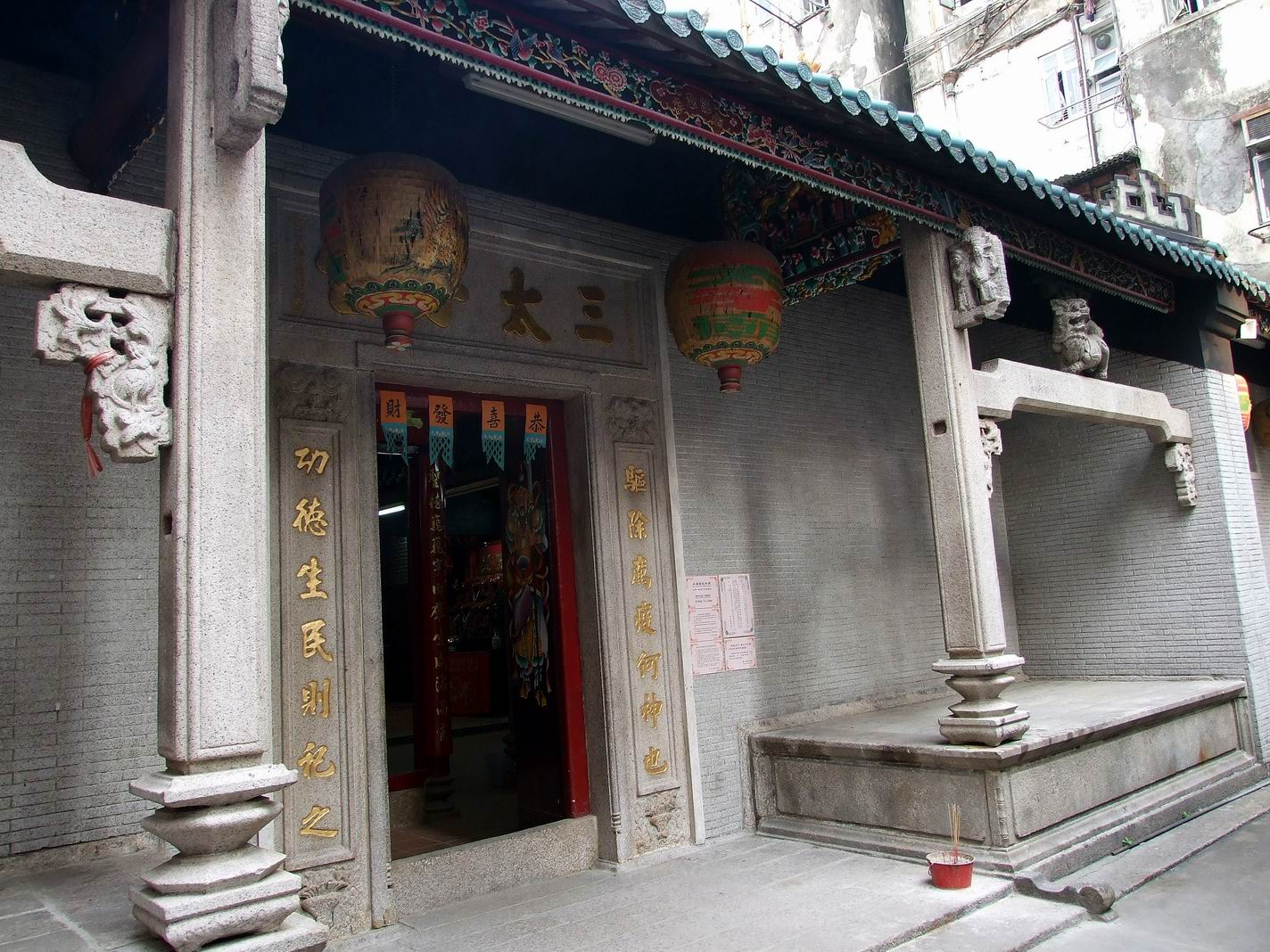
Sam Tai Tsz Temple.

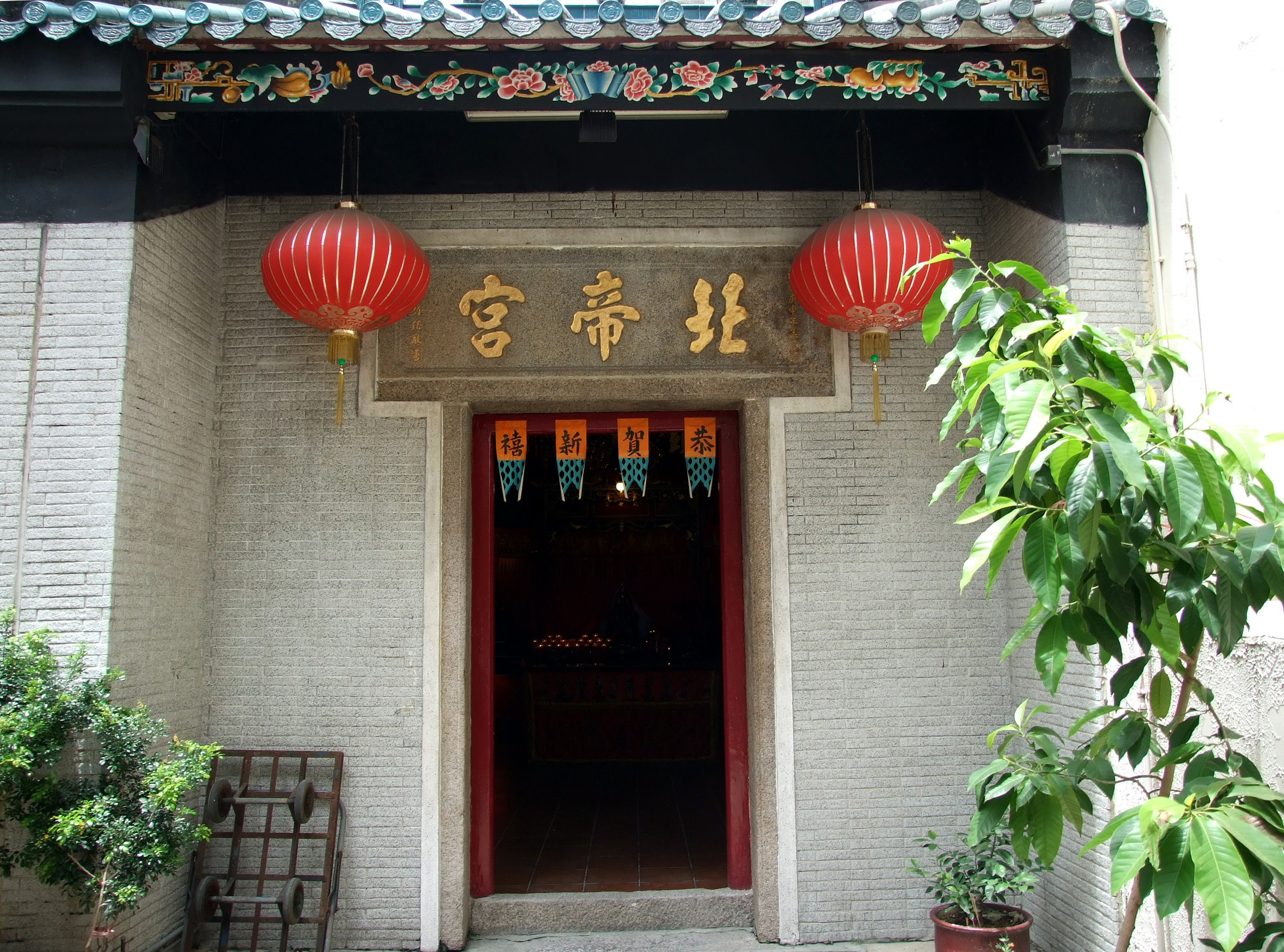
Entrance of Pak Tai Temple.

Sam Tai Tsz Temple and Pak Tai Temple (Chinese: 深水埗三太子及北帝廟) is a complex of two temples in Nos.196 and 198, Yu Chau Street, Sham Shui Po, New Kowloon, Hong Kong. It is a place of worship dedicated to two Deities, Sam Tai Tsz and Pak Tai.

The Sam Tai Tsz Temple is graded as Grade II historic building, while the Pak Tai Temple is a Grade III historic building. The interior of the complex can be explored with Google Street View.

== Sam Tai Tsz Temple ==
Sam Tai Tsz Temple (Chinese: 三太子宮; Jyutping: saam1 taai3 zi2 gung1) was built in 1898. The temple was built for the god Sam Tai Tsz (also named Na Cha), for his miracle to dissipate an outbreak of plague in the area in 1894. The god was invited from the temple in Wai Chau by Hakkas.

It is the only temple worshipping Sam Tai Tsz in Hong Kong.

== Pak Tai Temple ==
Pak Tai Temple of the complex was built in 1920 by the fishermen living in Sham Shui Po for worshipping Pak Tai, the God of the North.

== See also ==
- Wan Chai Pak Tai Temple
- Yuk Hui Temple in Cheung Chau
- Chinese Temples Committee
