= Hung Shing Temple, Tai Kok Tsui =

Temple in Hong Kong

Coordinates: 22.322116°N 114.163453°E

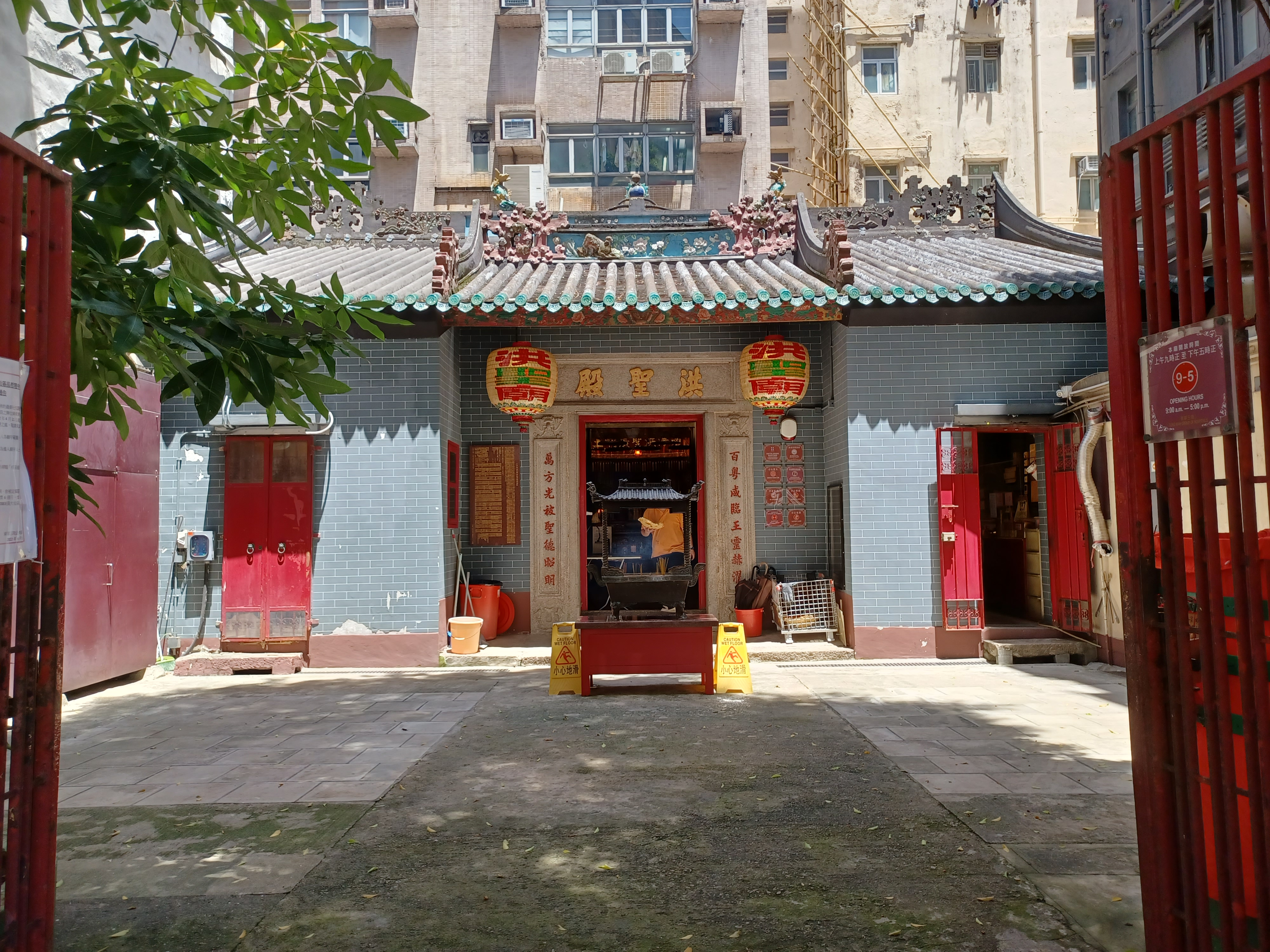
Hung Shing Temple, Tai Kok Tsui.

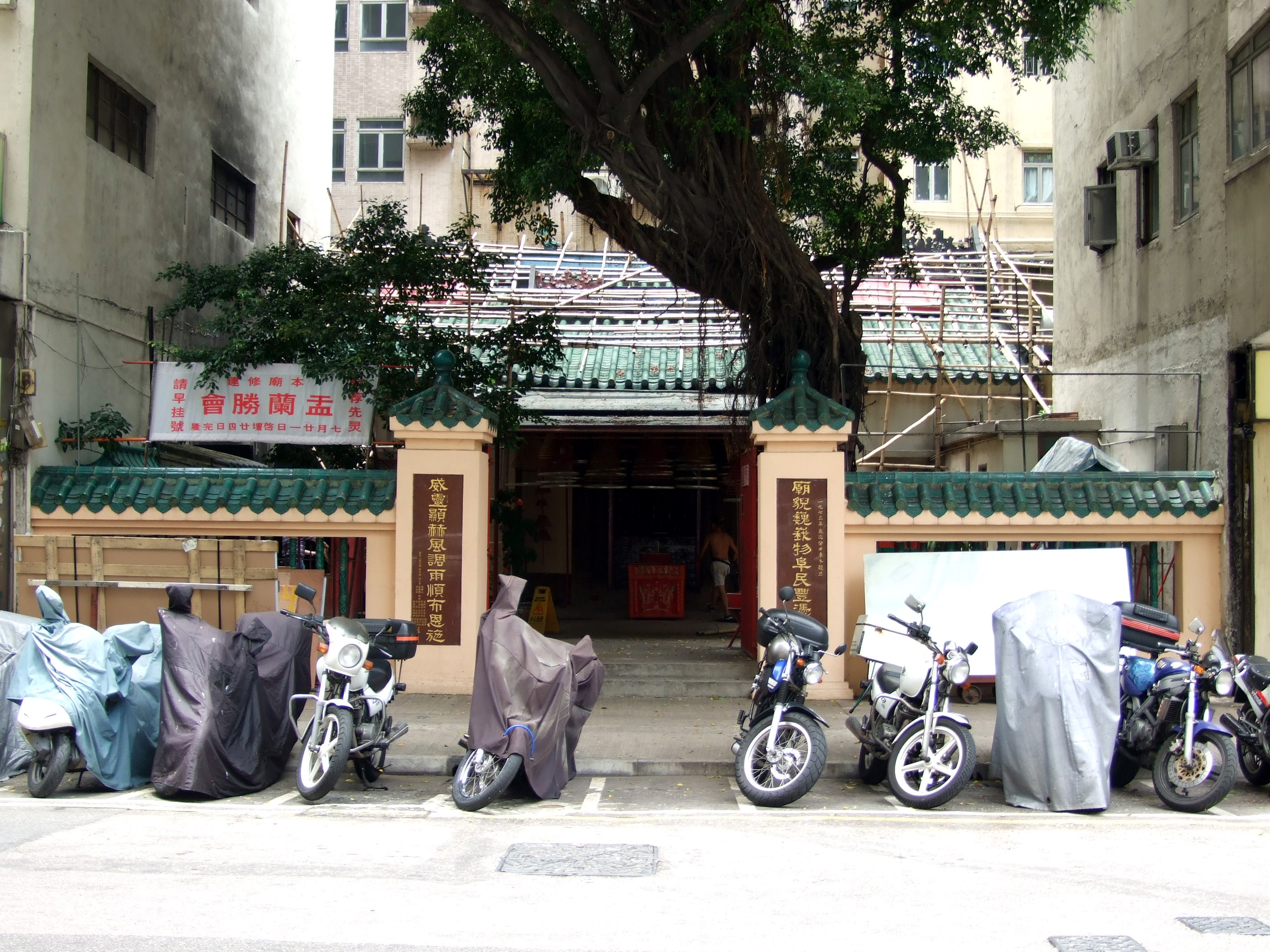
Hung Shing Temple, Tai Kok Tsui, viewed from Fuk Tsun Street.

The Hung Shing Temple, Tai Kok Tsui (Chinese: 大角咀洪聖殿) or Hung Shing Temple, Fuk Tsun Street (福全街洪圣庙) is a Hung Shing Temple located at No. 58 Fuk Tsun Street (福全街), in the Tai Kok Tsui area of Hong Kong. It is the only Hung Shing temple in urban Kowloon.

== History ==
The temple was originally built in 1881 in the village of Fuk Tsun Heung (福全鄉) which was located at the intersection of Boundary Street and Tai Kok Tsui Road. At the time of the 1911 census, the population of Fuk Tsun Heung was 861, the number of males was 610.

In 1928, the Government developed the area and the Village was cleared. In 1930, the temple was rebuilt at the present site, which was named after the Village, and it has since been managed by the Tung Wah Group of Hospitals, by delegation from the Chinese Temples Committee.

== Conservation ==
The temple is listed as a Grade III historic building.
