= Cheung Chau Bun Festival =

Hong Kong festival

Cheung Chau Bun Festival 包山節
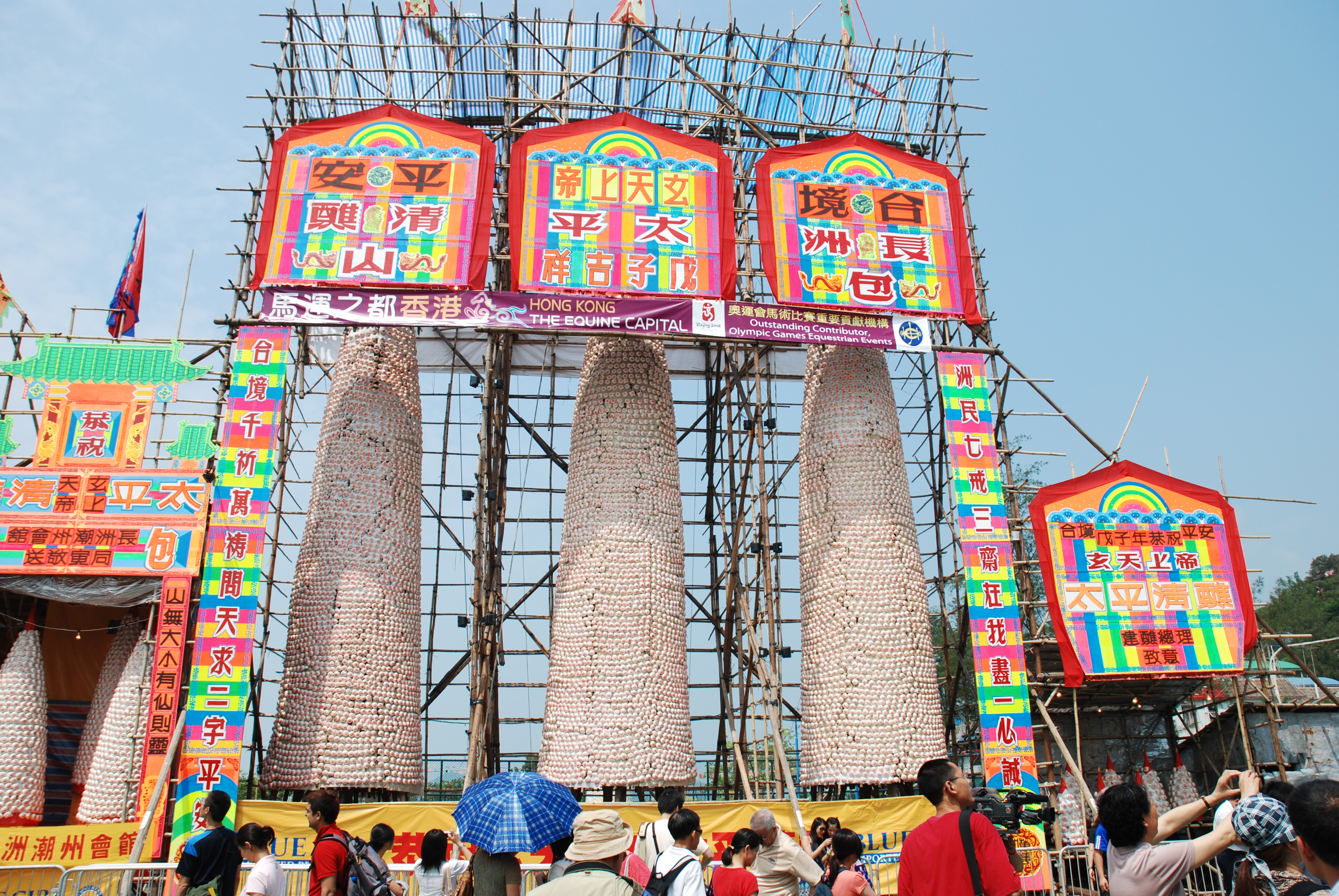
- A mountain of buns to be climbed for the festival
- Status: Active
- Genre: Festival
- Date: April / May
- Frequency: Annually
- Locations: Cheung Chau, Hong Kong
- Inaugurated: 18th century

Cheung Chau Bun Festival
- Traditional Chinese: 包山節
- Simplified Chinese: 包山节
Transcriptions
Standard Mandarin
- Hanyu Pinyin: Bāoshānjié
Yue: Cantonese
- Yale Romanization: Bāau sāan jit
- Jyutping: Baau^{1} saan^{1} zit^{3}

Cheung Chau Da Jiu Festival
- Traditional Chinese: 長洲太平清醮
- Simplified Chinese: 长洲太平清醮
Transcriptions
Standard Mandarin
- Hanyu Pinyin: Chángzhōu Tàipíng Qīngjiào
Yue: Cantonese
- Yale Romanization: Chèuhng jāu taai pìhng chīng jiu
- Jyutping: Coeng^{4} zau^{1} taai^{3} ping^{4} cing^{1} ziu^{3}

Cheung Chau Bun Festival or Cheung Chau Da Jiu Festival is a traditional Chinese festival held on the island of Cheung Chau in Hong Kong. Held annually, the festival receives widespread public exposure, making it the most famous of such Da Jiu festivals, with Jiu (醮) being a Taoist sacrificial ceremony. Such events are primarily held by rural communities in Hong Kong, either annually or at a set intervals of up to once every 60 years (i.e. the same year in the Chinese astrological calendar). Other places that may share the folk custom include Taiwan, Sichuan, Fujian and Guangdong.

== Overview ==
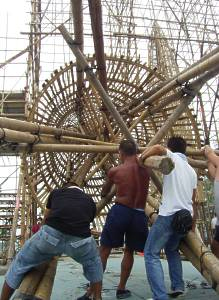
The old-style "Bun Mountain" made up of bamboo poles

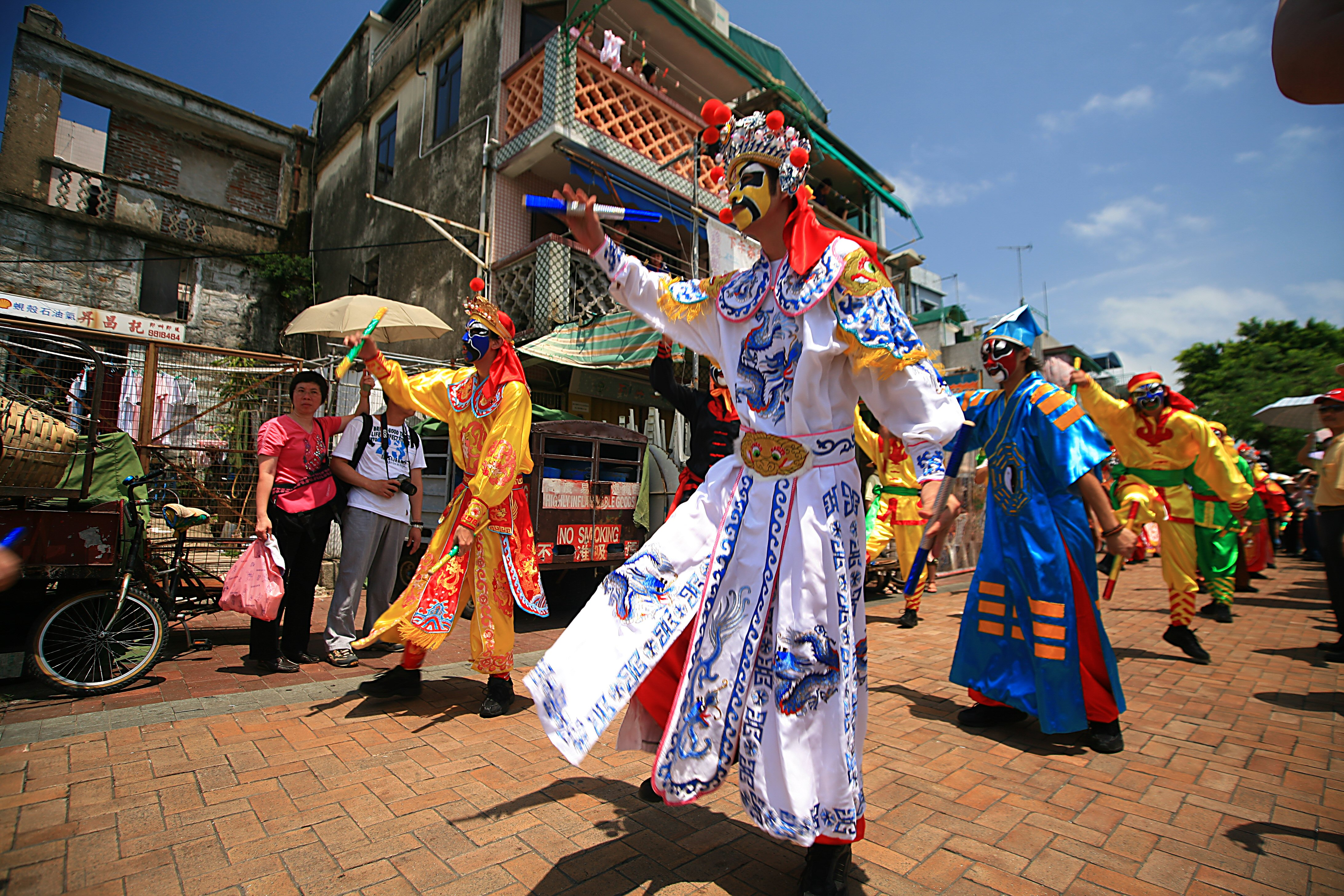
Dancers in the Flying Colors Parade.

Cheung Chau's Bun Festival, which draws tens of thousands of local and overseas tourists every year, is staged to mark the eighth day of the fourth month, in the Chinese calendar (usually in early May), coinciding with the local celebration of Buddha's Birthday.

The Cheung Chau Bun Festival began as a ritual for fishing communities to pray for safety from pirates. Today, this religious origin has largely been forgotten, and the festival has primarily become a showcase of traditional Chinese culture.

Kwok Kam Kee, the official bun supplier for the event, produces over 60,000 buns for the festival.

== History ==
One account of the festival's origin states that in the 18th century, the island of Cheung Chau was devastated by a plague and infiltrated by pirates until local fishermen brought an image of their patron deity, Pak Tai, to the island. Paraded through the village lanes, the deity is believed to have driven away evil spirits. Villagers also disguised themselves as various other deities and walked around the island to ward off the evil spirits. The Hailufeng people were the first on Cheung Chau to worship Pak Tai, followed by the Cantonese and Tanka communities. Gradually, all dialect groups on the island began participating in the Cheung Chau Bun Festival which integrates different folk elements.

== Activities ==
=== Vegetarian ===
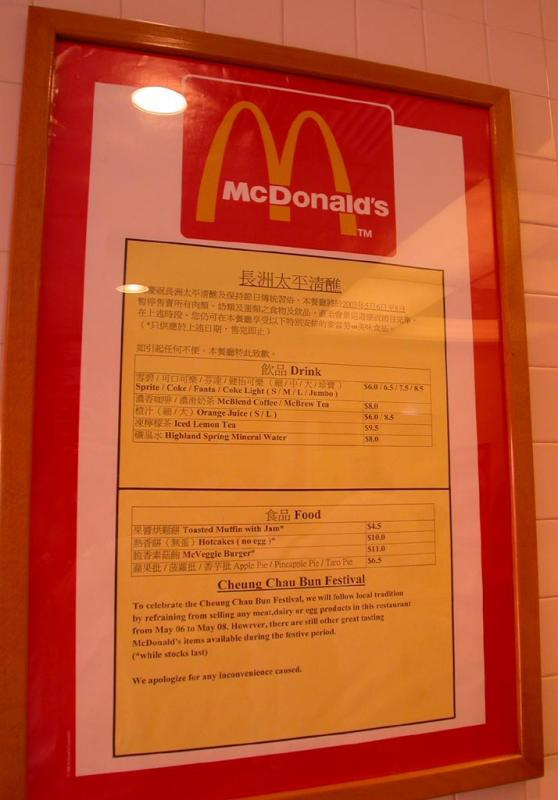
A notice announces that McDonald's is selling McVeggie burgers

Every year, on the 8th day of the fourth month of the lunar calendar, the islanders organize the week-long Cheung Chau Bun Festival usually in April or May. The festival lasts for seven days. On three of these days, the entire island follows a vegetarian diet; most of the island's famous seafood restaurants adhere to this tradition. The local McDonald's also takes meat off the menu and instead sells veggie burgers made of mushrooms.

=== Parade of floats / Floating Colours ===
In addition to traditional lion dances and dragon dances, children dressed as legendary and modern heroes are suspended above the crowd on the tips of swords and paper fans (飄色). They form a parade-in-the-air, secured within steel frames, and appear as though they are gliding through the air. Local parents consider it a great honor for their children to participate in this procession.

The procession is accompanied by musicians loudly beating gongs and drums, which are traditionally believed to ward off evil spirits. It is led by the image of Pak Tai, the God of Water and Lord of the North, to whom the island's Temple of the Jade Vacuity is dedicated.

=== Deities ===
Here are some of the important Deities worshipped by Cheung Chau people during the festive celebration:

==== Pak Tai ====
Since Cheung Chau is traditionally an island of fisherfolk, Pak Tai is its most revered divinity, since it is believed he has the power to confer smooth sailing for the fishing boats as well as providing good catches for their crews. Pious believers recognise him as "Pei Fang Chen Wu Hsuan T'ien Shang Ti" (True Soldier and Superior Divinity of the Deep Heaven of the North).

==== Tin Hau (Tian Shang Sheng Mu) ====
Another major deity in the celebration is Tin Hau, a sea goddess traditionally regarded as a protector of fishers and seafarers. Culturally associated with storm warnings and maritime rescue, she is widely venerated by coastal communities in Southern China.

==== Kuan Yin and Hung Hsing ====
Two more deities complete the celestial divinities taking part in the parade: Kuan Yin, the Goddess of Mercy with her tranquil and ever compassionate smile; and Hung Shing, the terrifying God of the South with his menacing head-dress, unkind face, bushy black beard.

=== Bun snatching ===
The centrepiece of the festival is at Pak Tai Temple where the "Bun Towers" (包山) stand. These are three giant 60-feet bamboo towers covered with buns. It is these bun-covered towers that give the festival its name. It originates from the custom in Southern Fujian and Chaozhou known as qianggu (Chinese: 搶孤; Pe̍h-ōe-jī: chhiúⁿ-ko·), where people snatch food that has been offered to the lonely spirits. Historically, young men would race up the tower to get hold of the buns; the higher the bun, the better fortune it was supposed to bring to the holder's family; the race was known as "Bun-snatching" (搶包山). However, during a race in 1978 one of the towers collapsed, injuring more than 100 people. In subsequent years, three designated climbers (one climber to each tower) raced up their respective towers and having cleared the top buns proceeded to strip the towers of their buns as they descended.

The three "Bun Mountains" are still placed in the area in front of Pak Tai Temple, and are constructed using the traditional fixation method — bamboo scaffolding.

In 2005, a single tower climbing event in the adjacent sports ground was revived as a race—with extra safety precautions including proper mountain-climbing tools as well as tutorials for participants (which now include women). A teamwork version of the event was added in 2006. The revised version of "Bun-snatching" as well as the traditional three "Bun Mountains" still have their buns removed from the towers at midnight of the Festival.

In February 2007, it was further announced that the buns on the single-tower construct will henceforth be made of plastic. During the festival, Chinese operas, lion dances, and religious services also take place on the island.

==== Kwok Ka-Ming ====
Cheung Chau Bun Festival
- Chinese: 郭嘉明
- Yale Romanization: Gwok Gāa mìhng
- Jyutping: Gwok^{3} Gaa^{1} ming^{4}

Kwok Ka-Ming, born in Cheung Chau, is a physical trainer and 4 times winner of the Cheung Chau bun-scrambling competition in Cheung Chau, Hong Kong. The Bun Scrambling Event has been a traditional activity of the Cheung Chau Bun Festival. Kwok is a resident of Cheung Chau Island and works as a physical trainer for Shatin firefighters.

In 2005, in the first year of the modern competition, the trophy eventually went to Mr Kwok Ka-ming, who led a narrow edge of 30 marks over the first runner-up, Mr Yau Hung-ming, who scored 423 marks. In 2006, after an exciting round of the competition, Kwok Ka-ming retains the trophy by scoring 705 marks.

In 2007, Kwok Ka-Ming won by scoring 648 marks. Kwok Ka-Ming lost his title in 2008, when he scored 715 marks. In 2009, Kwok Ka-Ming did not feature in the top 3. But Kwok was the bun-scrambling king again in 2010, when he won the game by scoring 939 points. In 2011 he failed to make it to the finals.

=== Burning of paper effigies ===
At a quarter to midnight a paper effigy of the King of the Ghosts is set ablaze, enormous incense sticks are lit and the buns are harvested and distributed to the villagers, who continue celebrating into the night.

== Return of bun-snatching ==
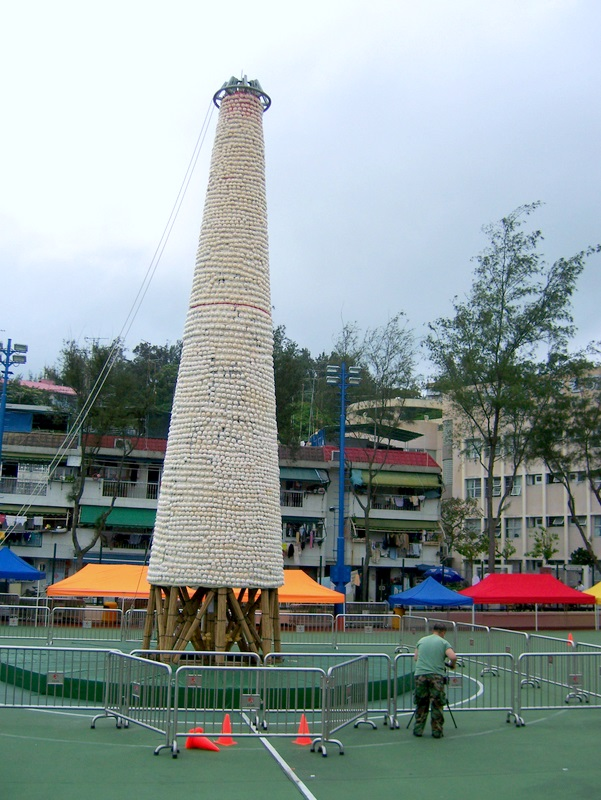
The new "Bun Mountain" used for bun-snatching competitions

As mentioned above, the bun-snatching ritual was abandoned by government decree due to the 1978 collapse of a tower. Still, many Cheung Chau villagers regard this celebration as part and parcel of their life, and also as an example of the precious culture of Hong Kong. In addition to the villagers' immense urge to resume the ritual, a local cartoon movie My Life as McDull recalled the abandoned ceremony, giving rise to nostalgia in its viewers. Because of its great popularity, the long-awaited ritual was reintroduced on 15 May 2005. Safety measures were intensified: only 12 well-trained athletes selected from preliminary competitions were permitted to climb on one single "Bun Mountain", and instead of bamboo, the framework of the "Bun Mountains" was made of steel.

=== More about My Life as McDull and bun-snatching ===
In a part of the film, McDull decides to train to be an Olympic-level athlete like the Hong Kong Olympian Lee Lai-shan. However, the trade he learns is Cheung Chau bun-snatching. Realising that bun-snatching is not a formal sporting event in the Olympic Games, McDull's mother writes a letter to the chairman of the International Olympic Committee (IOC), asking him/her with her limited proficiency of English to sanctify the so-called sport event.

== See also ==
- List of Buddhist festivals
- Culture of Hong Kong
- Chinese folk religion
- Taai Ping Ching Jiu (太平清醮)
- Taoism in Hong Kong
- Yuk Hui Temple, Pak She Street, Tung Wan
