= Dajiao =

Taoist festival

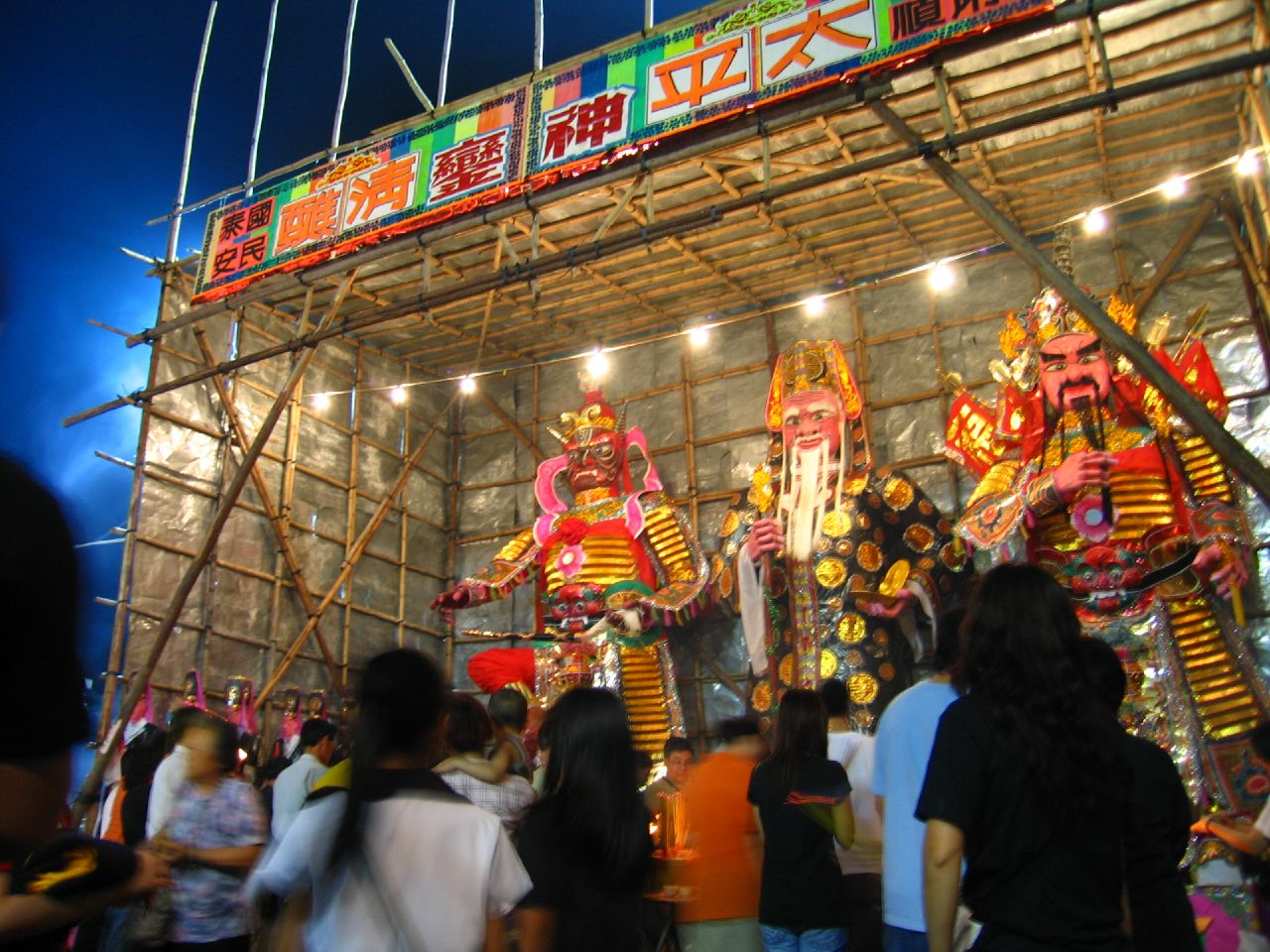
- Cheung Chau Bun Festival
- Traditional Chinese: 打醮
- Literal meaning: Worshipping the gods
Transcriptions
Standard Mandarin
- Hanyu Pinyin: Dǎ jiào
Yue: Cantonese
- Yale Romanization: Da jiu
- Jyutping: Da^{3} ziu^{3}

Taai ping ching jiu
- Traditional Chinese: 太平清醮
- Literal meaning: The Purest Sacrifice Celebrated for Great Peace
Transcriptions
Yue: Cantonese
- Yale Romanization: Taai pìhng chīng jiu
- Jyutping: Taai^{3} ping^{4} cing^{1} ziu^{3}

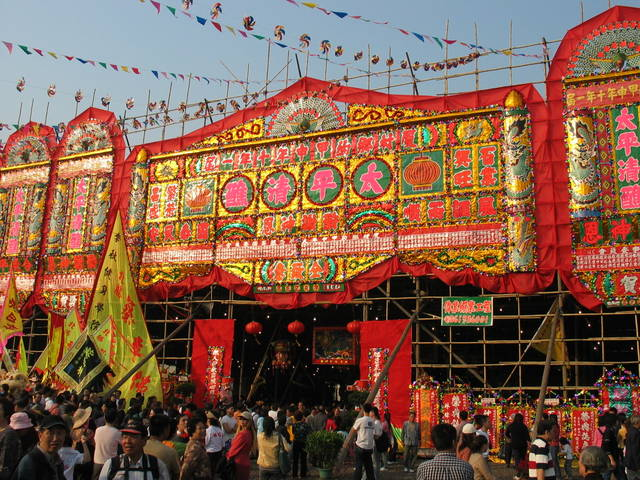
Tai Ping Ching Chiu in Hong Kong

Dajiao, (Chinese: 打醮) called the Taiping Qingjiao or Taai ping ching jiu in Hong Kong, (太平清醮) is a Taoist ritual and festival which is performed every year.

The ritual is to pray and request the Taoist Deities to bestow peace and harmony in the particular neighborhood or location. Pak Tai is the most popular Chinese Deity for this religious service and rituals. Believers have to abstain from meat and eat vegetarian food at the festival. It is performed across Greater China: Sichuan, Fujian, Taiwan, Guangdong and Hong Kong.

== Hong Kong ==
The festival name is transliterated as Tai Ping Ching Chiu from Cantonese. Some of these festivals are called Da Jiu Festival, a famous one of which is the Cheung Chau Bun Festival. This festival is also practiced in Hong Kong in Sheung Shui Wai, New Territories, Yuen Long and Kam Sheung Road.
