= Wan Chai Pak Tai Temple =

Temple in Wan Chai, Hong Kong

- 灣仔北帝廟 玉虛宮
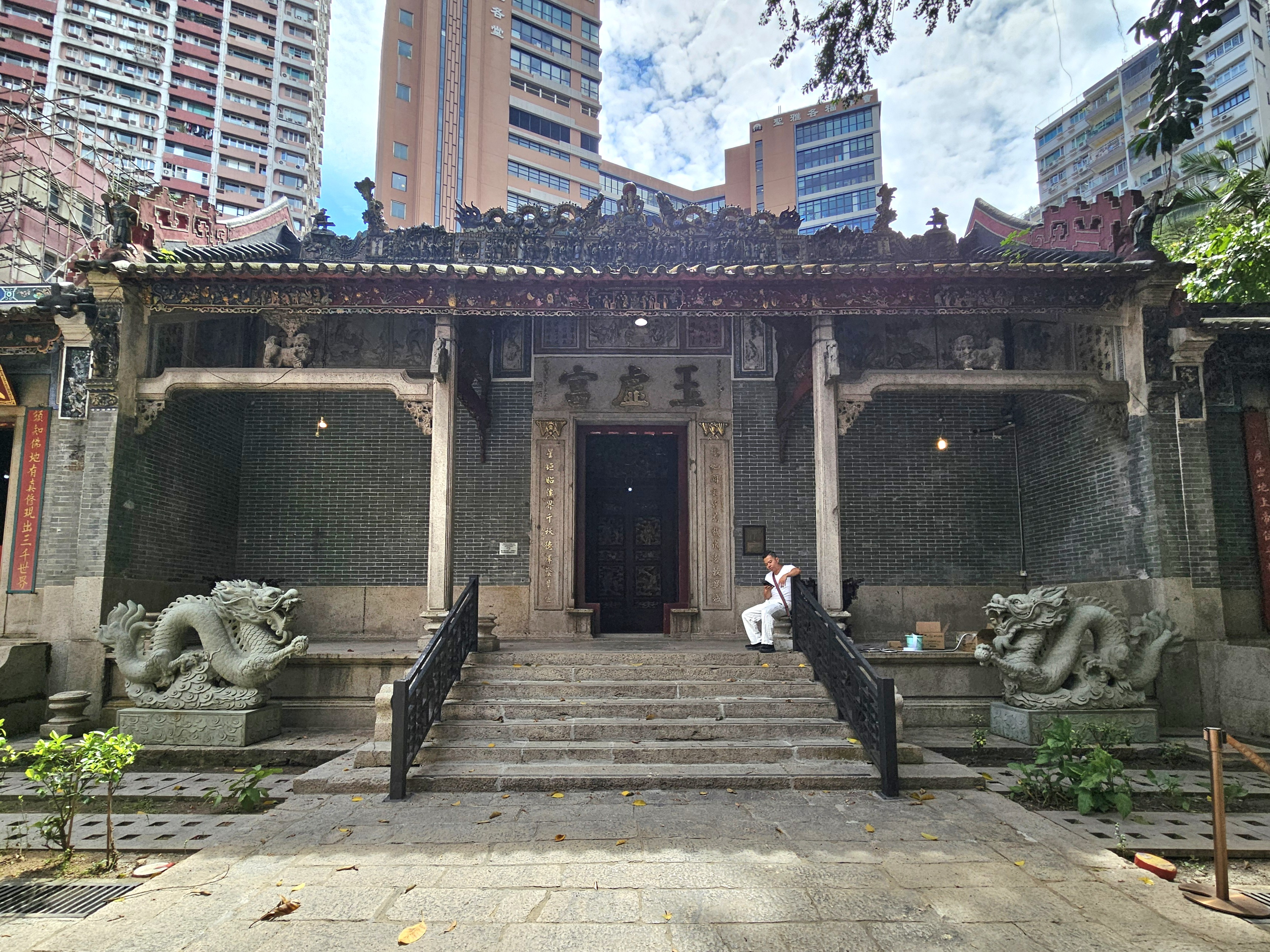
- Wan Chai Pak Tai Temple in 2025

- Location within Hong Kong

Religion
- Affiliation: Chinese folk religion
- District: Lung On Street, Wan Chai
- Deity: Pak Tai
- Governing body: Chinese Temples Committee

Location
- Country: Hong Kong
- Interactive map of Wan Chai Pak Tai Temple
- Coordinates: 22.272876°N 114.173823°E

Architecture
- Completed: 1863

Website
- Official website

Wan Chai Pak Tai Temple
- Traditional Chinese: 灣仔北帝廟
Transcriptions
Yue: Cantonese
- Yale Romanization: Wāan jái bāk dai miuh
- Jyutping: Waan1 zai2 bak1 dai3 miu6

Yuk Hui Kung
- Traditional Chinese: 玉虛宮
Transcriptions
Yue: Cantonese
- Yale Romanization: Yuhk hēui gūng
- Jyutping: Juk6 heoi1 gung1

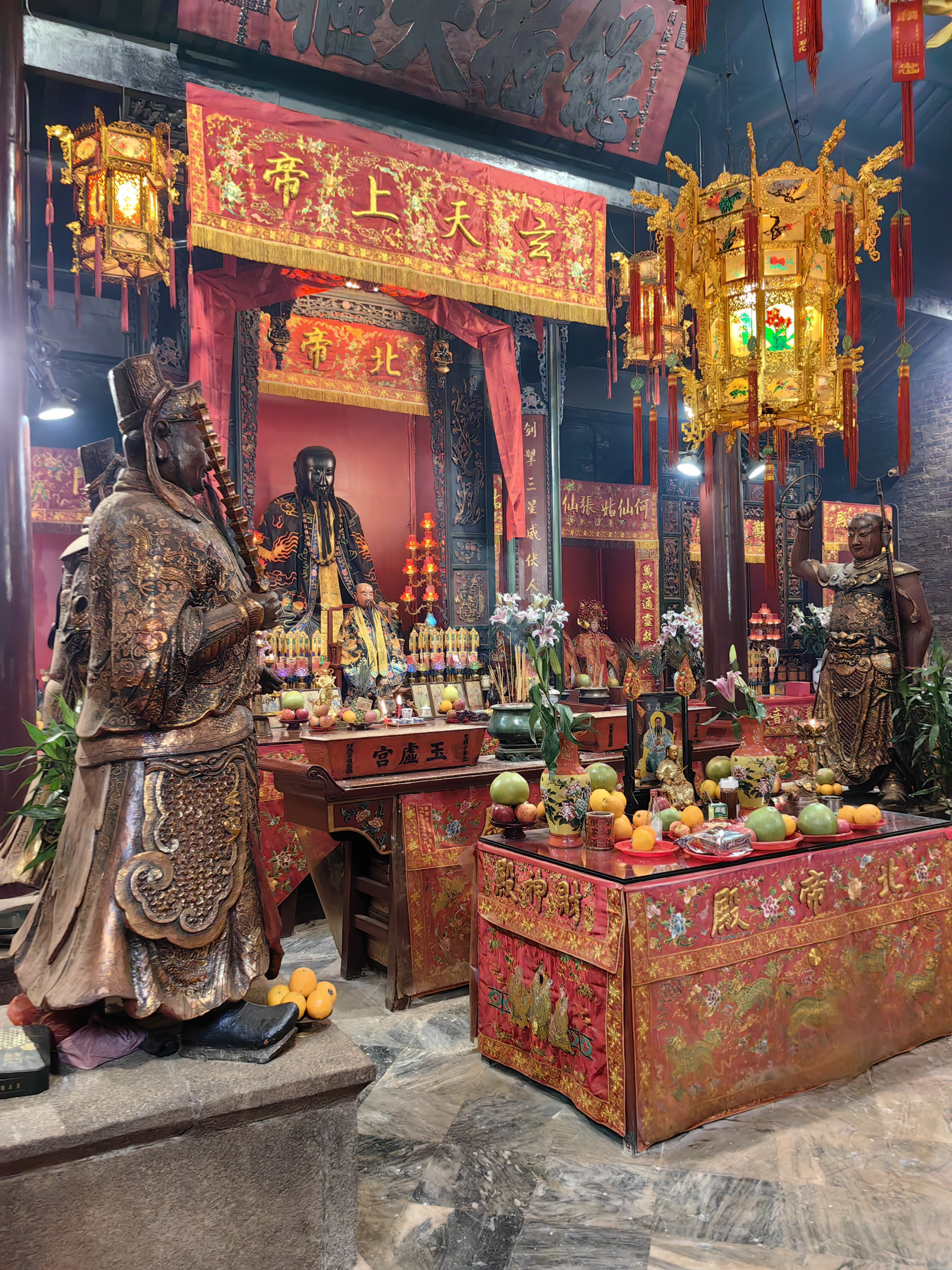
Statue of Pak Tai

The Wan Chai Pak Tai Temple, also known as Yuk Hui Kung, is located on Lung On Street in Wan Chai, Hong Kong. It was built by locals in 1863. The temple is dedicated to Pak Tai, a martial deity, and houses a 3 metres (9.8 ft) Ming Dynasty statue of Pak Tai built in 1603, as well as a number of antique bells cast in 1863. It is decorated with a large number of lotus lanterns.

The Temple consists of the main building and two annexes. The main building is dedicated to the worship of Pak Tai. Connected to the left of the Yuk Hui Temple is a Hall of Lung Mo (龍母殿; 'Hall of Dragon Mother') and a Hall of God of Wealth (財神殿) and to its right a Hall of Three Treasures (三寶殿) and the keeper's quarters which are probably later additions.

The temple is a declared monument of Hong Kong.
