= Heidi (god) =

Chinese deity, member of the Wufang Shangdi

- Diagram of the Wufang Shangdi
- Major cult centre: Mount Heng
- Predecessor: Baidi (Wuxing cycle)
- Successor: Cangdi (Wuxing cycle)
- Planet: Mercury

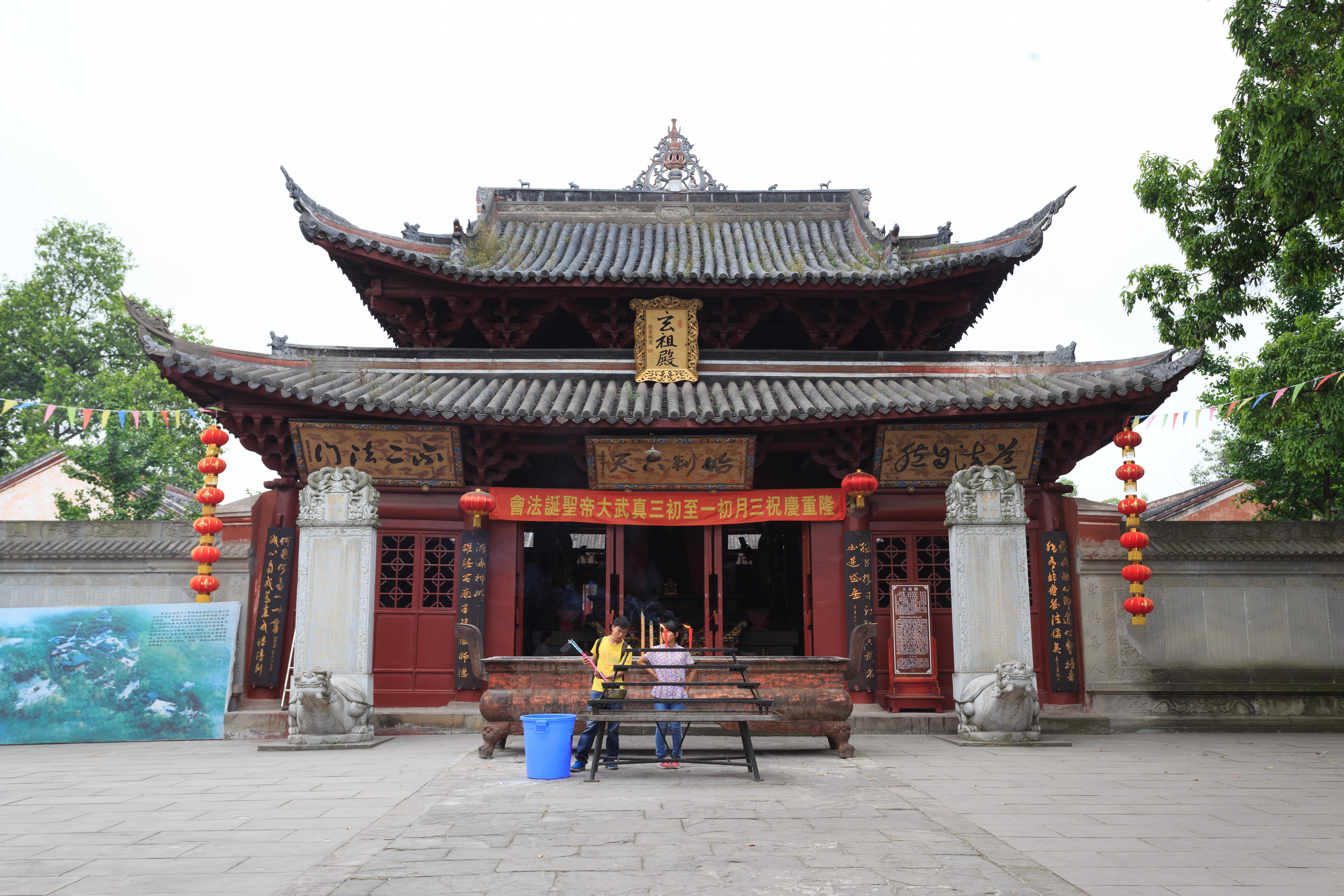
Temple of the Dark Ancestor (玄祖殿 Xuánzǔdiàn) in Yibin, Sichuan.

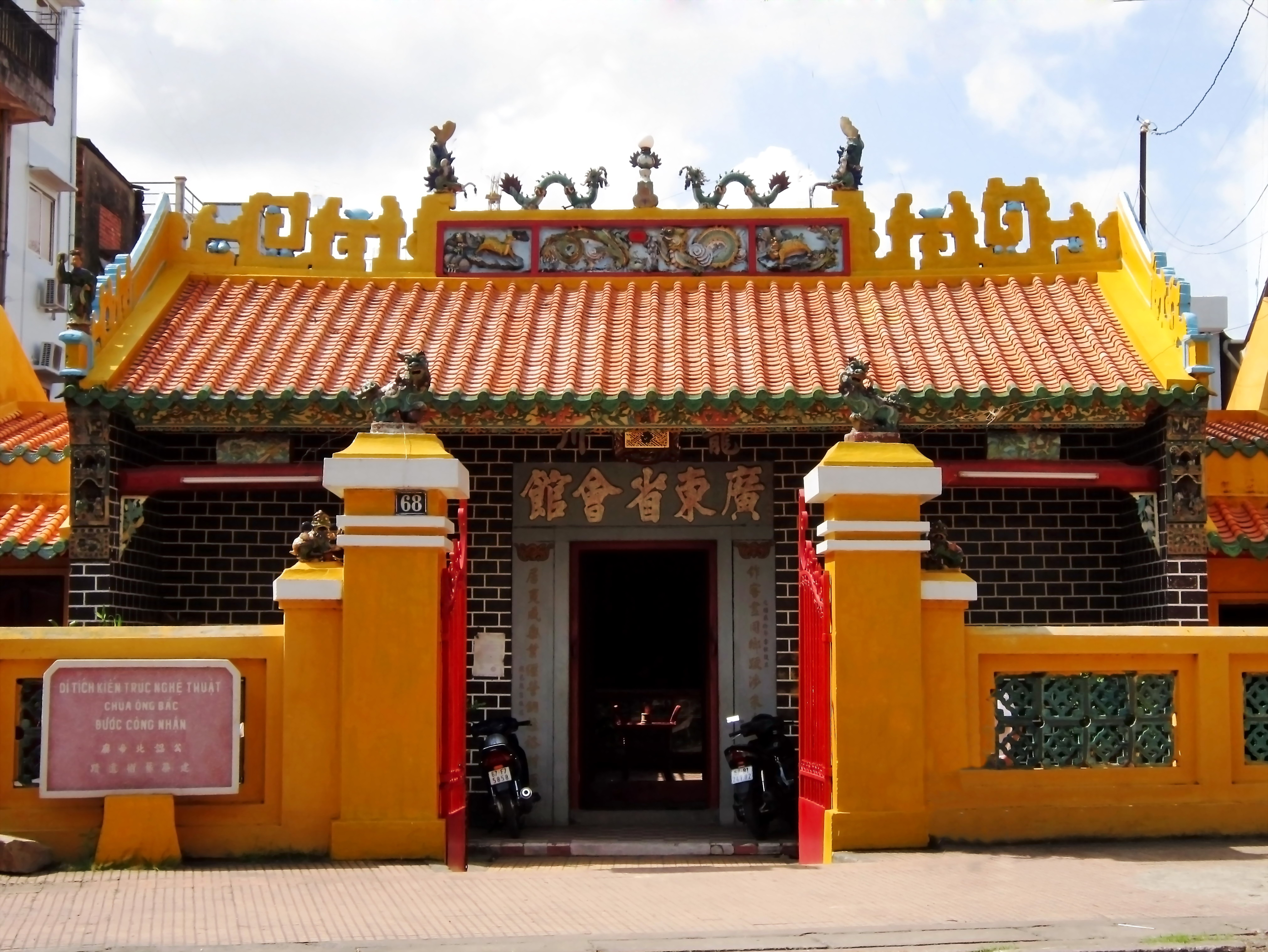
Chùa Ông Bắc (Temple of the North Deity) of the Hoa Chinese in Long Xuyên, An Giang Province, in Vietnam.

Hēidì (Chinese: 黑帝; lit. 'Black Deity') or Hēishén (黑神; 'Black God'), who is the Běidì (北帝; 'North Deity', Cantonese: Pak Tai) or Běiyuèdàdì (北岳大帝; 'Great Deity of the Northern Peak'), is a deity in Chinese religion, one of the cosmological "Five Forms of the Highest Deity" (五方上帝; Wǔfāng Shàngdì). He is also identified as Zhuānxū (颛顼), today frequently worshipped as Xuánwǔ (玄武; 'Dark Warrior') or Zhēnwǔ (真武), and is associated with the essence of water and winter. His animal form is the Black Dragon and his stellar animal is the tortoise-snake. By virtue of his association with the north, he has been identified and revered frequently as a representation of the supreme God of Heaven.

His planet is Mercury. His animal form is the Black Dragon and his stellar animal is the tortoise-snake.

== Taoist myths involving the Black Deity ==
A Taoist title of Heidi is the "Dark (or Mysterious) Heavenly Highest Deity" (玄天上帝; Xuántiān Shàngdì). According to a myth, during the fall of the Shang, the Demon King ravaged the world, so that Yuanshi Tianzun ordered the Jade Emperor to appoint Heidi as the commander of twelve heavenly legions to fight this evil. Heidi defeated the Demon King and was subsequently granted the title of Mysterious Heavenly Highest Deity. In temples dedicated to him, the bronze tortoise and serpent under the feet of his image signify that the good always prevails over evil.

== Festivals ==
- The day for celebration of Heidi across China is his birthday, on lunar April 21.
- A festival is held on the island of Taipa in Macau. The celebration at the Pak Tai Temple includes an opera-styled performance
- Annual Bun Festival in Cheung Chau Island, Hong Kong, held in front of the Pak Tai Temple.

== Temples in Hong Kong ==
In Hong Kong, it is worshipped among other places in:

Note : A territory-wide grade reassessment of historic buildings is ongoing. The grades listed in the table are based on these updates (8 June 2023). The temples with a "Not listed" status in the table below are not graded and do not appear in the list of historic buildings considered for grading.

Location	Notes	Status	References	Photographs
No. 2 Lung On Street, Wan Chai 22.272876°N 114.173823°E	Wan Chai Pak Tai Temple (灣仔北帝廟), also known as Yuk Hui Kung (玉虛宮) Managed by the Chinese Temples Committee.	Declared		
A Kung Ngam, south coast of Lei Yue Mun Channel 22.283951°N 114.235025°E	Pak Tai Temple The inscription at the front reads 北帝契爺.	Not listed		
Near the southern junction of Old Main Street Aberdeen and Aberdeen Main Street, Aberdeen 22.247261°N 114.156269°E	Pak Tai Temple Part of the "Guardians of Aberdeen" group of small temples and shrines.	Not listed		
Facing Stanley Bay, Stanley 22.217011°N 114.208705°E	Pak Tai Temple, Stanley (赤柱北帝廟) Built in 1805. Managed by Stanley Kai-fong Welfare Association Ltd. by delegation from the Chinese Temples Committee.	Nil grade		
Hok Tsui Village (鶴咀村), D'Aguilar Peninsula 22.209398°N 114.246872°E	Pak Tai Temple	Not listed		
No. 146 Ma Tau Wai Road, Hung Hom 22.31126°N 114.18732°E	Pak Tai Temple, Hok Yuen Kok (鶴園角北帝廟) Built in 1929. It is managed by the Chinese Temples Committee.	Nil grade		
Nos. 196 and 198 Yu Chau Street, Sham Shui Po 22.329333°N 114.162494°E	Sam Tai Tsz Temple and Pak Tai Temple (深水埗三太子及北帝廟) Managed by the Chinese Temples Committee.	Grade II (Sam Tai Tsz Temple); Grade III (Pak Tai Temple)		
Lomond Road Garden, Lomond Road, Ma Tau Wai 22.326235°N 114.18516°E	Sheung Tai Temple (上帝古廟; 'Temple of the Supreme Ruler') Only the stone doorframe of the demolished temple remains.	Grade III		
Mong Tseng Wai (輞井圍), Ping Shan, Yuen Long District 22.476585°N 114.005515°E	Yuen Kwan Tai Temple, Mong Tseng Wai (玄關帝廟) Dedicated to Yuen Tai/Pak Tai and Kwan Tai.	Grade I		
Cheung Shing Street, Yuen Long Kau Hui 22.448276°N 114.032943°E	Yuen Kwan Yi Tai Temple (玄關二帝廟) It was probably built in 1714. Commonly known as Pak Tai Temple, it is dedicated to Yuen Tai/Pak Tai and Kwan Tai (Guan Yu). The temple functions as an ancestral hall and a temple of Sai Pin Wai. Village meetings are also held there.	Grade I		
Yuen Kong Tsuen (元崗村), Pat Heung, Yuen Long District 22.425563°N 114.077705°E	Chung Shing Temple (眾聖宮, Temple of All Saints) The main deity of the temple is Pak Tai with some others including Hau Wong and the Earth God.	Grade III		
Jockey Club Road, north of Fanling Wai 22.499995°N 114.135405°E	Sam Shing Temple (粉嶺三聖宮) For the worship of three deities: Pak Tai (main deity of the temple), Kwan Tai, and Man Cheong (文昌). The temple was moved to So Kwun Po (掃管埔) in the late Ming dynasty (1368-1644) and moved back to the present site in 1948.	Grade III		
Sheung Yeung (上洋), Clear Water Bay 22.311012°N 114.286771°E	Pak Tai Temple, Clear Water Bay	Not listed		
Pak She Street, Tung Wan, Cheung Chau 22.212382°N 114.027852°E	Yuk Hui Temple aka. Pak Tai Temple Managed by the Chinese Temples Committee. The interior of the temple can be explored with Google Street View.	Grade I		
Tai Tei Tong (大地塘), Mui Wo, Lantau Island 22.267548°N 113.991165°E	Pak Tai Temple, Tai Tei Tong	Not listed		

== See also ==
- Xuántiān Shàngdì
- Chinese mythology
- Bok Kai Temple (California, USA)
