= Hong Kong police blue-dye water cannon incident at Kowloon Mosque =

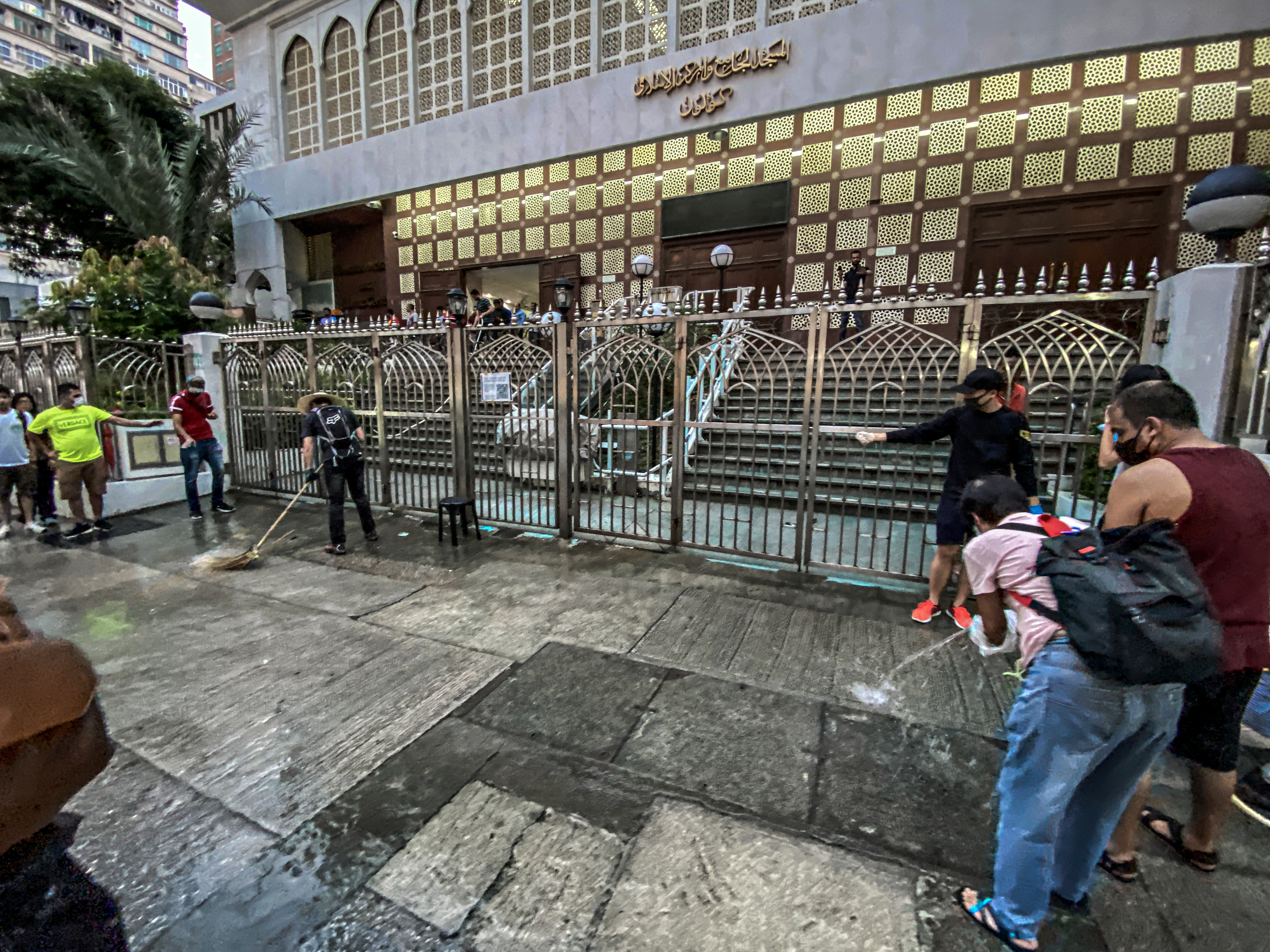
After the entrance of the Kowloon Mosque was sprayed twice by police with blue-dyed tear-water during the Kowloon march of the 2019–2020 Hong Kong protests on 20 October 2019, worshippers and members of the public cleaned the area afterwards.

The Hong Kong police blue-dye water cannon incident at Kowloon Mosque refers to an incident during the 2019–2020 Hong Kong protests on 20 October 2019, in which the Hong Kong Police Force used a Specialised Crowd Management Vehicle (water cannon vehicle) to fire blue-dyed tear-water twice at the Kowloon Mosque and Islamic Centre, where no protesters were reported to be present. In addition to causing the mosque to be "dyed blue", people outside the mosque were also hit, including former Indian Association chairman Mohan Chugani, members of Hong Kong Unison, several members of the public, and Hong Kong Legislative Council member Jeremy Tam. Some of those hit later went to hospital for medical examination. The incident drew criticism from various parties over the police's actions.

== Incident ==
External videos
- Moment when a water cannon was fired at the mosque
- Hong Kong protests: Kowloon Mosque hit by Hong Kong police water cannon, staining its gate and floor blue (BBC)
- Police water cannon fires blue-dyed water at mosque, suspected to be political retaliation

On 20 October 2019, a march originally organised by the Civil Human Rights Front did not receive a letter of no objection from the police, but large numbers of protesters still took to the streets that day. After the march ended, many protesters remained in the Tsim Sha Tsui area and clashed with police outside the Tsim Sha Tsui Police Station.

At 4:00 p.m., several ethnic minorities and a number of Chinese people were standing outside the Kowloon Mosque and Islamic Centre to protect the mosque from damage and to ensure that no one would attack ethnic minority people, after rumours had circulated before the march that South Asian ethnic minorities might be targeted. According to Hong Kong Unison, the people present were not wearing Respirator or other equipment commonly used by protesters, and were not protesters. The Hong Kong Police deployed Specialised Crowd Management Vehicles, commonly known as water cannon vehicles, belonging to the Police Tactical Unit to disperse people suspected of taking part in an unlawful assembly. As a water cannon vehicle advanced along Nathan Road in Tsim Sha Tsui and passed outside the Kowloon Mosque, it fired blue-dyed tear-water at the mosque. A few seconds after the water cannon stopped firing, officers on the vehicle shouted loudly, and the vehicle then fired a second time. The spray hit some of the people who had been standing outside the mosque to protect it, including several elderly ethnic minority leaders in Hong Kong, such as Mohan Chugani, former chairman of the Indian Association and the 73-year-old brother of media worker Michael Chugani, members of Hong Kong Unison, several members of the public, and Hong Kong Legislative Council member Jeremy Tam. Some of those hit by the water cannon coughed and vomited, while others were injured and sent to hospital. The mosque was also "dyed blue". After the incident, members of the public went to the mosque voluntarily to help clean the blue dye, and the area was largely cleaned up by shortly after 8:00 p.m.

In addition to the mosque, the nearby St Andrew's Church, the oldest Christian church in Kowloon, was also stained blue, with blue liquid residue left on the church's exterior wall and the pavement.

== Aftermath ==
=== Police response on the day ===
On the evening of the incident, the police responded on their Facebook page, stating that "coloured water accidentally hit the entrance and front gate of the Kowloon Mosque. The Police contacted the Chief Imam of the mosque and Muslim community leaders immediately after the incident to explain the matter and express concern." The post also included an English version: "Coloured water was used for effecting the dispersal, which accidentally affected the entrance and front gate of the Kowloon Mosque." The post did not include an apology. At around 9:00 p.m., Yau Tsim District Commander Ho Yun-sing and Police Public Relations Branch Senior Superintendent Yu Hoi-kwan arrived at the mosque with more than ten plain-clothes officers carrying towels and buckets. They entered the mosque for about ten minutes. Afterwards, several officers cleaned the stair handrails with towels for about five minutes. The police left at 10:17 p.m. and did not answer reporters' questions throughout. Mosque staff later said that the police had apologised inside the mosque. Some bystanders criticised the police as "putting on an act", as members of the public had already voluntarily cleaned the blue stains from the mosque in the afternoon.

=== Apologies by officials ===
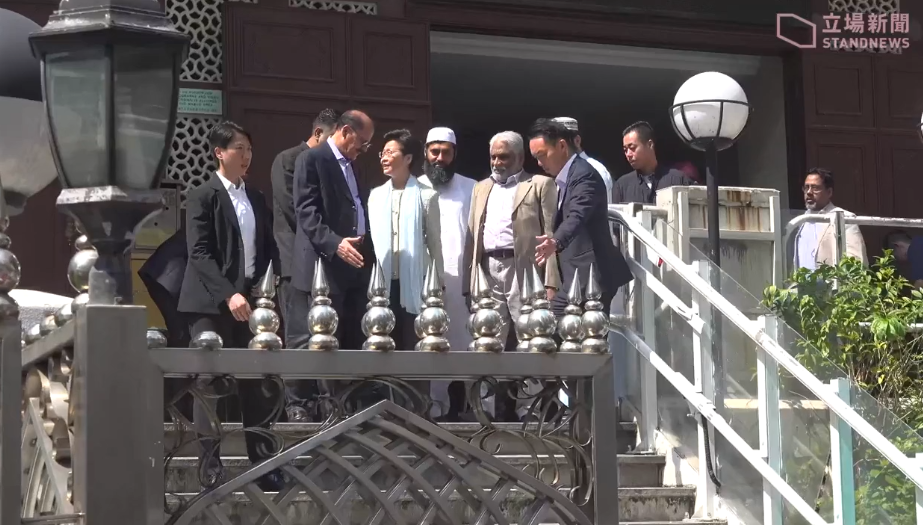
Chief Executive Carrie Lam leaving the Kowloon Mosque and Islamic Centre.

On 21 October, Chief Executive Carrie Lam, Commissioner of Police Stephen Lo Wai-chung and others arrived at the Kowloon Mosque and Islamic Centre at around 11:00 a.m. and stayed for about 25 minutes. Afterwards, the mosque's Chief Imam, Muhammad Arshad, and others told the media that Lam and the police had sincerely apologised over the incident, explaining that the mosque had been accidentally hit by the water cannon vehicle. The mosque accepted the apology, and Muslim representatives again thanked members of the Hong Kong public for helping to clean the mosque. However, Mohan Chugani, who had been hit by the water cannon, said that he would not accept the Hong Kong Police's explanation. He said that the water cannon vehicle had deliberately stopped and fired at the mosque's main entrance, and stated that he no longer trusted the Hong Kong Police. He also said that Lam had called him to apologise, but that he would not accept the apology.

Regarding St Andrew's Church, the Hong Kong Sheng Kung Hui said that on the morning after the incident, a police officer called to apologise for the blue water sprayed by the police water cannon vehicle the previous day, which had stained the exterior of the church. The church said the officer emphasised that the staining of the church had not been intentional. A spokesperson said that the church had accepted the police's explanation and apology, forgiven the act, and noted that only part of the church's exterior walls and gates had been stained blue and that they had later been cleaned. Later that afternoon, the police said that the water cannon had been used because "rioters" had acted illegally and used violence in the area, and that the police therefore had to enforce the law and use force to disperse them. Mohan Chugani, who had been hit by the water cannon and was injured and sought medical treatment, disputed the explanation. He said that there were no protesters near the mosque at the time, that he was not wearing black clothing or a face mask, and that he did not understand why the police had treated a 73-year-old man in that way.

The police said that they had done nothing wrong, stating that there were still people remaining on the streets at the time and that the decision to use the water cannon was "unavoidable". Wilson Wong Wai-shun, Senior Superintendent of the Operations Wing, said that all responsibility should not be placed on the officers. Superintendent Rupert Dover of the Cyber Security and Technology Crime Bureau, who is of non-Chinese ethnicity, said that the water cannon had been fired to "protect the mosque". Jeremy Tam criticised the police's explanation as "absurd", saying that there had been no protesters at the scene and that the police had unreasonably attacked members of the public who were present.

=== Complaints filed by victims ===
On 22 October, former Indian Association chairman Mohan Chugani, Hong Kong Legislative Council member Jeremy Tam, and the executive director of Hong Kong Unison, all of whom had been sprayed by the blue-dyed tear-water from the water cannon vehicle, filed a formal complaint with the Complaints Against Police Office. They complained that on 20 October the police had used a water cannon vehicle without reasonable grounds, injuring innocent members of the public. Chugani said that he had felt unwell after being sprayed and that it felt as if he had been "burned by fire". He said that there had not been any protesters gathered outside the mosque at the time, disagreed with the police's claim that "rioters" had been present, and said that the claim was completely untrue. He said that it was improper for the water cannon vehicle to fire water at the mosque, and also questioned the professionalism of the officers operating the vehicle that day. Tam said that the members of the public had merely been standing on the pavement and talking, and had not charged at anyone or committed any illegal acts. He believed that the police had breached the guidelines on the use of water cannon vehicles.

=== Alleged intimidation of Mohan Chugani by Vincent Cheng ===
Former Indian Association chairman Mohan Chugani, who had been hit by the water cannon, later told the media that DAB Legislative Council member Vincent Cheng Wing-shun had visited him at his home the previous night and warned him to be careful with what he said. Chugani described the remarks as "sarcastic". Cheng later said that he had only been offering a well-intentioned reminder and hoped that Chugani's remarks would not further divide Hong Kong society.

=== The Washington Post coverage ===
On 25 December 2019, The Washington Post published an in-depth report stating that it had obtained more than 100 pages of police use-of-force guidelines and other documents, and had invited nine international experts to review 65 incidents involving the use of force by police. The report said that police use of force complied with the guidelines in only 8% of the incidents. Regarding the use of the water cannon vehicle, the experts criticised the police's actions as violating the principles stated by the police, saying that the people standing on the pavement at the time posed no threat and that the use of the water cannon vehicle breached the principles of necessity and proportionality.

== Reactions ==
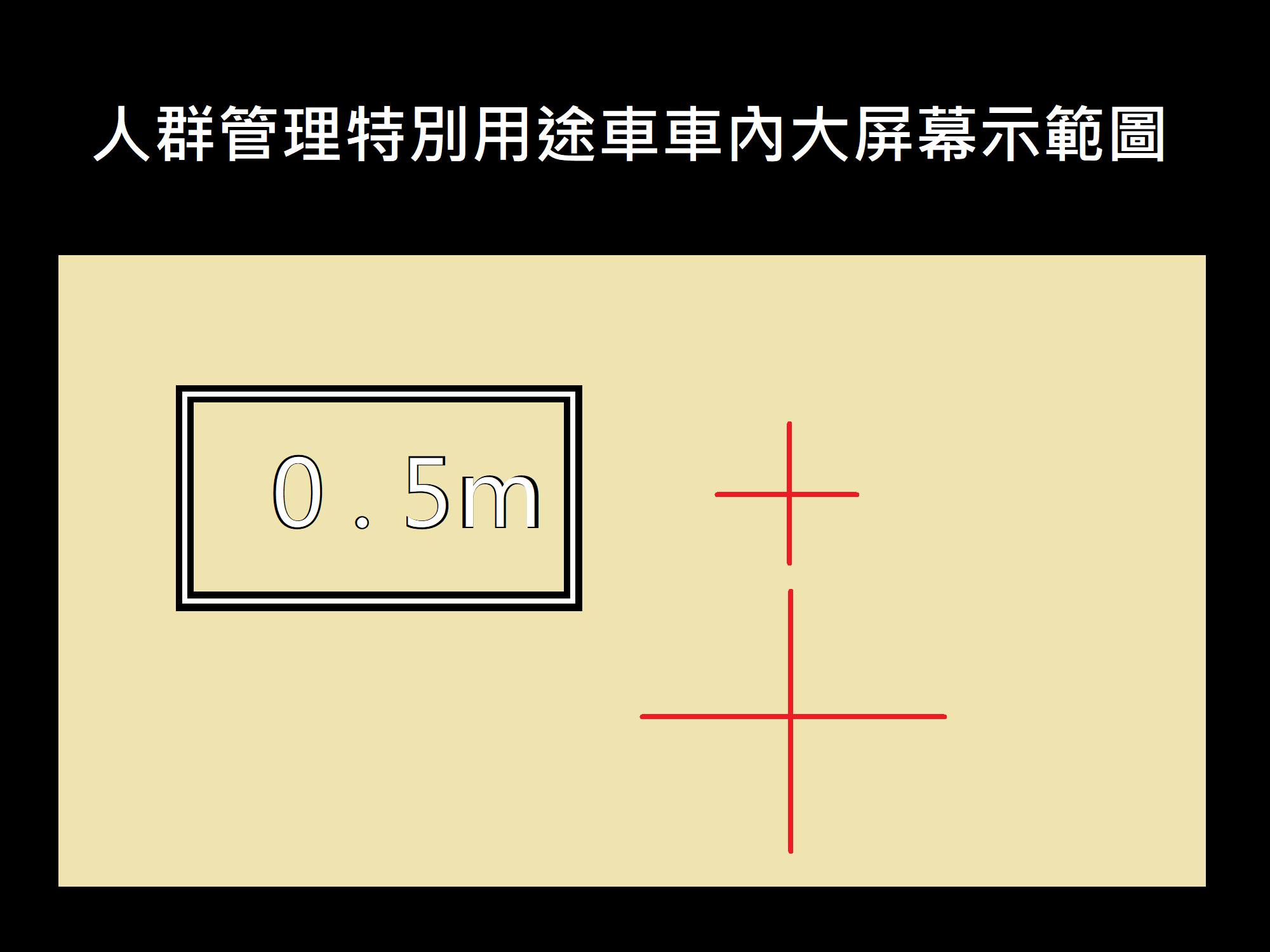
Illustration of the large display screen inside a Specialised Crowd Management Vehicle, based on an image published by the Hong Kong Economic Times.

Hong Kong Unison issued a statement condemning the police's actions. The organisation said that the police had stained the mosque's facilities with blue-dyed water without reasonable justification, and that the act insulted a place of worship and disregarded religious freedom. It strongly condemned the police and demanded that the police immediately apologise to the victims and the mosque, as well as give a clear account of their actions. Hong Kong Unison's executive director, Phyllis Cheung, said that the police had arrived at the mosque only several hours after the incident and left after cleaning for a short time, showing a lack of sincerity, as members of the public had already voluntarily completed the cleanup. She also stressed that she did not want the incident to escalate into a religious conflict, and only hoped that the police would clearly explain the cause of the incident.

Executive Council member Regina Ip said that the police should apologise.

The Hong Kong Islamic Youth Association published a post on Facebook, stating: "A picture is worth a thousand words, "accident" happened today and who should be blamed for the unfortunate situation? Allah (swt) knows the best!!" The post then continued in Chinese: "Thank you to every Hong Kong citizen who helped clean the mosque. The mosque belongs to every Muslim and is a sacred place where we worship Allah. We are deeply saddened that the mosque was 'dyed blue'. As for the real reason behind this incident, only Allah knows the truth." The post also included photos showing the blue water from the water cannon vehicle hitting the mosque, as well as members of the public voluntarily helping to clean the mosque. It later quoted the Quran in response to the incident.

We did test those before them, and Allah will surely make evident those who are truthful, and He will surely make evident the liars. Or do those who do evil deeds think they can outrun Us? Evil is what they judge.

— Al-Ankabut

وَلَقَدْ فَتَنَّا الَّذِينَ مِن قَبْلِهِمْ ۖ فَلَيَعْلَمَنَّ اللَّهُ الَّذِينَ صَدَقُوا وَلَيَعْلَمَنَّ الْكَاذِبِينَ
أَمْ حَسِبَ الَّذِينَ يَعْمَلُونَ السَّيِّئَاتِ أَن يَسْبِقُونَا ۚ سَاءَ مَا يَحْكُمُونَ

— العنكبوت

Hong Kong Pakistani businessman Phillip Khan criticised the incident as an attack on the mosque, saying that the Hong Kong Police were challenging and insulting Islam. He said that the police, rather than anyone else, were the troublemakers, and criticised the police for failing to respect other people's religions. Although the Hong Kong Basic Law provides for the protection of religious freedom, he said, the Hong Kong Police showed no respect for it.

== Controversy over women's clothing when entering the mosque ==
Police Public Relations Branch Senior Superintendent Yu Hoi-kwan, who is female, entered the mosque on the evening of 20 October without wearing a headscarf and while wearing a short-sleeved shirt. On the morning of 21 October, when Chief Executive Carrie Lam, Yu and other senior police officers visited the mosque again, they wore scarves around their necks and white long-sleeved shirts. Lam removed her shoes when entering the mosque, but did not cover her head. Some internet users criticised the two women for entering the mosque without covering their heads, saying that this was disrespectful to Muslims. They said that even Queen Elizabeth II and Catherine, Duchess of Cambridge would wear headscarves when entering a mosque as a sign of respect for Muslims.

Rupert Dover, a Superintendent of the Cyber Security and Technology Crime Bureau who is Muslim, responded that the female officers present were not Muslim, and that the officers and officials had not entered the prayer area but only the office area. He therefore said that there had been no disrespect. According to Islam in Hong Kong, non-Muslims entering a mosque do not need to wear a headscarf or perform ablution, but visitors should not dress too revealingly.

== Gallery ==
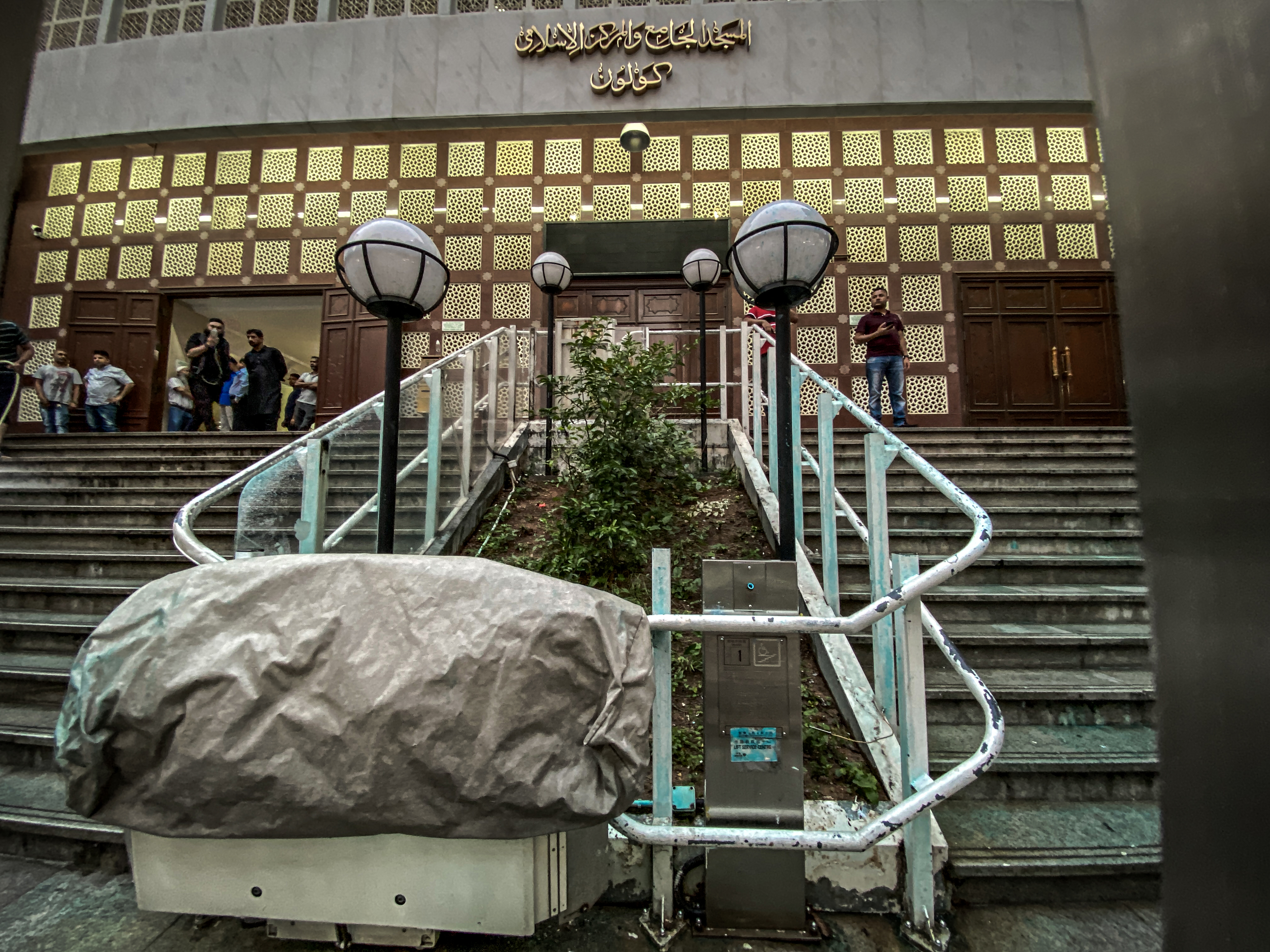
Blue water stains covering the staircases at the main entrance

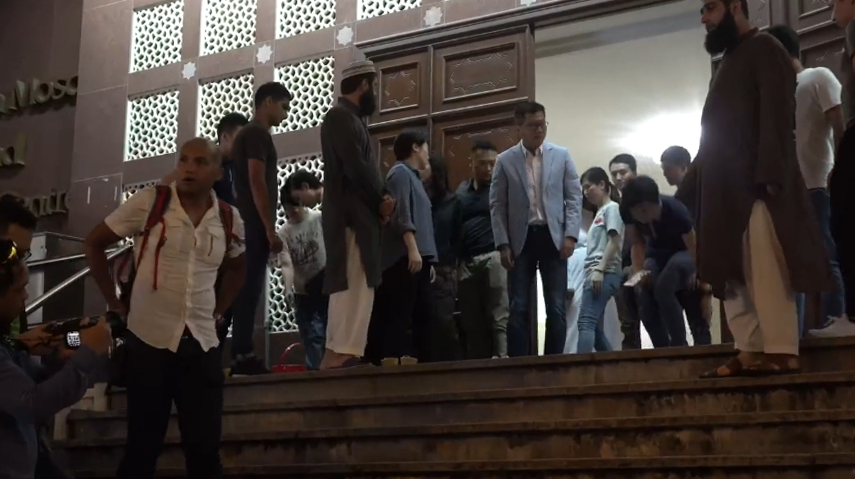
Yau Tsim District Commander Ho Yun-sing, Police Public Relations Branch Senior Superintendent Yu Hoi-kwan, and several plain-clothes officers visiting the mosque in the evening

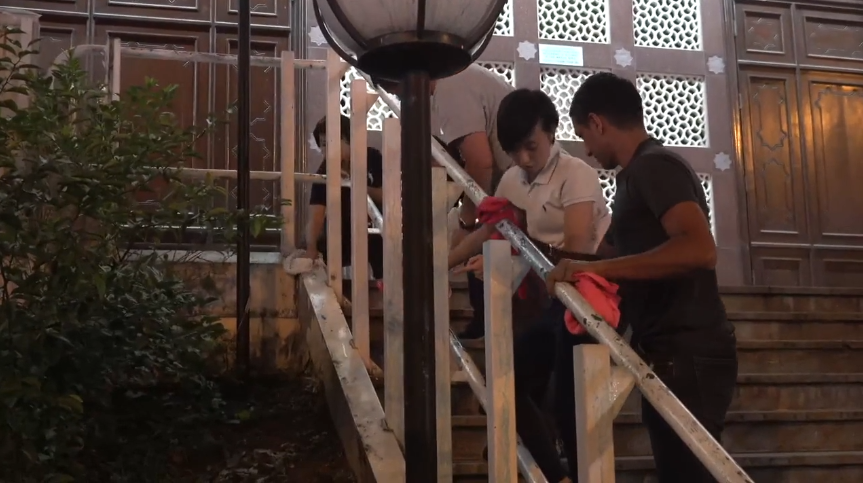
Police officers wiping the staircases at the main entrance with towels for five minutes before leaving
