= Specialised crowd management vehicles =

Anti-riot vehicles of the Hong Kong Police Force

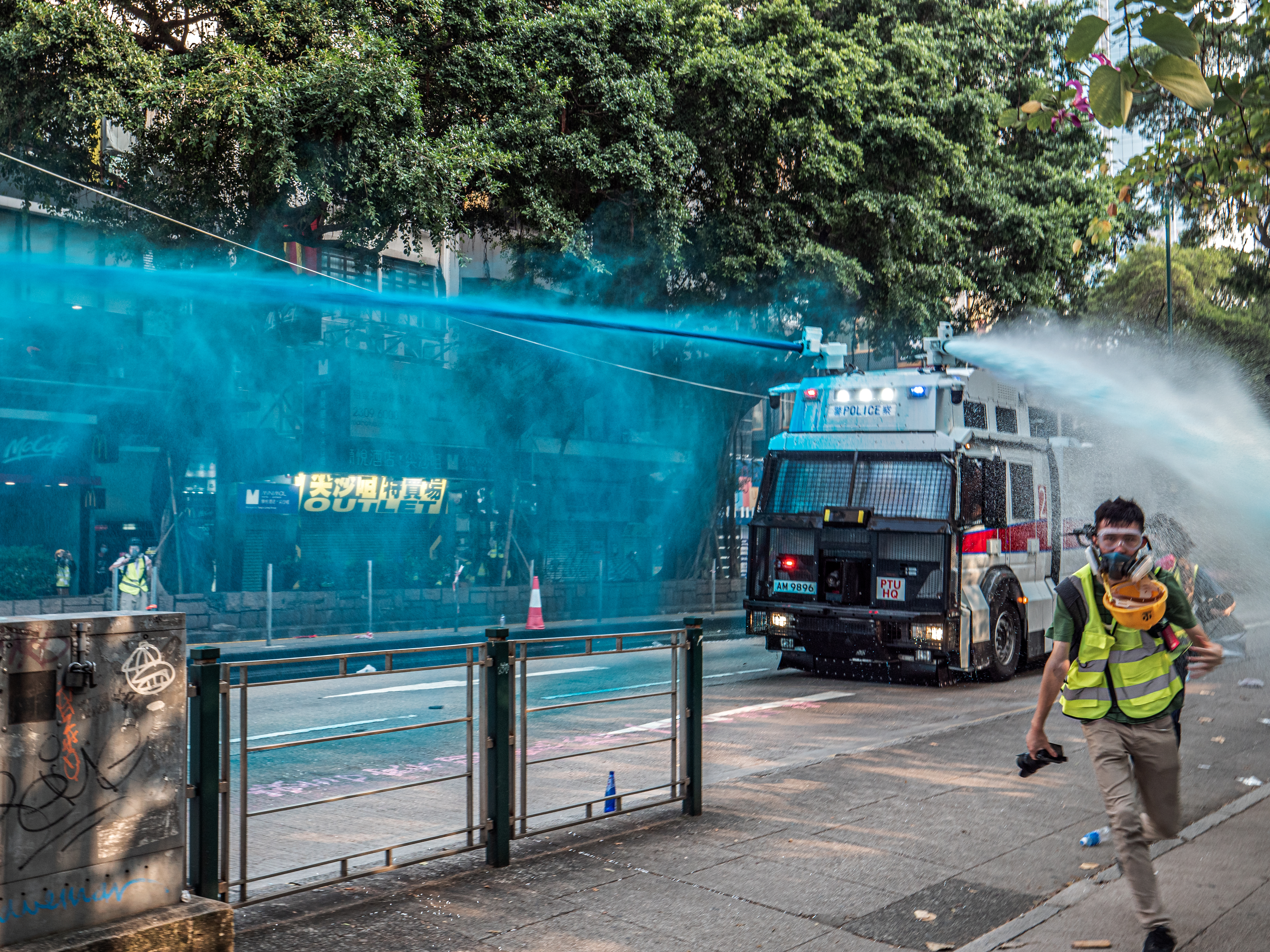
No. 2 water cannon vehicle discharging blue "coloured water" during the Kowloon protest on 20 October 2019

Specialised crowd management vehicles, commonly known as "water cannon vehicles", are vehicles procured by the Hong Kong Police Force, with three units purchased for HK$16.59 million and another three units purchased for HK$9.9 million. (Note: The police originally planned to spend HK$27 million to purchase the three water cannon vehicles. However, according to online information from the Government Logistics Department, the three vehicles cost HK$16.59 million, nearly 40% less than the original budget.) Water cannon vehicles are equipped with water-spraying devices, which may be used when necessary to disperse demonstrators using violent force, to stop acts that seriously endanger public safety and public order, and, in doing so, to create a safe distance between demonstrators and police officers in order to reduce the chance of injuries caused by direct confrontation between demonstrators and police officers.

On 25 August 2019, during the Tsuen Wan, Kwai Chung and Tsing Yi march, water cannon vehicles were deployed for the first time and discharged water twice, first in an unsuccessful attempt to clear obstacles and later to disperse demonstrators. The police deployed water cannon vehicles again during the demonstration on 31 August 2019 and discharged water three times, including blue-coloured water on two occasions, marking the first time that the police had used water cannon vehicles to discharge "coloured water". Human rights organisations and pro-democracy groups in Hong Kong questioned the power of water cannon vehicles, citing overseas reports that they could cause injuries, and called on the police to publish the guidelines for their use, but the police refused to do so. The police were also accused by organisations such as Human Rights Watch of using water cannon vehicles to spray chemical agents that caused a burning sensation on the skin. The incident on 20 October 2019, during a march in Kowloon, in which water cannon vehicles twice sprayed blue-coloured tear-agent water at the Kowloon Mosque when no demonstrators were present, also sparked controversy.

== History ==
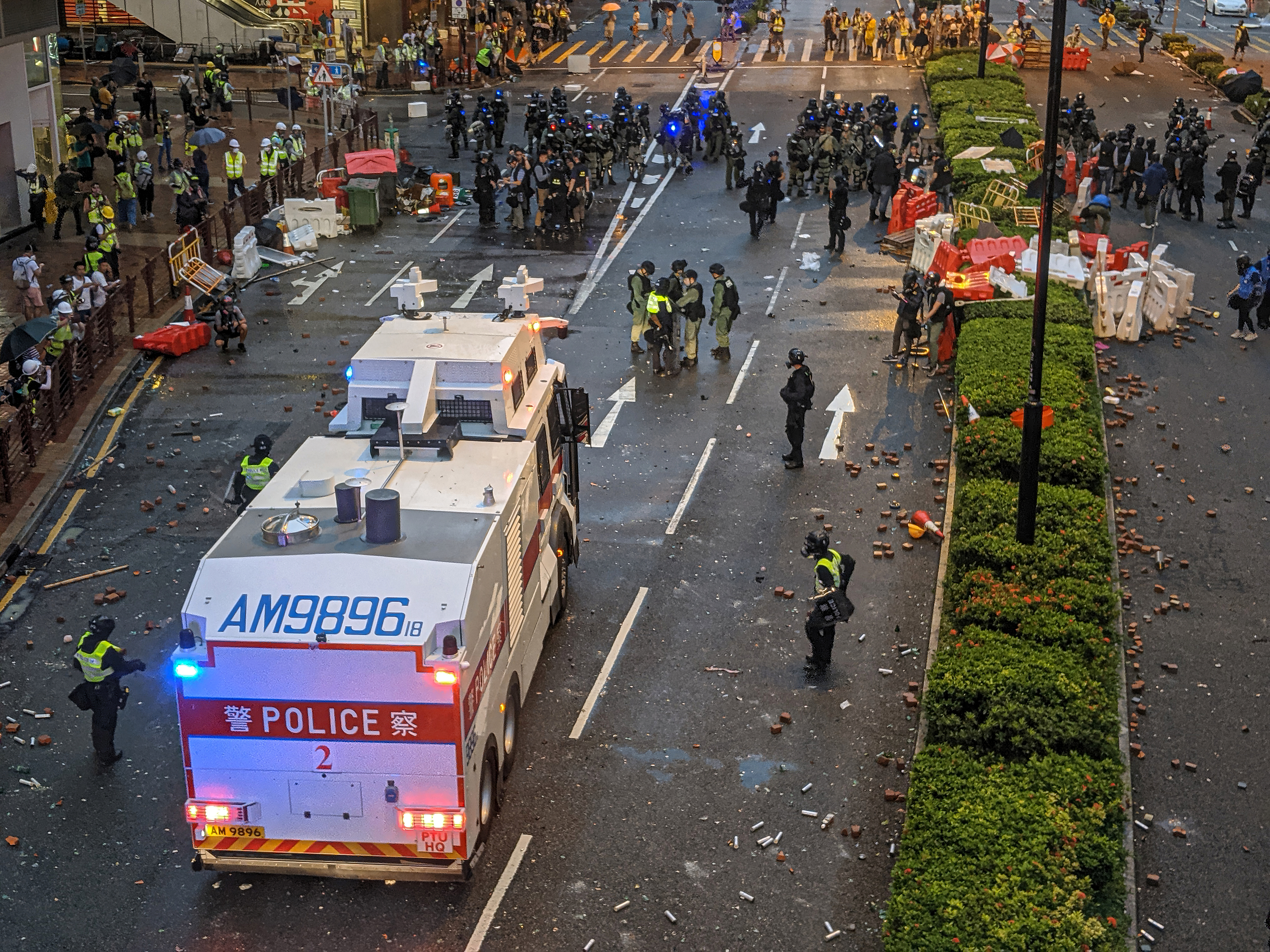
Water cannon vehicles were deployed for the first time during the Tsuen Wan, Kwai Chung and Tsing Yi march on 25 August 2019. The image shows No. 2 water cannon vehicle.

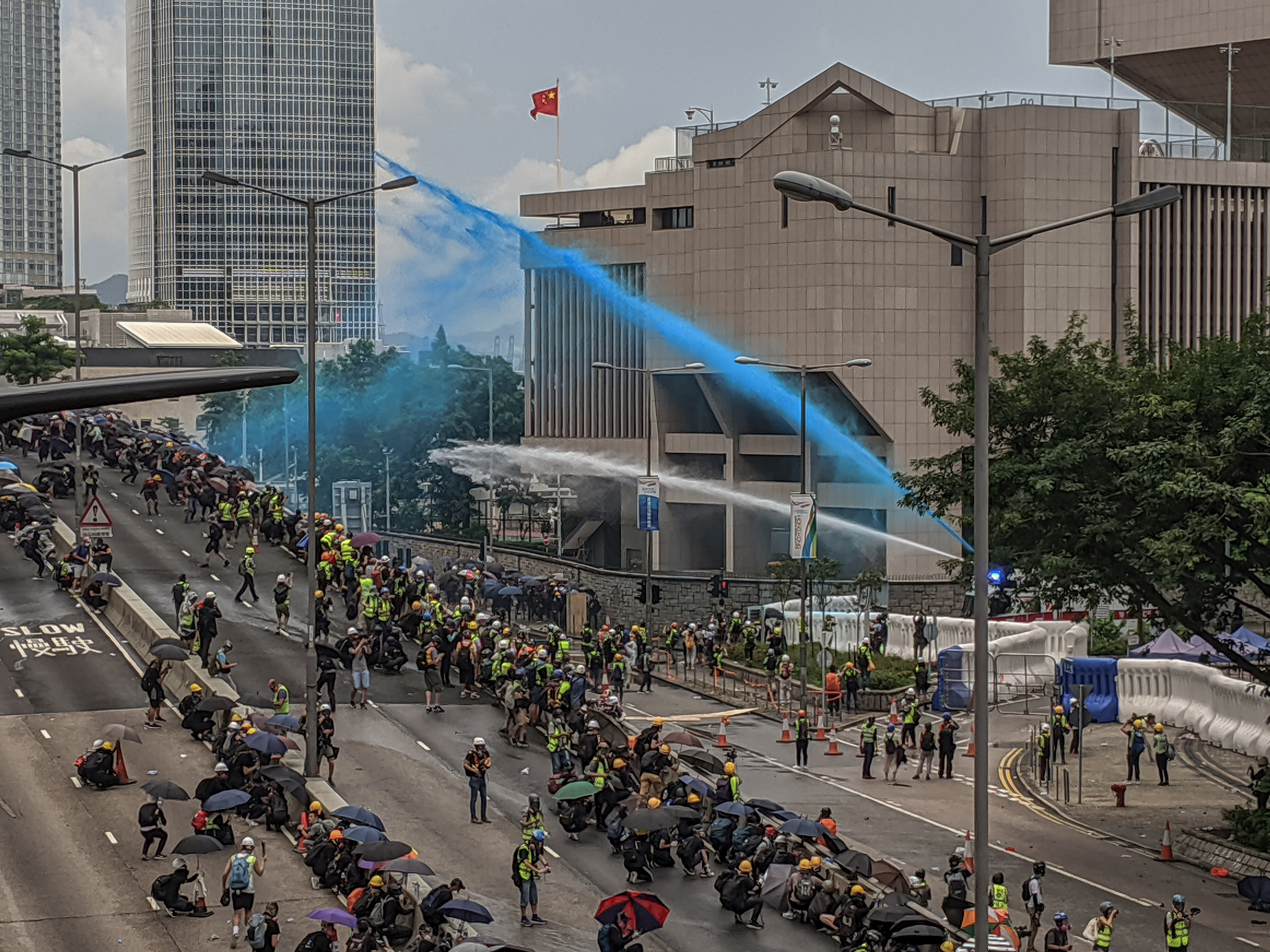
Water cannon vehicles discharged blue "coloured water" for the first time during the Admiralty protest on 31 August 2019. No. 2 water cannon vehicle is shown on the right.

Following the 2014 Occupy movement, the police planned to spend HK$27 million to purchase three water cannon vehicles. In January 2018, officials from the Security Bureau told the Legislative Council that the water cannon vehicles were expected to be delivered in the first half of that year and enter service by the end of the year, and that guidelines and training programmes were being drawn up. The water cannon vehicles were procured through Zung Fu. The vehicles used truck chassis manufactured by Mercedes-Benz, with their bodies and equipment fitted by a French specialist vehicle manufacturer. Free West Media cited a report by the French news outlet CNews, stating that in June 2019, French media had made enquiries with Armoric Holding, a local supplier of specialist vehicles. The company's chief executive, Frédéric Louis, confirmed in an interview that its subsidiary vehicle manufacturer, Essonne Sécurité, had received an order from Hong Kong in 2016 to manufacture three riot-control vehicles equipped with water cannons for the Hong Kong Police Force. The contract was worth a total of €2 million, and the three water cannon vehicles had already been delivered.

On 22 May 2018, the first water cannon vehicle arrived by sea at Kwai Tsing Container Terminals that morning. After being unloaded, it was transported to Zung Fu's commercial vehicle maintenance centre in the North District of the New Territories. In June of the same year, the Security Bureau stated in a written reply to a question raised by Legislative Council member Claudia Mo that the remaining two water cannon vehicles were expected to be delivered within that month at the earliest. In January 2019, the then Commissioner of Police, Stephen Lo Wai-chung, said that the police were preparing operational guidelines and relevant training courses for the three water cannon vehicles purchased earlier, drawing on overseas examples. He said that his colleagues had visited France for an exchange in December of the previous year, and that once the guidelines and training courses had been completed, training would be provided for police officers. He also expected the water cannon vehicles to enter service as early as the second quarter of that year. Lo added that the police would later demonstrate the operation of the water cannon vehicles and provide a guided tour for the Independent Police Complaints Council, Legislative Council members and the media.

=== Road testing and demonstration ===
On 30 July 2019, the water cannon vehicles formally underwent road testing. That morning, signs reading "road test" were placed on the front and rear of the vehicles as they were driven in circles inside the Fanling Police Operations Base. They later left the base and underwent road testing on Castle Peak Road, but did not test-fire water; the water cannons were covered with green cloth. At 1:35 p.m. and 3:00 p.m., the water cannon vehicles twice travelled along Castle Peak Road towards Fanling Highway, passing through Kwu Tung and San Tin, before turning back near Fairview Park to return to the Fanling Police Tactical Unit base for road testing. The first road test lasted about one hour. During the return journey of the second road test, the cloth cover on the left water cannon came loose, exposing a white water-spraying device. The vehicles travelled at an average speed of about 40 km/h throughout the road tests. The three water cannon vehicles were stored at the Fanling Police Tactical Unit base.

On 12 August, the police formally demonstrated the power of the water cannon vehicles to members of the Legislative Council Panel on Security. On the same day, the then Deputy Commissioner of Police, Chris Tang, said that the three water cannon vehicles could be deployed at any time, and that the police would use tear gas or water cannon vehicles to disperse crowds depending on operational needs. During the demonstration, the police fired continuous jets of water at distances of 20, 30 and 40 metres. After being hit by the water jets, the mannequins immediately moved about 8 metres backwards.

=== Specifications ===
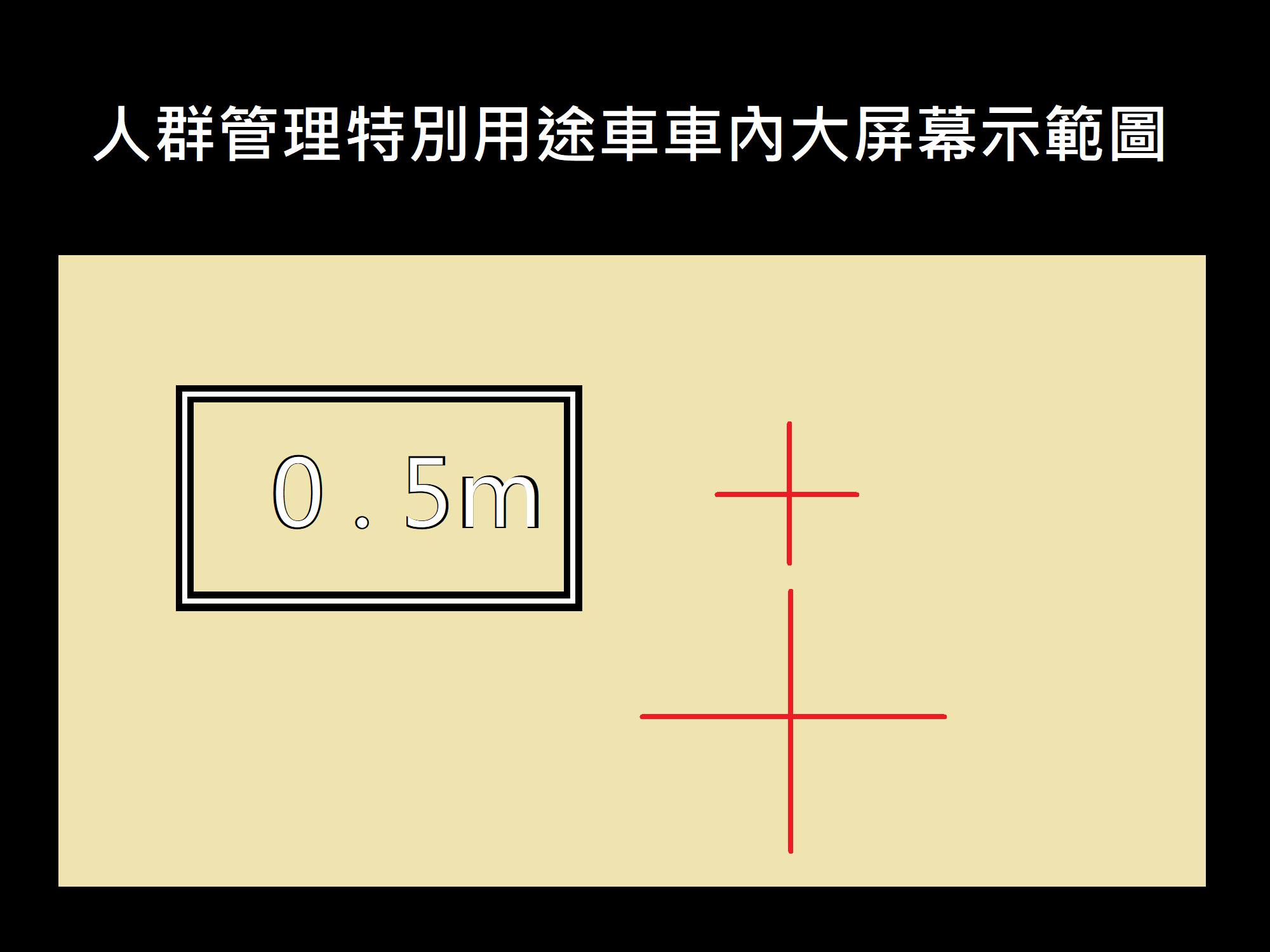
Illustration of the large screen inside a water cannon vehicle, based on an image published by the Hong Kong Economic Times

The water cannon vehicles are 8 metres long and 2.55 metres wide, and are equipped with a 6,500-litre water tank and a storage device for tear-agent solution. Each vehicle can be fitted with 15 water cannons of different sizes, including two main cannons mounted on the roof. Each main cannon can discharge 1,200 litres of water per minute, with water pressure reaching 1,000 kPa, and can rotate 360 degrees. The roof-mounted main cannons are controlled from the driver's seat using gun-shaped joysticks. The two cannons were required to be equipped with searchlights, laser rangefinders and video cameras with a minimum illuminance of 0.5 lux, in order to ensure that targets could still be aimed at accurately in dark environments. The water jets discharged by the vehicles have different modes and uses, including different ranges, spraying modes and jet-stream modes. In addition to spraying water, the vehicles can also discharge water mixed with dye or tear agent, and can also spray foam. The vehicles are equipped with an air filtration system to prevent toxic gases from entering the body of the vehicle. They are also fitted with a public address system, which can be used to broadcast police advice, warnings or other messages to protesters. There are also 360-degree video cameras on the left and right sides of the roof of each water cannon vehicle.

Each water cannon vehicle has five seats. When deployed, each vehicle is operated by four police officers: one officer at the rank of station sergeant is responsible for the overall operation of the vehicle; two officers at the rank of sergeant control the two water-spraying devices on the roof; and one police constable is responsible for driving. The remaining seat is kept as a spare seat for contingency use.

As the water tank of each water cannon vehicle has a capacity of 6,500 litres, while the two roof-mounted water cannons alone are each required to discharge at least 1,200 litres of water per minute, Lo Kok-keung, a fellow of the Institution of Mechanical Engineers in the United Kingdom, estimated that the water in the tank would be exhausted within three minutes. He also expected that the vehicles would need to be continuously connected to street hydrants to replenish their water supply while deployed.

According to a report by the Hong Kong Economic Times, footage filmed by City Broadcast showing the interior of a water cannon vehicle indicated that the external cameras of the vehicle were connected in real time to a large screen inside the vehicle. The large screen clearly displayed the rangefinder and a red crosshair, while police officers could use control levers to shift between different angles and targets. The faces of people in the crowd on the street were generally clearly visible, and when vehicles or other objects passed by, or when the angle was slightly adjusted, the rangefinder figures were updated immediately.

=== Entry into service ===
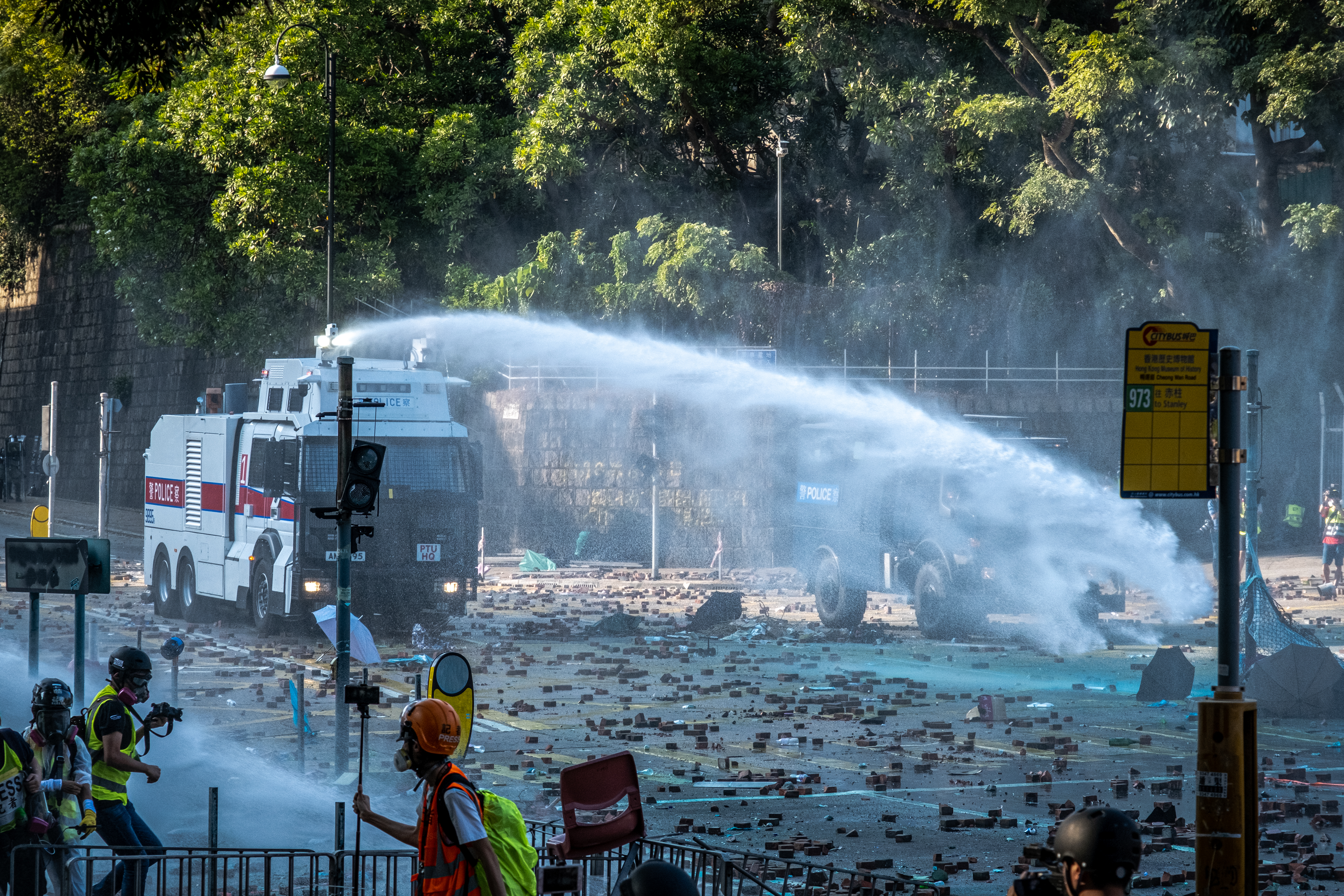
Hong Kong police using a water cannon vehicle to disperse protesters during the Siege of the Hong Kong Polytechnic University

On the afternoon of 25 August 2019, a march and rally was held in the Tsuen Wan District and Kwai Tsing District in the New Territories, during the Tsuen Wan, Kwai Chung and Tsing Yi march. Water cannon vehicles were deployed for the first time. At around 6:10 p.m., a water cannon vehicle sprayed water at water-filled barriers on Tai Ho Road in an unsuccessful attempt to clear obstacles, and at around 6:55 p.m. it sprayed water on Texaco Road to disperse protesters.On 31 August, clashes between police and protesters broke out in the Admiralty area. The police deployed water cannon vehicles for the second time and fired water cannons three times, including blue-coloured water on two occasions. This was the first time that water cannon vehicles had discharged blue "coloured water"; during the operation, the vehicles also sprayed water into the air and used a jet-stream mode. On 20 October, while handling protests during the anti-extradition bill movement, the police twice used water cannon vehicles to spray blue-dyed water containing tear agent at the Kowloon Mosque and Islamic Centre, where no protesters were present. The mosque was stained blue, and people outside the mosque were hit; some of them had to go to hospital for medical examination. The incident prompted criticism of the police's actions from various parties.

=== Newly purchased water cannon vehicles ===
In December 2021, the police spent a further HK$9.9 million to purchase three new water cannon vehicles manufactured by Beijing Anlong Technology Group, using truck chassis produced by China National Heavy Duty Truck Group. The new water cannon vehicles were custom-made according to police requirements and Hong Kong's operating environment, and were therefore smaller than the French-made vehicles.

== Rules on use and effects ==
=== Rules on use ===
According to a discussion paper provided by the police to the Legislative Council Panel on Security for its discussion on water cannon vehicles on 7 May 2019, the vehicles may be used when necessary to disperse demonstrators using violent force, to stop acts that seriously endanger public safety and public order, and, in doing so, to create a safe distance between demonstrators and police officers in order to reduce the risk of injuries caused by direct confrontation between demonstrators and police officers. Before using water cannon vehicles, the police conduct a risk assessment. The police would only consider deploying water cannon vehicles if they believed that widespread or serious public disorder was likely to occur or had already occurred, causing serious casualties, extensive property damage, or major impacts on public order or public safety, such as traffic obstruction caused by the occupation of major roads. A field commander at the rank of chief superintendent or above may request the deployment of water cannon vehicles according to the actual situation at the scene. Formal deployment must be approved by the Assistant Commissioner of Police (Operations). A warning is required before the water-spraying devices are used, and their use must stop immediately once the lawful purpose has been achieved. When water cannon vehicles are used, the water pressure is adjusted from low to high, and the water is directed mainly at the lower limbs. Human rights organisations and pro-democracy groups in Hong Kong questioned the power of the water cannon vehicles, citing overseas reports that they could cause injuries, and called on the police to publish the guidelines for their use, but the police refused to do so.

=== Effects of use ===
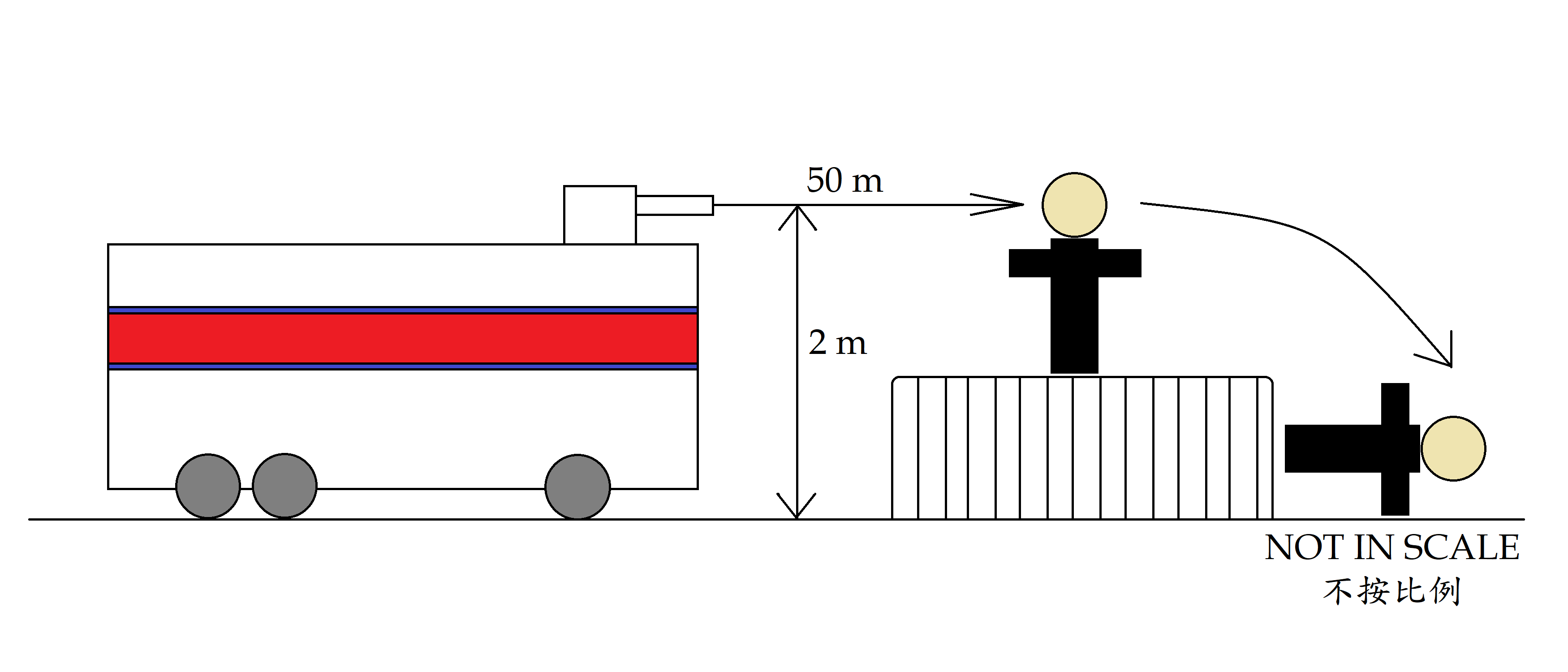
Illustration of the force of a water cannon vehicle, showing that a protester can be knocked to the ground by water projected from a height of two metres

Before the water cannon vehicles officially entered service, Lo Kok-keung, a fellow of the Institution of Mechanical Engineers, and Albert Lai, policy convenor of the Professional Commons and an engineer, calculated based on information in the government tender documents that, when fired at different angles and distances within 50 metres, the force of the water cannon would reach 145 to 200 pounds. People whose body weight was lower than the force of the water could be knocked into the air. Emergency medicine specialist Fung Hin-tat said that if water with such force hit a person's limbs or torso, it would at most cause bruising, but if it was fired directly at the eyes, as the retina and eyeball are soft tissues, it could cause damage, temporarily affect vision, or even cause permanent blindness. If the water contained tear gas, it could cause inflammation of both eyes, and if it entered the nasal cavity, it could also cause wheezing. During a demonstration of the power of the water cannon vehicles to members of the Legislative Council Panel on Security on 12 August 2019, the then deputy principal of the Police Tactical Unit, Chan Kin-kwok, said that anyone hit by a water cannon vehicle would feel uncomfortable and become wet.

After the water cannon vehicles officially entered service, on 20 October, while handling protests during the anti-extradition bill movement, the police twice used water cannon vehicles to spray blue-dyed water containing tear agent at the Kowloon Mosque and Islamic Centre, where no protesters were present. People outside the mosque were hit, and some of them had to go to hospital for medical examination. On the afternoon of 17 November, a photojournalist from Mad Dog Daily was hit by a jet of water from a water cannon vehicle outside Hong Kong Polytechnic University. He suffered bleeding from the head and went into shock at the scene before being sent to hospital for treatment. Mad Dog Daily editor-in-chief Leung Kam-cheung later issued a statement saying that the journalist had been diagnosed with a fracture at the back of the skull and bleeding in the brain, and that surgery was required to remove a blood clot. His waist was also seriously injured.

=== Use with coloured water ===
The police also added coloured water to the water discharged by water cannon vehicles in order to identify protesters. Before the water cannon vehicles officially entered service, former superintendent Lai Ka-chi, who had served as head of the Airport Security Unit and helped establish the Counter Terrorism Response Unit, said that if coloured water was added to the water cannon vehicles, the police would need to study how to avoid ordinary citizens or passing vehicles being hit by the "coloured water" and mistakenly identified as protesters. He believed that it would only be used on relatively open roads and when protesters were relatively concentrated. During the police–protester clashes in the Admiralty area on 31 August, the police used water cannon vehicles to discharge blue-coloured water for the first time. The arm of a protester who was hit by the police's "coloured water" had visible blue marks, and the protester said that they felt a stinging sensation. The road surface on Harcourt Road was stained blue by the coloured water, which could not be washed away even in heavy rain. The police had said that the "coloured water" was a food dye harmless to humans, and that it might remain on the surface of clothing and skin so that the police could identify whether protesters had been present at the scene. Preliminary test results released by Greenpeace in October 2019 on the "coloured water" discharged by police water cannon vehicles showed that it contained adhesive, and Greenpeace suggested that the "coloured water" might contain harmful tear-agent solution or two other toxic tear-inducing compounds.

== Controversies ==
In January 2018, Legislative Council member Kenneth Leung moved a motion under Article 73 of the Basic Law to summon Stephen Lo Wai-chung to testify before the Legislative Council and explain the purpose of the police purchase of water cannon vehicles. Leung also raised concerns that, given Hong Kong's narrow streets, the use of water cannon vehicles for crowd control could pose dangers. Civic Party lawmaker Kwok Ka-ki said that the police were attempting to mislead the public into believing that water cannons were safe weapons, and stressed that water cannons were highly destructive weapons, with water pressure reaching 175 pounds when fired from a distance of less than 10 metres. The then Secretary for Security, John Lee Ka-chiu, who attended the meeting, rebutted the claims, saying that the police had carefully studied overseas experience in handling large public assemblies, including the use of different water pressures and methods to disperse protesters. He said that strict rules and operational guidelines had been drawn up for this purpose, and that operators would also have to receive training and strictly comply with the rules in order to reduce the chance of injuries to affected persons. The motion to summon Lo was ultimately voted down. At the meeting, pro-Beijing lawmaker Junius Ho made several controversial remarks. He said that he believed the police would fill the vehicles with water before using them and would aim accurately when they were used. He said that if the then People Power lawmaker Ray Chan was at the scene, the police should aim more accurately at him; otherwise, "would they take a water gun to wash the street next to them? Of course that would not be right (Note: The original Cantonese remark was "攞支水槍嚟射旁邊洗街，梗係唔啱啦嘛".)". Ho also said that after spraying water, the police could ask whether soap was needed, so that the person could take a shower before going home. He also said that using water cannon vehicles was better than using "cannon vehicles", and asked rhetorically, "Should they use machine guns instead? (Note: The original Cantonese remark was "唔通用機關槍呀？".)" He described Hong Kong's lack of water cannon vehicles as "40 years behind the West".

=== Refusal to publish usage guidelines ===
In May 2018, the first water cannon vehicle arrived in Hong Kong. In June, Legislative Council member Claudia Mo raised a question with the Security Bureau. In its written reply, the Security Bureau said that the remaining two water cannon vehicles were expected to be delivered within that month at the earliest. The reply also stated that the police were drafting guidelines and training plans for the use of water cannon vehicles, and would arrange for the vehicle manufacturer to provide training and demonstrations for officers, while the Police Tactical Unit would be responsible for the related manpower training and deployment arrangements. Although the guidelines were still being drafted, the Security Bureau said that the relevant usage rules and operational guidelines involved operational details and police tactical deployment, and therefore refused to make them public. Mo condemned the decision, saying that the government regarded water cannon vehicles as a secret weapon, placing the police and the public in opposition, and that the lack of transparency in the usage rules made Hong Kong people uneasy. On 29 June, Civil Rights Observer and 21 other groups launched a petition urging the police to publish the principles and guidelines for the use of water cannon vehicles, and to incorporate various human rights principles with reference to international standards, such as prohibiting indiscriminate attacks and prohibiting firing at protesters' heads. Civil Rights Observer member Shum Wai-nam said that there had been many cases overseas in which protesters were injured by water cannon vehicles, and that as Hong Kong was introducing water cannon vehicles for the first time, with a road environment more complex and narrower than that overseas, he was concerned that their use in Hong Kong would be more likely to cause injuries. He urged the police to assess the actual environment and formulate reasonable standards. Another member, Wong Ho-yin, said that, according to documents from the Parliament of the United Kingdom, excessive water pressure from water cannon vehicles could injure protesters' cervical vertebrae or push them into railings or other street objects, and "could be a lethal weapon". He added that past assemblies in Hong Kong had involved objects such as vertical protest banners, and that firing water cannons would increase the danger.

In May 2019, the Legislative Council Panel on Security discussed the police's introduction of water cannon vehicles. When questioning the Security Bureau, Democratic Party lawmaker Roy Kwong criticised the discussion paper for not disclosing the water pressure that could be generated when the vehicles sprayed water, or whether a person hit by the water could be blinded. He said that "some doctors have mentioned that direct spraying at the eyes could cause blindness." The Under Secretary for Security, Sonny Au, said that if water cannon vehicles had to be used, the pressure would be adjusted from low to high, and that the water would be "directed mainly at the lower limbs, not other parts of the body." In response to further questions from Kwong, Au said that the police had tactical considerations when using equipment, and that how and under what circumstances each piece of equipment was used depended on the environment at the scene. He said that the police had no intention of disclosing the water pressure of the vehicles, as if people obtained such information, they might target police tactics or take other measures, weakening the effectiveness of the police's use of the equipment. Au added that the main purpose of the water cannon vehicles was to separate crowds, but did not directly answer whether being directly hit in the eyes by police water cannon vehicles could cause blindness. Another pro-democracy lawmaker, Au Nok-hin, pointed out that other countries had guidelines for water cannon vehicles, including using them only at least 10 metres away from crowds and only when absolutely necessary, but the police had not published their guidelines. Sonny Au responded briefly, saying that the purchase of water cannon vehicles gave the police an additional option in operations and would greatly reduce injuries to police officers, rioters, or two opposing groups. He said that they would only be used in cases of widespread and serious public disorder.

=== Allegations of a staged water cannon demonstration ===
On 12 August 2019, the police gave a demonstration to members of the Legislative Council Panel on Security, firing continuous jets of water at distances of 20, 30 and 40 metres. After being hit by the water jets, the mannequins immediately moved about 8 metres backwards. As the police did not disclose the weight of the mannequins, pro-democracy lawmakers criticised the demonstration as "staged". Claudia Mo questioned whether the mannequins had been filled with water and weighed several hundred pounds, making the demonstration unable to reflect real conditions. Ray Chan said that three lawmakers were unable to lift the mannequin placed 20 metres from the water cannon vehicle, but that he was able to lift the mannequin placed 40 metres away, and criticised the demonstration as "staged". Democratic Party lawmaker Lam Cheuk-ting criticised the police for deliberately playing down the power of the water cannon vehicles. Democratic Alliance for the Betterment and Progress of Hong Kong lawmaker and chair of the Legislative Council Panel on Security Chan Hak-kan said that it was a good thing for the police to have another option for crowd management in the future. A spokesperson for the Citizens' Press Conference said that protesters would find ways to respond to the police's use of water cannon vehicles.

=== Spraying of blue water at a mosque ===
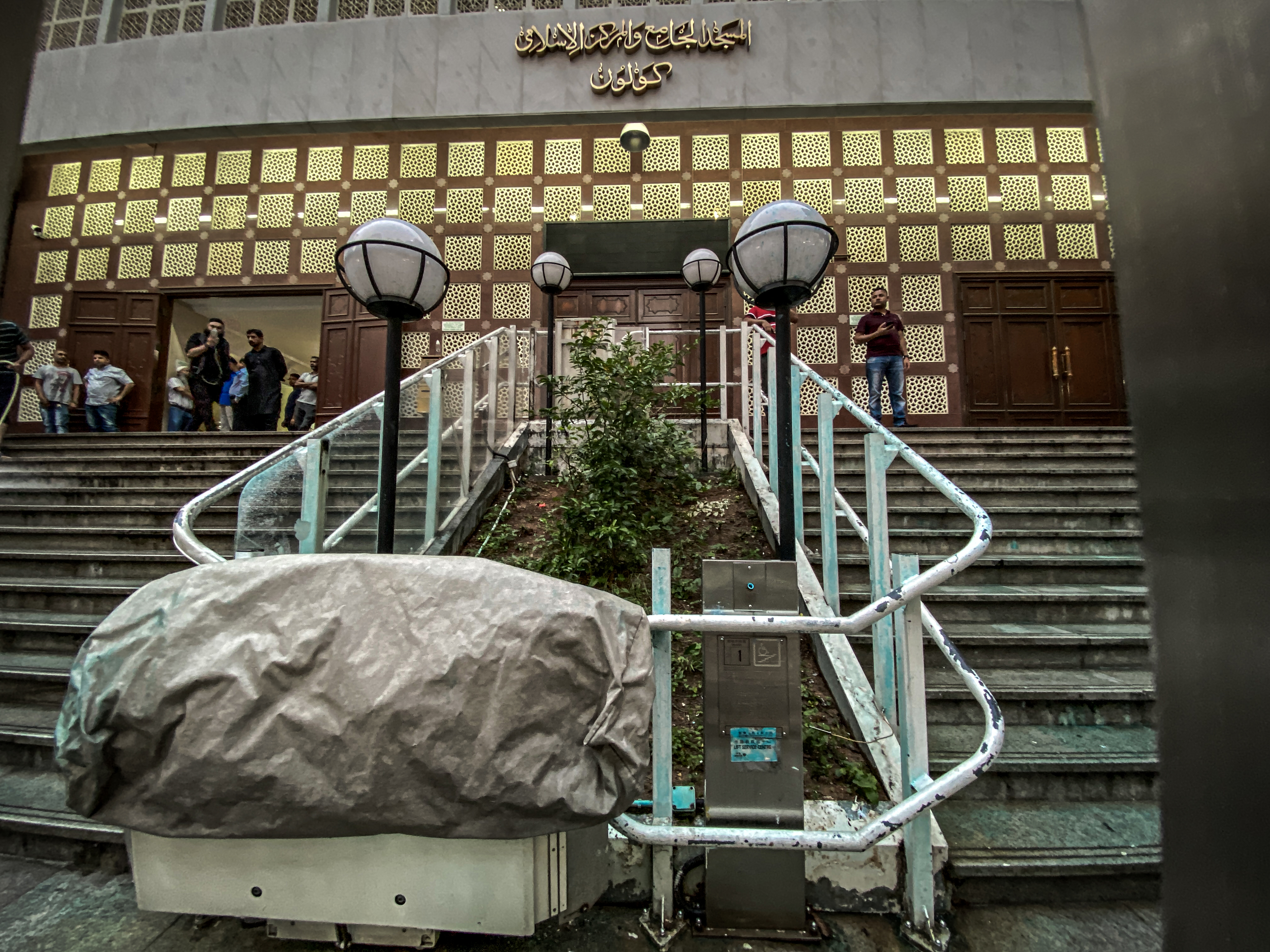
The stairs at the main entrance of the Kowloon Mosque and Islamic Centre were covered with blue water marks after Hong Kong police sprayed blue water at the mosque

On 20 October 2019, while handling protests during the anti-extradition bill movement, the police twice used water cannon vehicles to spray blue-dyed water containing tear agent at the Kowloon Mosque and Islamic Centre, where no protesters were present. In addition to staining the mosque blue, the incident also hit people outside the mosque, including former Indian Association chairman Mohan Chugani, members of Hong Kong Unison, several members of the public and Legislative Council member Jeremy Tam. Some of those hit went to hospital for medical examination. On 21 October, Chief Executive Carrie Lam and Commissioner of Police Stephen Lo Wai-chung arrived at the Kowloon Mosque at about 11 a.m. and stayed for about 25 minutes. Afterwards, the mosque's chief imam, Muhammad Arshad, and others told the media that Lam and the police had made a sincere apology for the incident, explaining that the water cannon vehicle had "accidentally hit" the mosque. However, the Hong Kong Economic Times later found that the large screen inside the water cannon vehicle clearly displayed a rangefinder and a red crosshair, and that police officers could use control levers to shift between different angles and targets. The report challenged the police's claim that the blue tear-agent water jet had been fired at the mosque accidentally.

=== Addition of chemical agents ===
In October 2019, Greenpeace conducted tests on the "coloured water" discharged by police water cannon vehicles, and said on 24 October that preliminary results showed that the "coloured water" contained at least pigment and adhesive, although not all of its components had yet been fully analysed. Greenpeace suggested that the "coloured water" might contain harmful tear-agent solution including pelargonic acid vanillylamide (PAVA), or two other toxic tear-inducing compounds, phenacyl chloride (CN) and 2-chlorobenzalmalononitrile (CS). HK01 asked the police about the matter, but a police spokesperson did not answer the question. In December 2019, when commenting on the collective resignation of the international experts panel from the Independent Police Complaints Council, Human Rights Watch Asia director Brad Adams referred to the police's use of water cannon vehicles to spray harmful chemicals. He said that internationally, water cannon vehicles used only clean water and were used only for dispersal, and that he had never heard of police in other countries using water cannons to spray chemicals that caused burning pain on the skin. He said he was shocked and concerned that the police had mixed skin-harming chemicals into the water discharged by water cannon vehicles. Adams said, "The purpose of water cannons is not to hurt people, but to disperse them, right? What is the purpose of adding chemicals believed to be toxic and harmful to the skin into the water?" He questioned whether the police had deliberately mixed in toxic chemicals, and said that the composition of the blue water had to be tested.

== Other ==
In March 2016, a photograph of a water cannon vehicle in Hong Kong circulated on the social networking site Facebook. The vehicle had a trial licence plate, commonly known in Hong Kong as a "T-plate", mounted on the front. Its body was entirely blue, and it had three water cannons on the roof and at the front. Its appearance was very similar to the design sketch in the Hong Kong police tender documents, leading internet users to believe that the police's water cannon vehicle had already been delivered to Hong Kong. However, sources said that the vehicle was not used by the Hong Kong police, and that its actual buyer was the Public Security Police Force of Macau. It had only briefly stopped in Hong Kong while transiting through Kwai Chung Container Terminal, but still had to apply for a "T-plate". Sources also said that the tender for the Hong Kong police's purchase of water cannon vehicles had closed on 26 February that year, and that the police were still reviewing bids from contractors. The contract would not be awarded until April or May, so no water cannon vehicles would arrive in Hong Kong for testing at that time. The police later also commented on Facebook, saying, "Even online shopping would not be delivered that quickly! The tender process is still ongoing... (Note: The original Cantonese remark was "網購都冇咁快啦！招標過程仲進行緊呀⋯⋯".)" The water cannon vehicle of the Public Security Police Force of Macau is under its Special Operations Group and is usually used to disperse troublemakers. During the impact of Typhoon Mangkhut on Macau, the Macau Public Security Police Force once used the water cannon vehicle to clean the lower deck of the Sai Van Bridge in order to reopen it to traffic as soon as possible.

In May of the same year, claims circulated on Facebook that the police had received a "pump appliance" from the Hong Kong Fire Services Department for use as a water cannon vehicle, drawing concern from internet users. Some described the move as an "insult to fire engines". A police spokesperson said that the Hong Kong Police Force had received a decommissioned fire engine from the Fire Services Department in accordance with the Stores and Procurement Regulations, and that the police were using the vehicle at that stage for research and training purposes. The vehicle was originally a Fire Services Department pump appliance. After being received by the police, it would be used for training by the Police Tactical Unit, the Counter Terrorism Response Unit and others, in order to train officers on how to coordinate with the Fire Services Department during disasters, biochemical incidents, terrorist attacks and other situations. The "pump appliance" was not, as had been speculated, an imitation water cannon vehicle, and its appearance and performance were very different from those of the water cannon vehicles planned for purchase. It would only be used during training to simulate a fire engine spraying water to extinguish fires. Apart from a change in colour, the police-modified "pump appliance" was also fitted with metal grilles over all windows and even over the headlights to prevent the glass from being broken.

== See also ==
- Police vehicles in Hong Kong
- Water cannon
- Riot control
- Tear gas
- Pepper-spray projectile
