= Jeffrey Andrews (social worker) =

Hong Kong social worker (born 1986)

Alterin Jeffrey Andrews
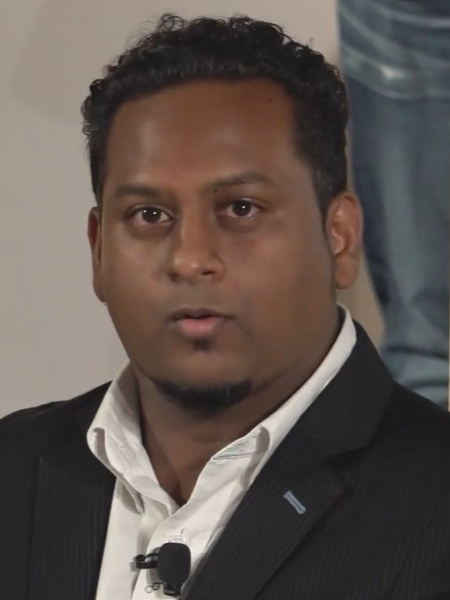
- Andrews in 2020
- Born: 1986 (age 39–40); British Hong Kong
- Education: Caritas Institute of Higher Education
- Occupation: Social worker
- Employer: Christian Action
- Awards: Secretary for Home Affairs' Commendation; Cathay Pacific’s Change Makers; JCI Top Outstanding Young Persons

Jeffrey Andrews
- Traditional Chinese: 安德里
Transcriptions
Yue: Cantonese
- Yale Romanization: Ōn Dāk léih
- Jyutping: On1 Dak1 lei5

Jeffrey Andrews is a Hong Kong social worker, activist, and former Legislative Council candidate in the pan-democratic camp. Andrews was also the first ethnic minority Hongkonger to qualify locally as a social worker. Andrews is the Senior Social Worker for Hong Kong-based NGO Christian Action's Centre for Refugees. Andrews is of Tamil Indian descent.

== Early life and education ==
Andrews was born and raised in British Hong Kong. He attended a designated school, which were established to serve Hong Kong's ethnic minorities, but were later deemed to be discriminatory and dissolved. Students at these schools were often targeted by triad gangs and Andrews was recruited in Form 5. At 19, Andrews was arrested for stealing mobile phones. He cites this as the turning point in his life when social worker Fermi Wong, founder of Hong Kong Unison, assisted him following his arrest and sparked his interest in social work.

In 2011, Andrews enrolled in the Social Work programme at the Caritas Institute of Higher Education, now Saint Francis University, and was the first ethnic minority Hongkonger to qualify locally as a social worker in 2014.

== Advocacy ==
Andrews has campaigned for the rights of ethnic minorities in Hong Kong. During the 2014 Occupy Central movement, Andrews, together with a number of other ethnic minority Hongkongers, marched between several of the occupied sites to raise awareness for the inclusion of ethnic minorities in Hong Kong.

He previously ran courses in cultural sensitivity for the Hong Kong Police Force. Andrews also runs tours of Chungking Mansions, a multi-purpose building which is a centre for many minorities in Hong Kong, but which is considered crime-ridden and dangerous by many in Hong Kong.

== 2019 Protests ==
During the 2019 social unrest, Andrews, together with other ethnic minority Hongkongers, set up outside Chungking Mansions to distribute bottled water to passing protesters.

== LegCo Run ==
In 2020, Andrews ran in the 2020 Hong Kong pro-democracy primaries. He was the first ethnic minority Hongkonger ever to run in a LegCo election. However, the primaries were later deemed to be 'illegal' by the government. Andrews was among 55 democracy candidates arrested on 6 January 2021, but was one of only 8 to be released on bail. Andrews was not charged for Subversion and was cleared of the case in April 2025, after more than 4 years of being under bail subversion under the National Security Law.

== Awards & Recognition ==
Andrews received the Secretary for Home Affairs’ Commendation in the 2015-2016 list for 'Distinguished Service for Community Building'.

In 2019, Andrews was named on the list of 'Cathay Changemakers' for his 'positive contribution to the community and environment'.

In 2024, Andrews was named one of 'Asia's Most Influential' people by Tatler Asia magazine.

== See also ==
- List of Chinese pro-democracy activists
