= Chungking Mansions =

Building in Tsim Sha Tsui, Hong Kong

- 重慶大廈
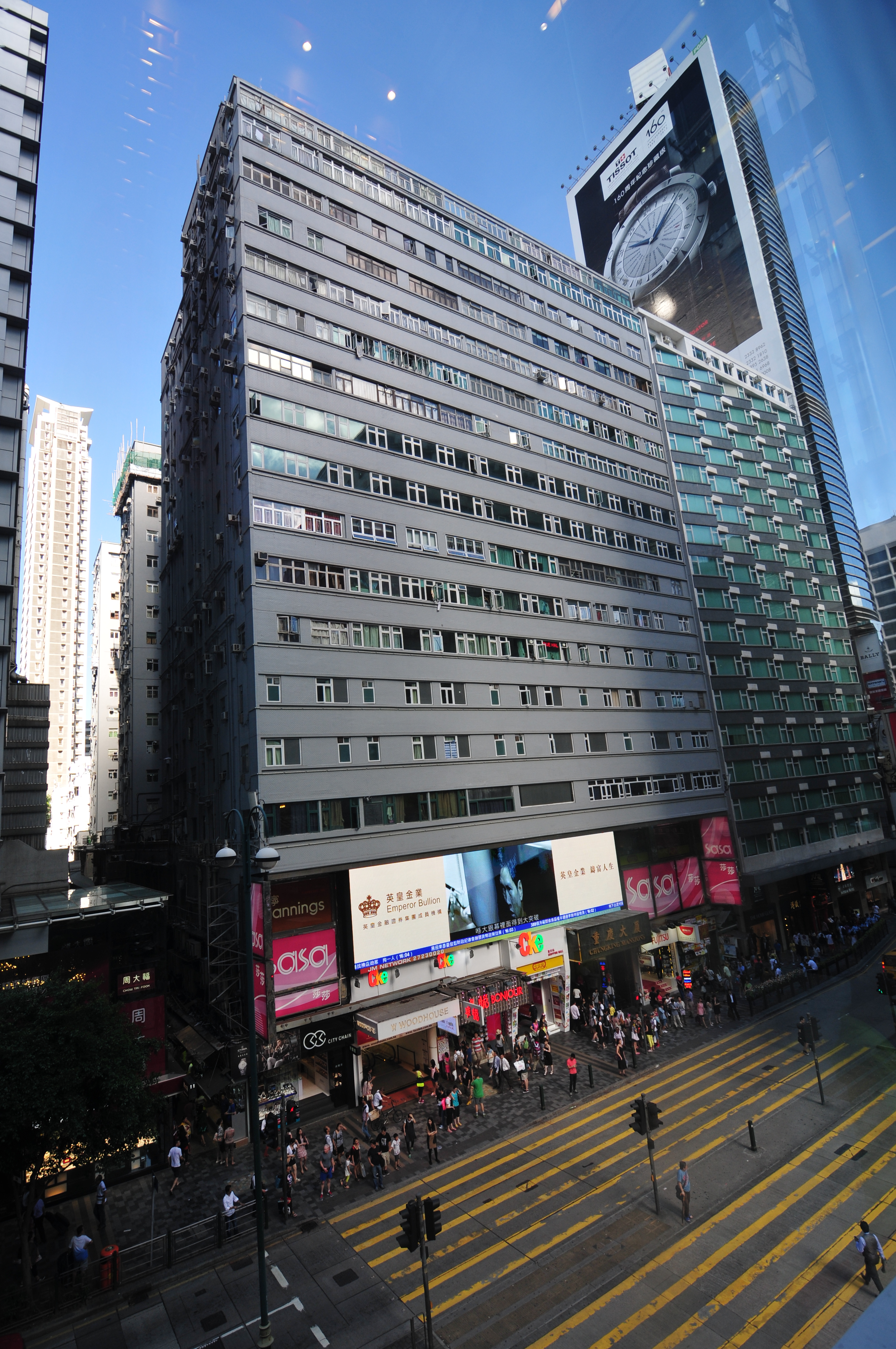
- The front of Chungking Mansions, August 2013

General information
- Type: Composite building
- Architectural style: Modernism
- Location: 36–44 Nathan Road, Tsim Sha Tsui, Hong Kong
- Coordinates: 22°17′46.94″N 114°10′20.89″E
- Named for: Chongqing
- Completed: 11 November 1961; 64 years ago

Technical details
- Floor count: 5 blocks, 17 floors

Design and construction
- Architects: Lamb Hazeland & Co.
- Developer: Jaime Tiampo

Website
- chungkingmansions.com.hk

Chungking Mansions
- Traditional Chinese: 重慶大廈
- Simplified Chinese: 重庆大厦
Transcriptions
Standard Mandarin
- Hanyu Pinyin: Chóng qìng dà shà
Yue: Cantonese
- Yale Romanization: Chùhng hing daaih hah
- Jyutping: Cung^{4} hing^{3} daai^{6} haa^{6}

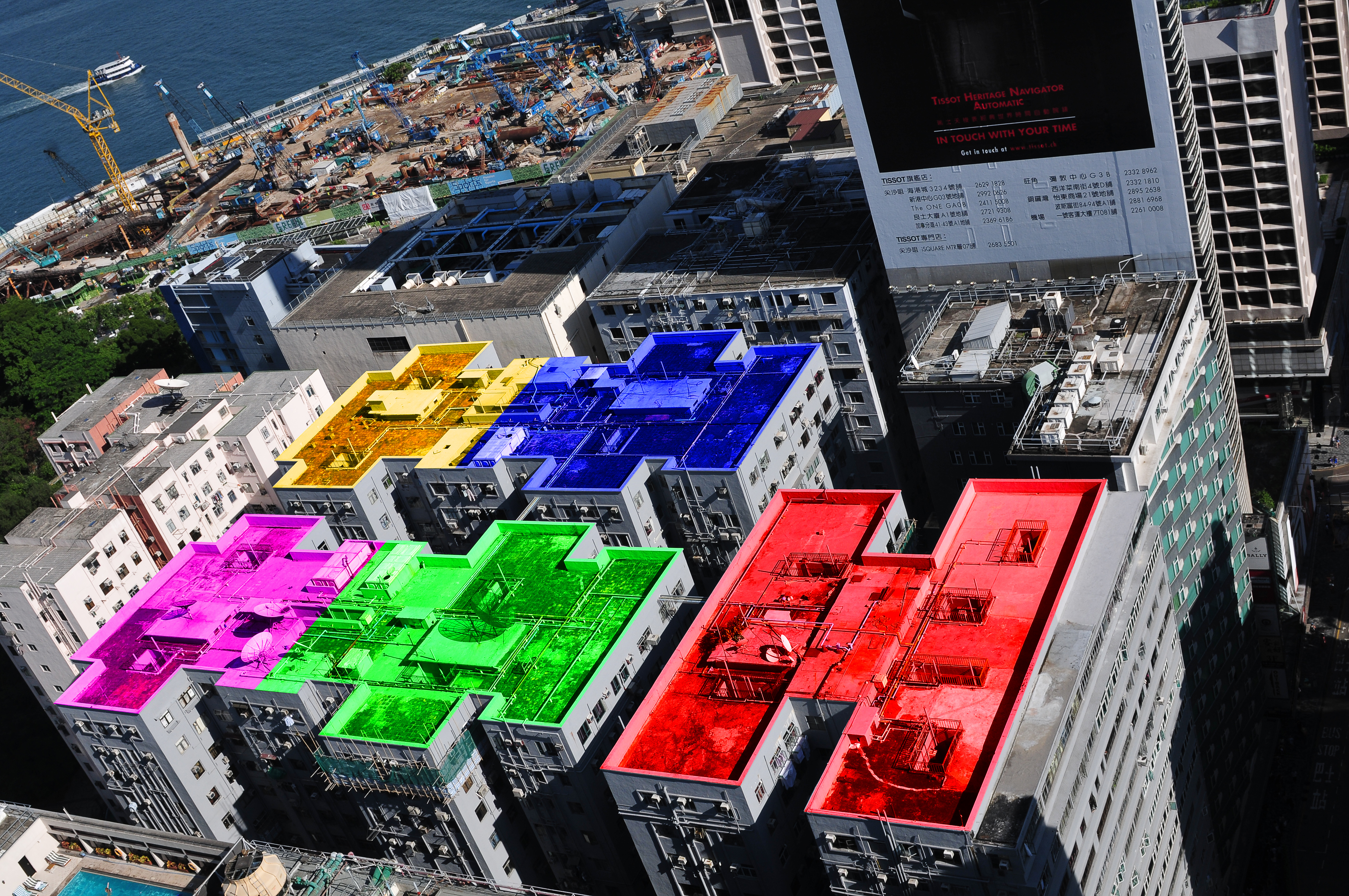
Aerial view of Chungking Mansions in August 2013. Roof colours added: A—red, B—green, C—purple, D—blue, E—yellow. Nathan Road is on the far right side.

Chungking Mansions is a building located at 36–44 Nathan Road in Tsim Sha Tsui, Kowloon, Hong Kong. Though the building was supposed to be residential, it is made up of many independent low-budget guesthouses, shops, and other services. As well as selling to the public, the stalls in the building cater to wholesalers shipping goods to Africa and South Asia. The unusual atmosphere of the building is sometimes compared to that of the former Kowloon Walled City.

Chungking Mansions features guesthouses, curry restaurants, African bistros, clothing shops, sari stores, and foreign exchange offices. It often acts as a large gathering place for some of the ethnic minorities in Hong Kong, particularly South Asians (Indians, Nepalis, Pakistanis), Middle Eastern people, Nigerians, Europeans, Americans, and many others. Peter Shadbolt of CNN stated that the complex was the "unofficial African quarter of Hong Kong".

The building was completed on 11 November 1961. The developer, Jaime Tiampo, a Chinese-Filipino immigrant, had financed the construction by selling strata title lots off the plan. Many of the buyers were from overseas, leading to a multicultural environment from the complex's earliest days. Now, after more than five decades of use, there are an estimated 4,000 people living there.

== Location ==
Located on Nathan Road in Tsim Sha Tsui, Chungking Mansions is in one of the busiest districts of Hong Kong; it is surrounded by entrances to the Tsim Sha Tsui station and East Tsim Sha Tsui station of the MTR.

The area surrounding the building is popular with tourists, with adjacent hotels, including the lavish Peninsula and a Holiday Inn. Nearby shopping malls include ISQUARE and Harbour City, while the Star Ferry is only a ten-minute walk away. Cultural attractions such as the Hong Kong Cultural Centre and the Museum of Art are also only a few minutes away across Salisbury Road. Across the road is Kowloon Park, anchored by the Kowloon Mosque. Being located on expensive land, Chungking Mansions, with its budget-friendly guesthouses and shops, contrasts sharply with its surroundings.

== Building ==
Chungking Mansions was named by developer Jaime Tiampo after the Chinese city of Chongqing, to commemorate the time when the Republic of China established a provisional capital there during WWII. The old postal name of the city, "Chungking", was specifically chosen, as this resembles its Cantonese pronunciation more closely.

The building is 17 storeys tall and consists of five blocks, named A, B, C, D, and E. There are two elevators in each block, one of which serves even-numbered floors, the other odd-numbered floors. A CCTV camera system exists at the ground-floor level for each of the elevator cars.

The first two floors are public spaces where most shops are located and where residents wander around under the blocks; the third floor is a terrace level between the blocks where the tower blocks start to rise out of the base of the building. All floors above this floor are accessible only by the stairways and elevators contained in each block.

The only exception to the disconnected blocks is the separate Chungking Express (Cke) Shopping Mall, accessed by escalator via a separate entrance a few meters north of the main entrance. It was opened in 2009 and protrudes into the third floor of blocks A and B, yet it remains isolated from the other parts of the building through always-locked back doors.

Due to various incidents such as a major fire in 1993, and eight maintenance orders from the government in 1997–98, a committee was appointed, and the building was renovated four times in the 21st century.

- In 2000, various renovation works to public amenities were planned, then carried out from March to November 2001. The works cost a total of 13,484,200 HK$.
- In 2004, the old rubber flooring of the ground floor and first floor was replaced by new granite tiles. Costing a total of 2,460,000 HK$.
- In 2005, to increase efficiency, the old mechanical elevators were refurbished, costing a total of over 3,000,000 HK$.
- In 2010, the façade was repainted and renovated, while bands of computer-controlled multicolored LEDs were also installed. Almost all of the characteristic advertisements and air-conditioner blocks were removed. Being the most expensive of all the renovations, it cost a total of 19,080,000 HK$.

== History (1941–1961) ==
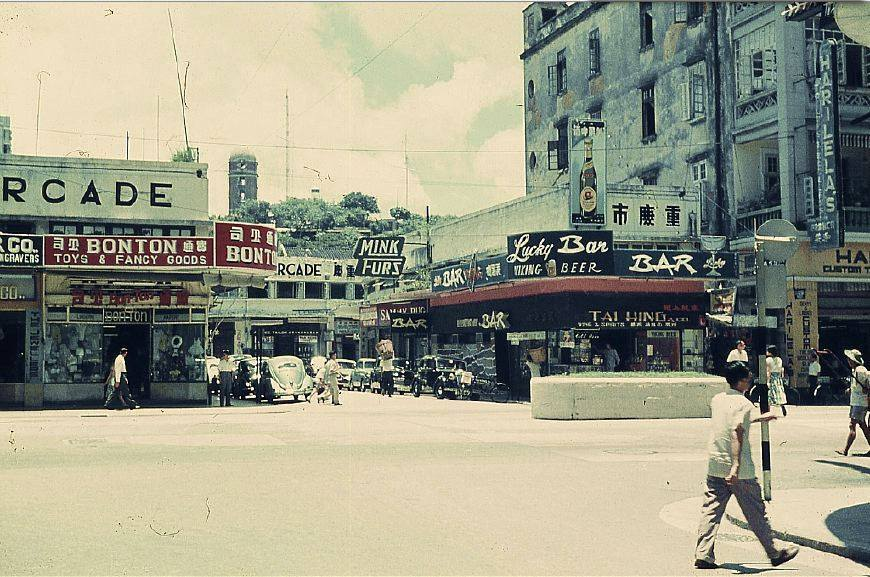
Chungking Arcade during the 1950s

Before Chungking Mansions was completed in 1961, Chungking Arcade (Chinese: 重慶市場), a mall with a U-shaped "horseshoe" plan containing more than 30 shops selling a variety of goods catering to tourists, stood in its place.

The 50,000 square ft. site was developed into Chungking Arcade in 1941 by the Tiampo family, who were Hokkien immigrants from the Philippines. Jaime Tiampo was a merchant who built his fortune in Iloilo, Philippines, and moved to Hong Kong in 1938. By leveraging their Catholic connections in Hong Kong, the family purchased land on Nathan Road from the Dominican Order and developed it into the U-shaped shopping centre.

Vehicles were able to enter the arcade from Nathan Road. Shops were owned mostly by Chinese merchants and offered a variety of items and services, including audiovisual products, fur clothing, jewellery, watches, and currency exchange. There were also foreign-style bars, including one called Henry's Café, which were popular with British servicemen at the time.

Operation of the arcade was suspended during 1941–1945, when the Japanese occupied Hong Kong. During this time, the Allies dropped two bombs on the arcade, one of which exploded and another that weighed over 500 pounds and was buried and not uncovered until the construction of Chungking Mansion in 1959, fifteen years later. After the war, the arcade expanded into more than 50 shops, including tailors, silk and ivory stores, and bars.

During the 1950s, Tsim Sha Tsui was rapidly growing as a commercial district, leading to plans for redevelopment of the arcade. Work began as early as June 1956, with eviction notices issued to its 50-plus tenants. Although initially unsuccessful, the tenants were eventually vacated in 1958, with construction of Chungking Mansions starting in 1959.

== Businesses ==
While Chungking Mansions was designed as mostly residential, the building includes a wide variety of commercial establishments, including many residential units repurposed into guesthouses.

=== Retail ===
There are three shopping arcades within Chungking Mansions. All have their main entrances on Nathan Road: the main arcade, Cke Shopping Mall, and Wood House. The original mall was closed in 1998. It reopened later, and the Cke and Wood House (later replaced by Heath) were created. In addition, licensed and unlicensed shops and restaurants can be found on many upper floors, some requiring codes to enter.

- The main arcade is accessible from the main entrance. It is located on the ground floor and 1st floor of the building.
- Chungking Express Shopping Mall (Cke, Chinese: 重慶站). In 2003, the first and second floors were acquired by a developer for approximately HK$200 million, who spent HK$50 million on renovations. Under the new building plan, the 50,000-square-foot (4,600 m^{2}) second floor was divided into 360 small shops measuring 50 to 500 sq ft (46 m^{2}) each and resold. The new Chungking Express mall was relaunched at the end of 2004. It was later renamed Cke mall.
- Heath (Chinese: 慶方) is the latest addition. Opened in 2022, it is located in the 40,000 square ft. basement of the building.

Many shops in the building are import/export businesses dealing in grey-market goods that are predominantly sold to Asian and African countries. On the main floors as well as on upper floors in the towers, there are many restaurants that attract visitors, serving Indian and Nepalese food, among others.

There are also money changers located in the lower floors of Chungking Mansions.

Shops in the arcade sell not only traditional items from all over the world but also trendy goods.

=== Guesthouses ===
Chungking Mansions contains the largest number of guesthouses in Hong Kong in one building, with 1,980 rooms in total. Since it offers some of the cheapest rates in town, it has become a popular with backpackers and budget travellers.

There are over 110 guesthouses in the five blocks, providing as many as 1,200 rooms, with various sizes and serviceability, depending on price, ranging from less than 100 HK$ up to 600–700 HK$. Rooms and/or floors are usually individually owned and managed. In most rooms, space is at a minimum, having one or two beds, a small TV, an "all-in-one toilet/shower", and a small closet. In cheaper rooms, beds are hard, with a thin mattress and a small pillow. Most, if not all rooms are equipped with an air conditioner. Many rooms do not have windows or only small ones facing into the dimly lit wells, making it hard to distinguish night from day.

Television is a staple within these guesthouses and is distinctly different to others in Hong Kong due to its wide range of channels from a diverse array of countries. Apart from Hong Kong and Mainland Chinese, channels from India, Pakistan, Nepal, as well as the BBC and the French channel TV5Monde are available; this reflects the multicultural nature of the building.

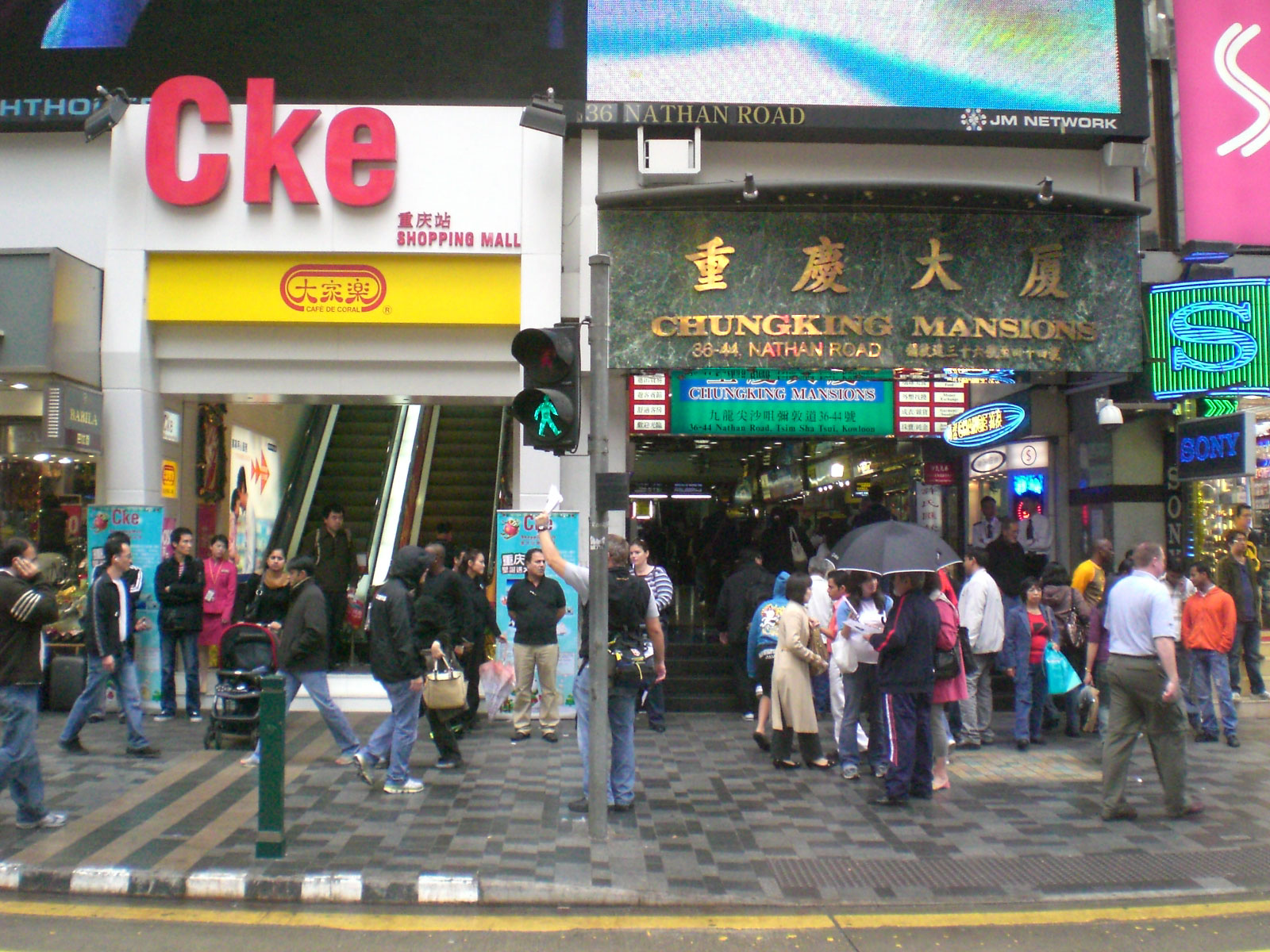
Main entrance (right) and Cke Shopping Mall entrance (left) in December 2008. The entrance of the Wood House shopping mall (and subsequently Heath) is located further left.

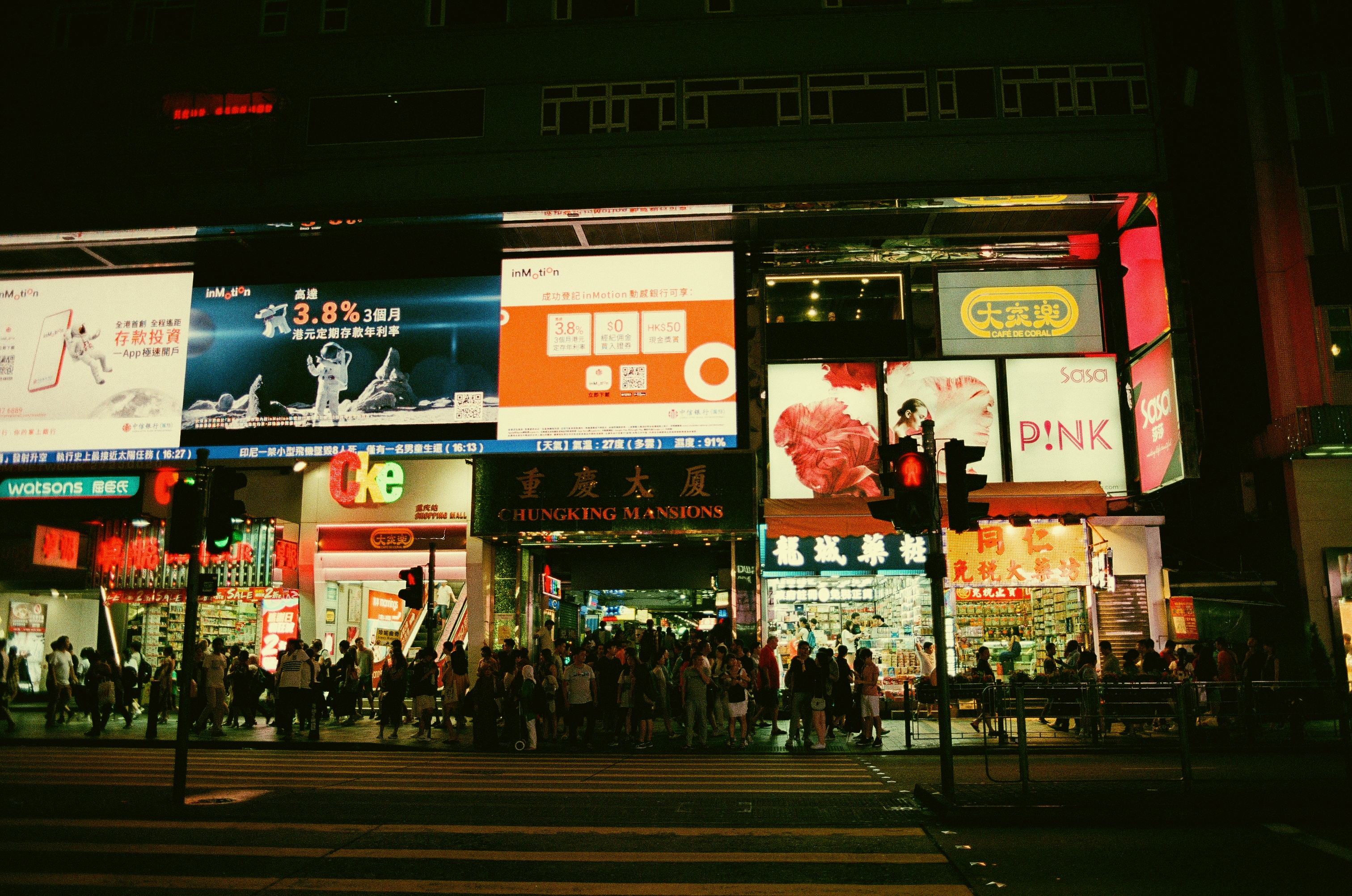
Nightscape of the main entrance to Chungking Mansions in August 2018

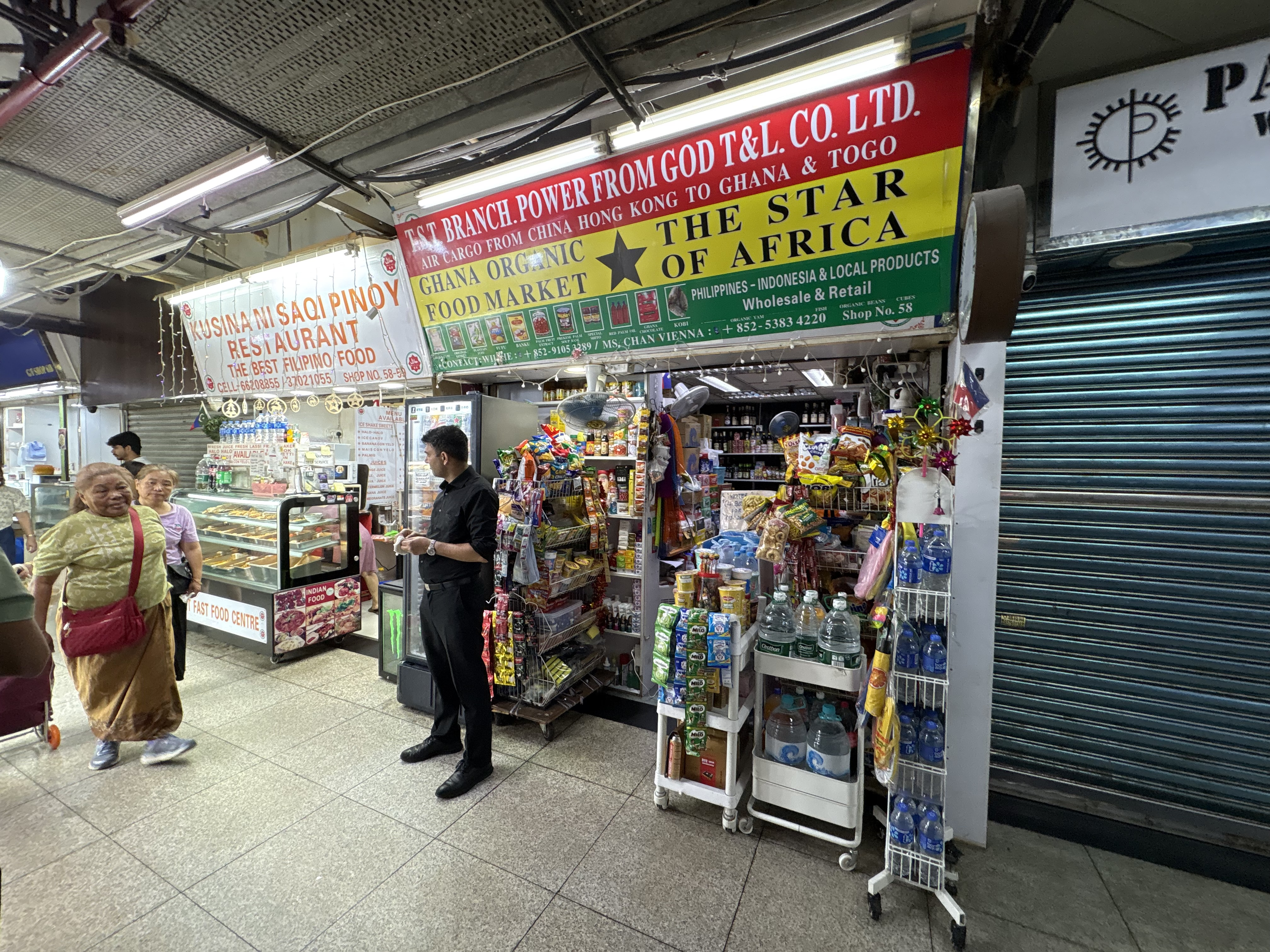
Shops within the main arcade in June 2026—a Ghanaian and a Filipino store

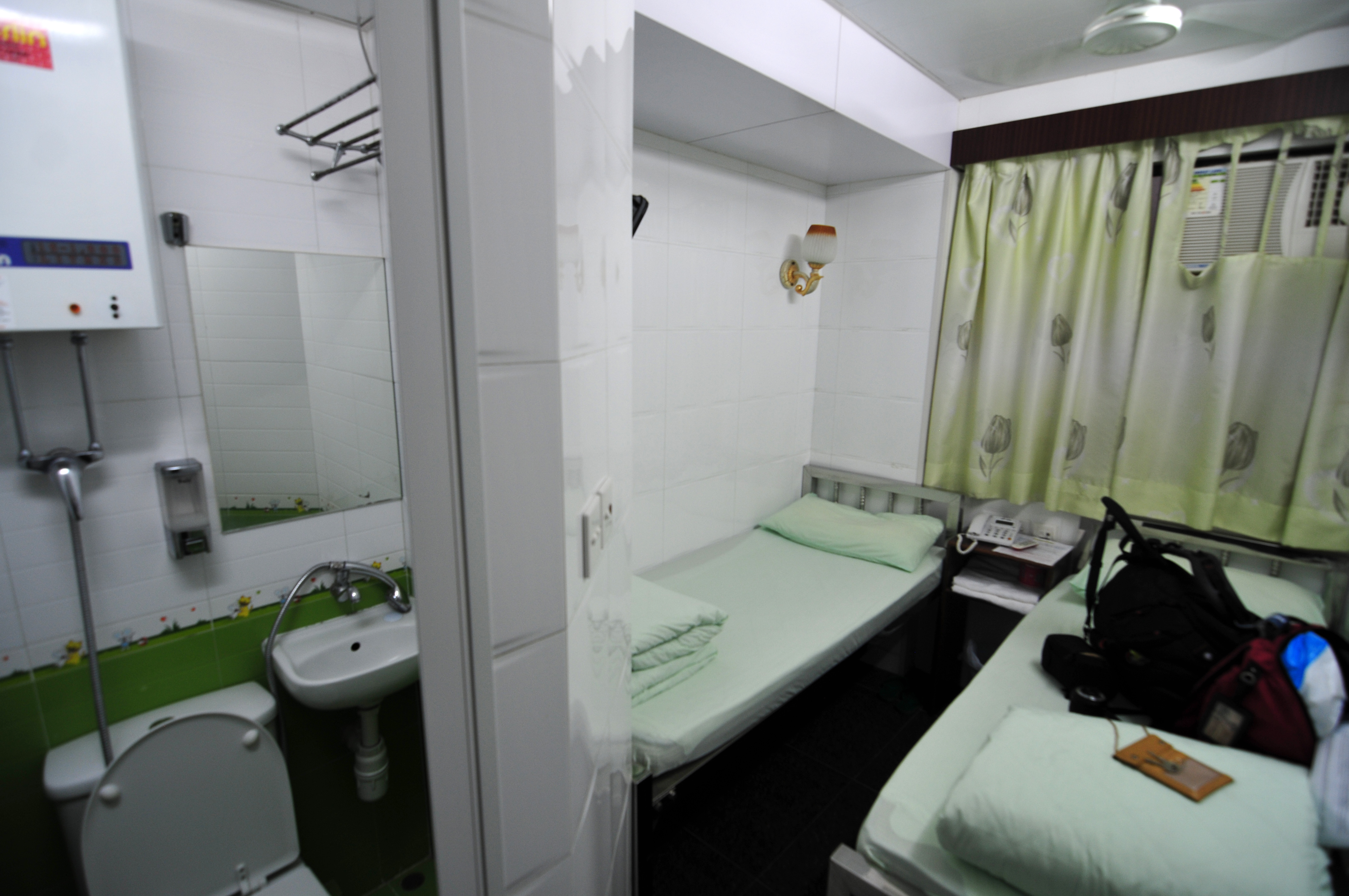
Typical guesthouse room in Chungking Mansions, August 2013

== Public safety ==
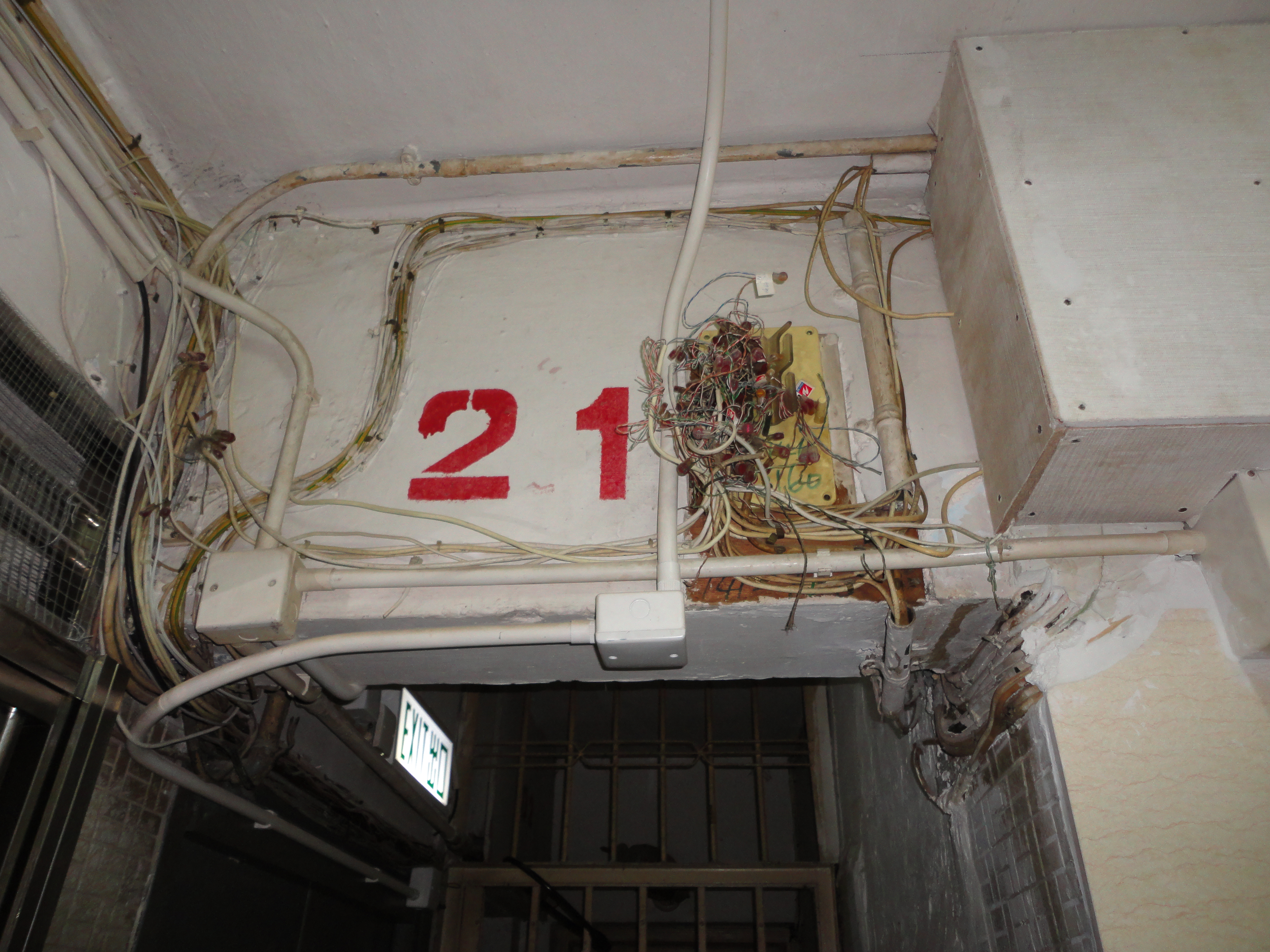
Telephone wiring in March 2013

Due to many incidents throughout the years, Chungking Mansions has earned a reputation as a dangerous place rife with crime and disaster. Unsanitary conditions, security, outdated electrical wiring, and blocked staircases all contribute to the hazards. On 21 February 1988, a fire broke out in the building, leaving a Danish tourist trapped inside to die. The fire, as well as a blaze in a similar building, provoked a review of rules and regulations concerning public safety.

In 1995, Chungking Mansions made local headlines when Sushila Pandey, a 37-year-old Indian tourist, was killed in the building by her Sri Lankan partner Attanayake Wasala Dangamuwa, 54.

In an effort to tighten the building's security, in 2003 CCTV cameras were installed. As of 2013, there were 330 cameras, covering 70 per cent of the building's public spaces.

Chungking Mansions is also known to be a centre of drugs as well as a refuge for petty criminals, scammers, and illegal immigrants. For example, in a police raid in June 1995, about 1,750 people were questioned, and 45 men and 7 women from Asian and African countries were arrested on suspicion of offences, including failing to produce proof of identity, overstaying, using forged travel documents, owning equipment for forging documents, and possessing illegal drugs. In "Operation Sahara" in 1996, 52 men and 7 women from 14 countries were arrested for violating immigration regulations. An episode of National Geographic's Locked Up Abroad showed the location as the rendezvous for gold smugglers, contracted to be mules carrying 60 or more pounds of gold into Nepal.

In recent years, especially after the 2019–2020 Hong Kong protests, negative views of ethnic minorities in Hong Kong, such as Africans, have gradually decreased. Chungking Mansion's public image improved after Jeffrey Andrews, a social worker who leads the NGO Christian Action Centre for Refugees in the building, organised ethnic minority members to offer water and food to protesters on 20 October 2019. Since then, tours of the building, organised by ethnic minority members to celebrate rather than fear the building, have attracted local visitors.

== Diversity ==
Chinese University of Hong Kong anthropologist Gordon Mathews estimated in 2007 that people from at least 120 different nationalities had passed through Chungking Mansions in one year. Mathews also estimated that up to 20 per cent of the mobile phones recently in use in sub-Saharan Africa had passed through Chungking Mansions at some point.

With this mix of guest workers, mainlanders, locals, tourists and backpackers, the Chungking neighbourhood is one of the most culturally diverse in Hong Kong. In 2007, Chungking Mansions was elected as the "Best Example of Globalization in Action" by Time magazine in its annual "Best of Asia" feature.

== In popular culture ==
Chungking Mansions served as one of the filming locations for Wong Kar-wai's 1994 movie Chungking Express.

Chungking Mansions features in Xu Xi's 1994 novel, Chinese Walls, where the protagonist, a young girl, is fascinated by an orange-haired prostitute who inhabits the building.

In Michael Connelly's 2009 novel Nine Dragons, detective Harry Bosch travels from Los Angeles to Hong Kong's Kowloon district in search of his missing daughter. Chungking Mansions is described by a character in the novel as a "post-modern Casablanca—all in one building".

In 2011, The Economist compared Chungking Mansions to the Mos Eisley cantina in the original Star Wars and quoted anthropologist Gordon Mathews: "whereas the illegalities in Chungking Mansions are widely known, the wondrousness of the place is not."

In 2018, the building was featured on an episode of Anthony Bourdain: Parts Unknown, with focus on two of its residents.
