= Kowloon Masjid and Islamic Centre =

Mosque and Islamic centre in Hong Kong

- 九龍清真寺暨伊斯蘭中心 مسجد كاولون والمركز الإسلامي
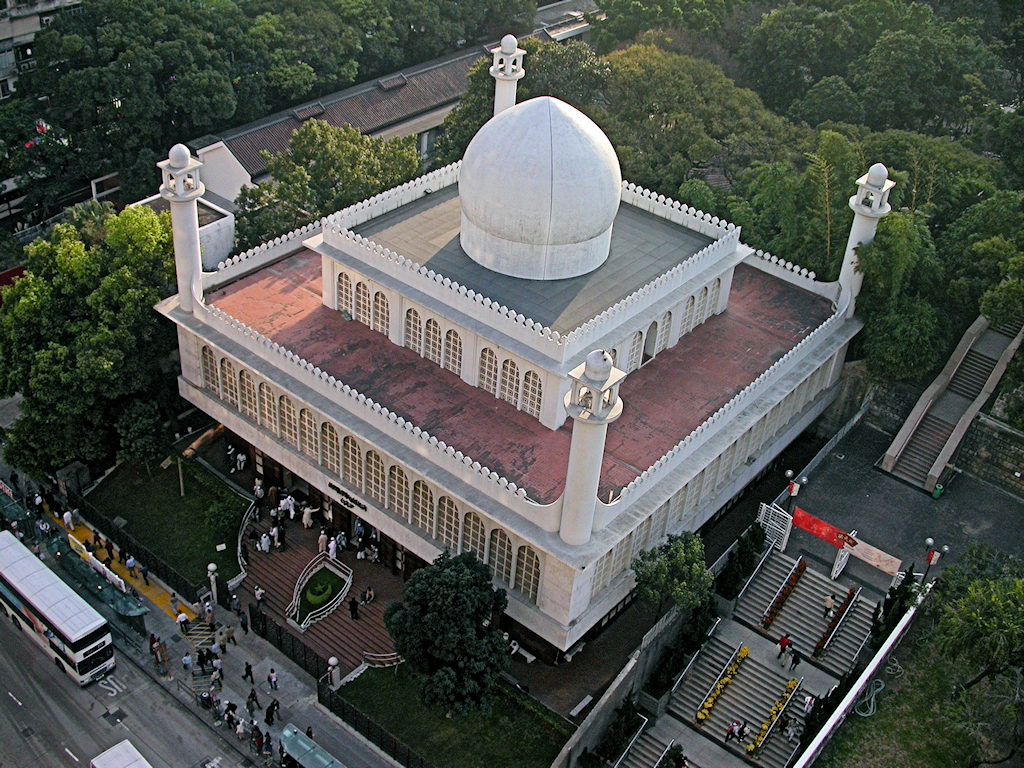
- A view of the Kowloon Mosque from above (from the east)

- Location of the mosque in Hong Kong

Religion
- Affiliation: Sunni Islam
- Ecclesiastical or organisational status: Mosque
- Status: Active

Location
- Location: 105 Nathan Road, Tsim Sha Tsui, Kowloon, Hong Kong
- Interactive map of Kowloon Masjid and Islamic Centre
- Coordinates: 22°17′55″N 114°10′18″E

Architecture
- Architect: I. M. Kadri
- Type: Mosque
- Style: Islamic
- Completed: 1896 (original building); 1984 (current building)
- Construction cost: HK$25 million

Specifications
- Capacity: 3,500 worshipers
- Dome: 1
- Dome height (outer): 9 m (30 ft)
- Dome dia. (outer): 5 m (16 ft)
- Minaret: 4
- Minaret height: 11 m (36 ft)

Website
- islamictrusthk.org/mosques/kowloon-masjid/

Kowloon Masjid and Islamic Centre
- Traditional Chinese: 九龍清真寺暨伊斯蘭中心
- Simplified Chinese: 九龙清真寺暨伊斯兰中心
Transcriptions
Standard Mandarin
- Hanyu Pinyin: Jiǔlóng Qīngzhēnsì jì Yīsīlán Zhōngxīn
Yue: Cantonese
- Yale Romanization: Gáu lùhng chēng jān jih kei yī sī làahn jūng sām
- Jyutping: Gau2 lung4 ceng1 zan1 zi6 kei3 ji1 si1 laan4 zung1 sam1

Main Prayer Hall in level 3

The Kowloon Masjid and Islamic Centre (Chinese: 九龍清真寺暨伊斯蘭中心; Arabic: مسجد كاولون والمركز الإسلامي), also known as the Kowloon Mosque, is a mosque located in Kowloon, Hong Kong, China. Located in the Tsim Sha Tsui area at the intersection of Nathan Road and Haiphong Road, beside Kowloon Park, the mosque is the largest in Hong Kong and holds five prayers daily and is capable of accommodating up to 3,500 people.

== History ==
The Kowloon Mosque and Islamic Centre was first established in 1896 by the Hong Kong Regiment. It was originally intended to serve the Indian Muslim troops of the British Army stationed at the nearby Whitfield Barracks, now the site of the adjacent Kowloon Park.

In the late 1970s, the building suffered structural issues due to the underground construction carried out for the Mass Transit Railway. With compensation provided by MTR Corporation and donations from the local Muslim community, a new mosque was built and opened on 11 May 1984 on the present site at 105 Nathan Road to replace the previous site.

The mosque primarily serves Muslims from South Asia and Indonesia. Many of them also live in Tsim Sha Tsui, where ethnic minorities have settled. This also explains why it also plays an important role as a cultural site for non-Chinese Muslims in Hong Kong.

Vendors selling South Asian items at Chungking Mansions are close to the Kowloon Mosque (opposite the mosque, across the road).

== Architecture ==
Designed by architect I.M. Kadri to represent the identity of the Muslim community in Hong Kong, the mosque is decorated and elaborated, the traditional Muslim architecture of the mosque contrasts with the modern architecture of the nearby buildings. The most prominent features of the building are the four 11-metre-high (36 ft) minarets which mark the corners of the upper terrace and the extensive use of white marble on both the paving and the facade.

In addition to three prayer halls and a community hall, there is a medical clinic and a library. The main prayer hall on the first floor can accommodate 1,000 people. A smaller, women's prayer hall is on the upper floor and is surrounded by a terrace. This upper hall is surmounted by a dome the is 5 metres (16 ft) in diameter and 9 metres (30 ft) high.

== Personnel ==
The chief imam of Hong Kong Mufti Muhammad Arshad (M.A. in Islamic studies) has served as the imam and khateeb of this mosque since 2001 and is the Chief Imam of Hong Kong for the Muslims of Hong Kong. He also teaches the mosque's Arabic language course, and delivers the Friday sermons in Urdu, English and Arabic. He is also responsible for the issuance of fatwa and Quranic maktabs. In addition, he is an instructor at the Hong Kong Baptist University. He was ranked one of the 500 world's most influential Muslim leaders in 2009.

Maulana Qari Muhammad Tayaib Qasmi is an Islamic scholar who has lived in Hong Kong since 1989. He served as chief imam and khateeb of the Kowloon Mosque until 2001. He has invited many prominent Islamic scholars to Hong Kong from different parts of the world, such as Makki Sahib, Abdul Majeed Nadeem Shah sahib, Imam-e-Ka'bah, imam Masjid e Nabwi, Maulana Tariq Jameel, Dr. Tahir ul Qadri and Dr. Murtaza Sahib. Dr. Zakir Naik (trustee) is currently running seven large Islamic centres throughout Hong Kong, giving free Quranic education to almost 1500 students including adult students, boys and girls, who study full-time in local schools in Hong Kong. The mosque is very important to the Islamic community of Hong Kong.

== Transportation ==
The mosque is located near exit A1 of Tsim Sha Tsui station (connected to East Tsim Sha Tsui station by underground walkways). It may be reached via the Tsuen Wan line or the Tuen Ma line (if you walk through the station to East Tsim Sha Tsui station).

There is also a large bus stop situated outside the mosque, with buses to various destinations in Kowloon, New Territories and Hong Kong International Airport. This stop is either announced as Kowloon Mosque or Kowloon Park (which is adjacent to the mosque).

== Water cannon incident ==
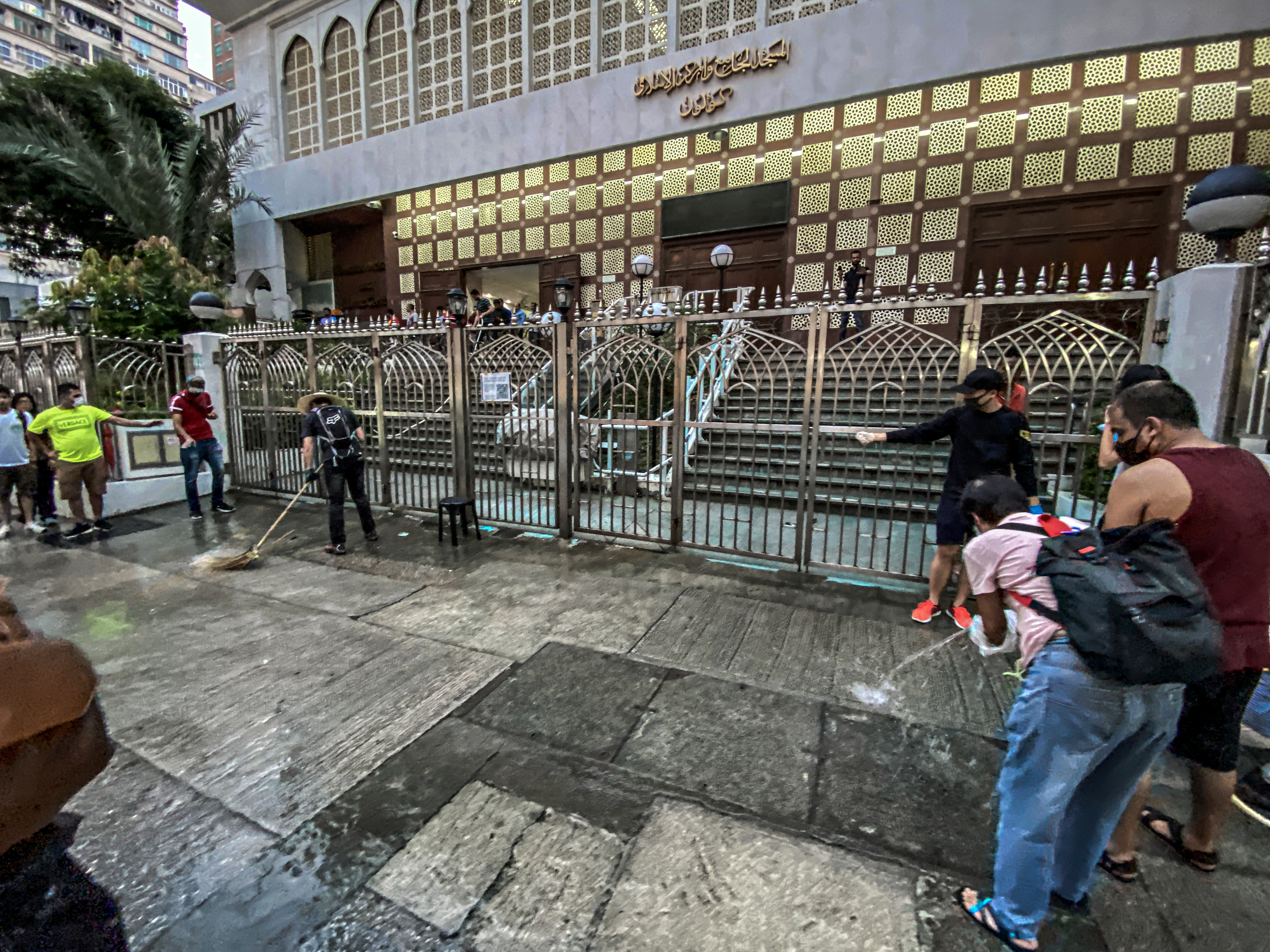
Stinging blue dye sprayed the Islamic Centre Entrance

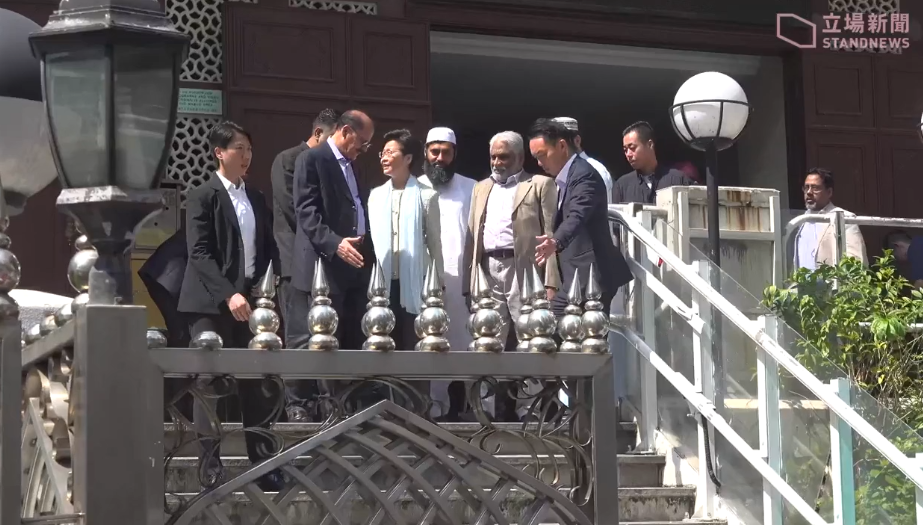
Carrie Lam (fourth from left) seen with mosque representatives, the day after the water canon incident

On 20 October 2019 during the anti-ELAB movement, a Hong Kong Police Force water cannon vehicle filled with stinging blue dye sprayed the Islamic Centre twice. The dousing caused hit more than 10 people who were around the premises causing various injuries including former Indian Association of Hong Kong chairman Mohan Chugani, a member of the Hong Kong Unison and Jeremy Tam, a member of the Legislative Council and several journalists; all them were hospitalized for further treatment. Masked protesters, pedestrians and mosque-goers rushed to the Islamic Centre to clean up the blue dye left by the police soon after. The police contacted the mosque authorities explaining the hit as a "mistake"; then they sent some police personnel to the mosque to clean up for five minutes.

Chief Executive Carrie Lam herself came to meet in person with community members and mosque leaders the next day to apologize on the government's behalf over the incident. At 9:40 p.m the same day, police representatives came to the mosque to explain themselves to the media. A female Senior Superintendent was spotted to not wear a hijab – as required by mosque admission rules – when she entered the Islamic Centre, causing criticism over the faux pas.

=== Reaction ===
Hong Kong Unison and Civil Human Rights Front condemned the police regarding this event. Regina Ip of the New People's Party asserted the need for the police force to apologize. Activist Phillip Khan sees the police action taken as an affront to Islam.

== Gallery ==
The mosque prayer hall in ground level

Quran Audio Library

Function room in mezzanine level

Stairs

Prayer Hall in Level 4

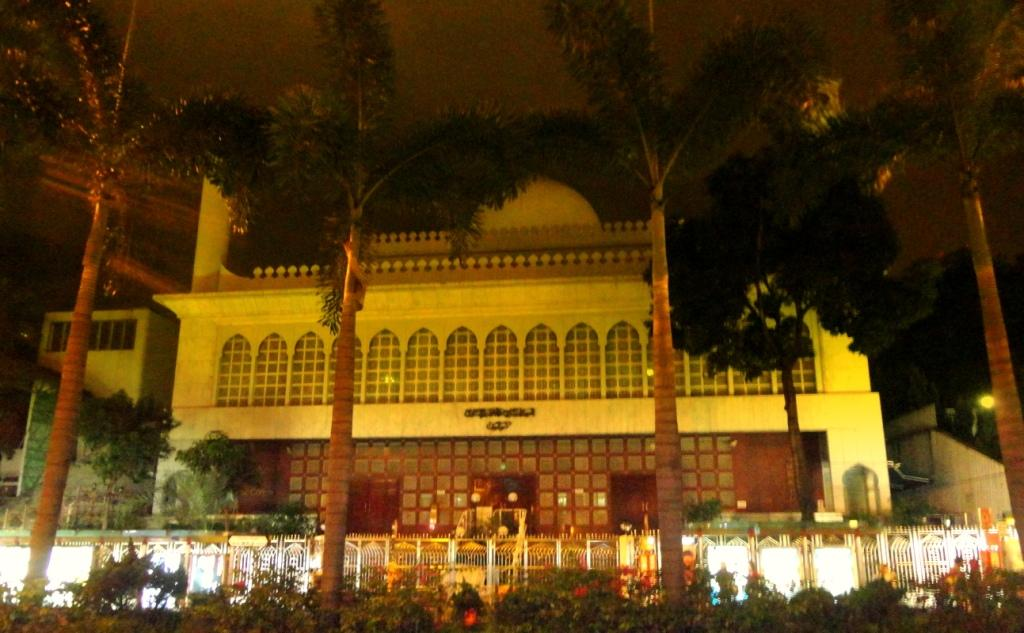
The mosque exterior at night

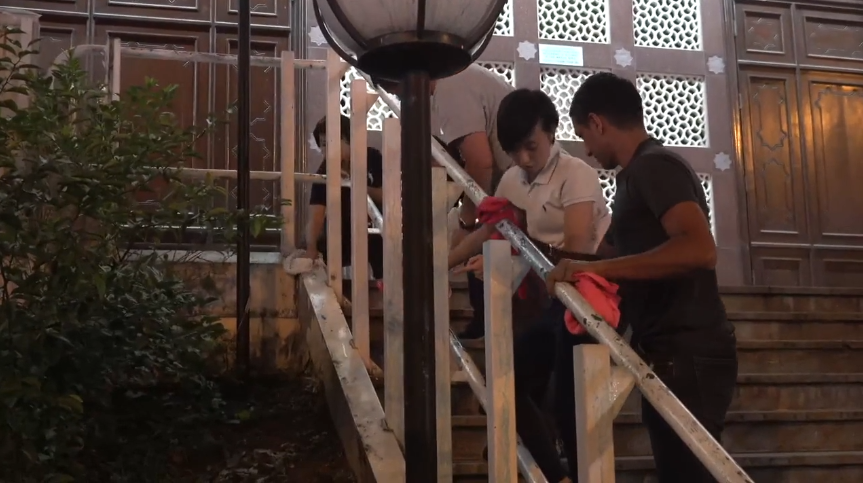
Police staff cleaning the mosque stairs not long after the water canon incident

== See also ==
- Islam in Hong Kong
- List of mosques in Hong Kong
- List of mosques in China
- Incorporated Trustees of the Islamic Community Fund of Hong Kong
