= Hong Kong Unison =

- 香港融樂會
- Formation: 2001
- Founder: Fermi Wong
- Dissolved: 28 February 2025
- Type: Charitable organization
- Registration no.: 91/7763
- Services: Ethnic minorities in Hong Kong
- Chairman: Alice Chong (last)
- Executive Director: John Tse (last)
- Website: https://unison.org.hk/

Hong Kong Unison (Chinese: 香港融樂會) was an organisation in Hong Kong that focused on serving ethnic minorities. Founded in 2001 by social worker Fermi Wong at a time of limited groups on serving ethnic minorities, the group was dedicated in assisting low-income ethnic minorities, including providing Cantonese classes, job finding and family support. Unison was also an advocacy and lobbying group against racial discrimination.

== History ==
Unison was founded by Fermi Wong Wai-fun (王惠芬) in 2001, and registered as charity group in 2005. It focused on serving ethnic minorities, such as ethnic Indian, Nepali, and Pakistani, while lobbying against racial discrimination to speak up for them. With the push from Unison and other organisations, the Legislative Council enacted the Race Discrimination Ordinance in 2008.

Fermi Wong resigned as executive director in 2013 due to health issues. She later joined the Umbrella Movement as a volunteer, and migrated to the United Kingdom a few years later. She was succeeded by Phyllis Cheung Fung-mei (張鳳美) in 2014.

The group was considered to be close to pro-democracy camp. Margaret Ng, a former Legislative Council member, had chaired the executive committee of Unison in 2014. During the anti-extradition bill protests in 2019, Cheung demanded apologies from the police for striking Kowloon mosque with water cannon. Unison issued a statement supporting Ng when she was arrested in April 2020 for illegal assembly. Social worker Jeffrey Andrews, a former executive of Unison, was arrested in 2021 for subversion for running in the legislative primary election.

John Tse Wing-ling, ex-member of Equal Opportunities Commission, became the new executive director in June 2022. A former Legislative Council and District Council members, Tse quit the Democratic Party in 2017.

== Dissolution ==
When the organisation was first established, the voices and difficulties of members of ethnic minority groups were not heard, while now many organisations serve them and the government has allocated resources to them. We believe that the purpose of our establishment, which was to advocate for the rights of ethnic minority groups, has been largely achieved, so we decided to put forward this resolution for members' voluntary liquidation.

— Alice Chong, last chairperson of Unison

A general meeting was held on 28 February 2025, during which a motion to dissolve the group was passed in a 16-to-1 vote after twelve minutes. It came just days after the chairlady Alice Chong Ming-lin (莊明蓮) said such decision was under consideration by the executive committee. Chong said while difficulties remain in advocating for the rights of ethnic minorities, the consideration for dissolution is not due to "financial reasons or political pressure", which had emerged two to three years ago. She added the historical mission has been completed as more non-governmental organisations began serving ethnic minorities, and winding down Unison would not significantly impact the welfare of the ethnic minorities.

John Tse and Javria Khalid, a project officer of the group, were both dismissed on the same day of the general meeting. They slammed the decision of dissolution as "irresponsible" and "unconvincing". Calling his former employer's act as "mutual destruction", Tse said he had demanded "depoliticising" Unison and focus on monitoring policies and services after he started to lead Unison two and a half years ago. Inaugural chairlady Fermi Wong supported the dissolution in order to shut opportunists from exploiting the group she founded for personal or political gain at a time when advocacy works are increasingly difficult.

== Leadership ==
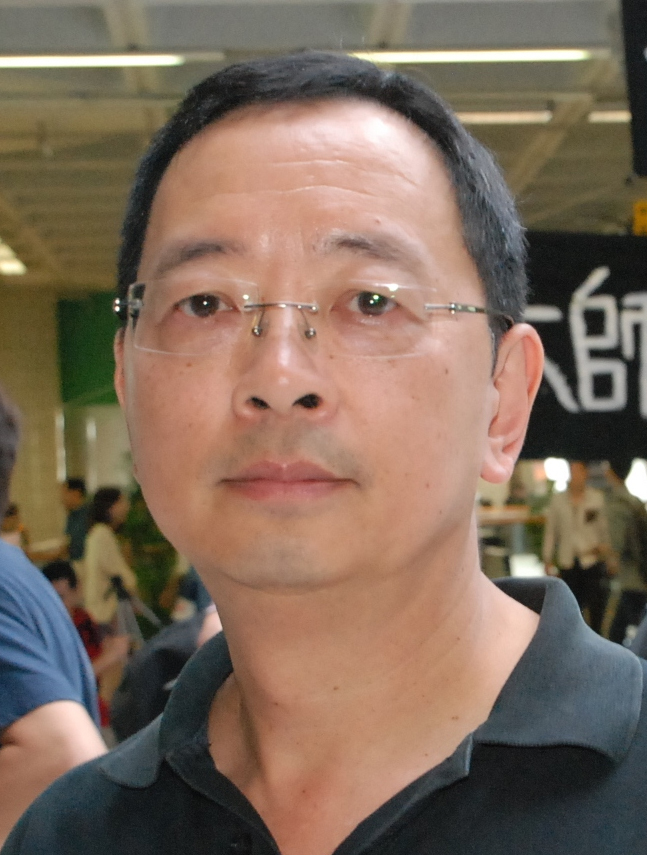
Tse, the last executive director, in 2016

Executive Directors

- Fermi Wong (2001–13), resigned
- Phyllis Cheung (2014–22)
- John Tse (2022–25)
