= Places of worship in Hong Kong =

Hong Kong counts approximately 600 temples, shrines and monasteries. While Buddhism and Christianity are the most widely practiced religions, most religions are represented in the Special Administrative Region.

== Buddhist temples and monasteries ==
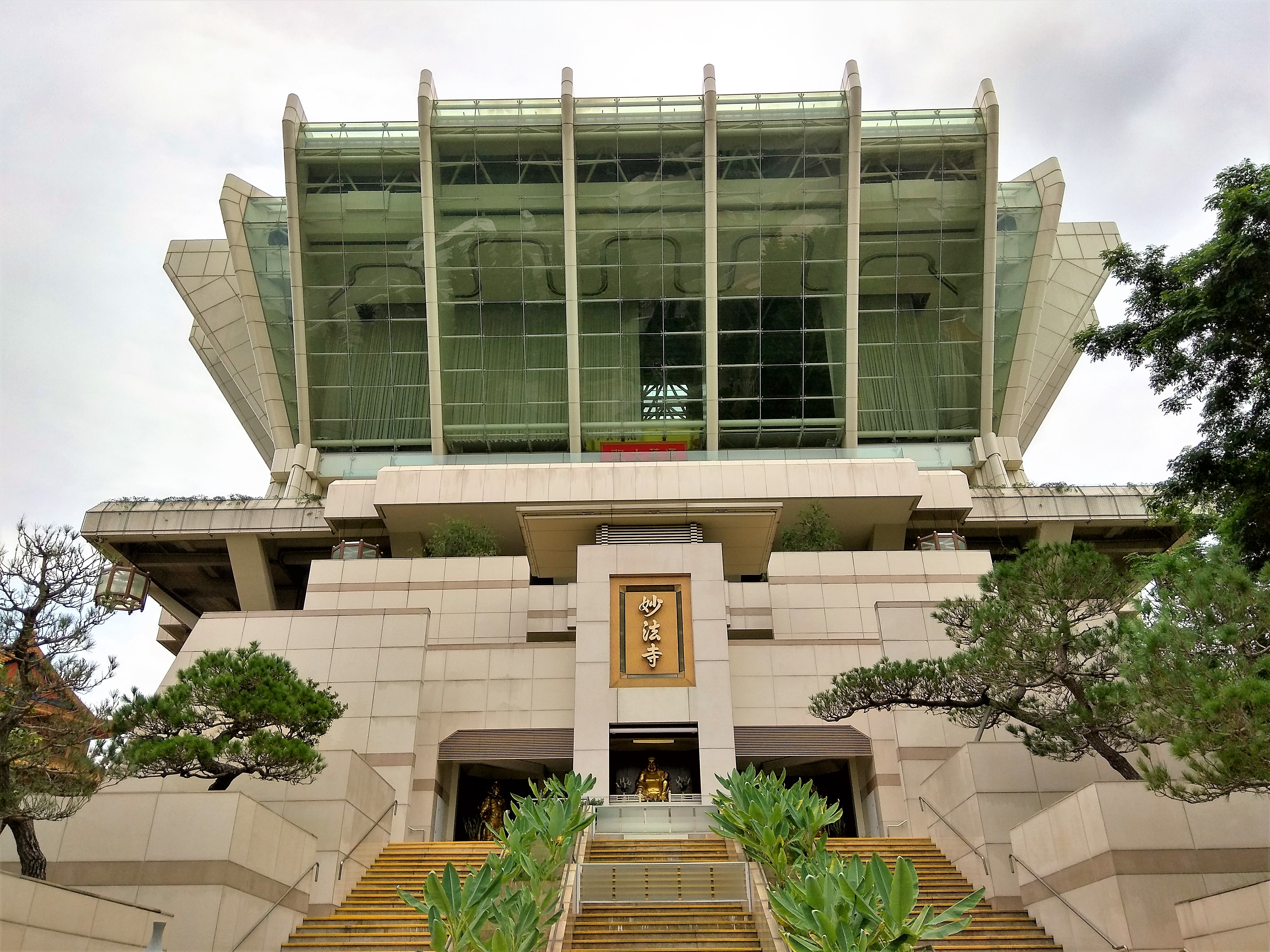
Miu Fat Buddhist Monastery

- Cham Shan Monastery (湛山寺), Clear Water Bay Peninsula
- Chi Lin Nunnery (志蓮淨苑), Diamond Hill, Kowloon
- Ling To Monastery (靈渡寺), Ha Tsuen, Yuen Long District
- Miu Fat Buddhist Monastery (妙法寺), Lam Tei, Tuen Mun District
- Po Lin Monastery (寶蓮禪寺), Lantau Island
- Ten Thousand Buddhas Monastery (萬佛寺), Sha Tin
- Tsing Shan Monastery (青山禪院) (also called Piu To Temple), Tuen Mun
- Tsz Shan Monastery (慈山寺), Tung Tsz, Tai Po District
- Tung Lin Kok Yuen (東蓮覺苑), Happy Valley
- Tung Po Tor Monastery (東普陀講寺), Lo Wai, Tsuen Wan District
- Wat Mekatamwanaram or Wat Tai Wo (太和泰國寺), Tai Po
- Wat Hong Kong Dhammaram, Yuen Long

== Taoist temples and monasteries ==
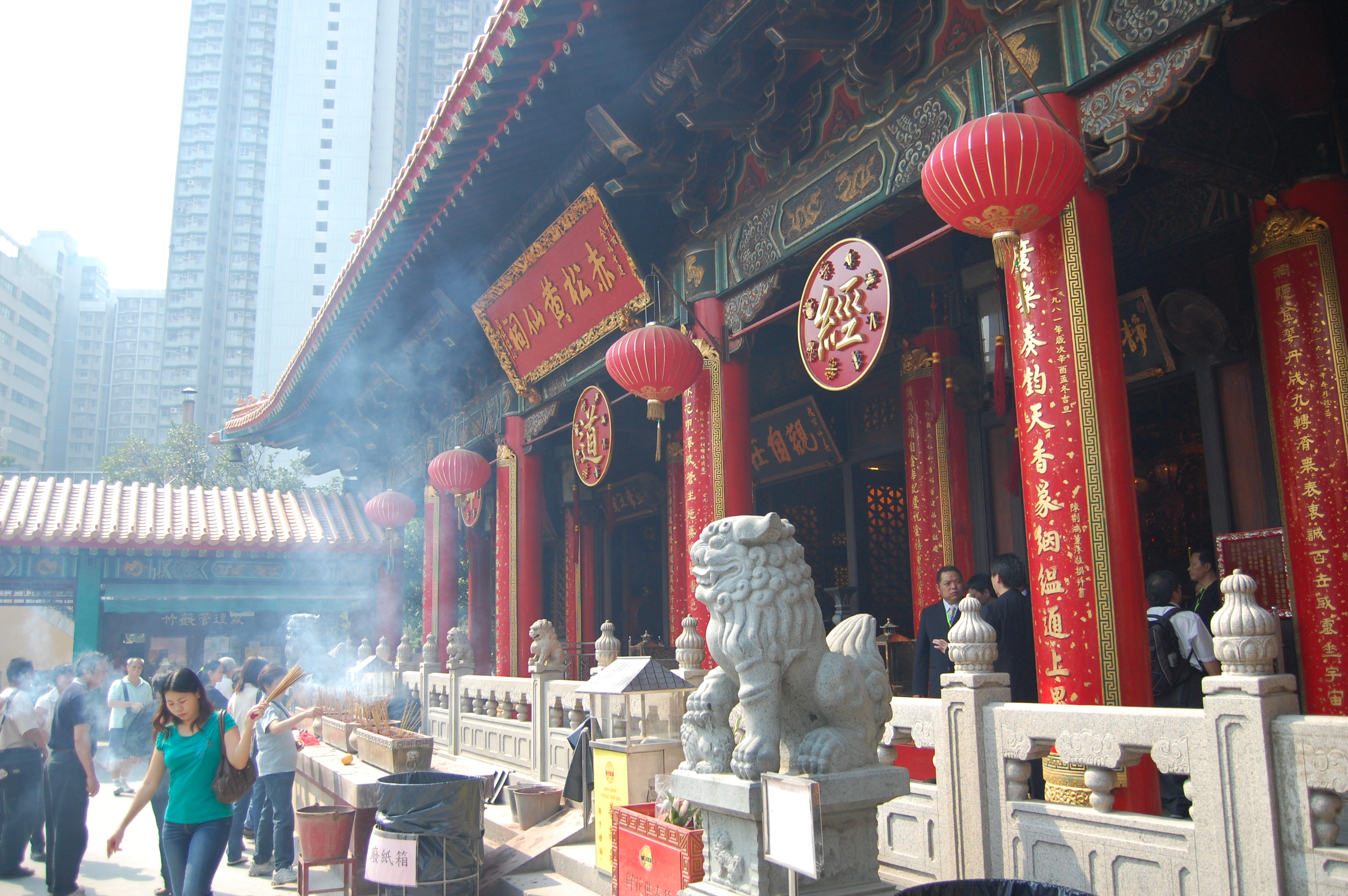
Wong Tai Sin Temple

- Ching Chung Koon (青松觀) (Tuen Mun)
- Chong Har Ching Ser (藏霞精舍) (Fanling)
- Fung Ying Seen Koon (蓬瀛仙館) (Fanling)
- Shang Sin Chun Tong (省善真堂) (Kowloon Tong)
- Sin Hing Tung (善慶洞) (Tuen Mun)
- Tai Sing Fat Tong (大聖寶廟) (Sau Mau Ping)
- Wong Tai Temple (黃帝祠) (Luen Wo Hui)
- Wong Tai Sin Temple (Sik Sik Yuen) (黃大仙祠) (New Kowloon)
- Wun Chuen Sin Koon (雲泉仙館) (Ta Kwu Ling)
- Yuen Yuen Institute (圓玄學院) (Tsuen Wan District)

== Joss houses ==
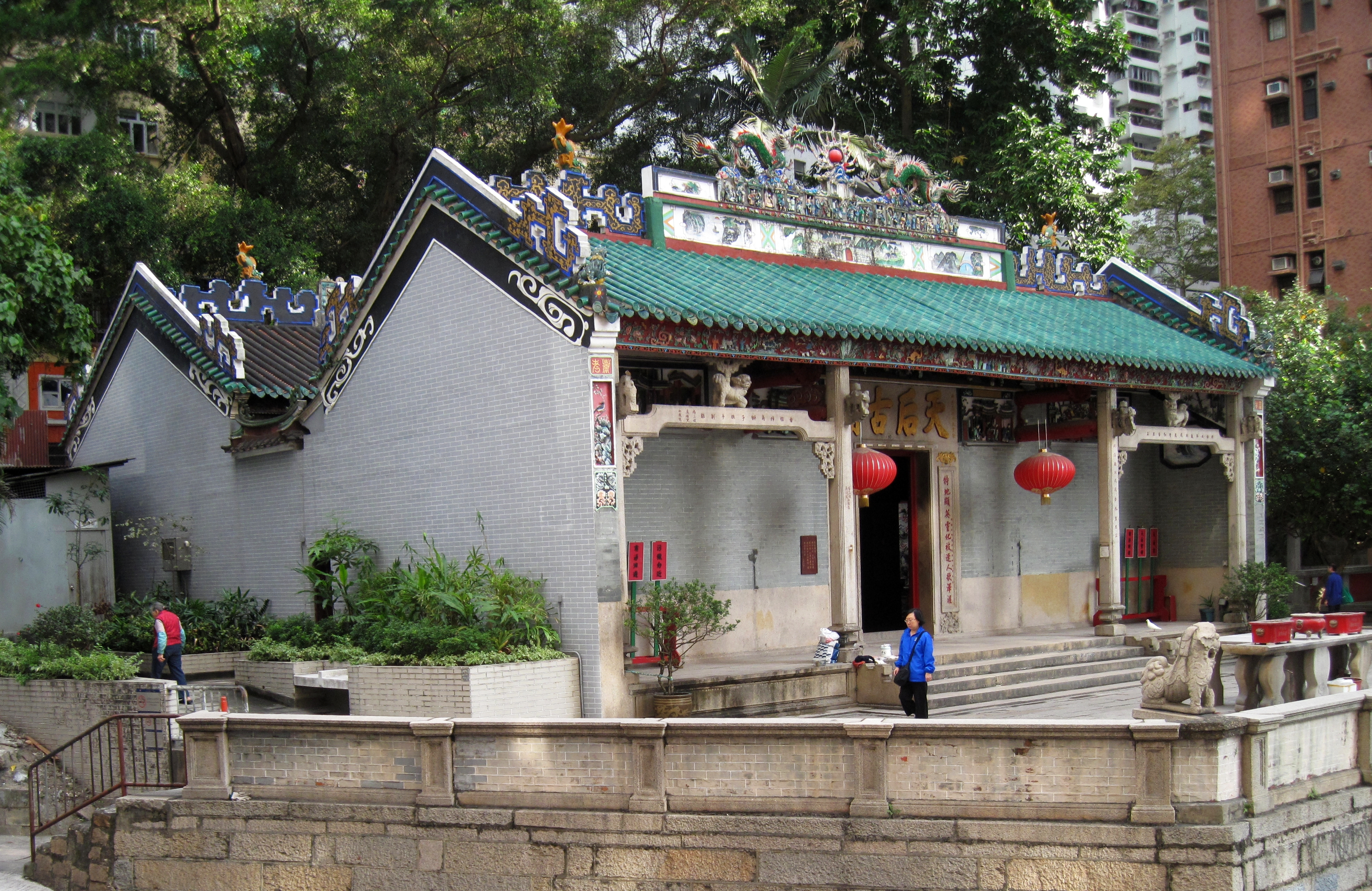
Tin Hau temple, Tin Hau, Causeway Bay

=== Tin Hau temples ===
Over 100 temples are dedicated, at least partially to Tin Hau. They include:

- Tin Hau Temple (銅鑼灣天后廟), located at 10, Tin Hau Temple Road, Causeway Bay, east of Victoria Park, in Eastern District, on Hong Kong Island. It is one of the declared monuments of Hong Kong. The temple has given its name to the MTR station serving it (Island line).
- Tin Hau Temple in Yau Ma Tei (油麻地天后廟) is also famous in Hong Kong. The public square, Yung Shue Tau before it is surrounded by a night market of Temple Street (a street named after it).
- Tin Hau Temple (佛堂門天后古廟) at Tai Miu Wan (大廟灣; Joss House Bay) is considered the most sacred. It is one of the Grade I historic building.
- Hau Kok Tin Hau Temple (后角天后廟), stands by the Tuen Mun River channel and located next to Tin Hau Road in Tuen Mun.

=== Others ===
- Che Kung Temples (車公廟), dedicated to Che Kung(車公) (located in Sha Tin & Sai Kung)
- Chun Kwan Temple (真君廟) on Tsing Yi Island, dedicated to Chun Kwan
- Emperor Guan Temples (dedicated to Kwan Tai, also referred to as Lord Guan & Kuan Kong)
  - Hip Tin Temples (協天宮), list of thirteen temples in Hong Kong
  - Kwan Tai Temples (關帝廟), list of fifteen temples in Hong Kong
  - Man Mo Temples (文武廟), dedicated to Kwan Tai and Man Cheong (located in Sheung Wan, Tai Po & Lantau Island)
  - Kwan Kung Pavilion (關公忠義亭) in Cheung Chau Island
- Fan Sin Temple (樊仙宮) in Sheung Wun Yiu, Tai Po
- Hau Wong Temples and Yeung Hau Temples (楊侯古廟), dedicated to Yeung Hau Tai Wong (楊侯大王) (list of thirteen temples in Hong Kong)
- Hung Shing Temples and Tai Wong Temples, dedicated to Hung Shing Tai Wong (洪聖大王) (list of forty-two temples in Hong Kong)
  - Hung Shing Temple, Wan Chai, listed as a Grade I historic building and is part of the Wan Chai Heritage Trail
  - Hung Shing Temple, Tai Kok Tsui, located at No. 58 Fuk Tsun Street and is the only Hung Shing temple in urban Kowloon
- I Shing Temple (二聖宮) in Tung Tau Wai of Wang Chau, dedicated to Hung Shing and Che Kung
- Kwun Yam Temples (dedicated to Kwun Yam (觀音), also known as Guan Yin Bodhisattva)
  - Kwun Yam Shrine in Repulse Bay
  - Lin Fa Temple (大坑蓮花宮) in Tai Hang
- Lam Tsuen wishing trees (林村許願樹) (located near the Tin Hau Temple in Fong Ma Po Village, Lam Tsuen)
- Lo Pan Temple (魯班先師廟) in Kennedy Town, dedicated to Lo Pan
- Lung Mo Temples, dedicated to Lung Mo (龍母) (list of four temples in Wan Chai, To Kwa Wan, Lo Wai and Peng Chau)
- Pak Tai Temples, dedicated to Pak Tai (北帝) (list of fifteen temples in Hong Kong)
  - Yuk Hui Temple (玉虛宮) in Cheung Chau Island
  - Pak Tai Temple (灣仔北帝廟) in Wan Chai, which is a Declared Monument
- Sam Tai Tsz Temple and Pak Tai Temple (深水埗三太子及北帝廟) in Sham Shui Po, dedicated to Sam Tai Tsz and Pak Tai
- Sam Shan Kwok Wong Temple (三山國王廟), located in Ngau Chi Wan, next to Ping Shek Estate, along Kwun Tong Road
- Shing Wong Temples (城隍廟), dedicated to City God (城隍) (list of four temples in Shau Kei Wan, Yau Ma Tei, Sau Mau Ping & Tuen Mun District)
- Tai Wong Temple (大王古廟) in Yuen Long Kau Hui, dedicated to Hung Shing and Yeung Hau
- Tam Kung Temples and Tam Tai Sin Temples, dedicated to Tam Kung (譚公) (list of four temples in Shau Kei Wan, Southern District, Happy Valley and Ping Chau)
- Tu Di Gong, or Earth God Temples & Shrines (like Fok Tak Temple (福德古廟) in Tsim Sha Tsui)
- Yuk Wong Bo Din (玉皇寶殿) in Shau Kei Wan, dedicated to Yuk Wong (Jade Emperor)

== Christian churches ==
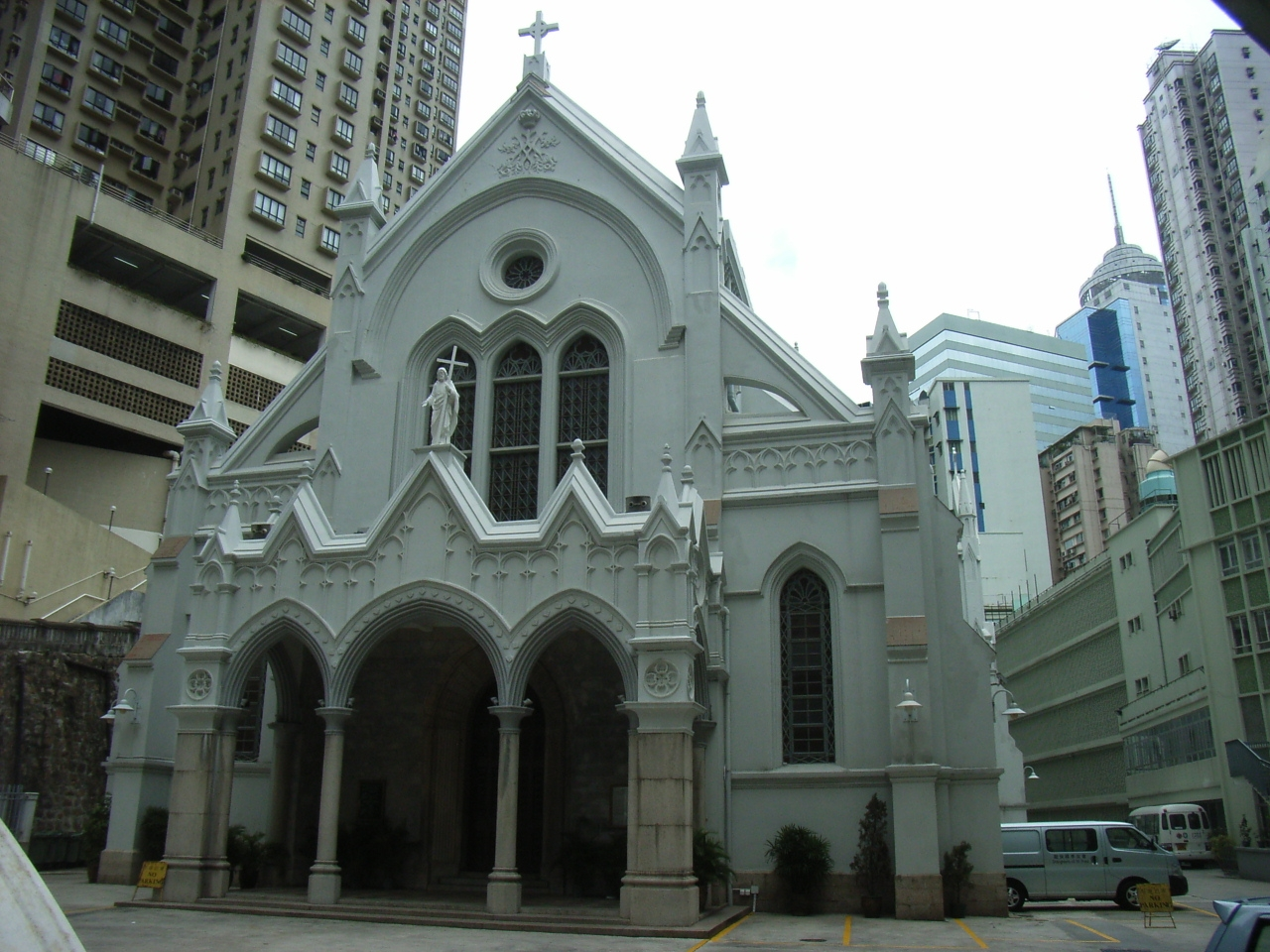
Cathedral of the Immaculate Conception

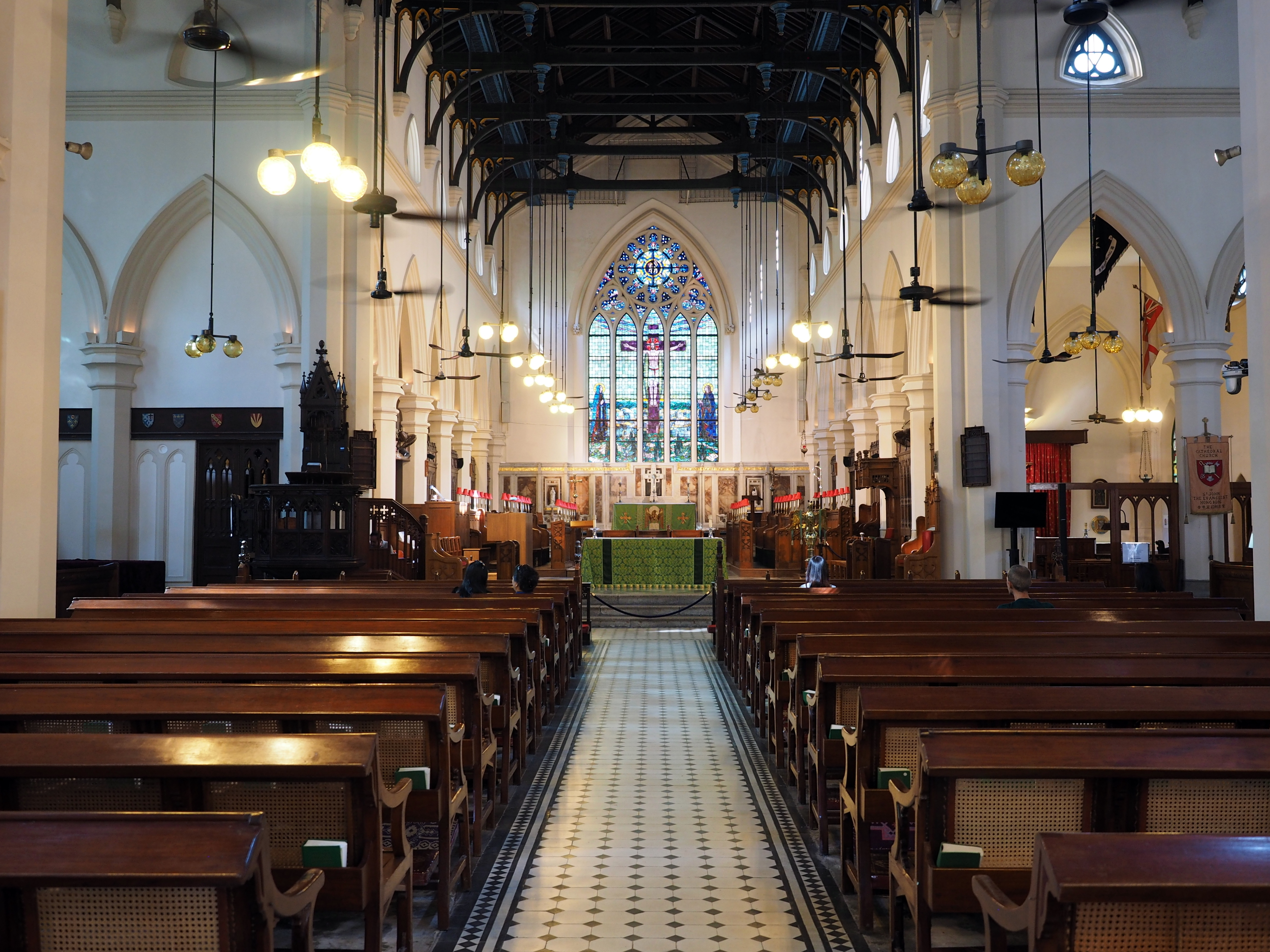
Interior of St John's Cathedral

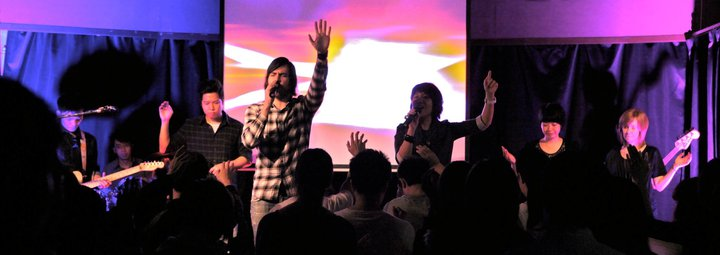
Lifehouse International Church Hong Kong, a Hillsong family church

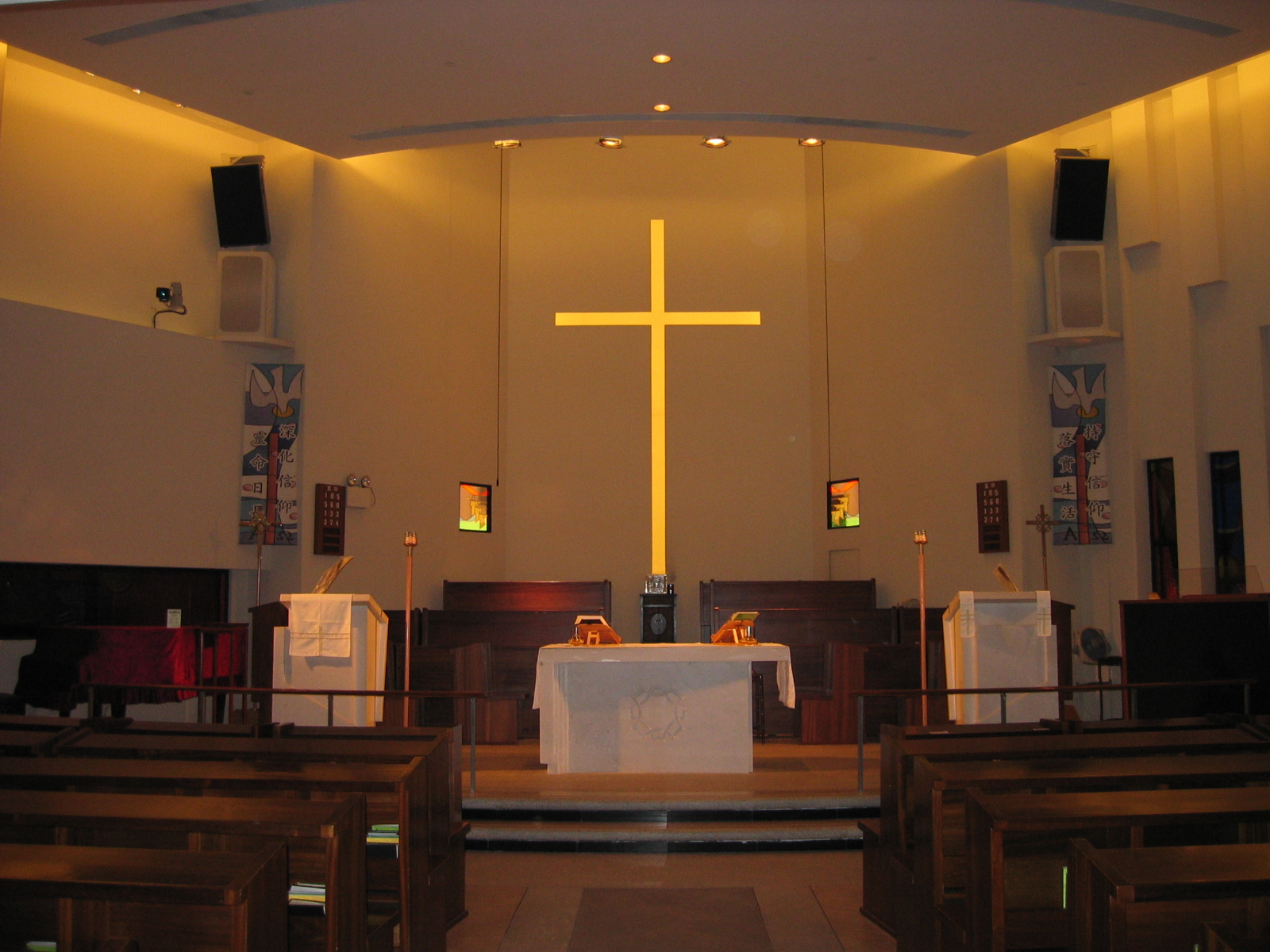
SKH Crown of Thorns' Church

Note: Only churches with wiki articles are listed on this list

=== Hong Kong Island ===
==== Central and Western District ====
- Cathedral of the Immaculate Conception (Roman Catholic)
- Hop Yat Church (Hong Kong)
- Peak Church (a former Protestant chapel)
- St John's Cathedral (Hong Kong)
- Union Church
- The Vine Christian Fellowship
- St. Joseph's Church
- St. Margaret Mary's Church

==== Wan Chai District ====
- Chinese Methodist Church, at No. 36 Hennessy Road
- Island Baptist Church (Protestant, Independent)
- Sky City Church, meeting in the Apex of the Central Plaza
- Tung Fook Church (Protestant)

Southern District

- St. Anne's Church

=== Kowloon and New Kowloon ===
- Holy Trinity Cathedral
- Kowloon Tong Alliance Church (Butterfly Valley), in Christian Alliance International School
- Kowloon Union Church
- Lifehouse International Church Hong Kong (Pentecostal)
- Rosary Church (Roman Catholic)
- St Andrew's Church, Kowloon
- Wing Kwong Pentecostal Holiness Church (Pentecostal)

=== New Territories ===
- Christ the Worker Parish (Roman Catholic)
- Crown of Thorns' Church (Anglican)
- Resurrection Church Sai Kung (Anglican)

==== Sha Tin ====
- Shatin Anglican Church (Anglican)
- Shatin Baptist Church
- Tao Fong Shan Christian Centre

== Christian monasteries ==
- Trappist Haven Monastery, Lantau - Catholic Church (Latin Church)
- Béthanie (Hong Kong) (former sanatorium and monastery)

== Sikh temple ==
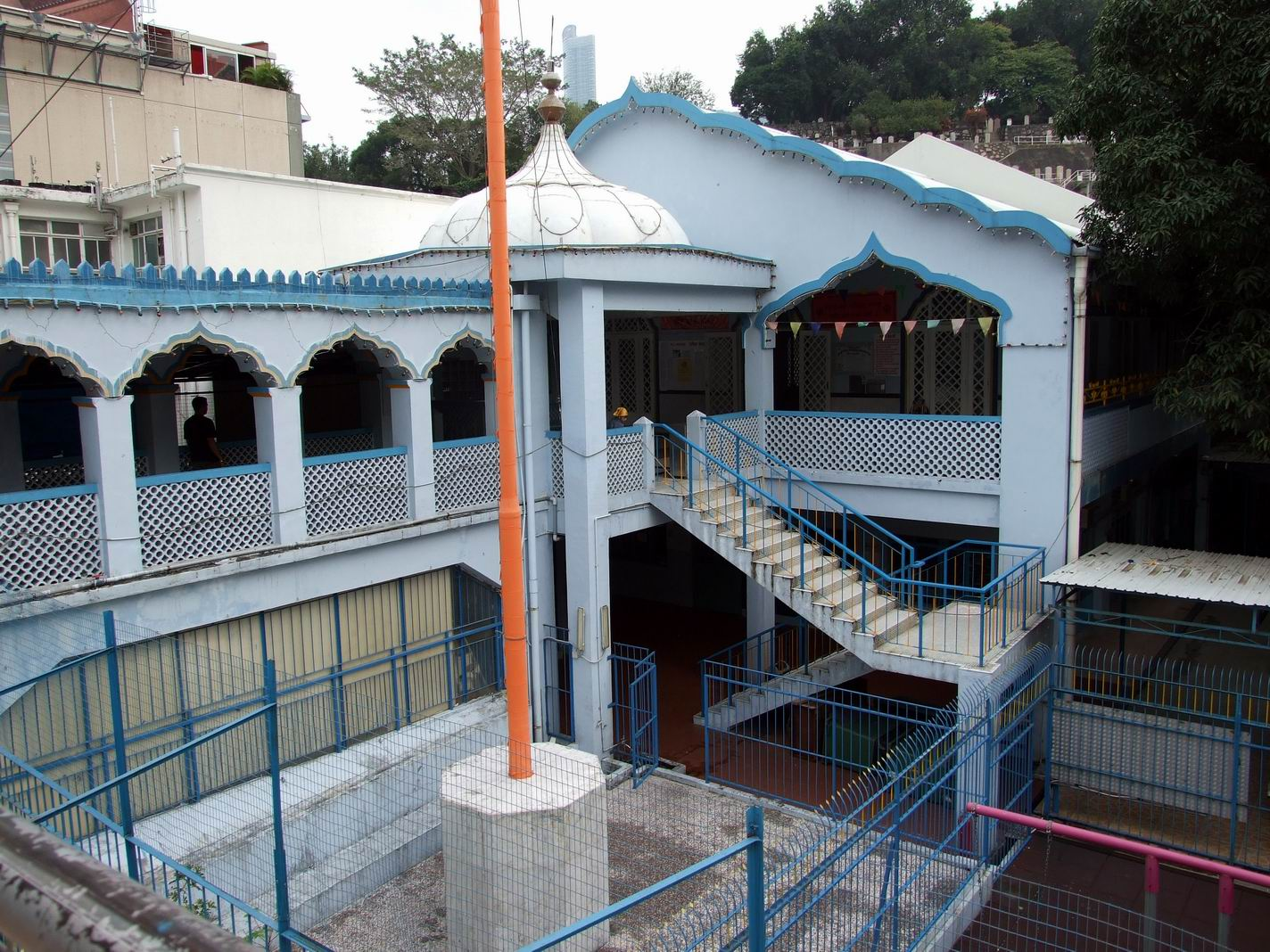
Khalsa Diwan Sikh Temple

- Khalsa Diwan Sikh Temple - at the corner of Queen's Road East and Stubbs Road

== Synagogues ==
- Ohel Leah Synagogue - Robinson Road

== Mosques ==
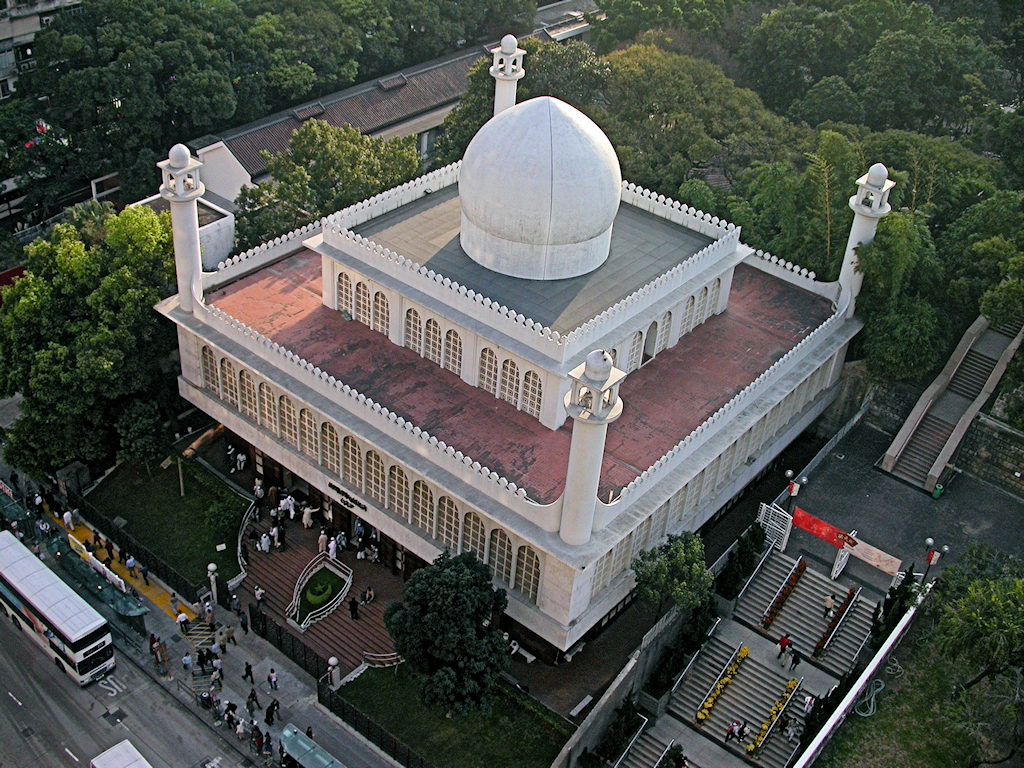
Kowloon Masjid and Islamic Centre along Nathan Road

- Jamia Masjid - Shelley Street, Hong Kong Island
- Kowloon Masjid and Islamic Centre - Nathan Road, Tsim Sha Tsui
- Ammar
- Stanley Mosque
- Chai Wan Mosque
- Ibrahim Mosque

== Church of Jesus Christ of Latter-Day Saints ==
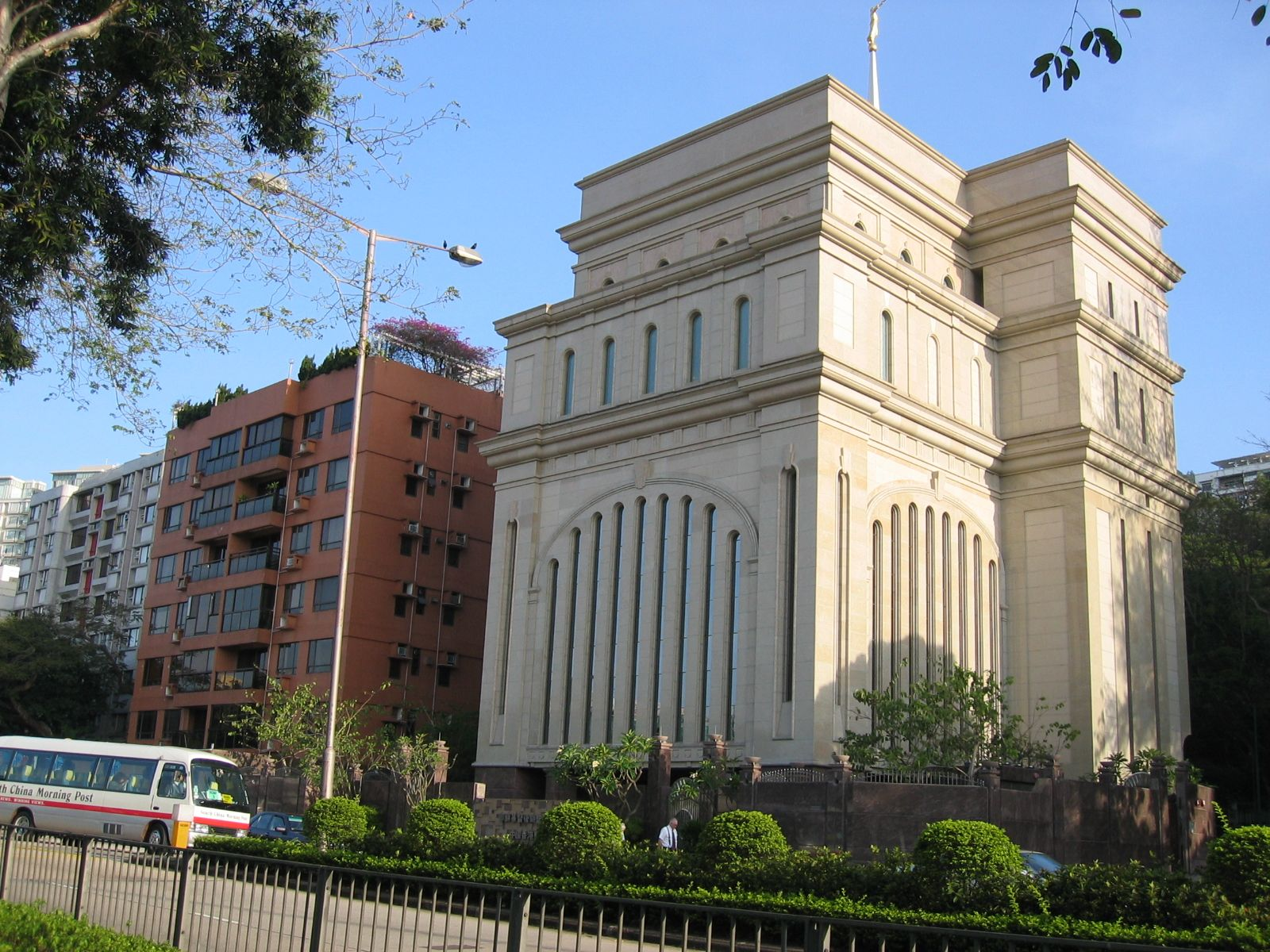
Temple of the Church of Jesus Christ of Latter-day Saints - photo from June 1997

- Hong Kong China Temple located on Cornwall Street, Kowloon Tong

== See also ==
- Air pollution in Hong Kong#Joss paper and incense burning
- Hong Kong Government Lunar New Year kau chim tradition
- Taai Ping Ching Jiu (太平清醮)
- Cheung Chau Bun Festival
- Zhizha & Papier-mache offering shops in Hong Kong
- Religion in Hong Kong
- List of buildings and structures in Hong Kong
- Chinese folk religion
- Chinese ritual mastery traditions
