= List of Catholic churches in Hong Kong =

This is a complete list of Catholic churches in Hong Kong.

== Hong Kong Island ==
- Cathedral of the Immaculate Conception (Mid-Levels)
- Holy Cross Church (Shau Kei Wan)
- Our Lady of Lourdes Church (Pok Fu Lam)
- Our Lady of Mount Carmel Church (Wan Chai)
- Our Lady of the Rosary Church (Kennedy Town)
- St. Anne's Church (Stanley, Hong Kong)
- St. Anthony's Church (Pok Fu Lam Road)
- St. Joseph's Church (Mid-Levels)
- St. Jude's Church (North Point)
- St. Margaret Mary's Church (Happy Valley)
- St. Peter's Church (Aberdeen)
- Christ the King Chapel (Causeway Bay)
- Star of the Sea Church (Chai Wan)
- Immaculate Heart of Mary Chapel (Central)
- Martyr Saints of China Chapel (Shek O)
- Our Lady Seat of Wisdom Chapel (Pok Fu Lam Road)
- Rosaryhill Chapel (Stubbs Road)
- Transfiguration Chapel (North Point)
- Wah Yan College Chapel (Queen's Road East)
- Salesian Mass Centre (Chai Wan Road)
- Quarry Bay Mass Centre (Quarry Bay)
- Tai Koo Shing Mass Centre (Taikoo Shing)
- Wah Fu Estate Mass Centre (Wah Fu Estate)
- Carmelite Monastery (Stanley)
- Cheshire Home (Chung Hom Kok)

== Kowloon ==
- Mary Help of Christians Church (Ma Tau Wai)
- Mother of Good Counsel Church (San Po Kong)
- Our Lady of China Church (Tai Kok Tsui)
- Rosary Church (Tsim Sha Tsui)
- Resurrection Church (Kwun Tong)
- St. Bonaventure Church (Tsz Wan Shan)
- St. Francis of Assisi Church (Sham Shui Po)
- St. James' Church (Yau Tong)
- St. John the Baptist Church (Kwun Tong)
- St. Joseph's Church (Kowloon Bay)
- St. Lawrence's Church (Cheung Sha Wan)
- St. Mary's Church (Hung Hom)
- St. Peter's Church (Tsim Sha Tsui)
- St. Teresa's Church (Kowloon Tong)
- Notre Dame Chapel (Ma Tau Wai)
- St. Charles' Chapel (Sham Shui Po)
- St. Francis Xavier Chapel (Choi Wan Estate)
- St. Ignatius Chapel (Yau Ma Tei)
- St. Joseph's Chapel (Kowloon Tong)
- St. Vincent's Chapel (Wong Tai Sin)
- Christ the Worker Mass Centre (Ngau Tau Kok)
- Diocesan Pastoral Centre for the Disabled (Ho Man Tin)
- Holy Family Mass Centre (Choi Hung Estate)
- Holy Spirit Mass Centre (Ho Man Tin)
- Immaculate Heart of Mary Mass Centre (Po Tat Estate)
- Ling To Mass Centre (Ho Man Tin)
- Maryknoll Secondary School Mass Centre (Kwun Tong)
- Our Lady of Lourdes Mass Centre (Cheung Sha Wan)
- Our Lady Queen of Angels Mass Centre (Shun Lee Estate)
- St. Bonaventure College Mass Centre (Tsz Wan Shan)
- St. Edward's Mass Centre (Lam Tin)
- St. Eugene de Mazenod Mass Centre (To Kwa Wan)
- St. Patrick's Mass Centre (Wang Tau Hom)
- St. Paul's Mass Centre (Yau Ma Tei)

== New Territories ==
- Annunciation Church (Tsuen Wan)
- Holy Redeemer Church (Tuen Mun)
- Holy Martyrs and Blessed of China Mass Centre (Wo Che Estate)
- Immaculate Heart of Mary Church (Tai Po)
- Mother of Christ Church (Sheung Shui)
- Sacred Heart Church (Sai Kung)
- SS. Cosmas and Damian Church (Tsuen Wan)
- SS. Peter and Paul Church (Yuen Long)
- St. Alfred's Church (Sha Tin)
- St. Andrew's Church (Tseung Kwan O)
- St. Benedict's Church (Sha Tin)
- St. Francis Church (Ma On Shan)
- St. Jerome's Church (Tin Shui Wai)
- St. Joseph's Church (Fanling)
- St. Stephen's Church (Ha Kwai Chung)
- St. Thomas the Apostle Church (Tsing Yi)
- St. Vincent Church (Clear Water Bay)
- Epiphany of Our Lord Chapel (Sham Chung)
- Holy Family Chapel (Chek Keng)
- Immaculate Conception Chapel (Wo Mei, Sai Kung)
- Immaculate Conception Chapel (Tai Long Village)
- Saint Zhang Dapeng Chapel (Tai Po)
- St. John The Apostle Chapel (Kwai Chung)
- St. Joseph's Chapel (Yim Tin Tsai, Sai Kung)
- St. Wu Guosheng Chapel (Cho Yiu Chuen)
- Adam Schall Residence Mass Centre (Sha Tin)
- Saint Anna Wang Mass Centre (Tai Po)
- Shek Lei Pui Mass Centre (Shek Lei Estate)
- St. Andrew’s Catholic Primary School Mass Centre (Tseung Kwan O)
- St. Jude's Mass Centre (Kam Tin)
- St. Matthew the Apostle Mass Centre (Tuen Mun)
- Star of the Sea Mass Centre (Sai Wan, Sai Kung)
- Hung Shui Kiu Shung Tak Catholic English College Mass Centre (Hung Shui Kiu)

== Outlying Islands ==
- Epiphany Church (Mui Wo)
- Our Lady of Fatima Church (Cheung Chau)
- Visitation Church (Tung Chung)
- Our Lady of Lourdes Chapel (Yung Shue Wan)
- Our Lady of Perpetual Help Chapel (Tai O)
- Our Lady Queen of Peace Chapel (Ping Chau)
- Trinity Chapel (Discovery Bay)

== See also ==
- Diocese of Hong Kong
- Places of worship in Hong Kong
- Historic churches of Sai Kung Peninsula
