= Kwan Tai temples in Hong Kong =

Temples to Guan Yu

There are several Kwan Tai temples (Chinese: 關帝廟) in Hong Kong. Kwan Tai, the Cantonese spelling of Guan Yu, is worshiped in these temples.

Note 1: A territory-wide grade reassessment of historic buildings is ongoing. The grades listed in the table are based on updates and of 8 June 2023. The temples with a "Not listed" status in the table below are not graded and do not appear in the list of historic buildings considered for grading.
Note 2: While most probably incomplete, this list of Kwan Tai temples is tentatively exhaustive.

Location	Notes	Status	References	Photographs
Shau Kei Wan temple cluster. On the hillside of Shau Kei Wan Road. Near No. 8 Chai Wan Road, Shau Kei Wan 22.275908°N 114.228240°E	Kwan Tai Temple (關帝廟) Built in 1976. Part of a cluster of six temples built on a flattened hilltop by the Shau Kei Wan Kaifong Advancement Association (筲箕灣街坊福利促進會). A statue of Red Hare, Kwan Tai's horse, stands in front of the temple. The temple is adjacent to a Kwun Yam temple.	Nil grade		
Near the southern junction of Old Main Street Aberdeen and Aberdeen Main Street, Aberdeen 22.247261°N 114.156269°E	Kwan Tai and Kwun Yum shrine Part of the "Guardians of Aberdeen" group of small temples and shrines	Not listed		
Nathan Road, Mong Kok 22.317612°N 114.169774°E	Emperor Guan Temple on Nathan Road, Mong Kok (旺角關帝廟) Temporary shrine erected during the 2014 Hong Kong protests	Not listed		
No.158, Hai Tan Street, Sham Shui Po 22.326537°N 114.161552°E	Mo Tai Temple, Sham Shui Po (深水埗關帝廟) aka. Kwan Tai Temple Managed by the Chinese Temples Committee	Grade II		
On the hill, off Tai Wo Hau Road, Kwai Chung 22.365765°N 114.125418°E	Kwan Tai Temple, Tai Wo Hau (大窩口關帝廟)	Not listed		
Tsing Chuen Wai, Lam Tei, Tuen Mun District 22.422807°N 113.982331°E	Village shrine of a walled village. Tin Hau, Kwan Tai, and a Qing official are worshipped in the village shrine.	Not listed		
Castle Peak Road – So Kwun Wat, So Kwun Wat, Tuen Mun District 22.370805°N 113.994709°E	Kwan Shing Tai Kung (關聖帝宮)	Not listed		
At Western White Tiger Pass (西白虎坳) aka. Yi Au Tsai (二坳仔) Along MacLehose Trail Section 10, Tai Lam; 22.395445°N 114.029593°E	Kwan Tai Temple (關帝廟); The temple is part of a set of three built by villagers at the north of today's Tai Lam Chung Reservoir, on the main routes to Tin Fu Tsai, Tai Hang Village (大坑村), and Kan Uk Tei, with a will that their trips to the markets would be safe. The other two temples are Ma Neung Temple (媽娘廟, a Tin Hau Temple), and Pak Kung Temple (伯公廟) aka. White Tiger Pass Temple (白虎坳廟).	Not listed		
Ha Tsuen Shi (廈村市), Ha Tsuen, Yuen Long District 22.446888°N 113.993256°E	Kwan Tai Temple, Ha Tsuen Shi (廈村市關帝廟)	Grade II		
Mong Tseng Wai, Ping Shan, Yuen Long District 22.476585°N 114.005515°E	Yuen Kwan Tai Temple, Mong Tseng Wai (玄關帝廟) Dedicated to Yuen Tai/Pak Tai and Kwan Tai	Grade I		
No. 121 Shui Tsiu San Tsuen (水蕉新村), Shap Pat Heung, Yuen Long District 22.424714°N 114.028296°E	Fuk Hing Tong (福慶堂) A shrine of the walled village, which also acts as the general ancestral hall of the villagers.	Grade III		
Shui Tsiu Lo Wai (水蕉老圍), Shap Pat Heung, Yuen Long District 22.426395°N 114.031887°E	Kwan Tai Temple, Shui Tsiu Lo Wai (十八鄉水蕉老圍關帝宮)	Not listed		
Cheung Shing Street, Yuen Long Kau Hui 22.448276°N 114.032943°E	Yuen Kwan Yi Tai Temple (玄關二帝廟) Probably built in 1714. Commonly known as Pak Tai Temple, it is dedicated to Yuen Tai/Pak Tai and Kwan Tai (Lord Guan). The temple functions as an ancestral hall and a temple of Sai Pin Wai. Village meetings are also held there.	Grade I		
Cheung Po, Pat Heung, Yuen Long District 22.417940°N 114.070604°E	Kwan Tai Temple, Cheung Po (長莆關帝聖宮)	Not listed		
Tseung Kong Wai, Ha Tsuen, Yuen Long District 22.450025°N 113.987918°E (approximate location)	Mo Tai Temple, Tseung Kong Wai (元朗祥降圍武帝寶殿); Shrine of the walled village.	Not listed		
Jockey Club Road, north of Fanling Wai 22.499995°N 114.135405°E	Sam Shing Temple (粉嶺三聖宮) For the worship of three deities: Pak Tai (main deity of the temple), Kwan Tai, and Man Cheong (文昌). The temple was moved to So Kwun Po (掃管埔) in the late Ming dynasty (1368–1644) and moved back to the present site in 1948.	Grade III		
No. 146 Lin Ma Hang Tsuen, Sha Tau Kok 22.550684°N 114.181483°E	Kwan Tai Temple (蓮麻坑關帝宮) Only temple in the village.	Nil grade		
Ting Kok, Tai Po District 22.474050°N 114.218801°E	Mo Tai Temple, Ting Kok (汀角武帝宮) Built in 1785	Grade III		
Sheung Wun Yiu, Tai Po 22.436218°N 114.163949°E	Mo Tai Temple, Sheung Wun Yiu (大埔上碗窰武帝殿)	Not listed		
Ha Wai (下圍), Tap Mun Chau 22.471425°N 114.359887°E	Kwan Tai Kung (關帝宮); The temple complex comprises three temples in two buildings: the first building is a Tin Hau temple, built in 1737, to which an annex was later added, housing a Kwan Tai temple (left side on the picture). On its left, Shui Yuet Kung, built in 1788, is dedicated to Kwun Yam and the Earth God.	Grade II		
Cheung Chau 22.206073°N 114.032026°E	Kwan Kung Pavilion (關公忠義亭) Built in 1973	Not listed		
Kat Hing Back Street, Tai O 22.254704°N 113.862194°E	Kwan Tai Temple (大澳關帝古廟) Adjacent to Tin Hau Temple (left side)	Grade II		
Tong Fuk, Lantau Island 22.228061°N 113.931327°E	Kwan Tai Temple, Tong Fuk (塘福關帝廟)	Not listed		

== See also ==
- Martial temple
- Man Mo temples in Hong Kong
- Hip Tin temples in Hong Kong
- Tin Hau temples in Hong Kong
- Places of worship in Hong Kong
