= STBC =

STBC can stand for:

- Samavesam of Telugu Baptist Churches, — a denomination of Christian churches in India
- Space–time block code, a form of space–time code used in wireless telecommunications
- Shatin Baptist Church, a Christian church in Hong Kong
- Star Trek: Bridge Commander, a computer game
- Sulu Tawi-Tawi Broadcasting Corporation, a television company in the Philippines
