= St. Benedict's Church, Hong Kong =

Catholic church in Hong Kong

St. Benedict's Church
- 聖本篤堂
- Location: 7 Kong Pui Street, Sha Tin, New Territories
- Country: Hong Kong
- Denomination: Roman Catholic

History
- Status: Parish Church
- Founded: 30 December 1990
- Dedication: St. Benedict of Nurcia
- Consecrated: 20 February 1993

Administration
- Diocese: Hong Kong

Clergy
- Bishop: Stephen Chow
- Priest: Issac Noh KMS

St. Benedict's Church (Chinese: 聖本篤堂) is a Roman Catholic church located in Sha Tin, New Territories, Hong Kong.

The church is dedicated to St. Benedict of Nursia, and the church was consecrated on 20 February 1993.

== History ==
On 29 August 1987, Cardinal John Baptist Wu, Bishop of Hong Kong, announced the sub-division of the Sha Tin area into 3 parishes. In the same year, on 6 September 1987, the first Holy Mass was celebrated in the covered playground of the Immaculate Heart of Mary College inside Jat Min Chuen, with around 300 parishioners.

The ground breaking ceremony of the church was officiated by Rev. Gabriel Lam, Vicar General of Hong Kong, after 2 years, the church was consecrated on 20 February 1993 by Cardinal John Baptist Wu, together with Archbishop Dominic Tang of Guangzhou, a visiting Archbishop from South Africa, and 80 other concelebrating priests.

In the same time, Cardinal Wu appoints Rev. John F. Ahearn, Priest of the Maryknoll Society, as the first Parish Priest of St. Benedict's Church.

== Pastoral Team ==
Post	Name	Diocese / Religious Order
Parish Priest	Rev. Fr. Issac Noh Hyun Chul	Korean Foreign Missions Society
Assistant Parish Priest	Rev. Fr. Xavier Demolliens	Paris Foreign Missions Society
Assistant Parish Priest	Rev. Fr. Joseph Huang Li Wei	Society of the Divine Word
Resident Priest	Rev. Fr. Edward Yu	Diocese of Hong Kong
Service on Sundays	Rev. Fr. Peter Choy	Diocese of Hong Kong
Permanent Deacon	Rev. Deacon David Choi Wai San	Diocese of Hong Kong

== See also ==
- List of Catholic churches in Hong Kong
