= The Vine Church =

Coordinates: 22.2764°N 114.1765°E

The Vine
- The Vine Church
- The Vine
- Location: Vine Centre, 29 Burrows Street, Wan Chai, Hong Kong
- Country: Hong Kong
- Denomination: Non-denomintional Evangelical
- Website: thevine.org.hk

History
- Founded: January 1997
- Founder(s): John Henry Snelgrove, Tony Read

Clergy
- Pastor: Andrew Gardener (Senior pastor)

The Vine Church is a non-denominational church located in the Wanchai District of Hong Kong.

The Vine Band is notable for the "upbeat rock" worship music it plays, and has recently undertaken a tour through Southeast Asia.

== See also ==
- Union Church, Hong Kong
