= Mary Help of Christians Church, Kowloon =

Mary Help of Christians Church
- 進教之佑堂
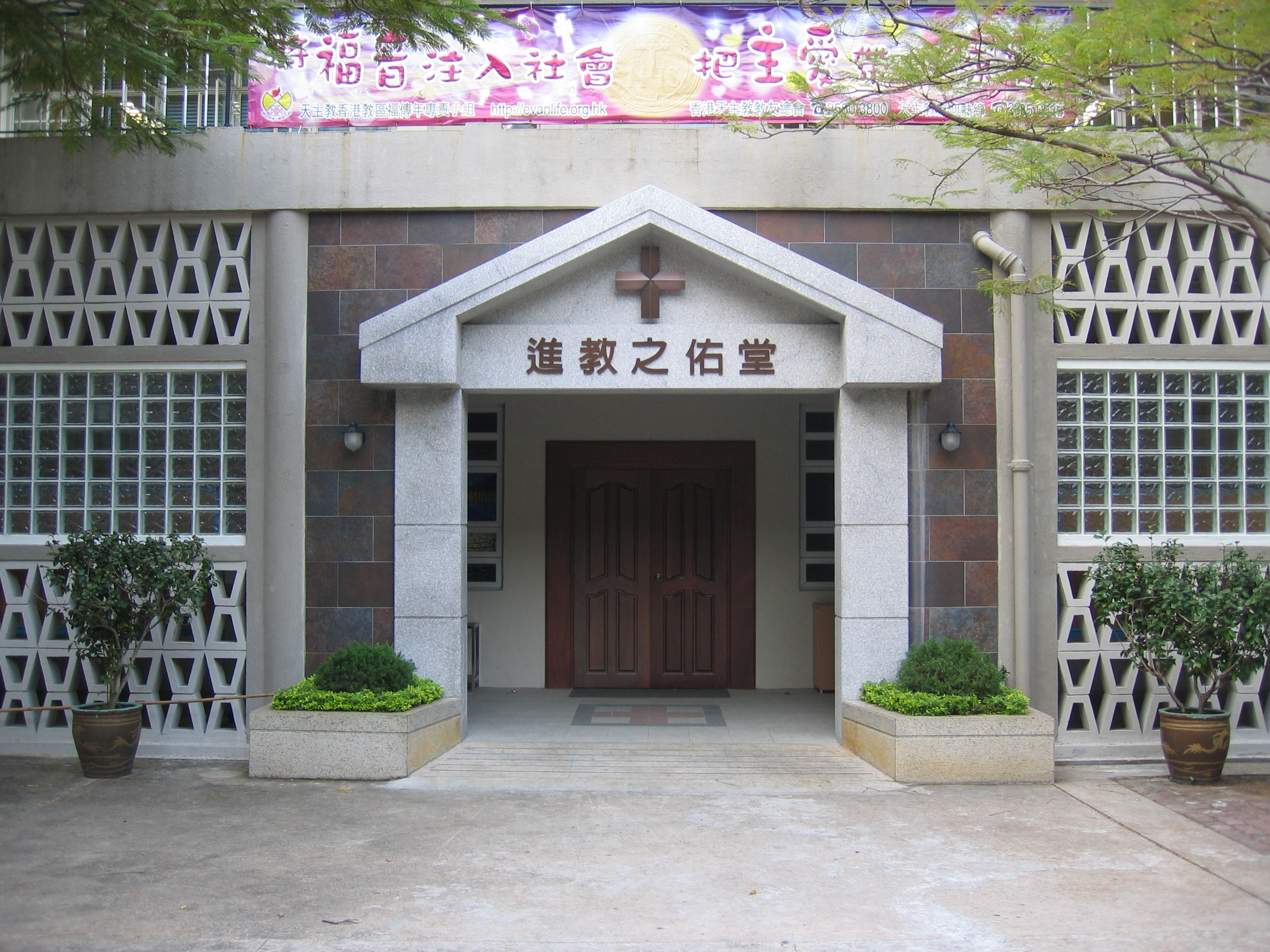
- Location: 16, Tin Kwong Road, Kowloon, Hong Kong
- Country: Hong Kong
- Denomination: Roman Catholic
- Website: mhocp.catholic.org.hk

History
- Status: Parish Church
- Founded: 1953; 73 years ago
- Dedication: Mary, Help of Christians

Administration
- Diocese: Hong Kong

Clergy
- Bishop: Stephen Chow
- Priest: Denis Anson Kong SDB

Mary Help of Christians Church (Chinese: 進教之佑堂) is a Roman Catholic church located in Tang King Po School, Ma Tau Wai, Hong Kong.

== History ==
According to the parish's website, in 1952, Mr. Tang King Po donated $1 million and joined with the Salesian Fathers to negotiate with the government on proposing to build the phase 1 of Tang King Po School at a site to the east of Ma Tau Wai hill.

In 1953, the Salesians allocated funding to construct the second phase of the school on the vacant site to the north west of the phase 1 building, which included a 300-seat chapel, which is the predecessor of the existing Mary Help of Christians Church.

In 1967, the chapel was renamed Tang King Po School Chapel, as the subsidiary of St. Teresa Church in Kowloon Tong. It was subsequently renamed Mary Help of Christians Chapel in 1970.

On 1 January 1991, on the Solemnity of Mary, Mother of God. John Baptist Wu, then Bishop of Hong Kong, erected the chapel as the provisional parish. It was hen formally declated as parish on 14 November 1993.

The church is also the only Catholic church in Hong Kong that holds a weekly Sunday Holy Mass according to the Extraordinary Form of the Roman Rite, also known as the Tridentine Rite.

== See also ==
- Ma Tau Wai
- Tang King Po School
- List of Catholic churches in Hong Kong
