= Tang King Po School =

Coordinates: 22.3202°N 114.1848°E

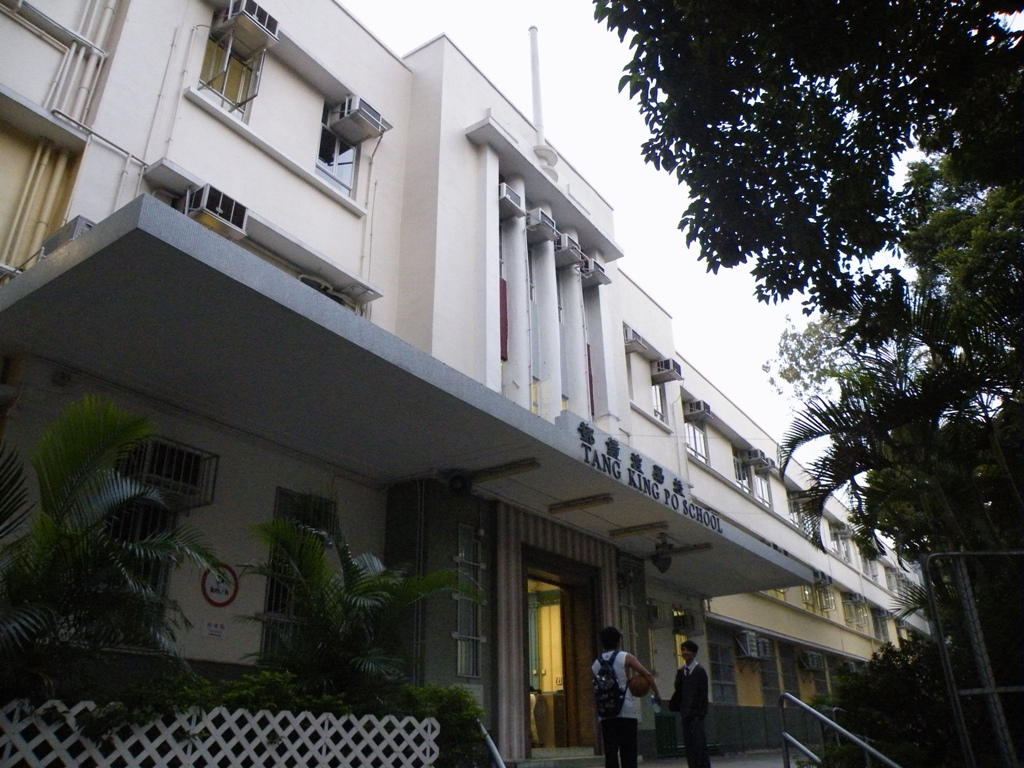
- 16, Tin Kwong Road, Kowloon

Information
- Other name: 鄧鏡波學校
- Type: Aided
- Motto: 立己立人 (To promote your desire to set goal as a benevolent person to others.) and UT PALMA FLOREBIT (To flourish like a palm tree.)
- Established: 23 July 1953
- School district: Kowloon City
- President: Rev. Bro.Joseph Cheung
- Principal: Lee Kam Hung
- Faculty: About 82 staffs
- Grades: Form 1 – Form 6
- Gender: Male only
- Enrollment: About 1360 students
- Language: Chinese & English
- Campus size: around 1,7000 sq m
- Affiliation: Society of St. Francis de Sales, Salesians of Don Bosco and Catholicism
- Information: (852) 2712 5171
- Website: http://www.tangkingpo.edu.hk/

Tang King Po School (Chinese: 鄧鏡波學校) is a secondary school in the Ma Tau Wai area of Kowloon City District, in Hong Kong. The school was founded by the Salesians in 1953 with a donation from businessman Tang King Po in 1952. The school was officially opened at 23 July 1953 by the then-Hong Kong Governor Alexander Grantham.

== Early days in 1953 ==
When the school started, it had three classes for the occupation, including 'clothes industry', 'printing Industry' and 'shoes industry'.

== Class Structure ==
Tang King Po School run 31 classes in 2014–2015 academic year. Details are shown below:

Secondary Year	Secondary 1	Secondary 2	Secondary 3	Secondary 4	Secondary 5	Secondary 6
Number of Classes	5	5	5	5	5	6

== Student Performance ==
Overall, students in this school have excellent performance. All Form 3 students pass the Junior Secondary Education Assessment and the allocation rate to Form 4 is 100%. Percentage of Form 5 students with a passing grade in Hong Kong Certificate of Education Examination is 75%. And the percentage of Form 7 students with a passing grade in Hong Kong Advanced Level Examination is around 70 to 80%. More than 70% of Form 7 graduates obtain a tertiary degree.

In 2005-2006, Form 3 students performed exceptionally well in Territory-wide System Assessment, their English level was way above than the average in Hong Kong, their Chinese level was 2% higher than the average in Hong Kong, and their Math compliance rate was 98%.

99.9% of students in the school year participate in five different types of activities or competitions, including religious, sports, music, academic and interests. Students receives awards in school activities, including academic swimming, basketball, athletics, table tennis, badminton, Music Festival, Speech competition, English Poetry Writing Competition, visual art exhibitions, student physical fitness award program and so on.

== Faculty ==
Current school principal has a master's degree of Education.

Number of Teachers: 75
Ratio of Teacher and Students: Approx. 1 to 18 students

Qualification of Teacher:

- 100% had received formal teacher training
- 93% with bachelor's degree
- 32% with master's degree or above
- 87% English teachers were majoring in English; All English teachers have met the requirement of Language Proficiency Assessment for Teachers
- 60% English teachers with master's degree

Teaching Experience:

- 15 years (23%)
- 11–15 years (33%)
- 6–10 years (24%)
- 1–5 years (20%)

== Campus ==
zh-yue form part of the campus. It is also a parish.

== See also ==
- Ma Tau Wai
- Mary Help of Christians Church, Kowloon
