= Cheung Po =

Village of Hong Kong

Coordinates: 22.416774°N 114.072548°E

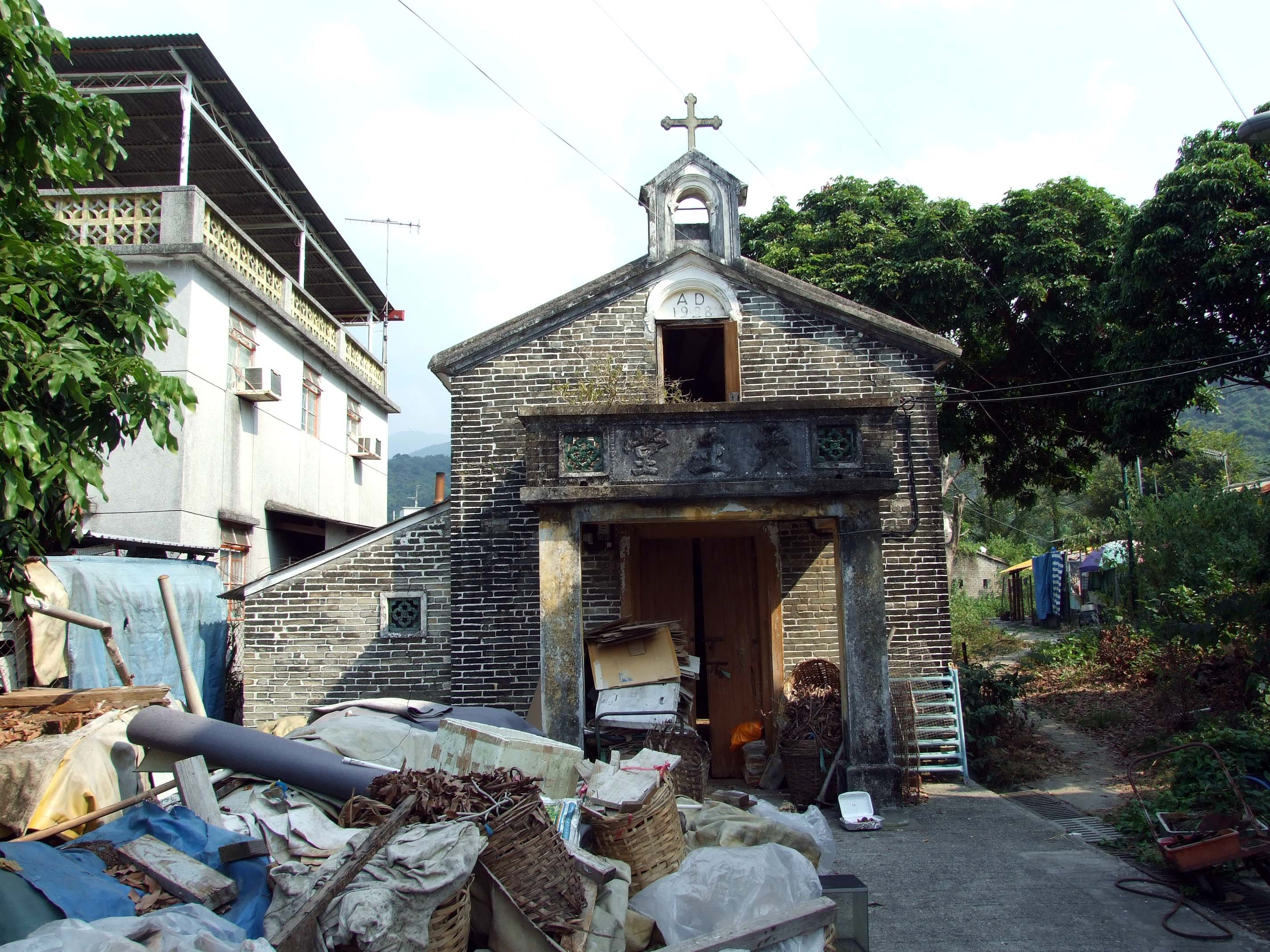
St. John's Chapel in Cheung Po in October 2012

Cheung Po (Chinese: 長莆) is a village in Pat Heung, Yuen Long District, Hong Kong.

== Administration ==
Cheung Po is a recognized village under the New Territories Small House Policy.

== Population ==
The inhabitants of Cheung Po are all Hakkas, composed of five clans of four surnames: two clans surnamed Tang (鄧) and the others surnamed Tsang (曾), Cheung (張) and Wong (黃). Most of their ancestors migrated from other parts of Hong Kong between the 1740s and the 1770s.

== Features ==
The St. John's Chapel (聖若望小堂) in Cheung Po was built in 1928. In addition to being used for religious services, it also served as an elementary school for children from Cheung Po and nearby villages. The school closed down in 1951 and the chapel was vacated in the 1980s. The chapel is a Grade II historic Building.

Other old buildings in the village include Houses Nos. 3–6, Houses Nos. 9–11, Houses Nos. 15-16 and a Kwan Tai Temple.
