= Our Lady of Fatima Church, Hong Kong =

Catholic church in Hong Kong

Coordinates: 22°12′36″N 114°01′47″E

Our Lady of Fatima Church
- 花地瑪聖母堂
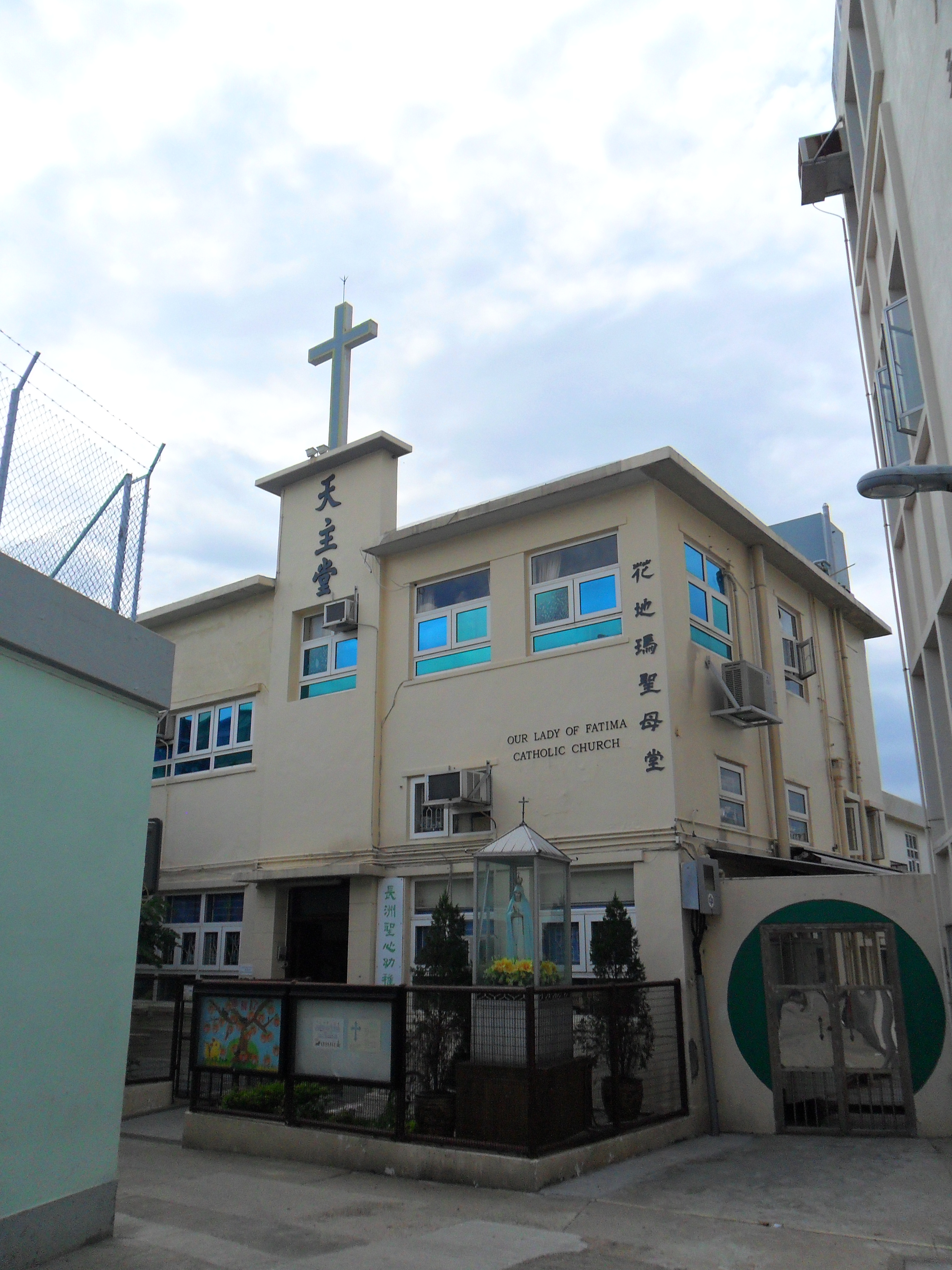
- Our Lady of Fatima Church
- Location: 1 Church Road, Cheung Chau
- Country: Hong Kong
- Denomination: Roman Catholic

History
- Founded: 1935
- Consecrated: 13 October 1952

Administration
- Diocese: Hong Kong

Clergy
- Priest: Rev. Fr. Jojo Garcia SDB

Our Lady of Fatima Church (Chinese: 花地瑪聖母堂) is a Roman Catholic parish church located in Cheung Chau Island, Hong Kong.

== Brief History ==
According to the Hong Kong Diocese heritage website, the original church was a simple stone house located at 245 Tai San Street in Cheung Chau.

Until in early 1952, the first church building was constructed at 1 Church Road in Tung Wan, Cheung Chau. The inauguration ceremony was presided over by Auxiliary Bishop Francis Hsu, and Father Luigi Locatelli of the Pontifical Institute for Foreign Missions served as the first parish priest.

In 1959, the church underwent the expansion work, and it was complete on 13 November 1961. The new church was connected to the original church, with a total area of 5,534 square feet and able to accommodate 200 parishioners.

The original church building was used as the Sacred Heart Kindergarten. As part of the extension, one additional floor was also added on the right side of the church to house the Parish Office.

Every October each year, the church will organize a huge festive procession marking the anniversary of the Fatima apparitions.

The church is one of the Hong Kong Diocesan Jubilee Pilgrimage Shrine during the 2000 Jubilee Year and the 2025 Jubilee Year.

== See also ==
- List of Catholic churches in Hong Kong
