= Kwan Kung Pavilion =

Temple in Hong Kong, China

Coordinates: 22.206073°N 114.032026°E

- 關公忠義亭
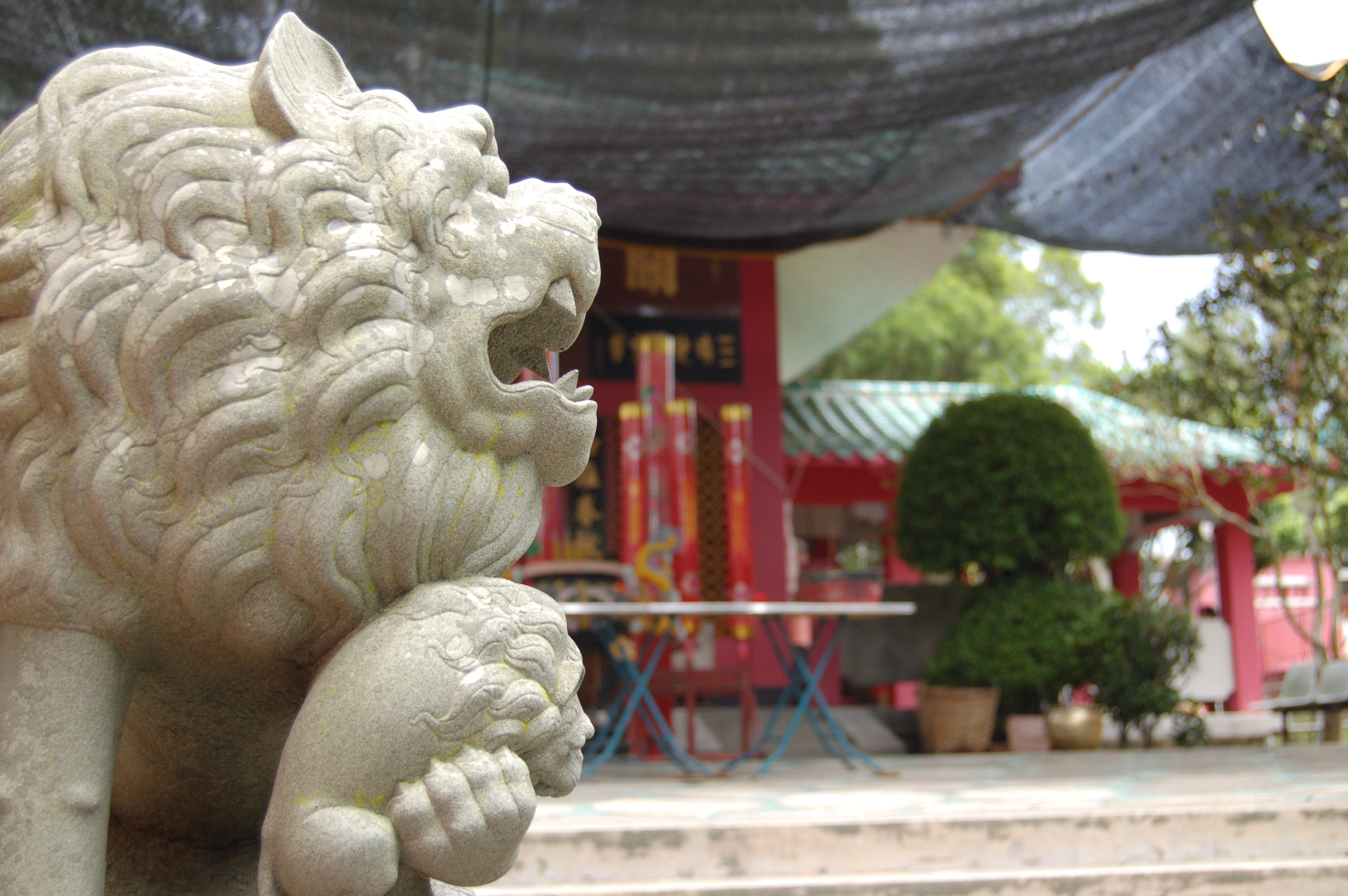
- Kwan Kung Pavilion

Religion
- Affiliation: Chinese folk religion
- Region: Cheung Chau
- Deity: Kwan Kung

Location
- Country: Hong Kong
- Interactive map of Kwan Kung Pavilion

Architecture
- Completed: 1973

Kwan Kung Pavilion
- Traditional Chinese: 關公忠義亭
- Yale Romanization: Gwāan gūng jūng yih tìhng
- Jyutping: Gwaan^{1} gung^{1} zung^{1} ji^{6} ting^{4}

Kwan Kung Pavilion (Jyutping: gwaan1 gung1 zung1 ji6 ting4) is a temple on Cheung Chau island in Hong Kong. It was built in 1973, and is dedicated to the Martial God of War and Wealth, Kwan Tai (also transliterated as Lord Guan or Kwan Kung). His Sabre, The Kwan Dou, is also displayed in the Kwan Kung Pavilion.

The temple contains an eight-feet-tall Kwan Tai statue crafted from a whole piece of camphor wood. There is an incense burner with two dragons in front of the pavilion.

== See also ==
- Martial temple
- Hip Tin temples in Hong Kong
- Kwan Tai temples in Hong Kong
- Places of worship in Hong Kong
