= Lifehouse International Church =

Church in Japan

Coordinates: 35.673858°N 139.70784°E

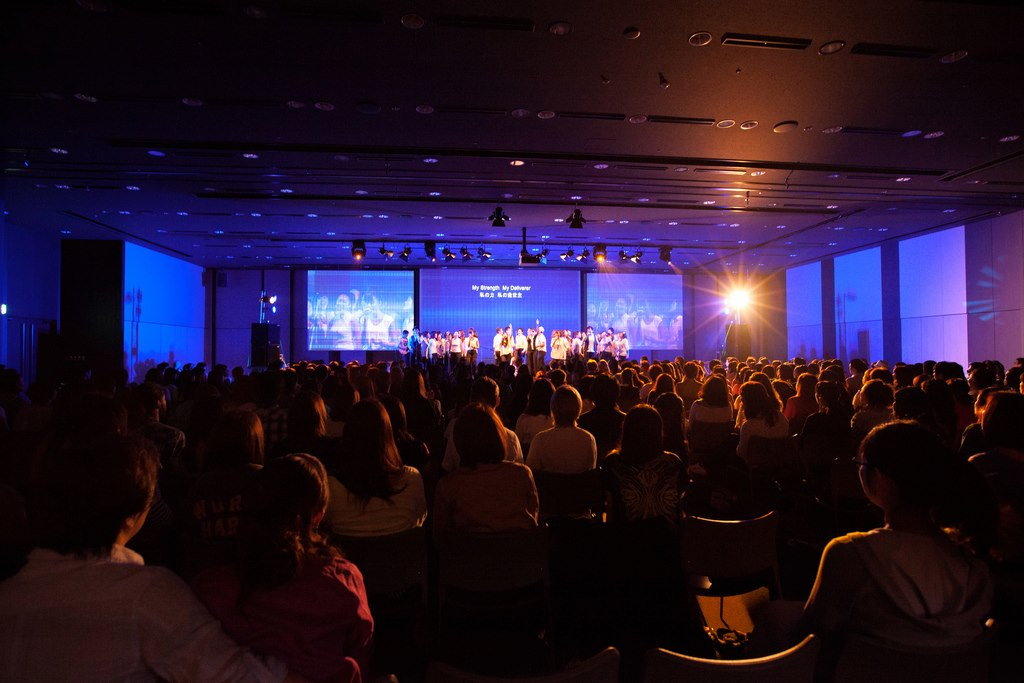
- Lifehouse International Church Tokyo
- Lifehouse International Church
- Location: Tokyo
- Country: Japan; Hong Kong; Indonesia; South Korea; Thailand
- Denomination: Australian Christian Churches
- Website: www.mylifehouse.com

History
- Founded: August 2002

Lifehouse International Church is a contemporary, Pentecostal, multi-site church based in Tokyo, Japan, with campuses across Japan & Asia. It is affiliated with the Australian Christian Churches (ACC). Rod Plummer is the founder and senior pastor of Lifehouse.

== History ==
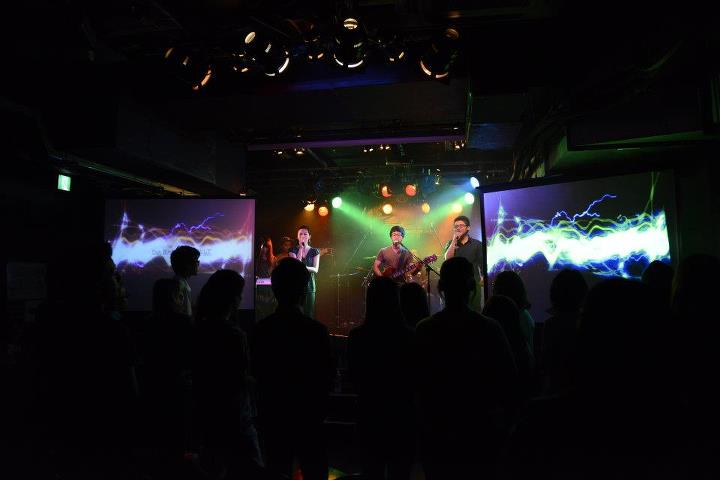
Lifehouse International Church Yokohama – International Church in Yokohama

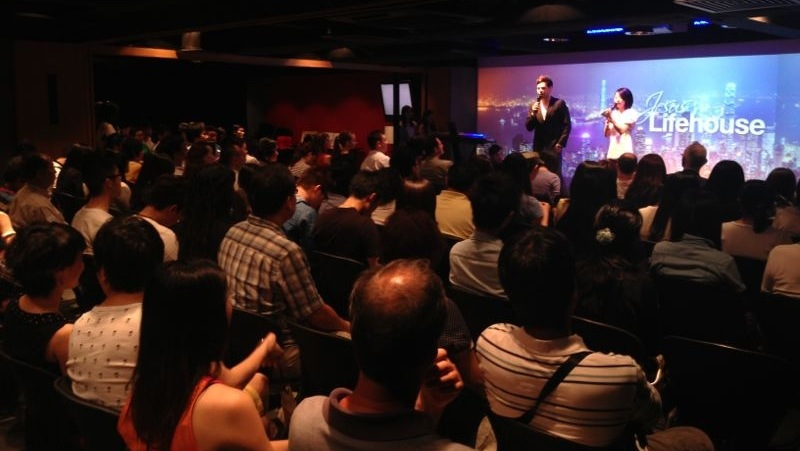
Lifehouse International Church Hong Kong

Lifehouse was founded as Jesus Lifehouse in 2002 by Rod Plummer and his wife Viv in Tokyo, Japan, with a team of 16 people. They have been involved in international missions and planted churches in Thailand and Indonesia before returning to pastor an undisclosed Australian Christian Churches affiliated church in Toowoomba Queensland for 7 years.

== Beliefs ==
Lifehouse is affiliated with the Australian Christian Churches. They follow the Orthodox Creed and believe in the gifts of the Holy Spirit.

== Music ==
Lifehouse Church produces original or original translation of worship songs under the label Lifehouse Worship. Songs are written bilingually in Japanese and English.

== Tohoku Homestay Relief Program ==
In 2011, Lifehouse Church initiated a free homestay program for school and university students affected by the Tōhoku earthquake and tsunami called Tōhoku Relief Home Stay. The program was administered by Lifehouse International Church with support from American Airlines, Qantas, Air New Zealand, All Nippon Airways, Time Out New Zealand, Berlitz Language, ACC International Relief, TAFE NSW, the New Zealand Embassy, and local churches throughout Australia, New Zealand and America.

A total of 210 students were sent to America, Australia and New Zealand during August and September to stay with host families and attend English schools free of charge.
