= Union Church, Hong Kong =

Interdenominational church in Hong Kong

Coordinates: 22.2761°N 114.1581°E

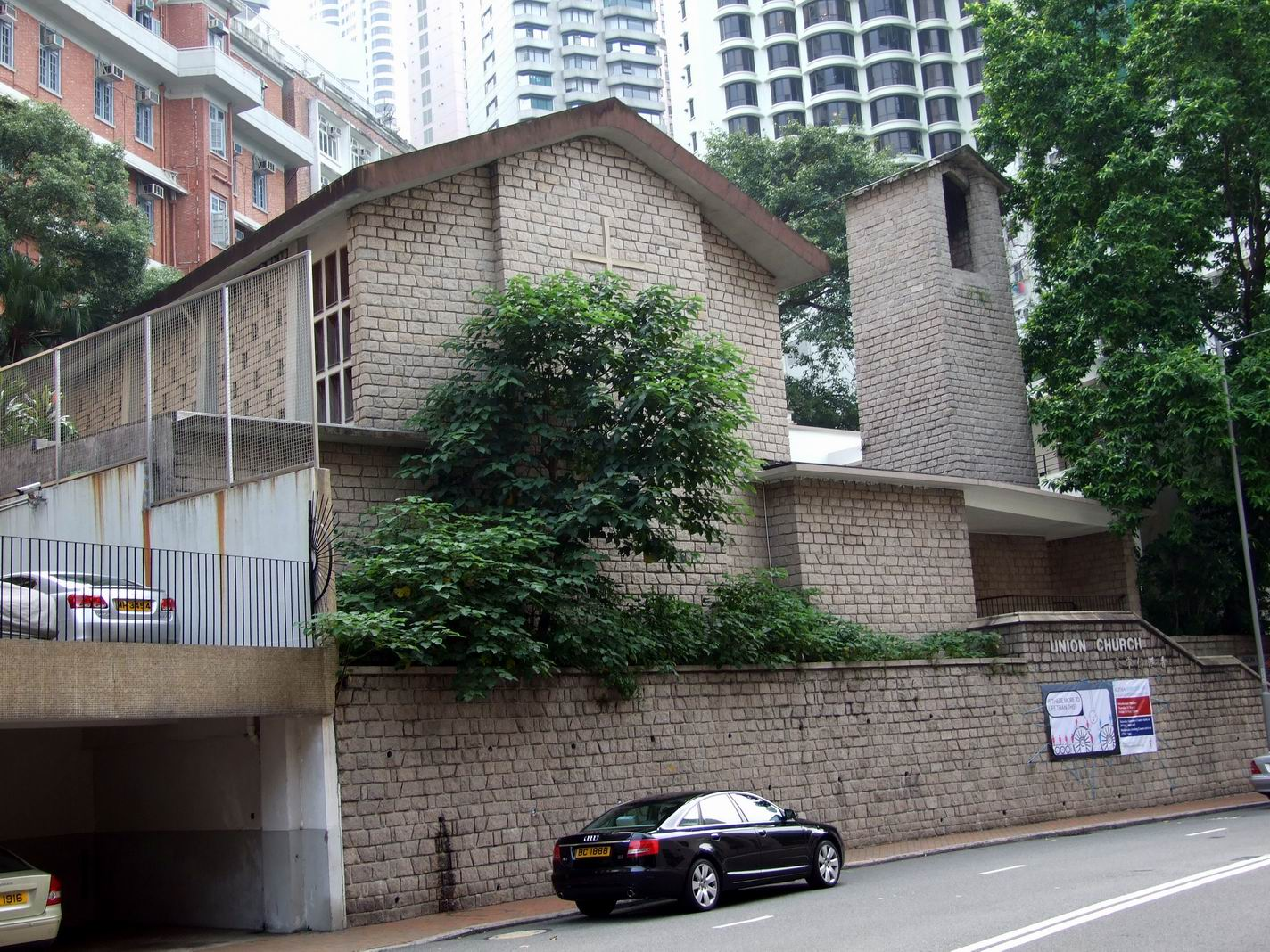
4th generation Union Church building along Kennedy Road.

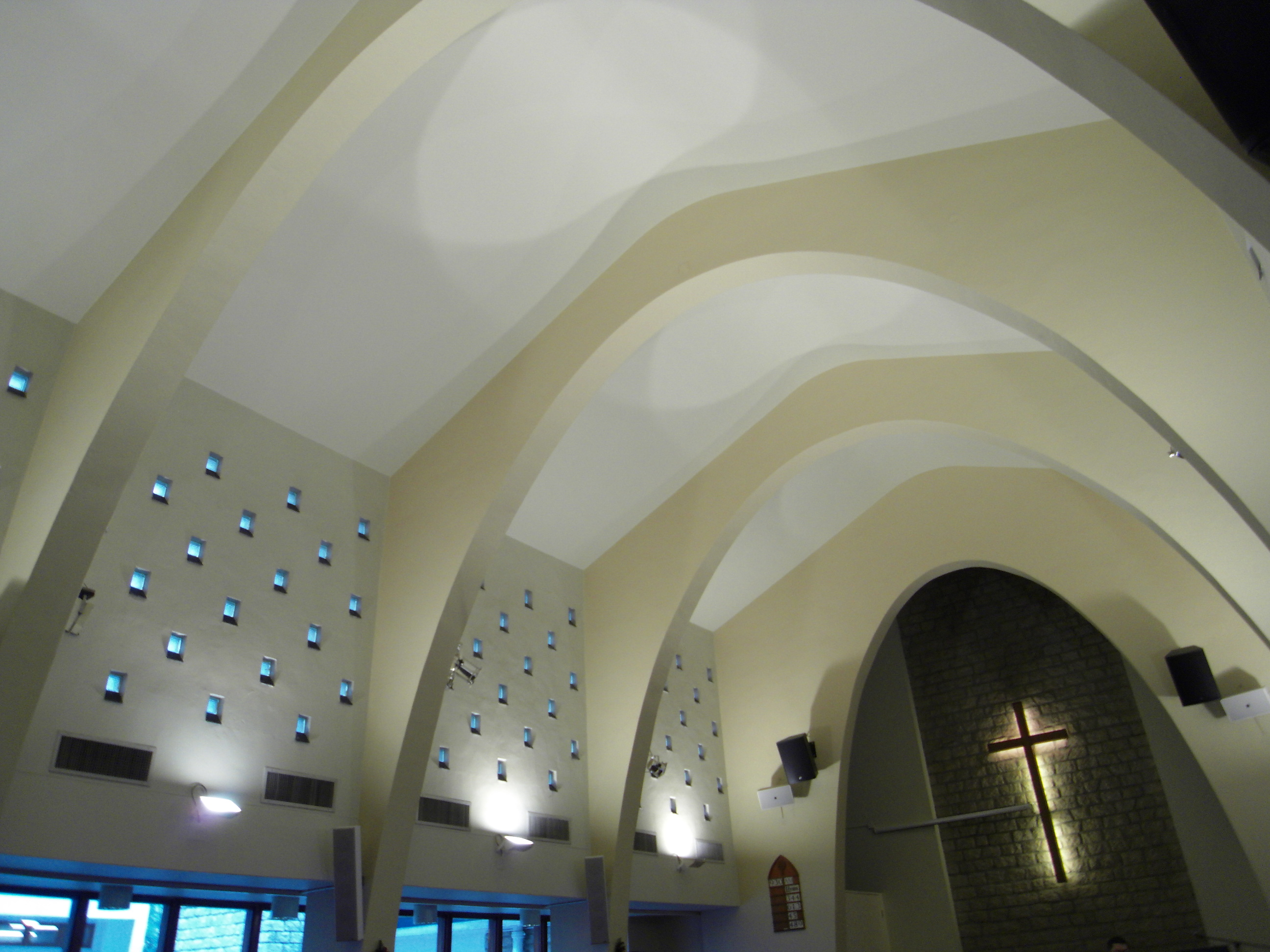
4th generation Union Church building interior featuring Art Deco transverse arches.

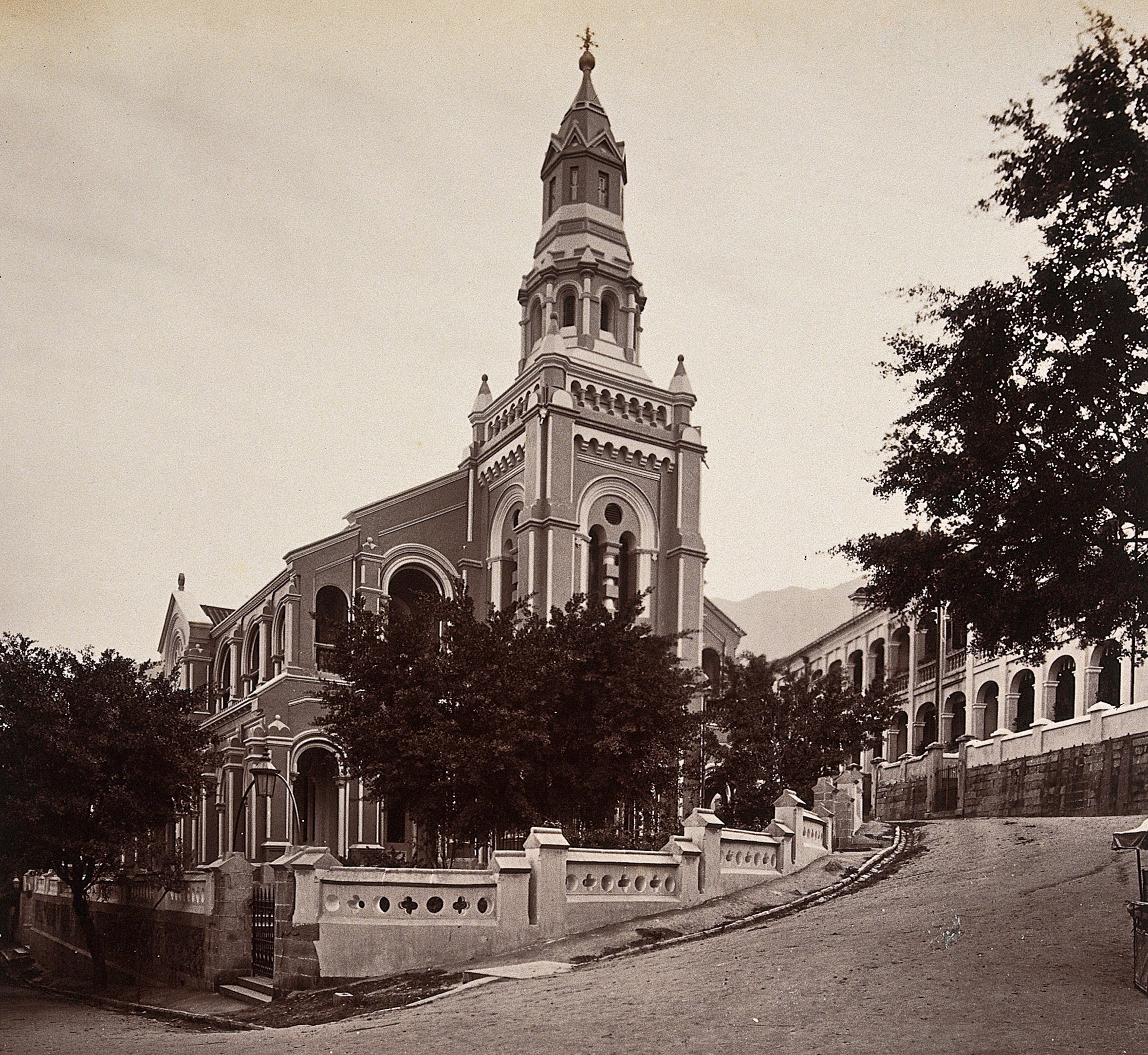
Union Church 2nd generation building at the corner of Staunton Street and Peel Street, photographed by William Pryor Floyd.

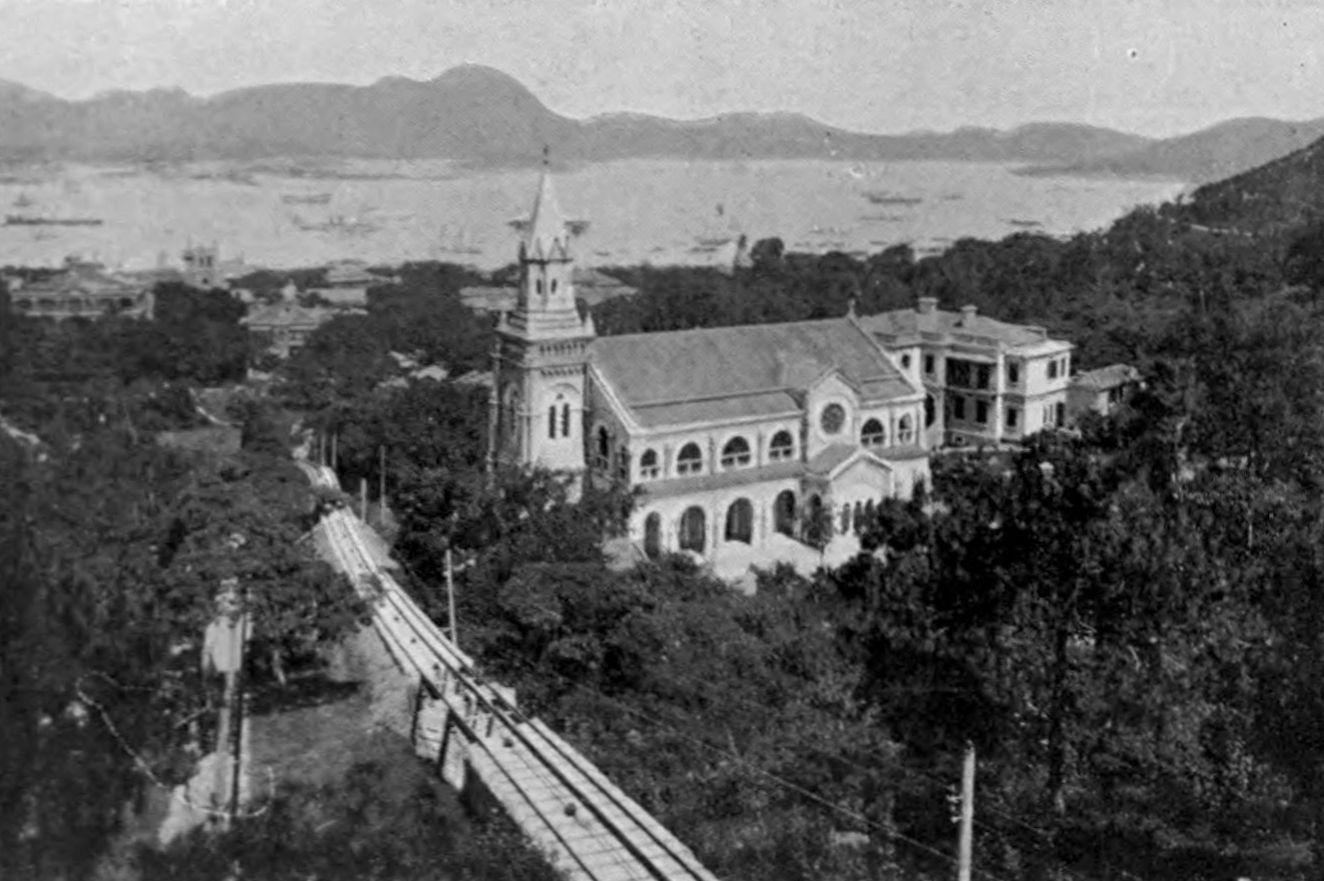
Union Church 3rd generation building next to the Peak Tram line, circa 1908.

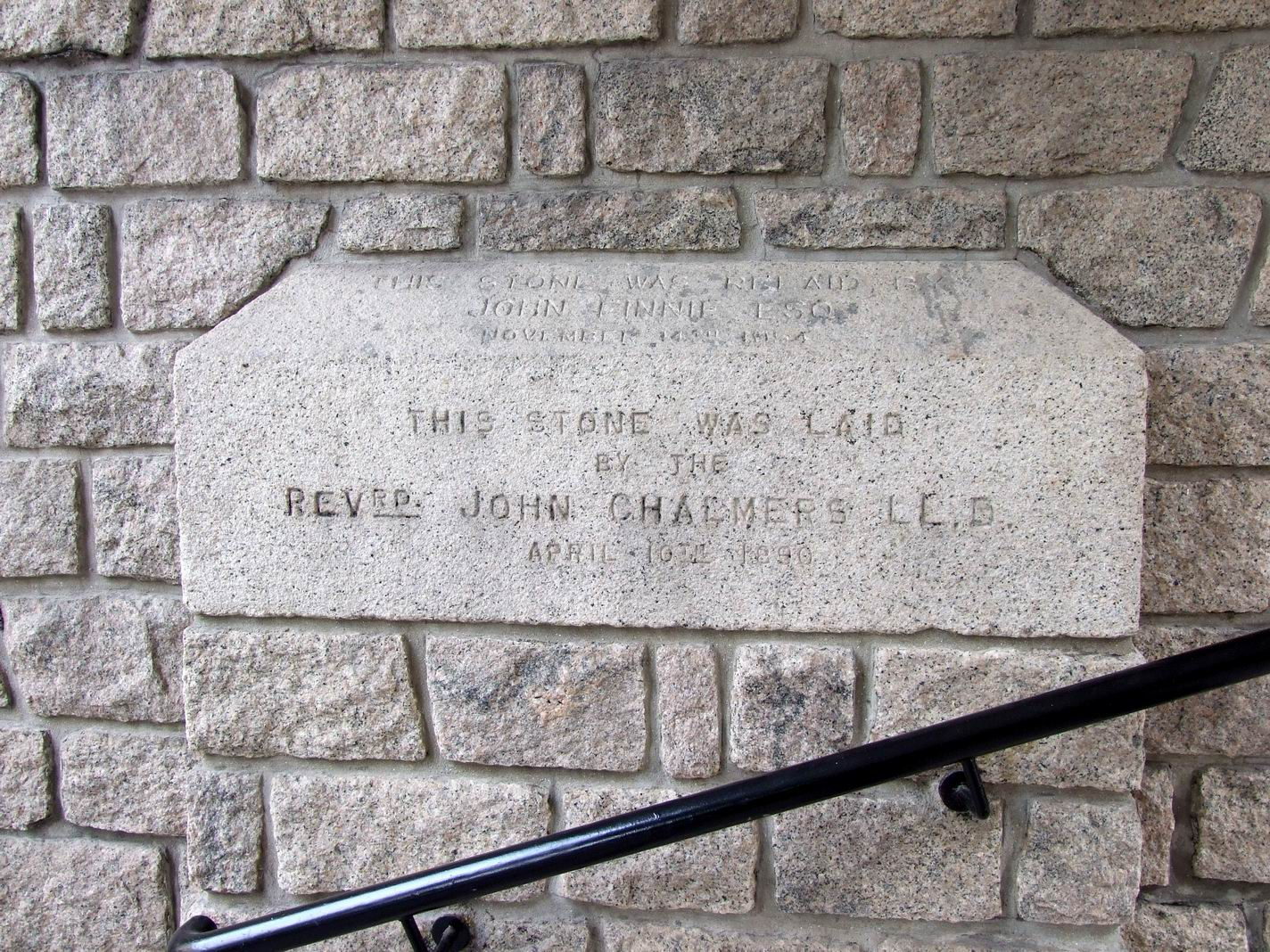
1890 foundation stone of the 3rd generation building, relaid on the 4th generation building in 1954.

Union Church (Chinese: 香港佑寧堂) is an English-speaking, interdenominational church in Hong Kong, which was established in 1844. The latest Union Church building was the 4th generation building. It was located at No. 22A Kennedy Road, Mid-Levels, up the hill from Central and Admiralty, and next to where the Peak Tram bridge intersects with Kennedy Road. Demolition work started in 2017 and a residential building including a church at its base is to be built at the same location.

== History ==
Union Church was founded in 1844 by James Legge, a Scottish sinologist and missionary from the London Missionary Society, who served as pastor from 1844 to 1867 and from 1870 to 1873. The first Union Church building, called 'Union Chapel', was built in 1845 on Hollywood Road. In 1866, the church was relocated to a new site at the corner of Staunton Street and Peel Street (2nd generation building). The church on Staunton Street having become very crowded, it was moved to the site on Kennedy Road in 1890 (3rd generation building), which also included a manse. The new building incorporated much of the materials from the 2nd generation building. The church funded half the costs of building the nearby Kennedy Road stop of the Peak Tram.

The church's religious service was ceased during the Japanese occupation of Hong Kong during World War II, and the pastor, Rev. Kenneth Mackenzie Dow, was interned in Stanley Internment Camp. The church building was severely damaged during that time, and the church was temporarily moved to the Hong Kong Volunteer Defence Corps Officers Mess on Garden Road from 1945 to 1949.

=== 4th generation building ===
The church was subsequently rebuilt (fourth generation building) on the site of the third generation building. The Fellowship Hall and the manse were completed in 1949, the Sanctuary and its bell tower in 1955 and the Annex in 1970. The sanctuary was built in minimalist modern style with references to the Bauhaus school. Internally, it featured transverse arches in Art Deco style.

On 16 March 2014, members decided to demolish the church and redevelop its prime real-estate site.. The last service was held on 27 August 2017.

=== 5th generation building ===
Demolition work started in 2017 and a residential building including the church at its base was built at the same location in collaboration with Henderson Land Development.. The first service was held in September 2023.

== Affiliation ==
Originally a ministry of the London Missionary Society, Union is now an independent congregation, governed by three boards: The Deacon's Court, Committee of Management and Board of Trustees.

== Conservation ==
Before their demolition, the church building and its bell tower were listed as Grade III historic buildings.

== See also ==
- Places of worship in Hong Kong
- Kowloon Union Church
