= St. Anne's Church, Hong Kong =

Catholic church in Hong Kong

Coordinates: 22.2185°N 114.2136°E

St. Anne's Church
- 聖亞納堂
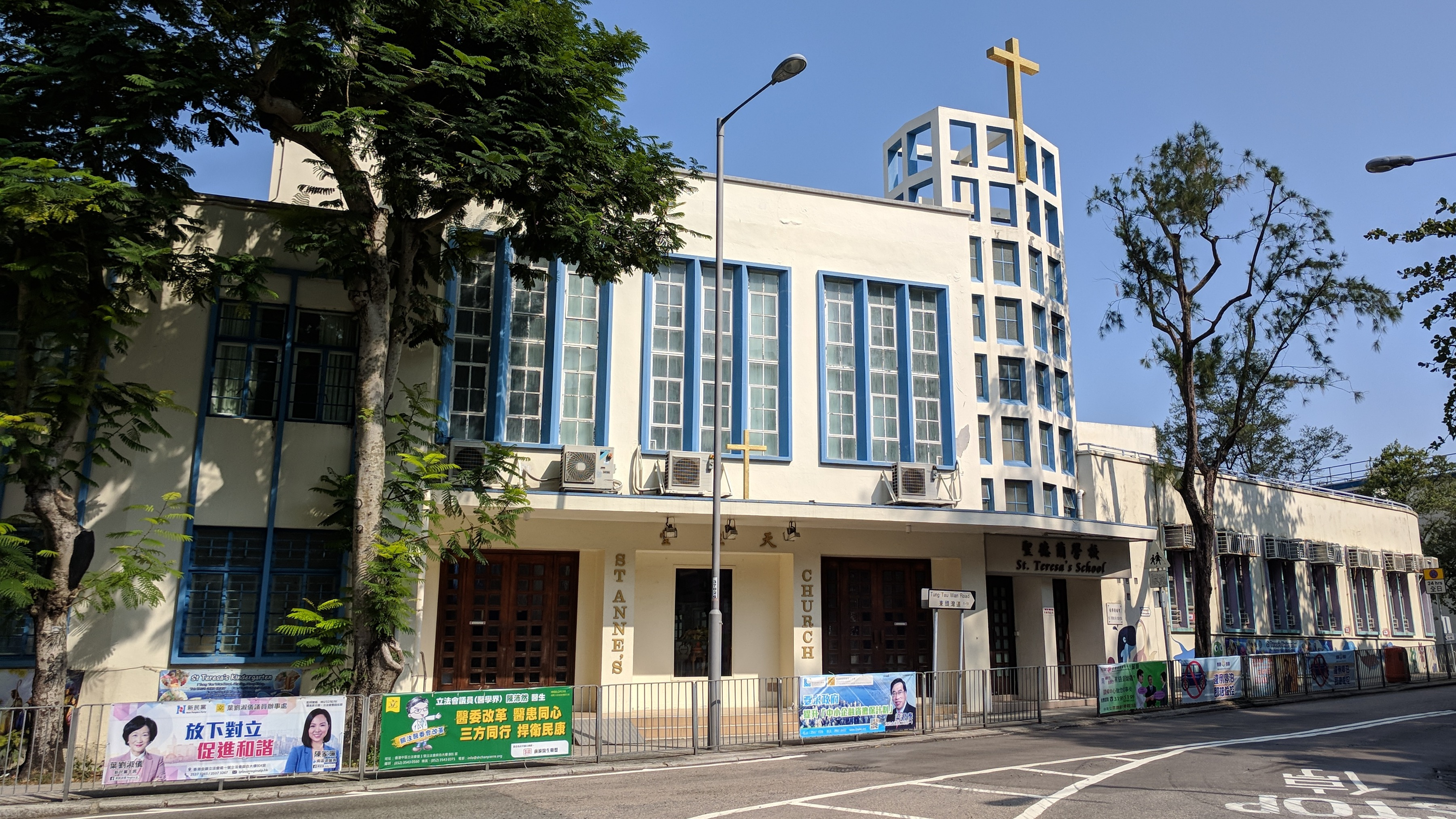
- St. Anne's Church in 2017
- St. Anne's Church
- Location: 1, Tung Tau Wan Road, Stanley
- Country: Hong Kong
- Denomination: Roman Catholic
- Website: https://www.stannes.hk/

Administration
- Diocese: Roman Catholic Diocese of Hong Kong
- Parish: Stanley Parish

Clergy
- Bishop: Stephen Chow
- Priest: Paulus W. Santoso O.Carm

St. Anne's Church is a Roman Catholic church in Hong Kong. It is located at 1 Tung Tau Wan Road, Stanley. It services mainly the Chinese, Filipinos, and expatriates that live in the area. The church was built in 1959.

== History ==
In 1949, the Stanley Parish was established by the Hong Kong Diocese. The church had not existed at the time and the chapel of Discalcled Carmelite Convent was instead used for parish activities.

The construction of St Anne's Church was announced in 1955 and construction was completed in 1959.

On 18 December 1958, the church's corner stone was blessed and laid by Cardinal Gregorio Pietro Agagianian, Prefect of the Congregation for the Propagation of the Faith.

Since 2019, St Anne's Church is now under the administration by the Friars of the Carmelite Order.

== See also ==
- List of Catholic churches in Hong Kong
