= Wun Yiu Village =

Village in Hong Kong

Coordinates: 22.4343°N 114.1637°E

- Traditional Chinese: 碗窰村
- Literal meaning: Bowl kiln village
Transcriptions
Yue: Cantonese
- Yale Romanization: Wún yìuh chyūn
- Jyutping: Wun2 yiu4 cyun1

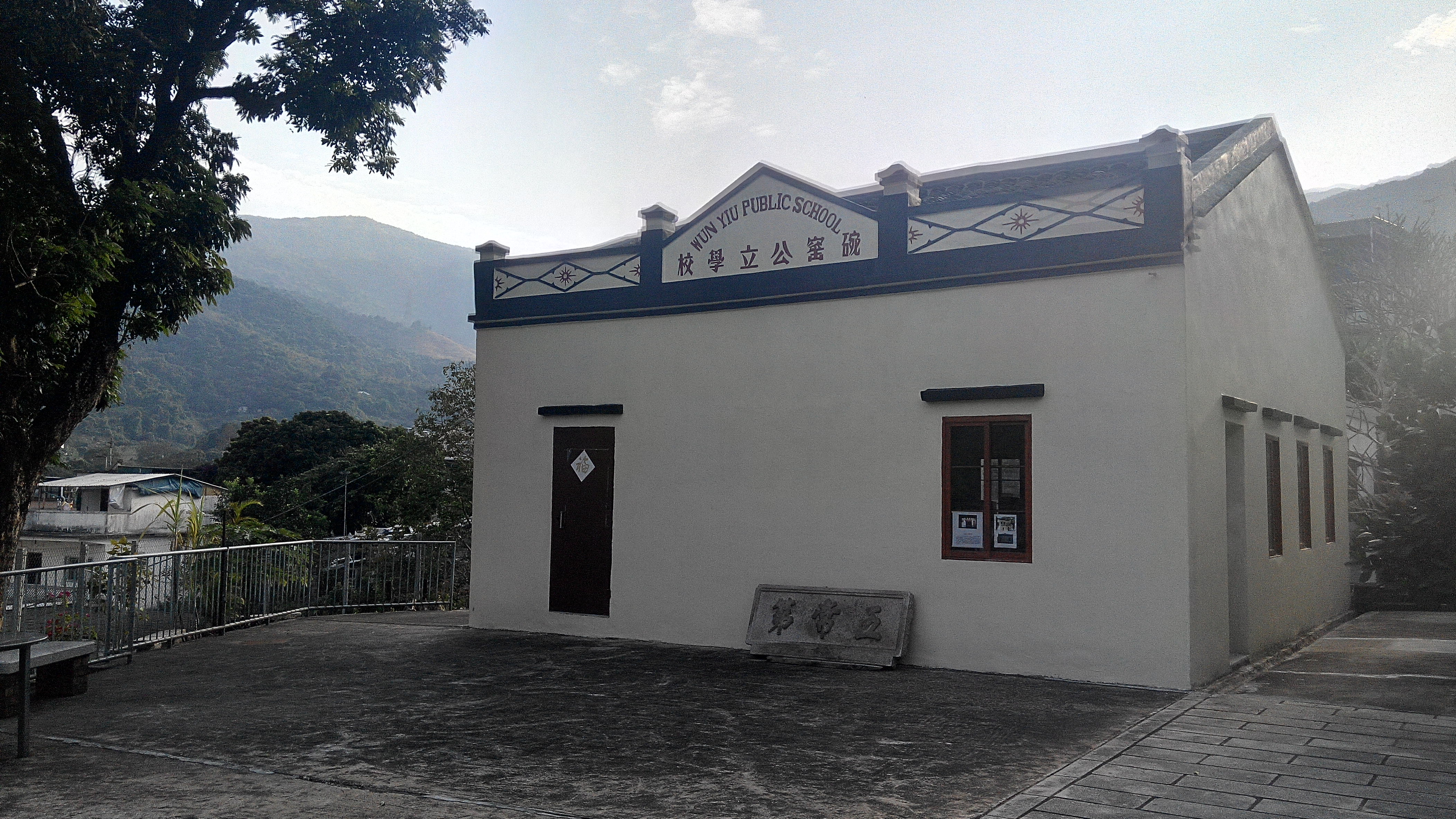
Former Wun Yiu Public School (碗窰公立學校) in Sheung Wun Yiu.

Wun Yiu Village is a village located in Tai Po in Hong Kong. Wun Yiu Village consists of Sheung Wun Yiu (上碗窰) and Ha Wun Yiu (下碗窰).

== Administration ==
Wun Yiu is a recognized village under the New Territories Small House Policy. Wun Yiu is one of the villages represented within the Tai Po Rural Committee. For electoral purposes, Wun Yiu is part of the Tai Po Kau constituency, which is currently represented by Patrick Mo Ka-chun.

== History ==
The area was once a center of porcelain industry in the New Territories.

The clans of Man and Tse began manufacturing blue and white porcelain in the Ming dynasty (1368-1644).

In 1674 (the 13th year of the reign of the Qing dynasty Kangxi Emperor), the Ma Hakka clan, originally from Changle county, Guangdong, settled in Tai Po and purchased the kilns from the Man clan.

At the time of the 1911 census, the population of Ha Wun Yiu was 60; the number of males was 26. The population of Sheung Wun Yiu was 129; the number of males was 53.

Because of the competition from good-quality and inexpensive porcelain produced by other coastal kilns in Guangdong, the kilns at Wun Yiu finally stopped operating in 1932.

== Declared Monuments ==
=== Wun Yiu Pottery Kilns ===
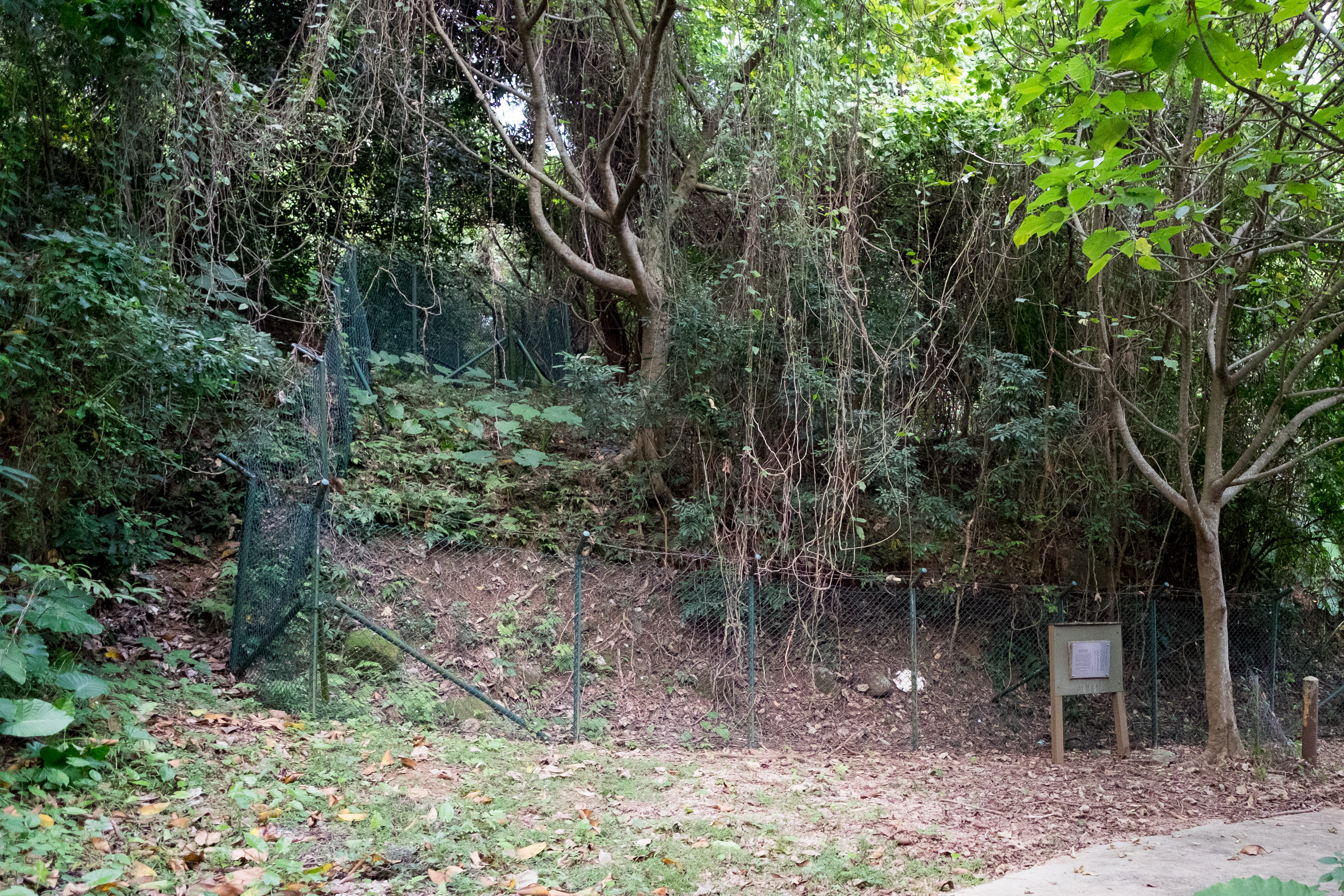
Remains of pottery kiln

The remains of the ancient kilns of Wun Yiu Village have been declared a monument.

In the remains of the ancient kilns, relics illustrating the complete process of porcelain production were discovered during archaeological investigations. These artefacts include china clay quarrying pits, water-mills, animal-driven grinders, clay soaking tanks and dragon kilns.

=== Fan Sin Temple ===
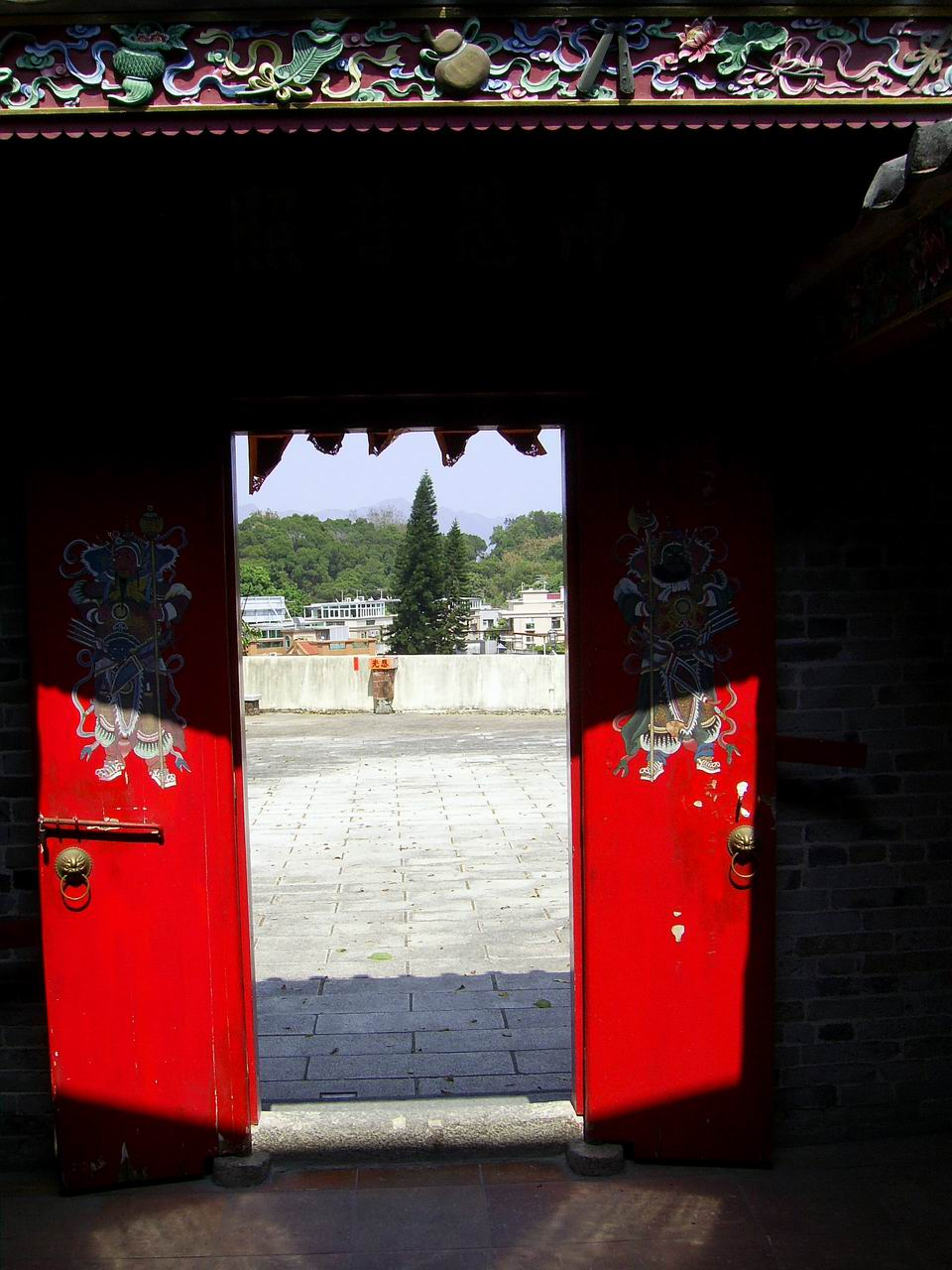
View from Fan Sin Temple towards Sheung Wun Yiu

Fan Sin Temple, alias "Fan Sin Kung" or "Fan Sin Miu", was declared a monument on 30 December 1999.

Fan Sin Temple, located in Sheung Wun Yiu, is the main temple in the villages of the Sheung Wun Yiu and Ha Wun Yiu; it is the only example of worshipping this deity in Hong Kong.

It is uncertain when the temple was constructed. However, according to a wooden plaque hanging at the main hall of the temple, it has a history of over 200 years as the plaque was carved in the geng-xu year of the Qianlong Emperor (1790). It is commonly believed that the Fan Sin Temple was built by the Ma clan to worship Fan Tai Sin Sze, the patron saint of potters.

Windows with iron frameworks were installed on four sides of the temple after World War II.

Many historic relics of the temple were destroyed after a serious fire in mid 1970s. The calligraphy and paintings above the entrance were repainted during a renovation in 1976 after the fire. There is a wooden plaque from 1970 and four commemorative stone plaques which record the restorations in 1897, 1925, 1964 and 1976 respectively.

A further restoration of the temple has recently been carried out and it is now open to the public.

== Wun Yiu Trackway ==
The Wun Yiu Trackway starts at Sheung Wun Yiu Village. It is about 300 metres (980 ft) long. Workers may have used it to transport kaolin from the upper mines down to the workshop before the kiln stopped operation.

== Access ==
Section 8 of the Wilson Trail crosses Sheung Wun Yiu.
