= Shatin Baptist Church =

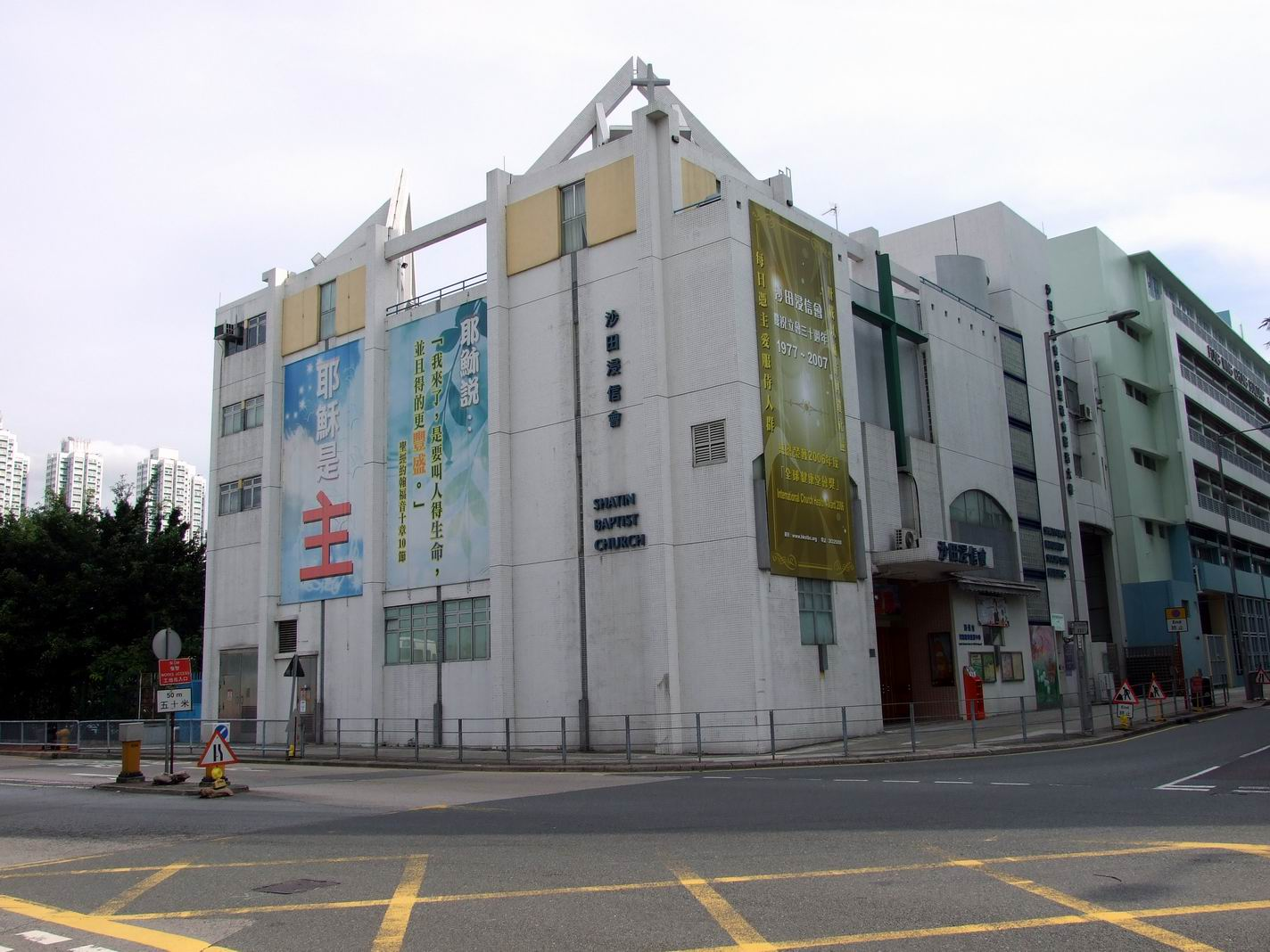
- Shatin Baptist Church at the corner of Wo Che Street and Lek Yuen Street
- Shatin Baptist Church
- 22.3854°N 114.1934°E
- Location: 1 Lek Yuen Street, Sha Tin
- Country: Hong Kong
- Denomination: Baptist
- Website: hkstbc.org

History
- Founded: 1962

Shatin Baptist Church (Chinese: 沙田浸信會) is a Baptist Evangelical multi-site megachurch based in Sha Tin in Hong Kong's New Territories. It is affiliated with the Baptist Convention of Hong Kong.

== History ==
The church was founded in 1962. In 1977, it inaugurated its main building.

Shatin Baptist Church runs a few activities such as L.O.S.T, Children Christendom and hosts the 279th division of the Boys' Brigade.

The Church organisation has campuses in Jordan, Lek Yuen, Siu Lek Yuen, Sha Tin Wai and Ma On Shan.
