= Christ the Worker Parish, Hong Kong =

Roman Catholic church in Hong Kong

Christ the Worker Parish
- 天主教基督勞工堂
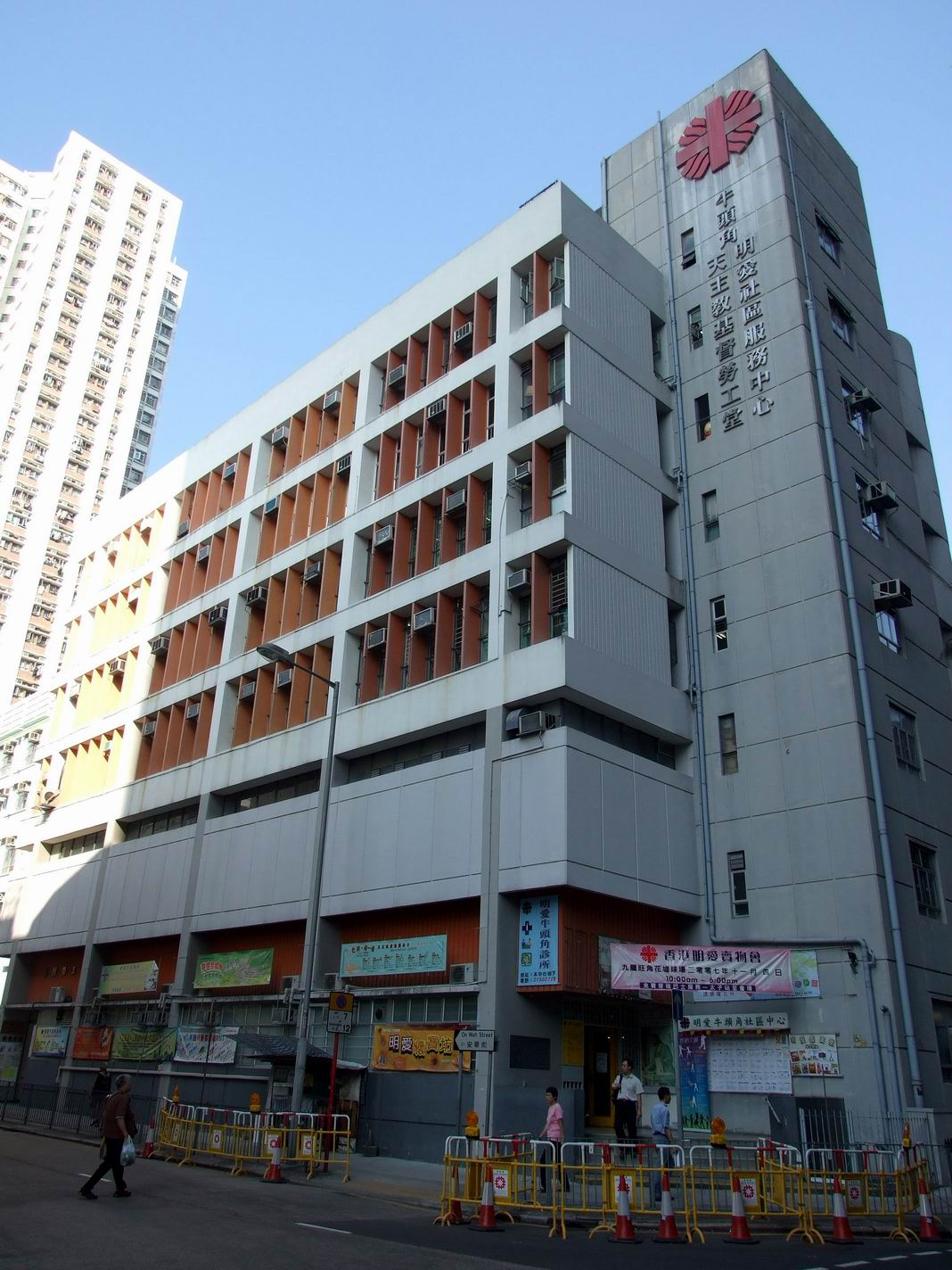
- Location: 1 On Tak Road, Ngau Tau Kok, Kowloon
- Country: Hong Kong

History
- Consecrated: 4 July 1970

Administration
- Diocese: Hong Kong

Clergy
- Priest: Rev. Fr. Mechelle T. Reginio

The Christ the Worker Parish is a local Roman Catholic church in the Special Administrative Region of Hong Kong. The chapel is located inside Ngau Tau Kok Caritas Centre. Her pastoral region extends from Upper Ngau Tau Kok Estate, Lower Ngau Tau Kok Estate, Jordan Valley to Kowloon Bay.

== Brief history ==
- In 1953, the Maryknoll Fathers founded the Maryknoll Mission School in Fuk Wah Village, Ngau Tau Kok. The school was designed and erected by Brother Albert Stauli. Mass service was subsequently started in the chapel of this school. The parish was named “Our Lady Queen of Angels Parish”
- In 1966, Maryknoll Secondary School was founded in Jordan Valley. Our Lady Queen of Angels Parish started a new mass service in the chapel of School. This was the predecessor to the "Christ the Worker Parish".
- In 1970, construction work of the Ngau Tau Kok Caritas Centre was completed. The chapel in Maryknoll Secondary School moved into Ngau Tau Kok Caritas Centre. As most of the residents in the Ngau Tau Kok, Kowloon Bay and Jordan Valley at that time were blue collar workers, the parish was therefore named as “Christ the Worker Parish”.

== Clergy team ==
- Parish Priest: Rev. Fr. Mechelle T. Reginio, CICM
