= Shariah Advisory Council =

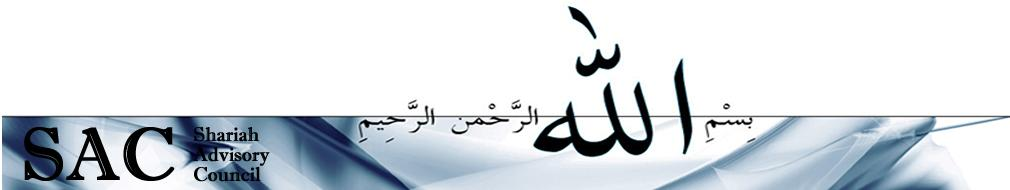
- Founded: 2007
- Type: Islamic Law (Shariah) Advisory Council
- Location: Hong Kong
- Website: arabcci.org/SAC_mission.htm

The Shariah Advisory Council (SAC) was established on 3 August 2007, by The Arab Chamber of Commerce and Industry with the support of the Incorporated Trustees of the Islamic Community Fund of Hong Kong. Its purpose is to help screen and certify as Shariah compliant Hong Kong companies that wish to transact business with the Islamic community. This council is one of the first of its kind established in Hong Kong.

== Islamic business ==
An approved Islamic or company must be approved by a Shariah Advisory Council to show that the organization is in compliance with Shariah. In banking, being Shariah compliant means interest is not paid on deposits or charged on loans. Companies that wish to become approved must comply with Islamic laws regarding tobacco, alcohol, pornography, and other restrictions.

== Organizational leadership ==
The Shariah Advisory Council is made up of experts from various fields with the goal of ensuring companies applying meet the criteria for Shariah Compliance Approval. The council is most active in China and in Hong Kong with the cited goal of increasing Islamic banking and financial interests. The council can be used by interested companies, banks, courts, and arbitration centers to verify compliance with Shariah. In 2015, it is estimated that trade between China and Arab countries will reach US$100 billion.
