= List of mosques in Hong Kong =

This is a list of mosques in Hong Kong, China.

Location of mosques in Hong Kong

Name (Chinese name)	Image	Location	Year (CE)	Remarks
Jamia Mosque (些利街清真寺)		Mid-Levels	1890 (original building); 1905 (current building)	Near Central station
Kowloon Mosque (九龍清真寺)		Tsim Sha Tsui	1896: 1896 (original building); 1984 (current building)	Near Tsim Sha Tsui station
Ammar Mosque (愛群清真寺)		Wan Chai	1967 (original building); 1981 (current building)	Near Causeway Bay station / Wan Chai station
Stanley Mosque (赤柱清真寺)		Stanley	1937	Near Ocean Park station
Chai Wan Mosque (柴灣清真寺)		Chai Wan	1963	Near Chai Wan station
Ibrahim Mosque (亞伯拉罕清真寺)		Mong Kok	2013	Near Mong Kok station
Sheung Shui Mosque and Islamic Centre (上水清真寺暨伊斯蘭中心)		Fanling–Sheung Shui New Town	(under construction)	Near Sheung Shui station

== See also ==
- Islam in Hong Kong
- Incorporated Trustees of the Islamic Community Fund of Hong Kong
- List of mosques in China
