= Hong Kong Islamic Youth Association =

Religious organization based in Wan Chai, Hong Kong, China

- 香港伊斯蘭青年協會
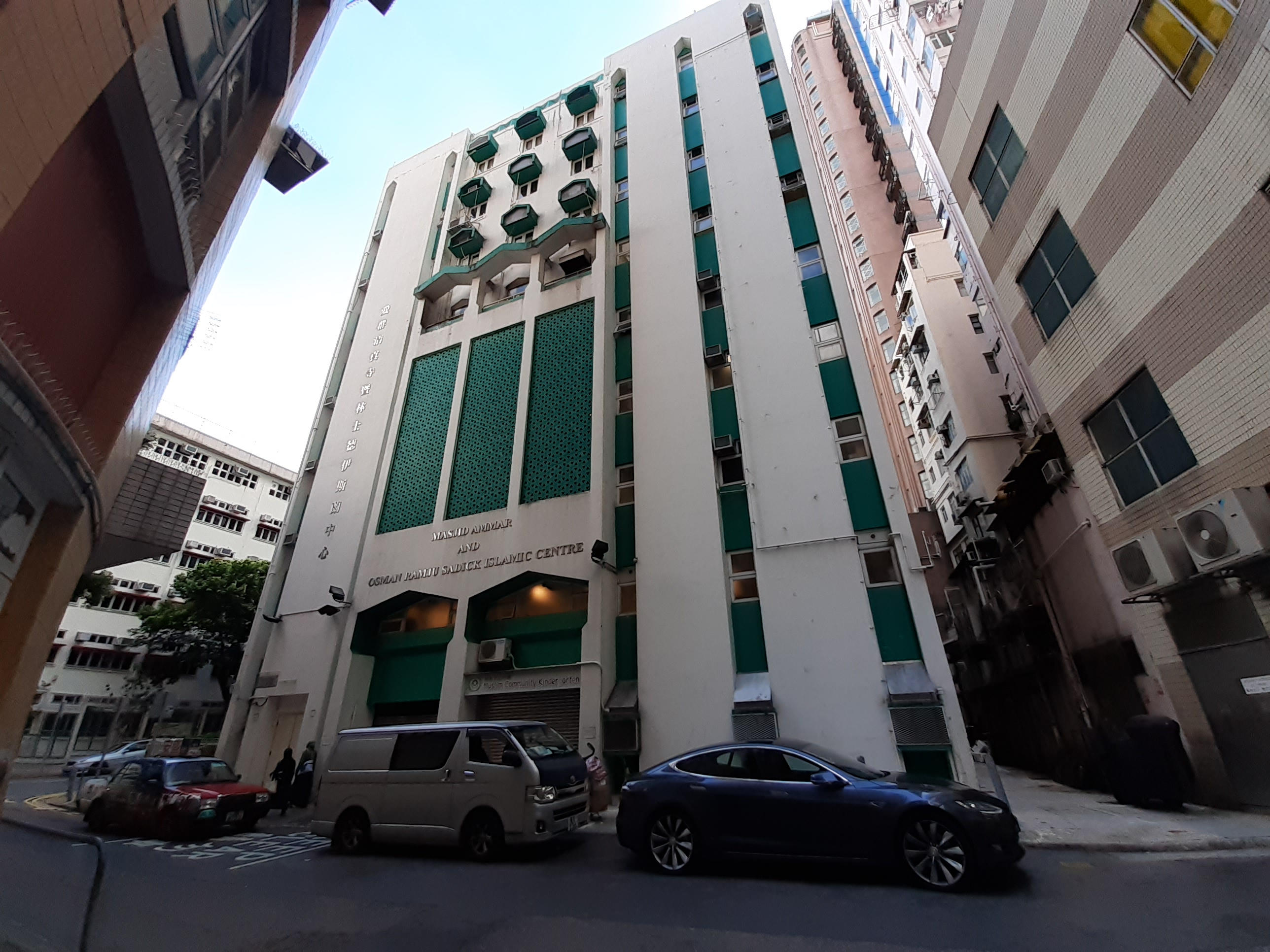
- Formation: 1973
- Headquarters: Ammar Mosque and Osman Ramju Sadick Islamic Centre, Wan Chai, Hong Kong, China
- Region served: Hong Kong
- Chairperson: Syddeqah Yuen
- Website: Official website

Hong Kong Islamic Youth Association
- Traditional Chinese: 香港伊斯蘭青年協會
- Simplified Chinese: 香港伊斯兰青年协会
Transcriptions
Standard Mandarin
- Hanyu Pinyin: Xiānggǎng Yīsīlán Qīngnián Xiéhuì
Yue: Cantonese
- Jyutping: hoeng1 gong2 ji1 si1 laan4 cing1 nin4 hip3 wui6

The Hong Kong Islamic Youth Association (HKIYA; Chinese: 香港伊斯蘭青年協會) is an Islamic association for youths in Hong Kong. The organisation is based at the Ammar Mosque and Osman Ramju Sadick Islamic Centre.

== History ==
The HKIYA was founded in 1973 in British Hong Kong. On 26 May 1999, the association was incorporated as a Limited Company by Guarantee under the Companies Ordinance.

== Organisational structure ==
- Chairman
- Vice-Chairman
- Internal Secretary
- External Secretary
- Treasurer
- Public Relation Officer
- Welfare Officer
- Publication Officer
- Cultural and Educational Officer
- Recreational Officer
- Quarter Master

== See also ==
- Islam in China
- Islam in Hong Kong
