= Stanley Mosque =

Mosque in Stanley, Hong Kong

- 赤柱清真寺
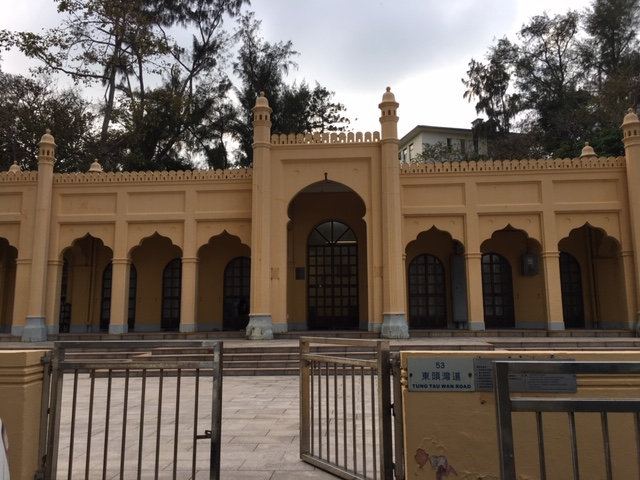
- Stanley Mosque within the same residential community as the prison.

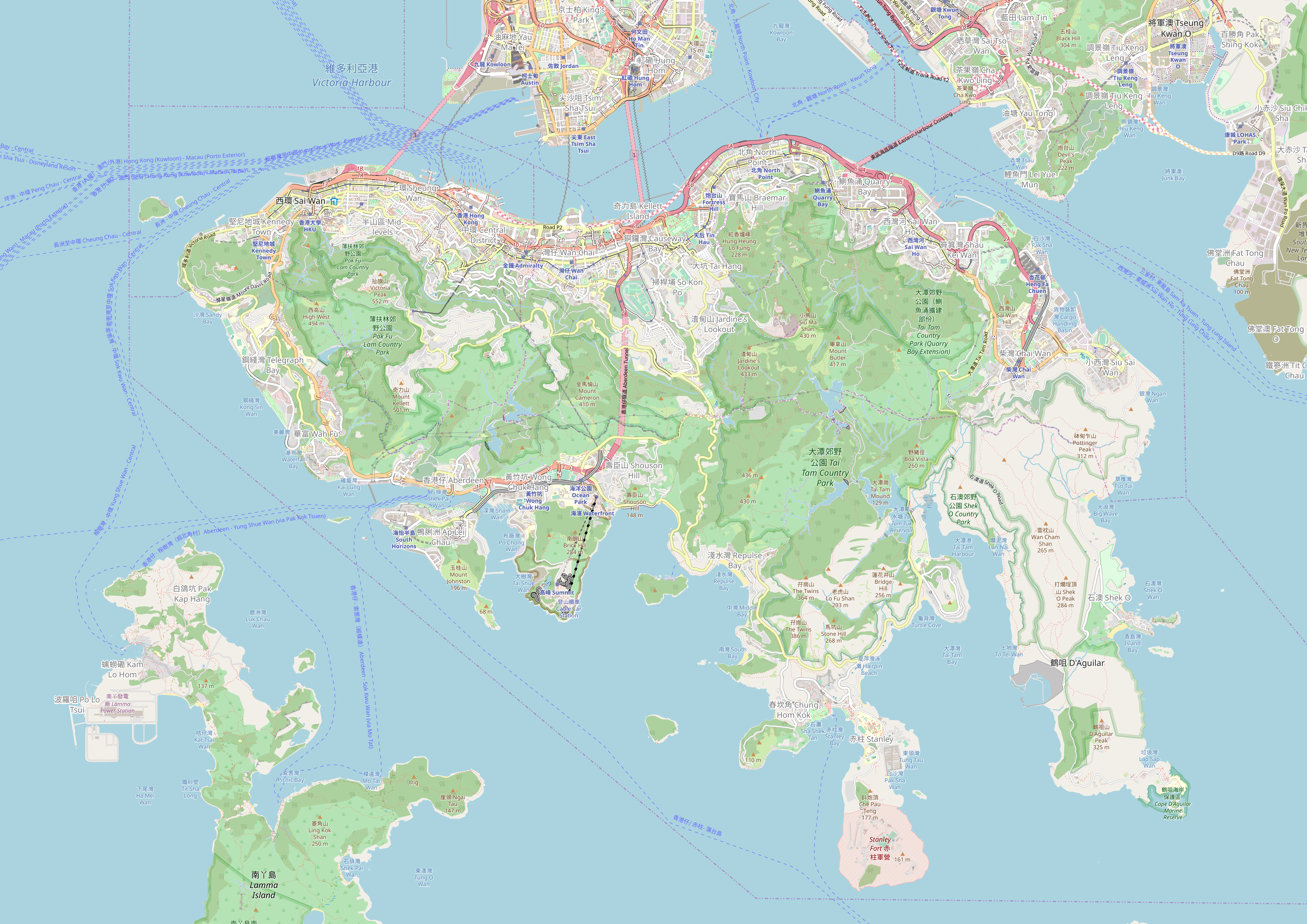
- Location within Hong Kong Island

Religion
- Affiliation: Islam
- Branch/tradition: Sunni

Location
- Location: 53 Tung Tau Wan Road, Stanley, Hong Kong
- Interactive map of Stanley Mosque
- Coordinates: 22°12′54″N 114°13′08″E

Architecture
- Type: mosque
- Completed: 1 January 1937

Stanley Mosque
- Traditional Chinese: 赤柱清真寺
Transcriptions
Yue: Cantonese
- Jyutping: cek3 cyu5 cing1 zan1 zi6

The Stanley Mosque (Chinese: 赤柱清真寺) is a mosque in Stanley, Hong Kong. It is the fourth mosque built in Hong Kong and it is located at the Stanley Prison.

== History ==
In the early 20th century, there were around 400 Muslim employees from India working for the Prison Department of Hong Kong. The headquarters office of the department was initially at Arbuthnot Road. Most of them went to Jamia Mosque to perform their prayer. However, following the relocation of the headquarters from Arbuthnot Road to Stanley Prison, which is much further away, there was a demand to set up a new mosque around the prison area to cater for the welfare and religious needs for the prison Muslim staffs. Thus, Stanley Mosque was opened inside the prison on 1 January 1937.

The Advisory Board of Antiquities and Monuments Office designated the mosque as a Grade I historic building on 18 December 2009.

Due to the safety reasons, the Correctional Services Department staffs limited access to the mosque, however, visitors can enter with an HKID card or state they come to pray.

The Imam of the mosque is Hafiz Afzal Khan, he also teaches Quran in the mosque and leads the prayer. He has been the Imam of the mosque for over 20 years.

== Architecture ==
The sandy coloured mosque has a large prayer hall, veranda and courtyard. A parking area is located in front of the mosque. The mosque is not generally open to the public as it is within the prison grounds.

== Imams ==
| Name | Tenure | Notes |
|---|---|---|
| Hafiz Afzal Khan | 2000 – present | |

== See also ==
- Islam in Hong Kong
- List of mosques in Hong Kong
- List of mosques in China
