= United Muslims Association of Hong Kong =

Religious organization in Hong Kong, China

- 香港穆斯林聯會
- Formation: 1980s
- Founders: Omar Ramju Sadick, Mohammad Alli Din
- Headquarters: Tuen Mun, Hong Kong, China
- Region served: Hong Kong
- Website: Official website

United Muslims Association of Hong Kong
- Traditional Chinese: 香港穆斯林聯會
- Simplified Chinese: 香港穆斯林联会
Transcriptions
Standard Mandarin
- Hanyu Pinyin: Xiānggǎng Mùsīlín Lián Huì
Yue: Cantonese
- Jyutping: hoeng1 gong2 muk6 si1 lam4 lyun4 wui6*2

The United Muslim Association of Hong Kong (UMAH; Chinese: 香港穆斯林聯會) is a registered charity and Islamic organization in Hong Kong established to organize and manage community worship centres i.e. mosques, schools and elderly care homes for the Muslim community in Hong Kong. UMAH has commenced a new project named the Sheung Shui Mosque and Islamic Centre and elderly care home in Sheung Shui.

== History ==
The organisation was established in 1997 by Omar Ramju Sadick.

== Activities ==
It currently operates the UMAH International Primary School in Yen Long and a home for the elderly, Haji Omar Ramju Sadick Care and Attention Home in Tuen Mun. UMAH also manages an ongoing project to establish a new mosque named the Sheung Shui Mosque and Islamic Centre and an elderly care home in Sheung Shui.

== See also ==
- Islam in China
- Islam in Hong Kong
