= Chai Wan Mosque =

Mosque in Chai Wan, Hong Kong, China

- 柴灣清真寺
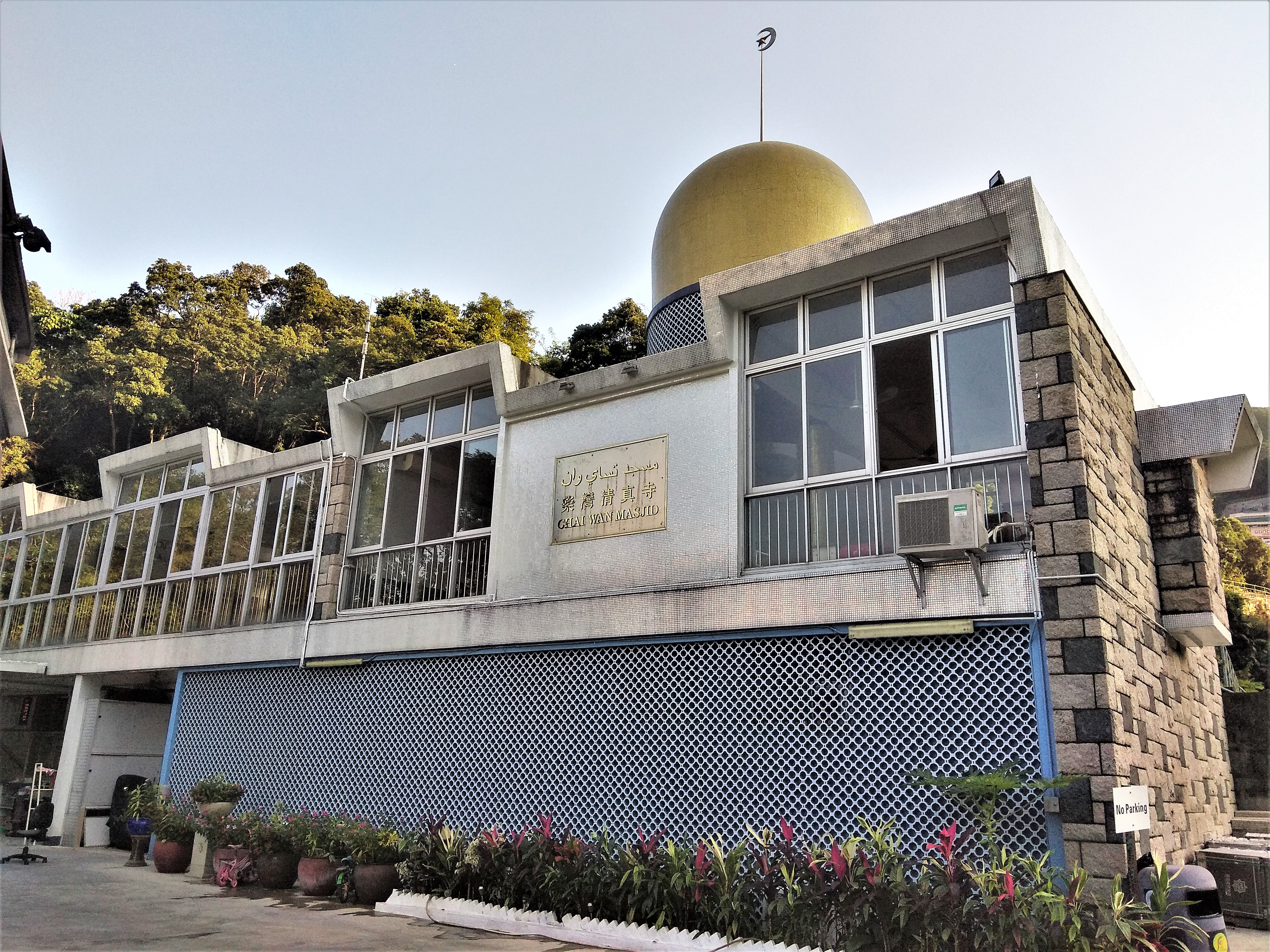

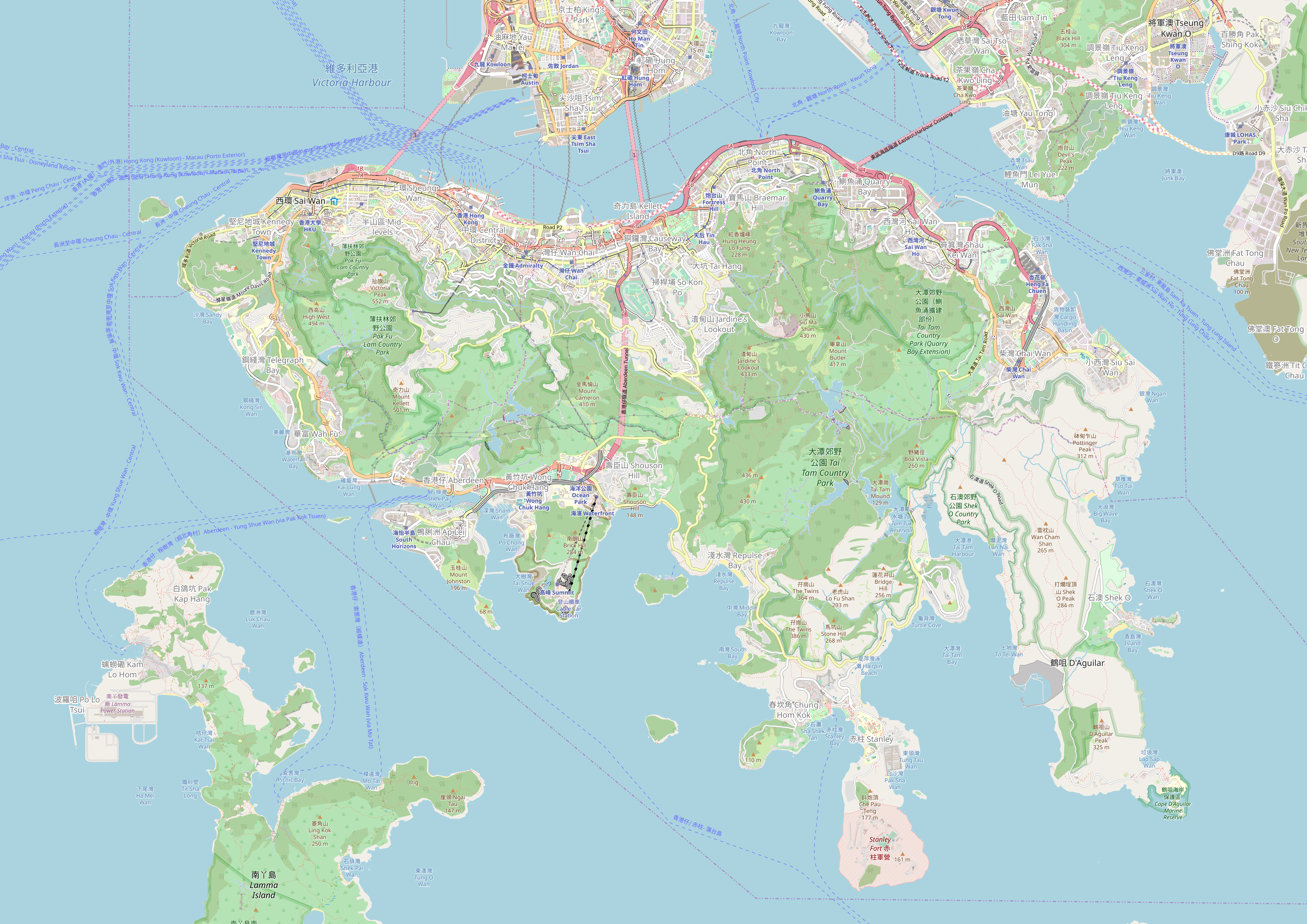
- Location of the mosque on Hong Kong Island

Religion
- Affiliation: Sunni Islam
- Ecclesiastical or organisational status: Mosque
- Status: Active

Location
- Location: Cape Collinson Road, Tai Tam Gap, Chai Wan, Hong Kong
- Country: China
- Interactive map of Chai Wan Mosque
- Coordinates: 22°15′34″N 114°13′59″E

Architecture
- Type: Mosque
- Completed: 1963

Specifications
- Dome: 1
- Materials: White marble

Chai Wan Mosque
- Traditional Chinese: 柴灣清真寺
- Cantonese Yale: chàaih wāan chīng jān jih
Transcriptions
Yue: Cantonese
- Yale Romanization: chàaih wāan chīng jān jih
- Jyutping: caai4 waan1 cing1 zan1 zi6

The Chai Wan Mosque (traditional Chinese: 柴灣清真寺; simplified Chinese: 柴湾清真寺; pinyin: Cháiwān Qīngzhēnsì) or Cape Collinson Mosque is a mosque in Chai Wan, Hong Kong, China. It is the fifth mosque built in Hong Kong.

== History ==
To compensate the resumption of cemetery and a small mosque in Ho Man Tin in 1963, the British Hong Kong government provided a land for cemetery in Cape Collinson and constructed a small mosque called the Chai Wan Mosque which was opened on 4 August 1963 and was primarily used to offer funeral prayer. Initially regular prayers were not held there because the mosque was located in a very isolated area and no Muslims lived there except for a caretaker. However, as more and more Muslim families settled in Chai Wan, they started to perform their daily prayers at the mosque. The Incorporated Trustees of the Islamic Community Fund of Hong Kong had also renovated the entire building in 2005 and air conditioners had been installed in the main prayer hall.

On 17 May 2010, the advisory board of Antiquities and Monuments Office designated the mosque as a Grade III historic building.

== Architecture ==
The mosque main space is mainly devoted to three prayer halls with luxurious white marble finishing. Outside the prayer hall is sahn suitable for small religious gatherings.

== Transportation ==
The mosque is accessible within walking distance South West from Chai Wan station of the MTR.

== See also ==
- Islam in Hong Kong
- List of mosques in Hong Kong
- List of mosques in China
