= Sheung Shui Mosque and Islamic Centre =

Upcoming mosque in North, Hong Kong, China

- 上水清真寺暨伊斯蘭中心
- Location of the mosque in Hong Kong, when complete

Religion
- Affiliation: Sunni Islam (when opened)
- Ecclesiastical or organisational status: Mosque (when complete); Aged care home
- Status: Under construction

Location
- Location: 6 Fung Nam Road, Fanling–Sheung Shui New Town, North District, New Territories, Hong Kong
- Country: China
- Interactive map of Sheung Shui Mosque and Islamic Centre
- Coordinates: 22°30′29.6″N 114°07′39.6″E

Architecture
- Type: Mosque
- Funded by: Kingdom of Saudi Arabia; United Muslims Association of Hong Kong
- Groundbreaking: 2021
- Completed: 2026
- Construction cost: HK$310 million
- Site area: 2,046 m^{2} (22,020 sq ft)

Sheung Shui Mosque and Islamic Centre
- Traditional Chinese: 上水清真寺暨伊斯蘭中心
- Simplified Chinese: 上水清真寺暨伊斯兰中心
Transcriptions
Yue: Cantonese
- Jyutping: soeng6 seoi2 cing1 zan1 zi6 kei3 ji1 si1 laan4 zung1 sam1

The Sheung Shui Mosque and Islamic Centre (Chinese: 上水清真寺暨伊斯蘭中心), also known as the King Abdullah Islamic Centre and Elderly Home, is a proposed mosque and Islamic centre currently under construction in Fanling–Sheung Shui New Town, North District, New Territories, Hong Kong. When completed, it will be the sixth mosque built in Hong Kong and the first one in New Territories. Upon completion, the mosque will be operated by the United Muslims Association of Hong Kong (UMAH).

== History ==
The co-founder and second chair of UMAH, Alli Din, originally offered his own land to the Islamic Board of Trustees (BOT) to be made into a mosque in 1979, which was rejected by the Hong Kong Government. Din applied again from the platform of UMAH in November 1990.

In 2000, UMAH received an offer for the piece of land in Sheung Shui at FSST Lot no. 203 in D.D. 51 and D.D. 52, Fung Nam Road. Following six years of public consultations led by the government, UMAH's ownership of the land was confirmed on 31 March 2006 under a private treaty grant as New Grant No. 20193.

The land premium was set by the Hong Kong Government in 2005 at HK$9.350 million. UMAH argued that, based on their research, the land premium was hyper-inflated, as most other similar projects received land grants at a nominal rate of HK$1,000. This cost was ultimately funded through donations by Muslims in Hong Kong and overseas. The amount paid to the Hong Kong Government February 24, 2006 increased with a HK$500,000 interest charge due to a delayed payment, and the final amount paid was HK$9,941,509.

Following Din's death at the end of 2009, UMAH conducted a re-examination of the organization's role and leadership between 2010 and 2019. During this period, the Incorporated Trustees of Islamic Fund of HK was entrusted to take care of the mosque project, in liaison with the major sponsor, and the Hong Kong government.

In 2017, UMAH led the establishment of the Sheung Shui Mosque and Elderly Care Centre Action Committee, composed of representatives from various Muslim organizations in Hong Kong, which was given executive responsibility for the construction of the Sheng Shui Mosque. The prevailing leadership of UMAH was declared by the Hong Kong courts in 2019.

=== Project support by Saudi Arabia ===
In 2009, UMAH signed a memorandum of agreement with the Kingdom of Saudi Arabia (KSA), which pledged funds for the construction of the Sheng Shui Mosque as stated in the Private Treaty Grant (PTG), including an elderly care centre, a mosque, a residence for the imam, a carpark, canteen, and travelers’ quarters.

The KSA Ministry of Finance released two overseas tender requests from 2010 to 2016, but due to high estimates from contractors they were rejected. In October 2018, the KSA Consulate in Hong Kong confirmed re-commencement of the Sheng Shui Mosque project with a revised budget approval of US$39.4 million and instructed UMAH to proceed with a local tendering exercise. This process received bids within the allocated budget, but the KSA subsequently decided it would re-tender the project. The invitation to tender was issued in December 2019 following meetings between UMAH and the KSA in mid-2019. The KSA's latest tender process was expected to conclude by the end of September 2020 and the main construction to commence by December 2020.

=== Dealings with the Lands Department ===
Rent payments over the land were current until the end of September 2020. A condition of grant over the land was to commence the Sheng Shui Mosque project by 31 March 2011, which, due to the delays ensuing as a result of the restructuring, was extended to 31 December 2019. The Lands Department issued a reminder notice to UMAH to start site formation works before December 2019 in order not to breach the extension.

Due to delays in the tendering process to complete main construction works which were only issued in December 2019, UMAH commenced site formation works (including hoarding works as the first step of site formation works) in parallel with the ongoing tender process.

Despite the difficulties posed by social unrest in Hong Kong throughout 2019 and the lockdown of Hong Kong due to the COVID-19 pandemic throughout 2020, UMAH received approval in June 2020 to begin hoarding works and commenced construction works in August 2020. The funds for the hoarding works were raised by UMAH concurrently with financial support from the Hong Kong Muslim community. In addition, the KSA issued US$100,000 to support the commencement of hoarding works.

On 2 September 2020, the Lands Department visited the project site and ordered immediate cessation of hoarding works. All construction workers were asked to leave the site immediately. The Lands Department issued a Lands Department Memorial of Re-entry on the same day on behalf of the Hong Kong government, stating that the land private treaty grant had been cancelled, and the land had been declared unleased.

== Architecture ==
The area of the plot of land involved for the construction is 2,046 square metres (22,020 sq ft). The overall building comprises six stories, with two of them allocated for Sheung Shui Mosque and the rest for a 200-bed elderly care home.

== See also ==
- Islam in Hong Kong
- List of mosques in Hong Kong
- List of mosques in China
