= Islamic Union of Hong Kong =

Religious organization based in Hong Kong, China

- 香港伊斯蘭聯會
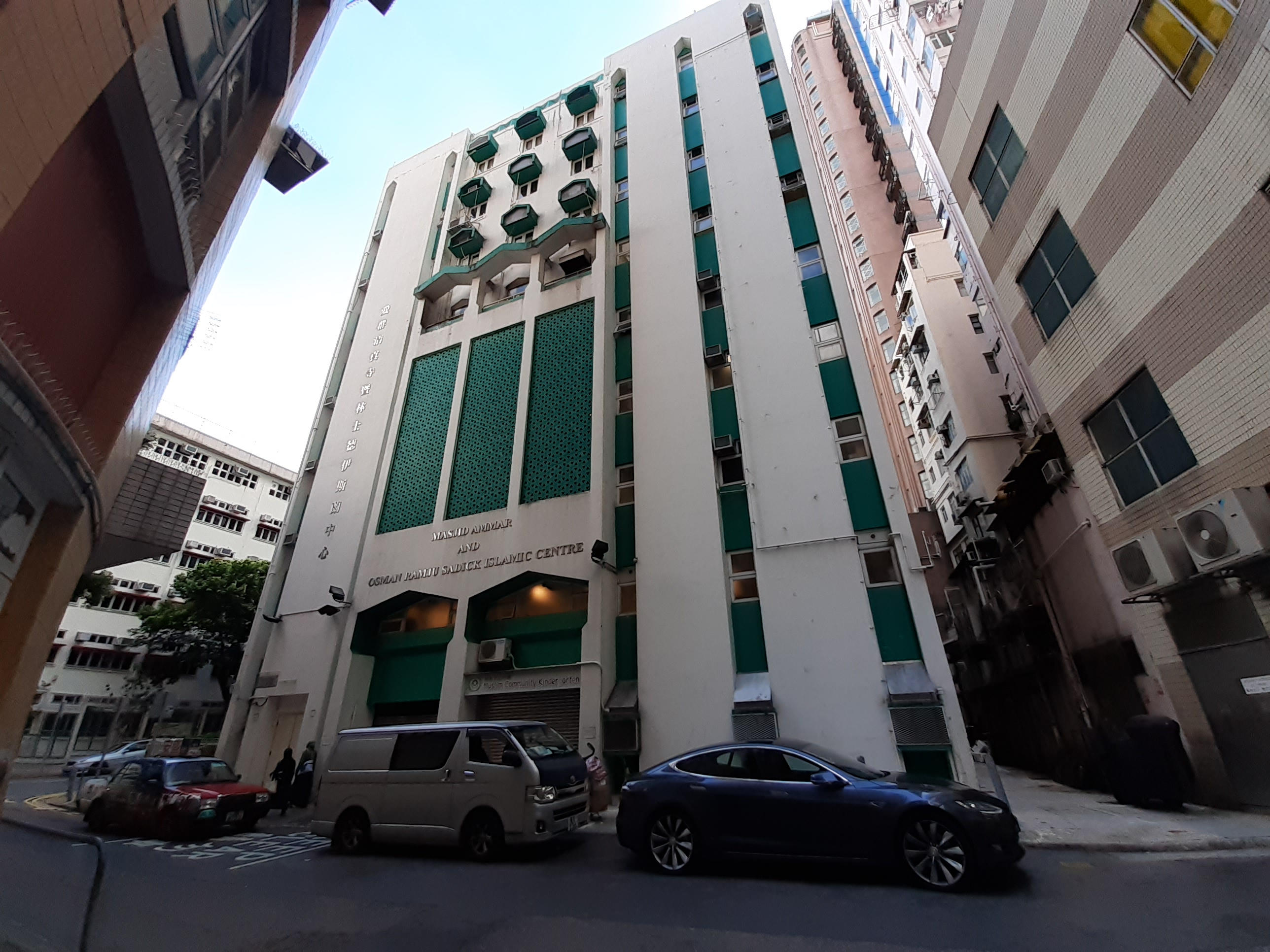
- Headquarters: Ammar Mosque and Osman Ramju Sadick Islamic Centre
- Location: Wan Chai, Hong Kong, China
- Members: 700
- Chairman: A.R. Suffiad
- Website: Official website

Islamic Union of Hong Kong
- Traditional Chinese: 香港伊斯蘭聯會
- Simplified Chinese: 香港伊斯兰联会
Transcriptions
Standard Mandarin
- Hanyu Pinyin: Xiānggǎng Yīsīlán Lián Huì
Yue: Cantonese
- Jyutping: hoeng1 gong2 ji1 si1 laan4 lyun4 wui6

The Islamic Union of Hong Kong is an Islamic charitable and non-profit organisation in Hong Kong, China. The headquarters of the union is at the Ammar Mosque and Osman Ramju Sadick Islamic Centre.

== History ==
The organisation was founded over 110 years ago by Muslims from South Asia and Maritime Southeast Asia who were in British Hong Kong to trade with the Republic of China. In 1980, the constitution of the organisation was revised to fulfill the requirements for incorporation as a legal entity under The Companies Ordinance of the British Hong Kong government.

== Activities ==
The organisation regularly holds various types of classes, such as sewing, dawah, embroidery, handicraft, computer, English language, martial arts, Quran, Adhan etc. in several languages, such as English, Indonesian, Chinese and Filipino.

The organisation also runs a medical clinic, which includes a pharmacy served by volunteer Muslim doctors and nurses. The clinic also arranges body checks and health talks for members and non-members.

== See also ==
- Islam in China
- Islam in Hong Kong
- Incorporated Trustees of the Islamic Community Fund of Hong Kong
