= Ammar Mosque and Osman Ramju Sadick Islamic Centre =

Mosque in Wan Chai, Hong Kong, China

- Chinese: 愛群清真寺林士德伊斯蘭中心
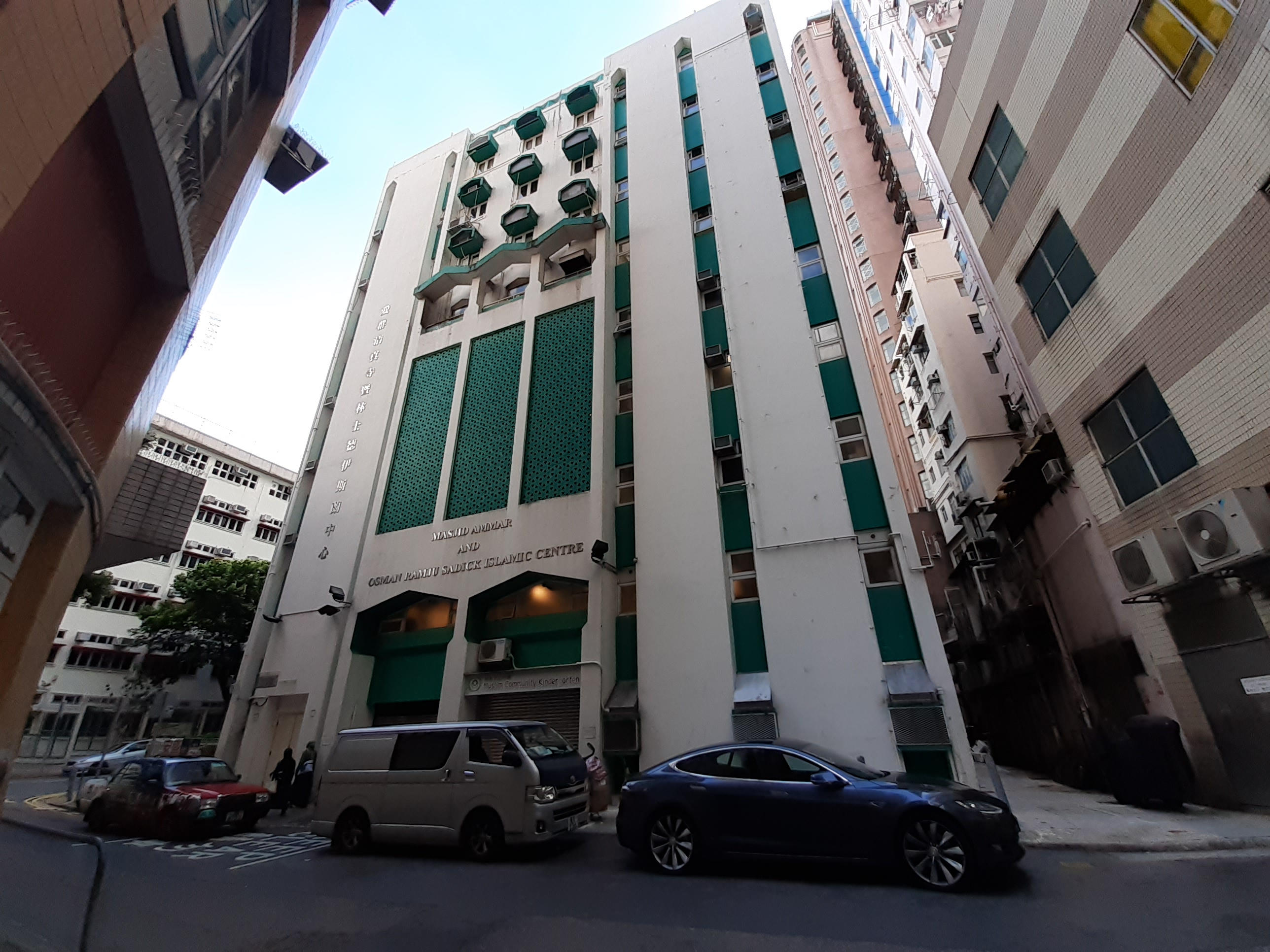

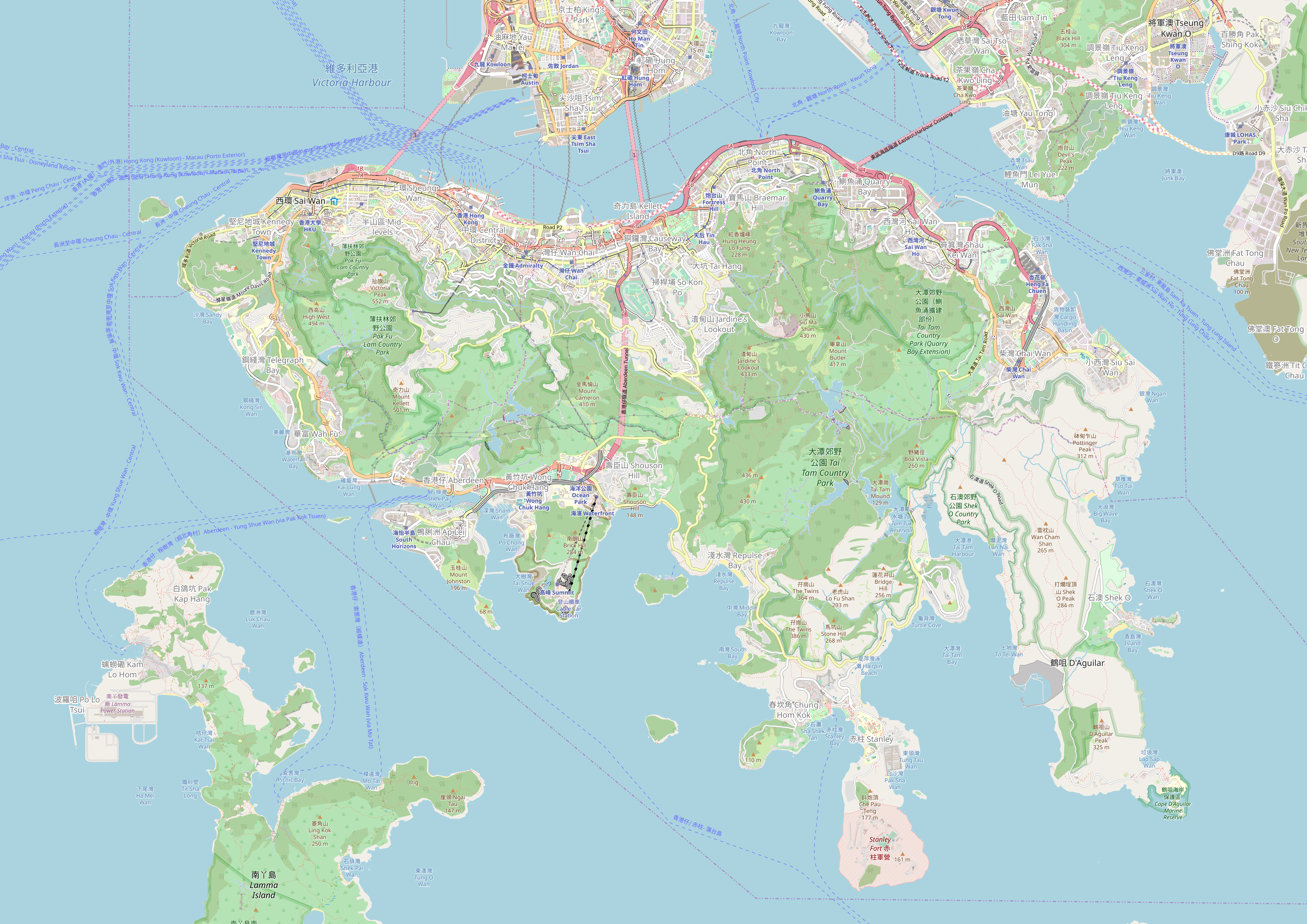
- Location on Hong Kong Island

Religion
- Affiliation: Sunni Islam
- Ecclesiastical or organizational status: Mosque
- Status: Active

Location
- Location: No. 40, Oi Kwan Road, Wan Chai, Hong Kong
- Country: China
- Interactive map of Ammar Mosque and Osman Ramju Sadick Islamic Centre
- Coordinates: 22°16′39″N 114°10′44″E

Architecture
- Architect: Ramju Sadick
- Type: Mosque
- Funded by: Islamic Union of Hong Kong
- Completed: 1967 (original building); 1981 (current building)
- Construction cost: HK$2.5 million
- Capacity: 700 worshippers

Ammar Mosque and Osman Ramju Sadick Islamic Centre
- Traditional Chinese: 愛群清真寺林士德伊斯蘭中心
Transcriptions
Yue: Cantonese
- Jyutping: oi3 kwan4 cing1 zan1 zi6 lam4 si6 dak1 ji1 si1 laan4 zung1 sam1

The Ammar Mosque and Osman Ramju Sadick Islamic Centre (Chinese: 愛群清真寺林士德伊斯蘭中心) or Wan Chai Mosque is a mosque and Islamic centre in Wan Chai, Hong Kong, China. It was the third mosque built in Hong Kong.

== History ==
=== First building ===
The original building of this mosque can be traced back to the first Muslim cemetery in Hong Kong located at 7 Seymore Street where there were only five or six burials took place. By that time, the Ammar Mosque was just a small mosque built adjacent to the cemetery which was used primarily to offer funeral prayer. However, once the Muslim population increased, Muslims living nearby the mosque began to use it for daily prayers as well. The earliest grave can be traced back to the year of 1864. The site is now used as a Jewish synagogue and the Muslim cemetery moved to Happy Valley Muslim Cemetery.

=== Second building ===
After World War II, the new Ammar Mosque was constructed. In December 1978, the land in which the mosque was built was requisitioned by the British Hong Kong government for the construction of the Aberdeen Tunnel. The government offered them a new plot of land in the current location of Ammar Mosque at the Oi Kwan Road in Wan Chai and paid HK$2.5 million towards the re-provisioning for the new mosque.

=== Current building ===
The construction of the current mosque building started in September 1979 with funds from the Islamic Union of Hong Kong and was formally opened on 14 September 1981. In 2012, major renovations that included the installation of new central air conditioning system, CCTV, new outer painting colour, replacement of toilet and ablution areas, new study rooms, etc. were completed at the cost of HK$14 million, and that took six months.

== Architecture ==
The mosque was designed by a Chinese Muslim, Ramju Sadick. The centre of the mosque is an eight-storey complex with multi-purpose facilities, such as wadu halls for men and women on the first floor, mosque male prayer hall on the second floor, mosque female prayer hall on the third floor and Chinese restaurant, Halal bakery, medical services, classrooms, library, offices for Imam and Quran teachers, conference and seminar rooms are located on the fourth until eighth floors.

== Activities ==
Ammar mosque houses the headquarters of Incorporated Trustees of the Islamic Community Fund of Hong Kong and Hong Kong Islamic Youth Association. The mosque holds Islamic workshops every weekend. It also holds classes for new converts to Islam and proper Quran reading. Occasionally, the mosque hosts tour visits by school or university students on organised field trips.

== Transport ==
The building is accessible east from Wan Chai station and also west from Causeway Bay station.

== See also ==
- Islam in Hong Kong
- List of mosques in Hong Kong
- List of mosques in China
