= Islam in Hong Kong =

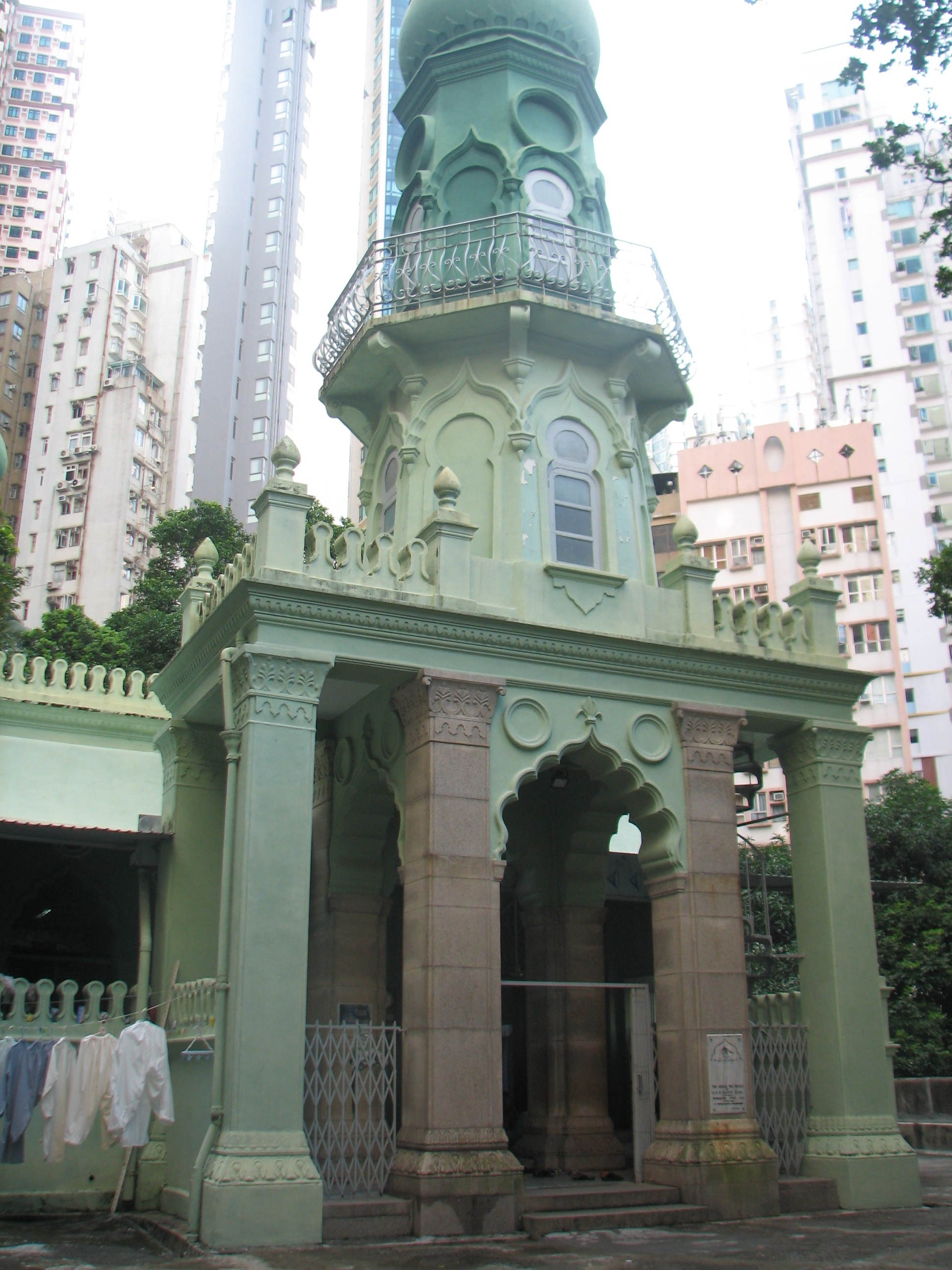
Jamia Mosque, the first mosque in Hong Kong

According to the 2016 census, Islam is practised by 4.1% of the population of Hong Kong, or about 300,000 Muslims. Of this number, 50,000 are Chinese, 150,000 are Indonesians and 30,000 are Pakistanis, with the rest from other parts of the world. The vast majority of Muslims in Hong Kong are Sunni.

About 12,000 of the Muslim families in Hong Kong are "local boy" families, Muslims of mixed Chinese and South Asian ancestry descended from early Muslim South Asian immigrants who took local Chinese wives (Tanka people) and brought their children up as Muslims. Hui Muslims from mainland China also played a role in the development of Islam in Hong Kong, such as Kasim Tuet from Guangzhou, one of the pioneers of Muslim education in the city, for whom the Islamic Kasim Tuet Memorial College is named.

In the new millennium, the largest number of Muslims in the territory are Indonesian, most of whom are female foreign domestic workers. They account for over 120,000 of Hong Kong's Muslims.

== History ==
The history of Muslims in Hong Kong began during the British colonial period. The first Muslim settlers in Hong Kong were of Indian origin, in which some of them were soldiers. Starting from the mid 19th century, more and more soldiers and businessmen arrived in Hong Kong from South Asia and mainland China. As the number of them increased, the British Hong Kong government allocated land for them to build their communities and facilities, such as mosques and cemeteries. The British government respected the rights of those Muslim communities by giving them aid.

Chinese Muslims first arrived in Hong Kong in the late 19th and early 20th century, coming from southern Chinese coastal areas, where they had lived for centuries prior. They established their community around Wan Chai District (location of the Wan Chai Mosque). Later Chinese Muslim influxes occurred following episodes of unrest on the mainland. Some Chinese are also more recent converts to Islam. As of 2004, the Chinese Muslims account for over 50% of the Muslim resident population of Hong Kong, and they play an important role in the Islamic organisations of Hong Kong. Hong Kong's Muslims have historically been treated as separate to Chinese Muslims in terms of Hajj arrangements.

== Contemporary Islam ==
=== Food ===
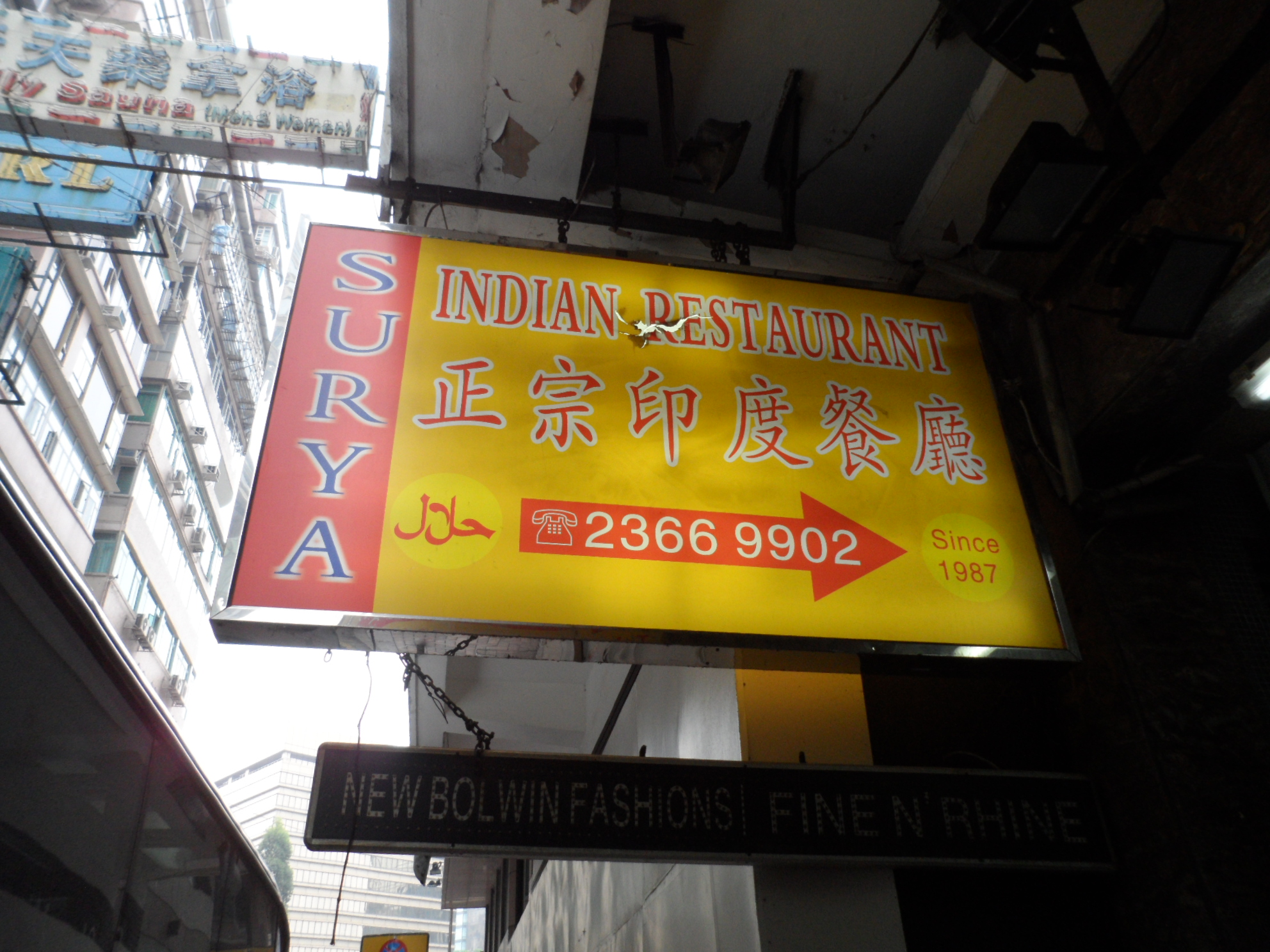
Hong Kong Halal restaurant

Over the past few years, there has been an increasing number of Halal restaurants to cater for Muslim dietary needs, as well as supermarkets selling more and more Halal products. In 2010, there were only 14 Halal restaurants, but after a year the number had jumped three times. As of May 2018, there are 70 Halal-certified restaurants in the region. In January 2025, there were 142 halal certified restaurants in Hong Kong, with the Incorporated Trustees of the Islamic Community Fund (ITICF) intending to certify 500 by the end of the year to better improve tourism from Muslim majority countries.

=== Finance ===
HSBC has plans to implement the Islamic finance system in Hong Kong, although they have yet to be realised. In 2007, the HK Islamic Index was established by Arab Chamber of Commerce and Industry in Hong Kong to support Hong Kong's ambitions to develop into an Islamic financial centre. In the same year, Financial Secretary John Tsang announced a plan to capture part of the global Islamic financial market, which is worth around US$1.3 trillion. Hang Seng Bank issued a retail Islamic fund in November 2007.

=== Education ===
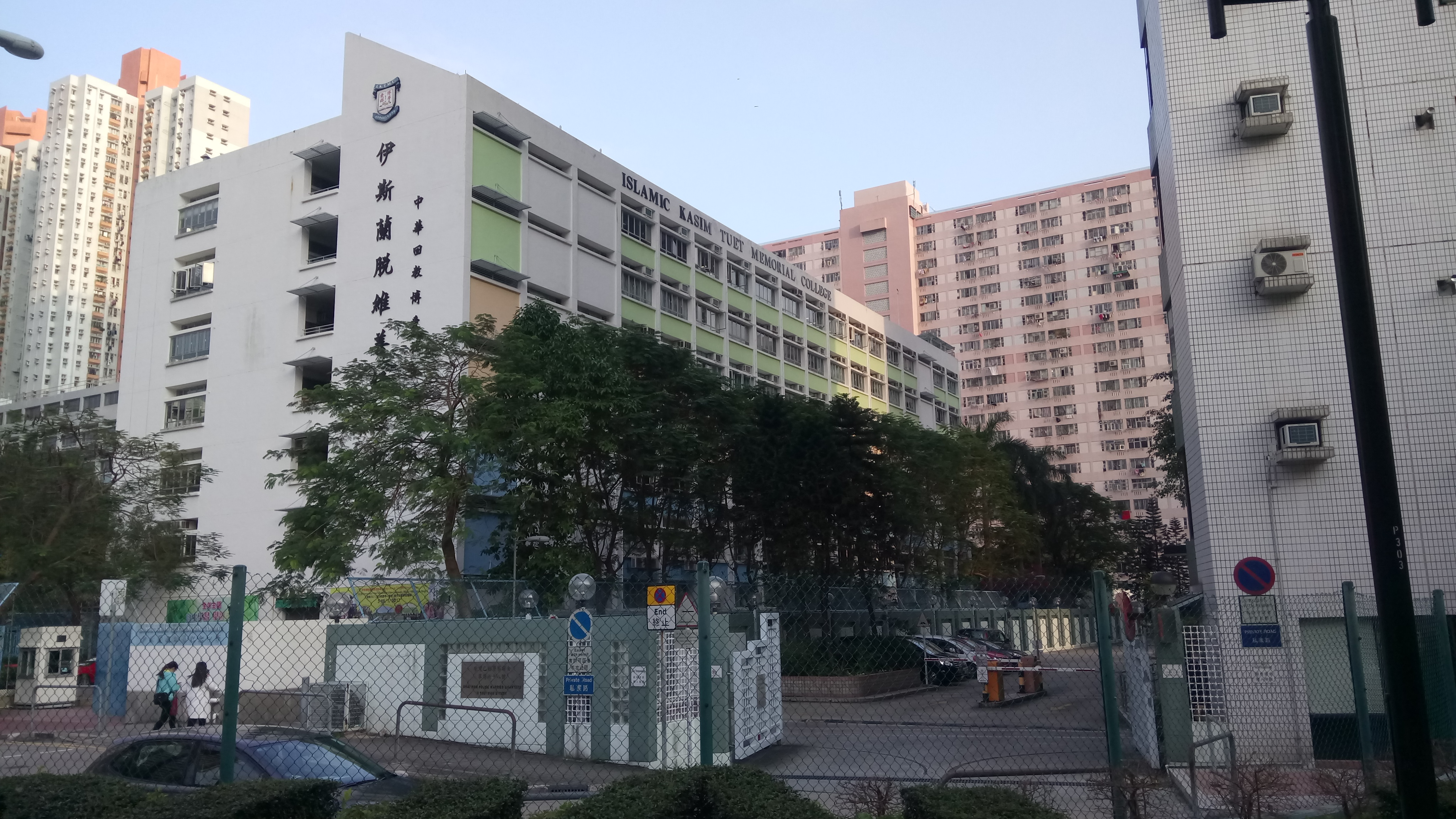
Islamic Kasim Tuet Memorial College

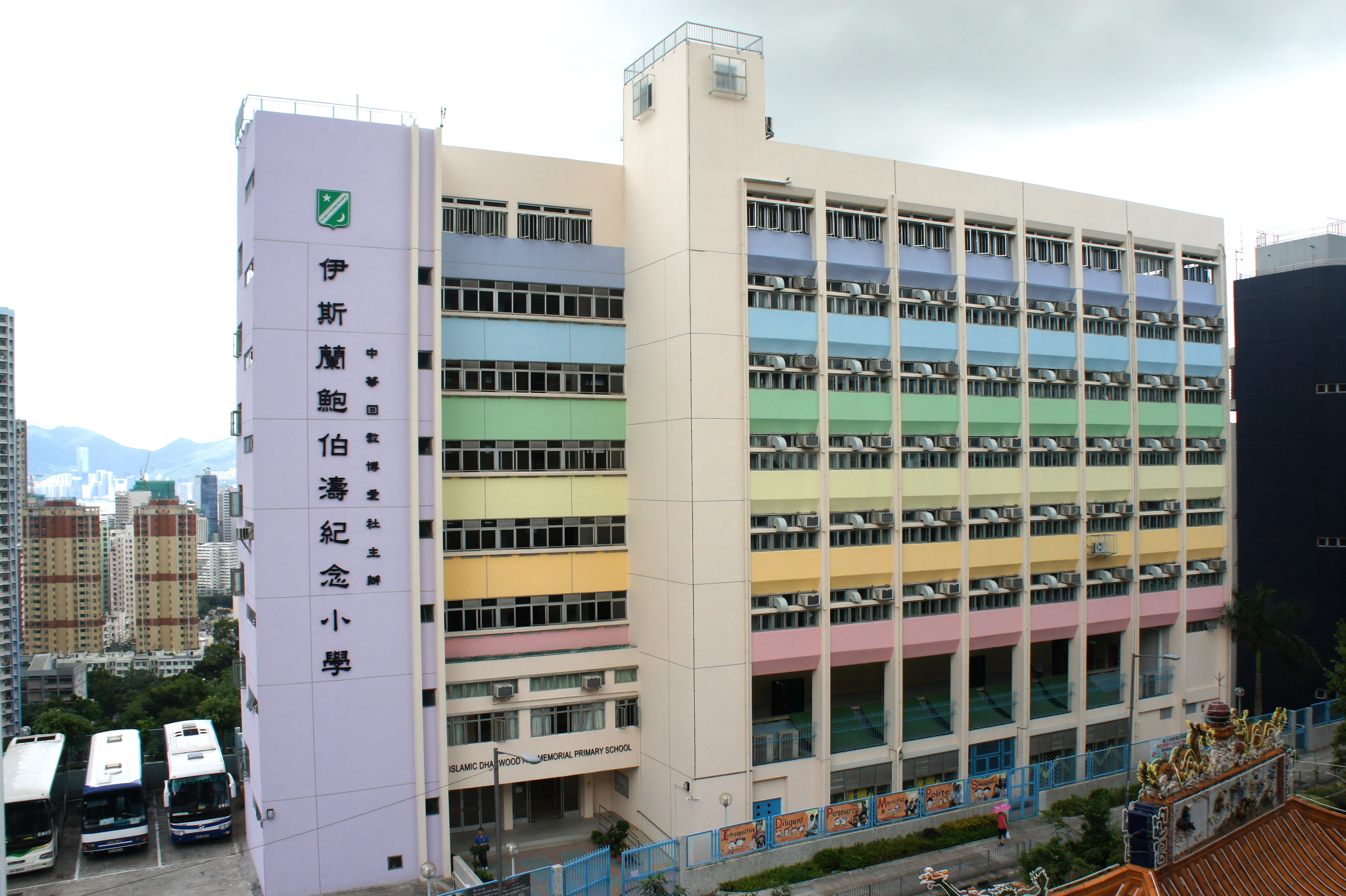
Islamic Dharwood Pau Memorial Primary School

As of January 2010, Hong Kong has 5 Islamic schools, scattered around Hong Kong Island, Kowloon and New Territories. The development of those schools have been remarkably fast, which ranges from kindergartens, primary schools and colleges.

Some of the Islamic educational institutes include:

- Islamic Kasim Tuet Memorial College in Chai Wan, Hong Kong Island
- Islamic Dharwood Pau Memorial Primary School (伊斯蘭鮑伯濤紀念小學) in Tsz Wan Shan, Kowloon
- Islamic Primary School (伊斯蘭學校) in Tuen Mun, New Territories
- UMAH International Primary School in Yuen Long
- Islamic Abu Bakar Chui Memorial Kindergarten in Shau Kei Wan
- Islamic Pok Oi Kindergarten in Tsing Yi
- Muslim Community Kindergarten in Wan Chai

There are also various madrasas throughout the region.

=== Tourism ===
In 2018, Hong Kong made a partnership with the online travel platform Have Halal, Will Travel (HHWT) to showcase the Muslim-friendly side of the region. The government of Hong Kong has been placing increased importance on halal certification to boost tourism, and in 2024 was awarded "Most Promising Muslim-Friendly Tourism Destination of the Year.” by the Global Muslim Travel Index.

=== Pilgrimage ===
Historically, few Muslims performed the Hajj from Hong Kong. Those who did wish to perform the pilgrimage would join Hajj groups from Malaysia, the Indian subcontinent, or mainland China. Since the 1990s, larger numbers of Muslims travel to Mecca directly from Hong Kong and the territory has its own small Hajj quota with Hajj visas awarded from the Saudi Embassy. PRC Muslims are not allowed to travel to Hong Kong for Hajj arrangements but Muslim foreign nationals living in China must make arrangements to travel either from their home country, or through Hong Kong.

=== Social challenges ===
Due to the limited lunch break time on Friday for working-class people in Hong Kong, Friday prayers are often held in a relatively short time. Muslims may also find difficulties in finding suitable place to pray at work or in school. Due to the absence of mosques in New Territories, Muslims living there may find it hard to go to Hong Kong's current six mosques due to their location in Kowloon or Hong Kong Island. Some of them rent flats and turn them into prayer rooms to serve Muslims living around the area. There are currently eight flats in Hong Kong which have been turned into prayer rooms.

== Mosques ==
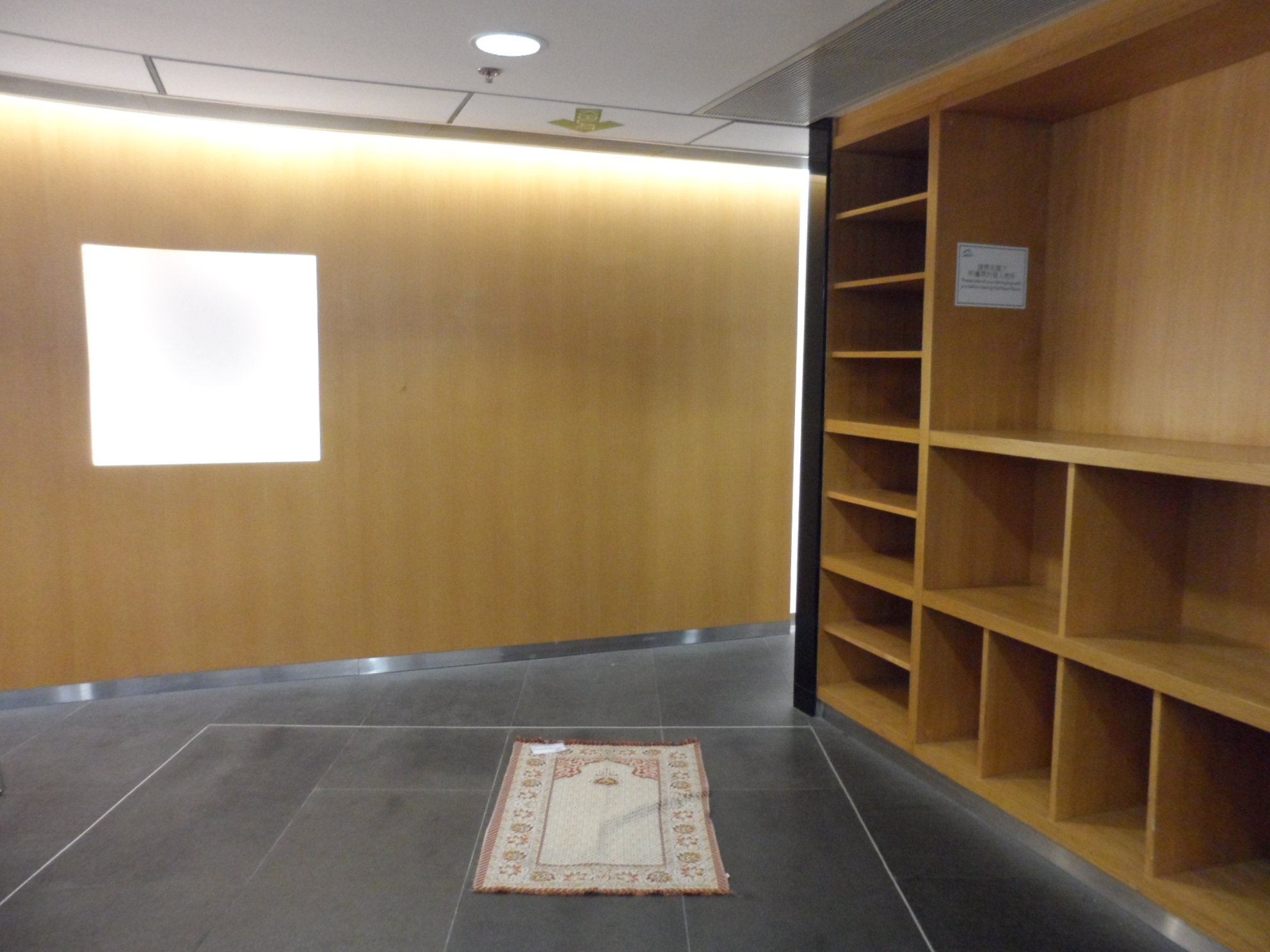
Muslim prayer section of multifaith prayer room at Hong Kong International Airport

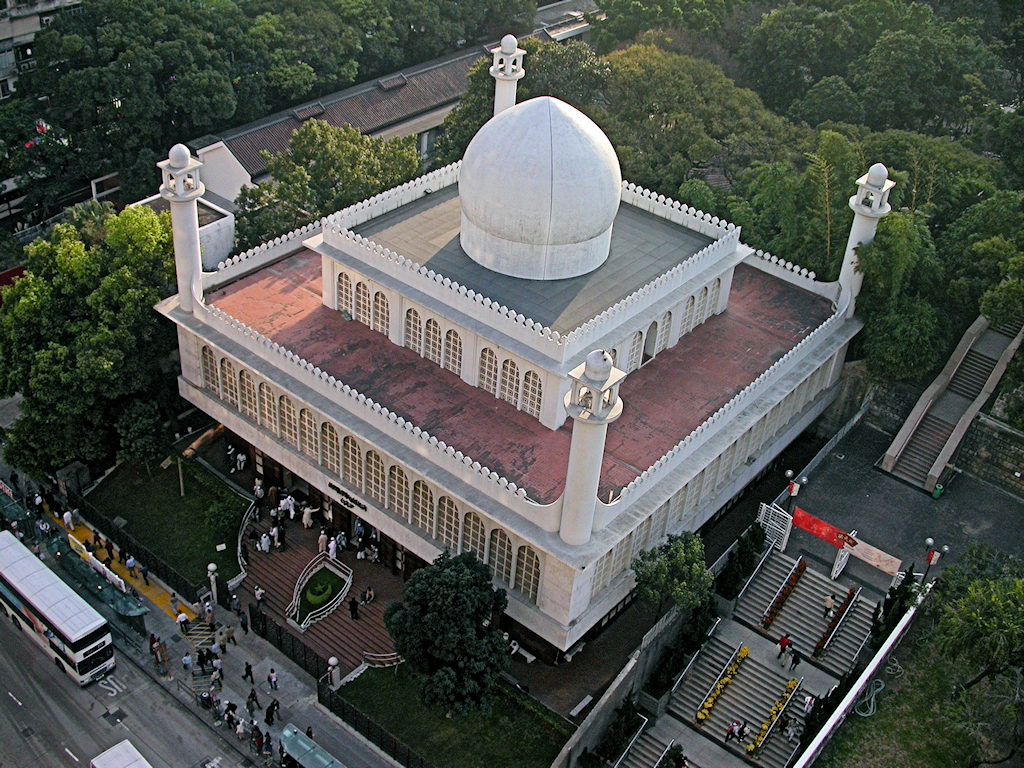
Kowloon Mosque, the largest mosque in Hong Kong

There are currently six principal mosques in Hong Kong that are used daily for prayers. Hong Kong's 7th mosque, the Sheung Shui Mosque is currently under development in New Territories.

=== Jamia Mosque ===
The oldest is the Jamia Mosque on Hong Kong Island, which was built in the 1840s and rebuilt in 1915. The first Imam was Al Haaj Abdul Habib Syed Mohammed Noor Shah, from 1914 to 1946. He travelled to Hong Kong with the British Army. He may also be the first Imam in the British Army.

Syed Mohammed Noor Shah had five sons (Syed Khalil Ullah Shah, Syed Ameen Ullah Shah, Syed Mohammad Rehmat Ullah Shah & Syed Hafiz Ullah Shah) and one daughter, Syeda Fatima who died in her childhood years. His oldest son, Syed Habib Ullah Shah was born in Hong Kong in 1933, January 13. He currently lives in London since 2001, with his youngest son, Sayid Mohammad Asif Ullah Shah.

=== Kowloon Mosque ===
The Kowloon Mosque in Nathan Road, opened in 1984, can accommodate about 3,500 worshipers. It is the largest mosque in Hong Kong.

=== Ammar Mosque ===
The Ammar Mosque at Oi Kwan Road in Wan Chai was opened in September 1981 and can accommodate a congregation of 700 to 1,500 people, depending on the requirements.

=== Chai Wan Mosque ===
Chai Wan Mosque is located at the Cape Collinson Muslim Cemetery.

=== Stanley Mosque ===
Stanley Mosque is located in Stanley Prison.

=== Ibrahim Mosque ===
Ibrahim Mosque was originally located in Yau Ma Tei, and was opened in November 2013. By January 2020, it had been moved to Mong Kok.

Beside mosques, there are many Muslim prayer halls scattered around Hong Kong, such as in Hong Kong International Airport, City University of Hong Kong etc.

== Organisations ==
=== Incorporated Trustees of the Islamic Community Fund of Hong Kong ===
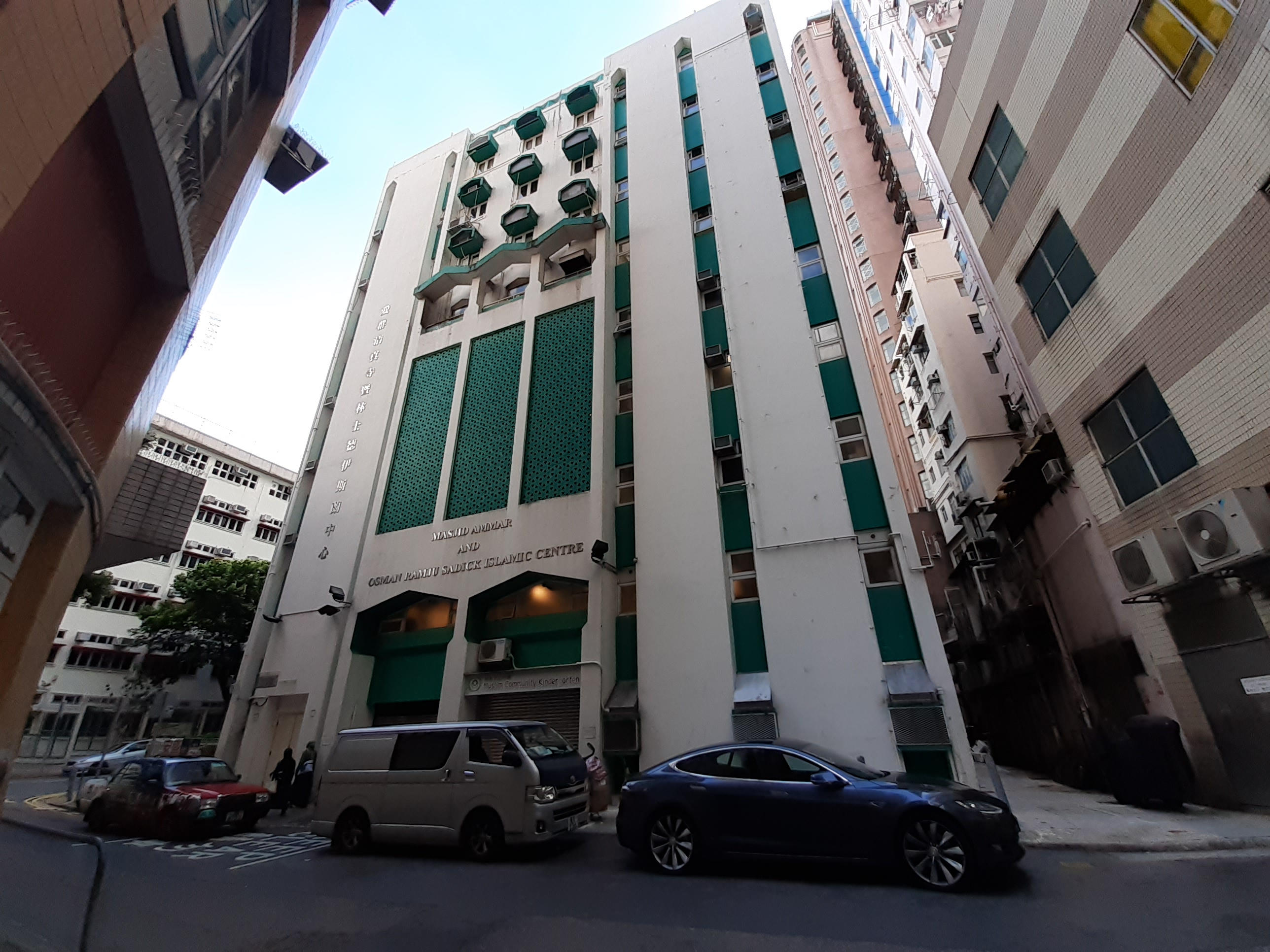
Incorporated Trustees of the Islamic Community Fund of Hong Kong headquarter at Ammar Mosque

The Incorporated Trustees of the Islamic Community Fund of Hong Kong (Chinese: 香港回教信託基金總會) co-ordinates religious affairs and manages mosques and Muslim cemeteries in Hong Kong. The constituent bodies of the trustees are the Islamic Union of Hong Kong, the Pakistan Association of Hong Kong, the Indian Muslim Association of Hong Kong and the Hong Kong Dawoodi Bohra Association. Charitable work among the Muslim community, including financial aid to the needy, medical care, educational assistance, the provision of an Islamic kindergarten and assistance for the aged, is conducted through various Muslim organisations in Hong Kong. The organisation is based at the Ammar Mosque.

=== Islamic Union of Hong Kong ===
The Islamic Union of Hong Kong (Chinese: 香港伊斯蘭聯會) is an Islamic charitable and non-profit organisation in Hong Kong. The headquarters of the union is at the Ammar Mosque.

=== Islamic Cultural Association (Hong Kong) ===
The Islamic Cultural Association (Hong Kong) (ICA; Chinese: 香港伊斯蘭文化協會; pinyin: Xiānggǎng Yīsīlán Wénhuà Xiéhuì; Cantonese Yale: Hēunggóng Yīsīlàahn Màhnfa Hihpwuih) was formed in 2004 and became a government-approved charitable institution. The association is devoted to the promotion of Islamic culture with Quran and Sunnah as its core. To promote exchanges between Islamic culture and other cultures. To enhance research & development of Islamic education and Islamic culture. In 2009, they co-organised the International Conference on Transmission of Islamic Culture and Education in China 「中國伊斯蘭文化與教育的傳承」國際研討會 in co-operation with the centre for the Study of Religion and Chinese Society of the Chinese University of Hong Kong's Chung Chi College. ICA's major scope of work includes academic research, education, culture and charity. Since 2009, the ICA has participated the Hong Kong Book Fair organised by the Hong Kong Trade Development Council, one of Asia's largest book fair.

=== Hong Kong Islamic Youth Association ===
The Hong Kong Islamic Youth Association (HKIYA; Chinese: 香港伊斯蘭青年協會) is a charitable organisation founded in 1973. It has been organising recreational and educational activities for local Muslim youth. The association started the Online Video Channel (OVC) on its YouTube channel (HKIYA1973) in 2012 which provides Da'wah (Islamic preaching) programs in Cantonese updated every week. The first locally developed smart phone App – "IslamHK" was launched on 21 August 2012 by HKIYA and this marked the milestone of modern Islamic preaching. The association is also based at the Ammar Mosque.

=== IFSA ===
The IFSA is the first to organise Quranic competitions between Hong Kong boys and girls, and raise Quranic awareness among Muslim youth as well as the whole community.

=== United Welfare Union Hong Kong Limited ===
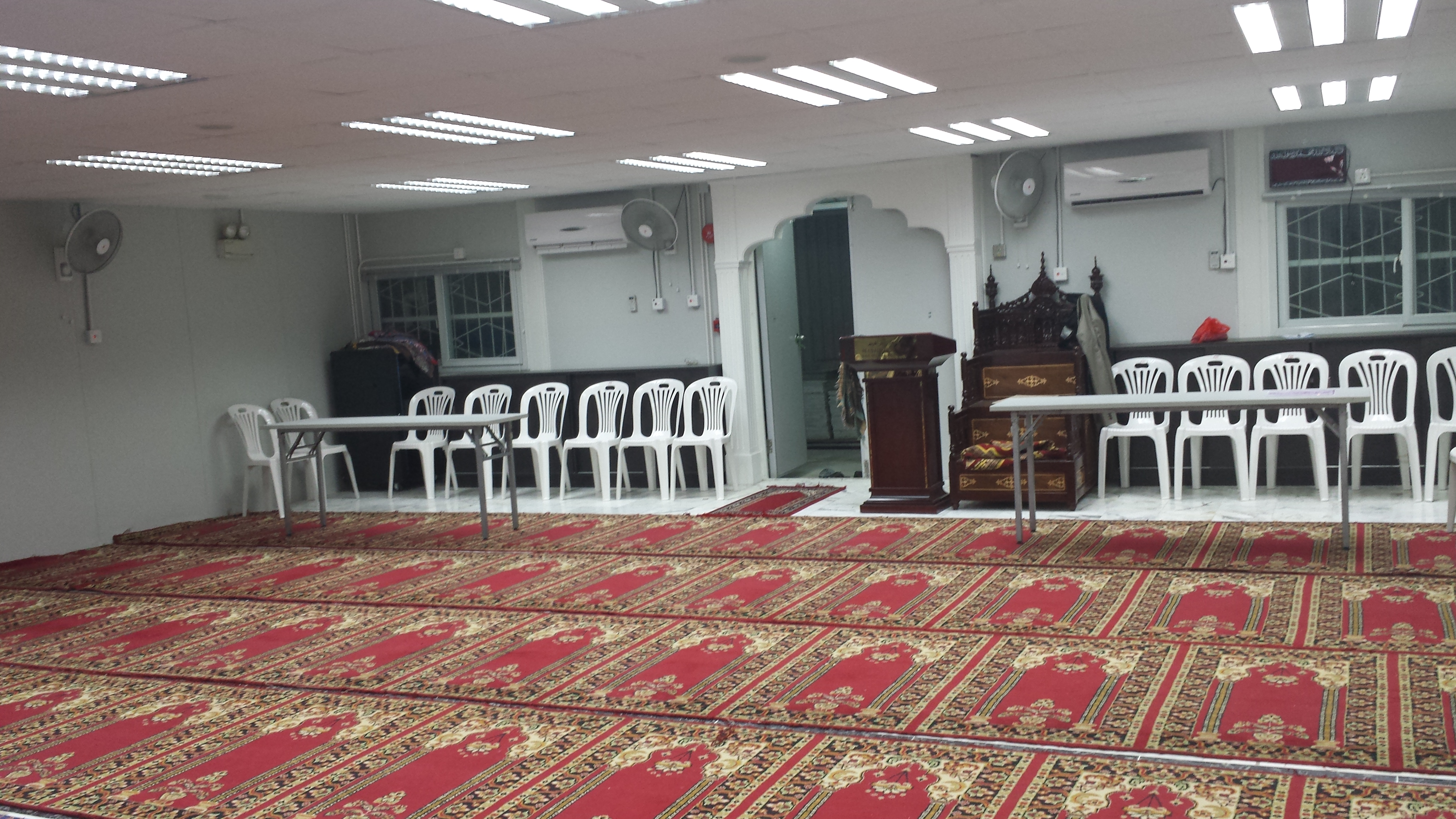
Ibrahim Mosque

United Welfare Union Hong Kong Limited manages the Ibrahim Mosque in Mong Kok and two other centres at present. Based in Hong Kong and are registered as Charitable Organization by the Hong Kong Government since 2002, the organisation offers a variety of services. These include religious services, youth services, community support programmes, and many more.

=== Others ===
- Chinese Muslim Cultural and Fraternal Association
- International Islamic Society, Hong Kong
- Hong Kong Chinese Islamic Federation
- Hong Kong Muslim Women Association
- International Islamic Society
- Khatme-Nubuwwat Movement Hong Kong
- Pakistan Welfare Islamic Union of Hong Kong
- Pakistan Traders Association (Hong Kong)
- Pakistani Students Association Hong Kong
- United Muslims Association of Hong Kong

== Muslim cemeteries ==
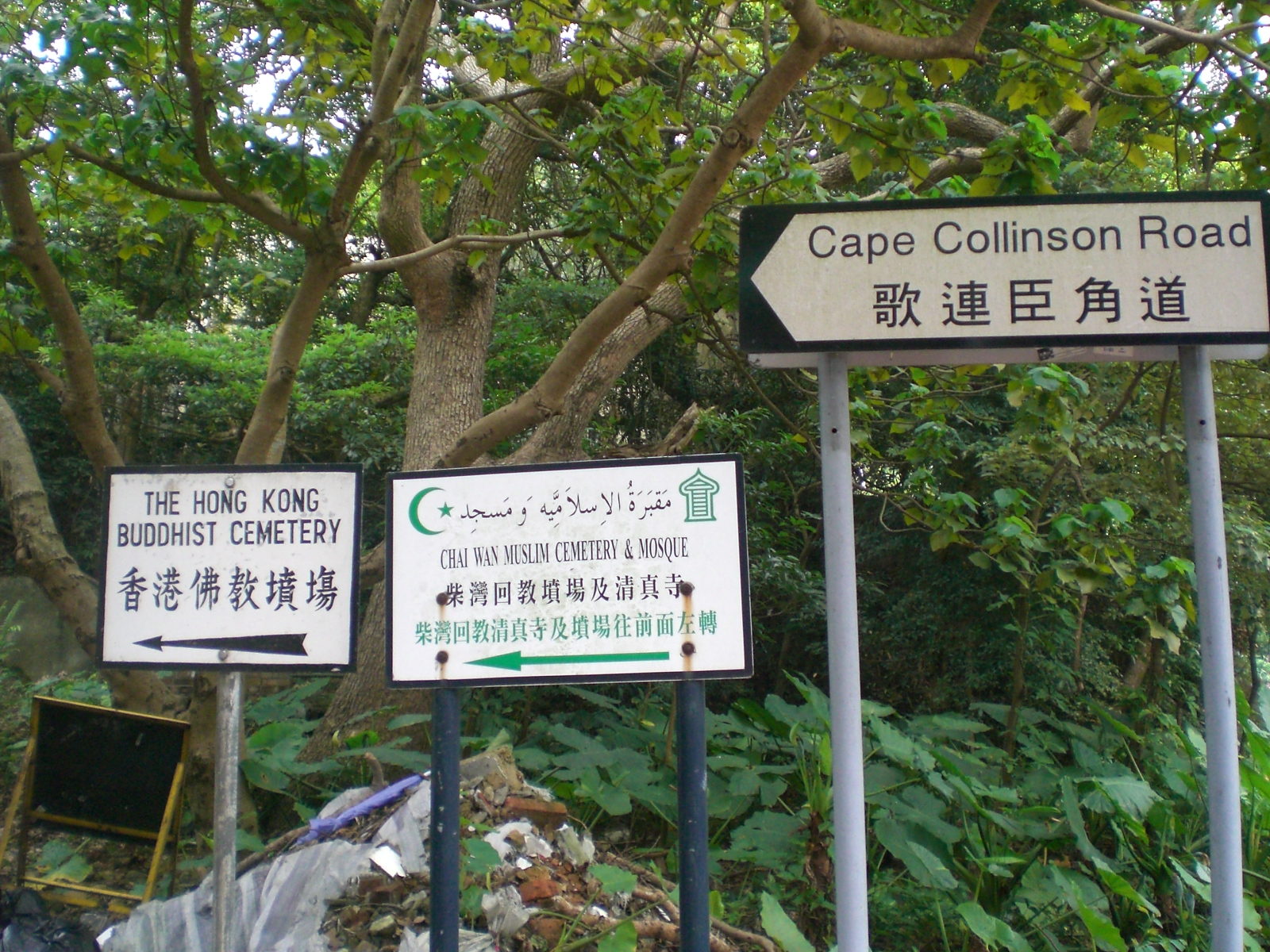
Sign to Chai Wan Muslim Cemetery

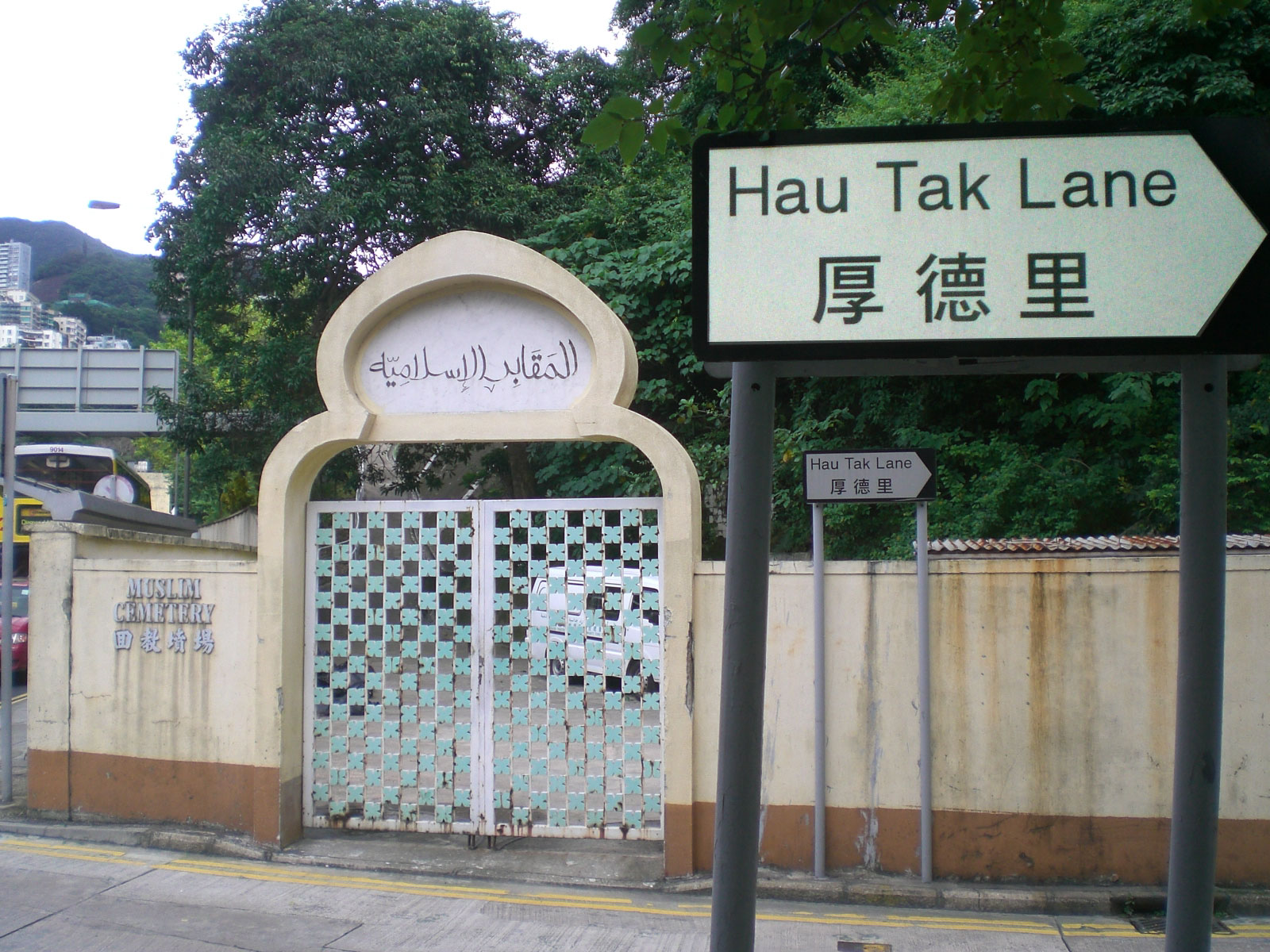
Happy Valley Muslim Cemetery

There are two Muslim cemeteries in Hong Kong which are managed by Incorporated Trustees of the Islamic Community Fund of Hong Kong, which are:

=== Chai Wan Muslim Cemetery ===
The Chai Wan Muslim Cemetery or Cape Collinson Muslim Cemetery (Chinese: 歌連臣角回教墳場) is located in Cape Collinson, Chai Wan. The cemetery was established in 1963 with its distinctive features of its lush green mountains in its surroundings and the Chai Wan Mosque. The maintenance cost of the cemetery is borne by the trustees through burial fees. The maintenance works consist of cleaning and safeguarding the pathways, repairing and maintaining the cemetery slope and clearing natural vegetation when required. On 17 May 2010, the advisory board of Antiques and Monuments Office designated the cemetery as Grade 3 historic building.

=== Happy Valley Muslim Cemetery ===
The Happy Valley Muslim Cemetery is located in Happy Valley. According to the official data in the Food and Environmental Hygiene Department, the first burial at the cemetery was done in 1828. On 15 July 1870, a deed of appropriation was issued by the British Hong Kong government for the area around the present-day Happy Valley Muslim Cemetery to be used as burial ground for Muslims.

== Notable people ==
1. Maulana Qari Muhammad Tayaib Qasmi, an Islamic scholar who has lived in Hong Kong since 1989, served as a Chief Imam and Khatib of Kowloon Mosque. He is currently running seven large Islamic Centres throughout Hong Kong, under the name of Khatme Nubuwwat Islamic Council, giving free after-school Quranic education to over 1,500 students, including adult students and young boys and girls, who study full-time in local schools in Hong Kong.
2. Mufti Muhammad Arshad, the current Chief Imam of the Kowloon Mosque and Hong Kong since 2001, has played a key role in fulfilling the needs of the Muslims in Hong Kong and has great influence among them.

== See also ==
- List of mosques in Hong Kong
- Islam in Macau
- Islam in Sichuan
- Islam in Taiwan
- Islam in Tibet
