= Ibrahim Mosque =

Mosque in Mong Kok, Hong Kong, China

- 易卜拉欣清真寺
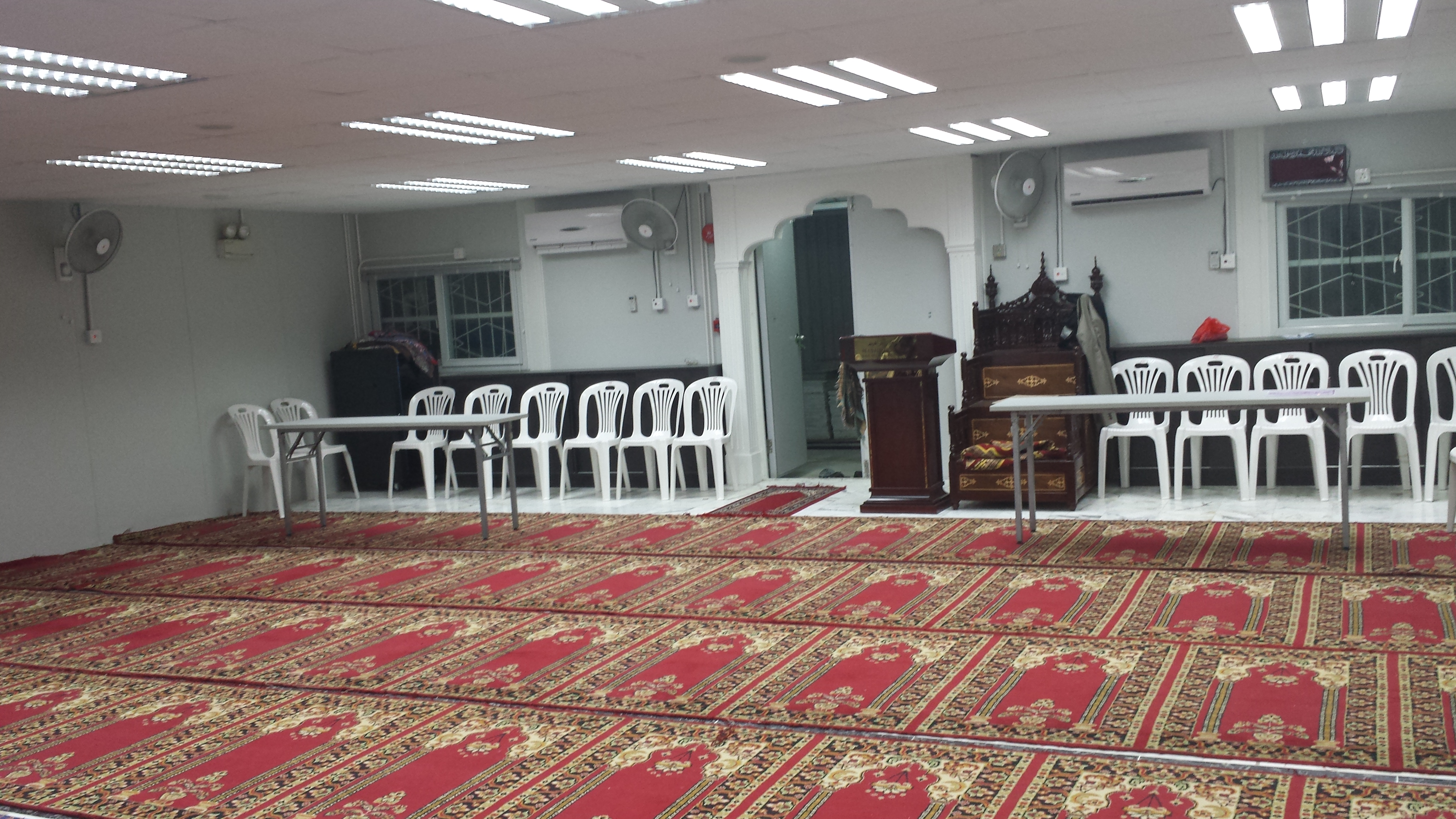

- Location within Hong Kong

Religion
- Affiliation: Islam
- Branch/tradition: Sunni
- Governing body: Masjid Ibrahim Management Committee
- Patron: United Welfare Union Hong Kong Limited

Location
- Location: 300-310 Ferry Street, Mong Kok, Hong Kong, China
- Interactive map of Ibrahim Mosque
- Coordinates: 22°19′N 114°10′E

Architecture
- Type: mosque
- Established: 2013; 13 years ago
- Groundbreaking: 2013; 13 years ago
- Completed: 24 November 2013; 12 years ago
- Construction cost: HK$ 4.7 million

Specifications
- Capacity: 500 worshippers
- Dome: 1

The Ibrahim Mosque (Chinese: 易卜拉欣清真寺; pinyin: Yìbolāxīn Qīngzhēnsì) is a mosque in Mong Kok, Hong Kong. It is the sixth and latest mosque built in Hong Kong. The mosque was constructed and is managed by the United Welfare Union Hong Kong Limited.

== History ==
In March 2011, a Muslim group approached the government for a land to build a mosque. A piece of land was offered by the government for one year but the offer was declined, instead a site at Hoi Wan Road was identified to be more suitable. On 20 September 2012, the Lands Department approved the application and the site was handed over to the United Welfare Union Hong Kong on 1 February 2013.

The construction of the mosque started in July 2013. It was completed and inaugurated on 24 November 2013.

The Lease expired, and the land was taken back by the government by the end of 2019. However, the government had offered an alternate site which was accepted in 2019. The construction on the new site started in July 2020. On 1 January 2020, the construction was partially completed. The previous Masjid was then demolished, and the Masjid Ibrahim officially moved to the new site in Mong Kok.

As of 2020, the land is under a bridge on Ferry Street, respectively between its junction with Soy Street and Shantung Street. The management aims to complete the construction by late 2020, and expand service provision for Muslim community.

== Architecture ==
The mosque has several facilities such as ablution room, pantry, classrooms, conference room and an office for Imam. These are divided into sections for men and women, to be kept separate according to religious and cultural values and norms.

== Transportation ==
The mosque is accessible within walking distance from Exit E1 at Mong Kok station of the MTR.

== See also ==
- Islam in Hong Kong
- List of mosques in Hong Kong
- List of mosques in China
