= Jamia Mosque (Hong Kong) =

Oldest mosque in Hong Kong

- 些利街清真寺
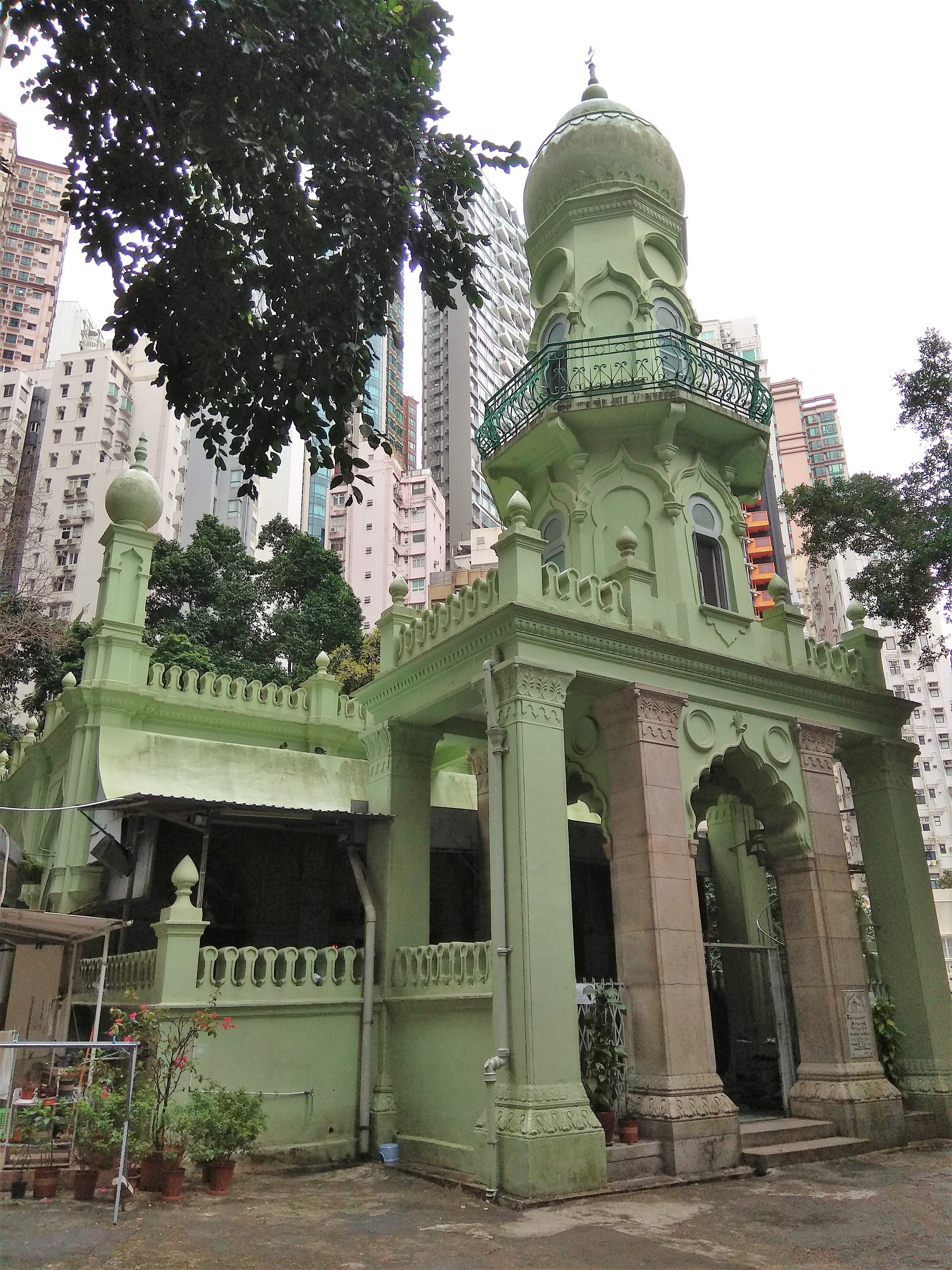

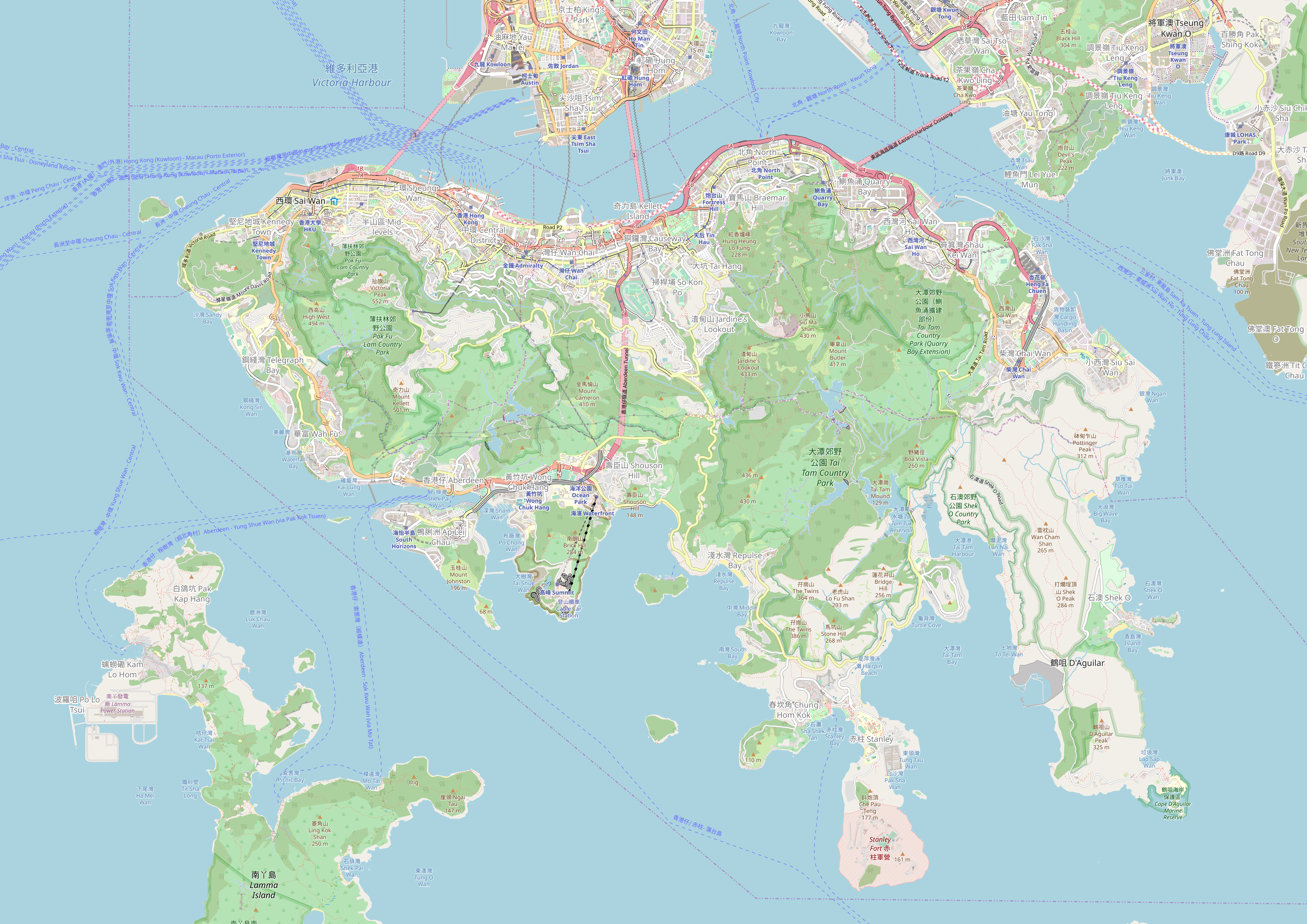
- Location of the mosque on Hong Kong Island

Religion
- Affiliation: Sunni Islam
- Ecclesiastical or organizational status: Friday mosque
- Leadership: Mufti Abdul Zaman (Imam)
- Status: Active

Location
- Location: 30 Shelley Street, Mid-Levels, Hong Kong
- Country: China
- Interactive map of Jamia Mosque
- Coordinates: 22°16′49″N 114°9′7″E

Architecture
- Type: Mosque
- Funded by: Haji Mohamed Essack Elias
- Completed: 1890 (original building); 1915 (current building)

Specifications
- Capacity: 400 worshipers
- Minaret: 1
- Materials: Concrete; bricks

Website
- Official website

Hong Kong Graded Building – Grade I
- Official name: Jamia Mosque
- Type: Cultural
- Criteria: Religion
- Designated: May 2010
- Reference no.: M0130

Hong Kong Graded Building – Grade II
- Official name: Residence of Muslims at Jamia Mosque
- Type: Cultural
- Criteria: Religion

The Jamia Mosque is a Friday mosque in Mid-Levels, Hong Kong. Completed in 1890, it is the oldest mosque in Hong Kong. The neighbouring streets – Mosque Street and Mosque Junction – are named after the mosque. Mufti Abdul Zaman is the main Imam and he leads prayers and taraweeh during Ramadan.

== History ==
The mosque was built in 1890 on a piece of land leased by the British Hong Kong government for 999 years. The treaty for the land was granted on 23 December 1850.

Initially, the mosque was named Mohammedan Mosque. Extension of the building took place in 1915 which made the mosque into a larger building. After World War II, the mosque was renamed Jamia Mosque. It is also known as Lascar Temple.

There has been a plan to construct an Islamic Cultural Center by its side in the future.

== Architecture ==
The mosque has a rectangular shape with an arched main entrance and Arabic-style arched windows on all sides.

A three-storey residential building next to the mosque provides rent-free accommodation to followers. It was probably built in the early 20th century. In May 2010, the mosque was classified as a Grade I building by the Government of Hong Kong, inscribed as "outstanding merits of which every effort should be made to preserve if possible." The nearby three-storey residential building has been classified as a Grade II building.

== Transportation ==
The mosque is accessible within walking distance South West from Central station of the MTR, via the Central–Mid-Levels escalator.

== Gallery ==
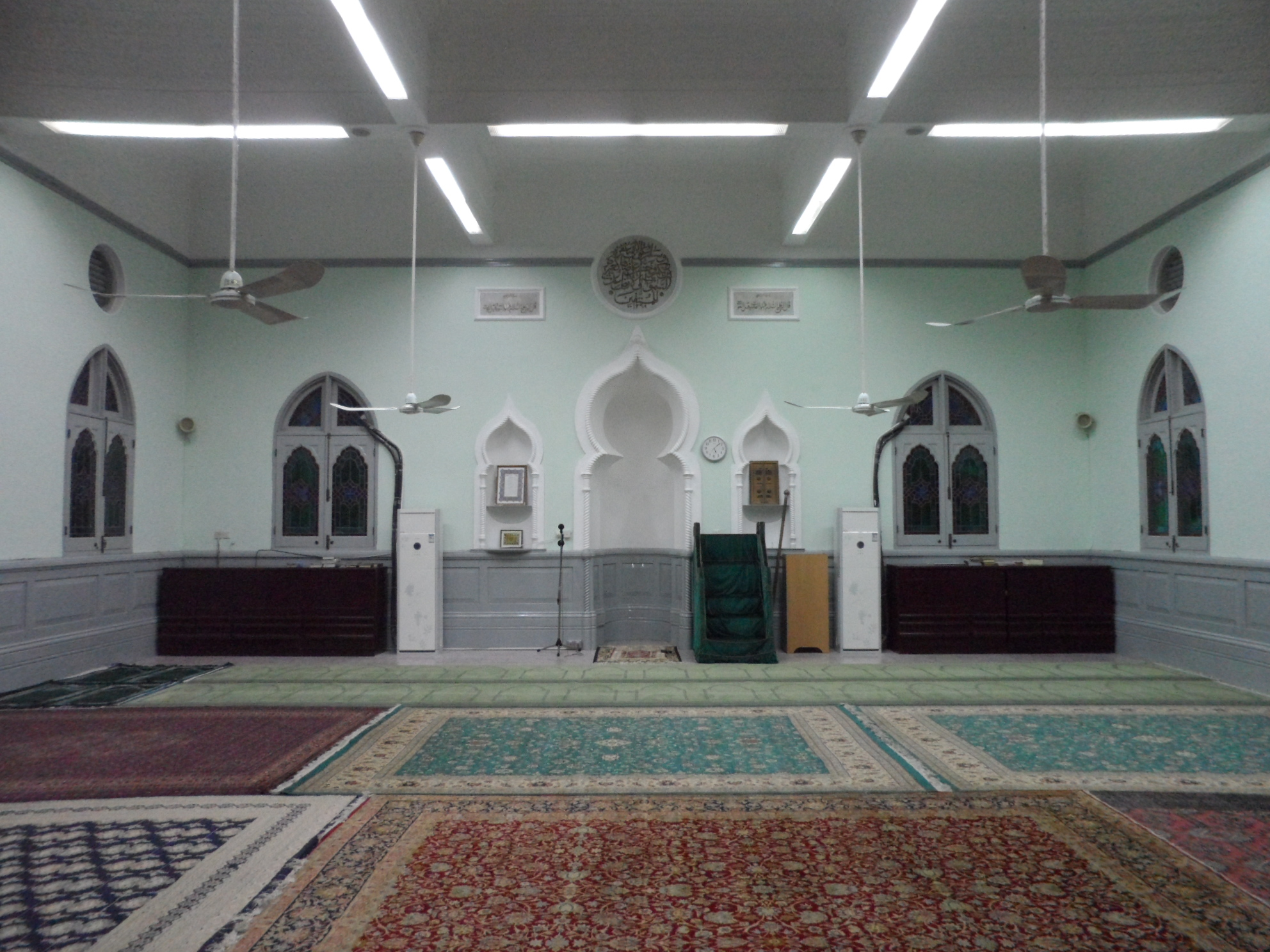
The mosque prayer hall

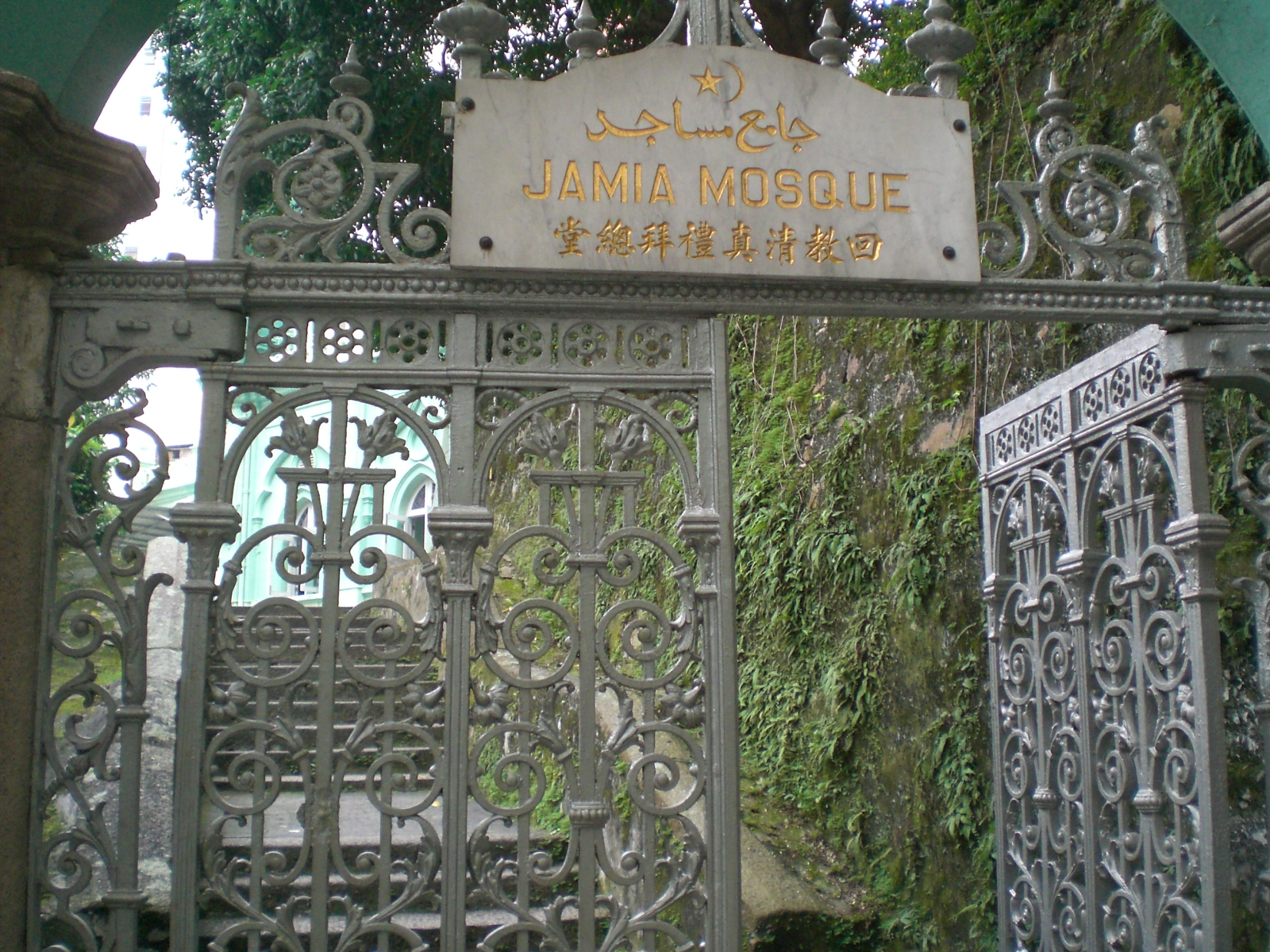
The entrance to the mosque

== See also ==
Jamia Mosque
- Traditional Chinese: 些利街清真寺
- Literal meaning: Shelley Street Mosque
Transcriptions
Yue: Cantonese
- Yale Romanization: Sē leih gāai chīng jān jih
- Jyutping: Se1 lei6 gaai1 cing1 yan1 jy6

Alternative Chinese name
- Traditional Chinese: 回教清真禮拜總堂
Transcriptions
Yue: Cantonese
- Yale Romanization: Wùih gaau chīng jān láih baai júng tòhng
- Jyutping: Wui4 gaau3 cing1 zan1 lai5 baai3 zung2 tong4

- Islam in Hong Kong
- List of mosques in Hong Kong
- List of mosques in China
- Central and Western Heritage Trail
- Incorporated Trustees of the Islamic Community Fund of Hong Kong
