= Incorporated Trustees of the Islamic Community Fund of Hong Kong =

Religious organization based in Hong Kong, China

- 香港回教信託基金總會
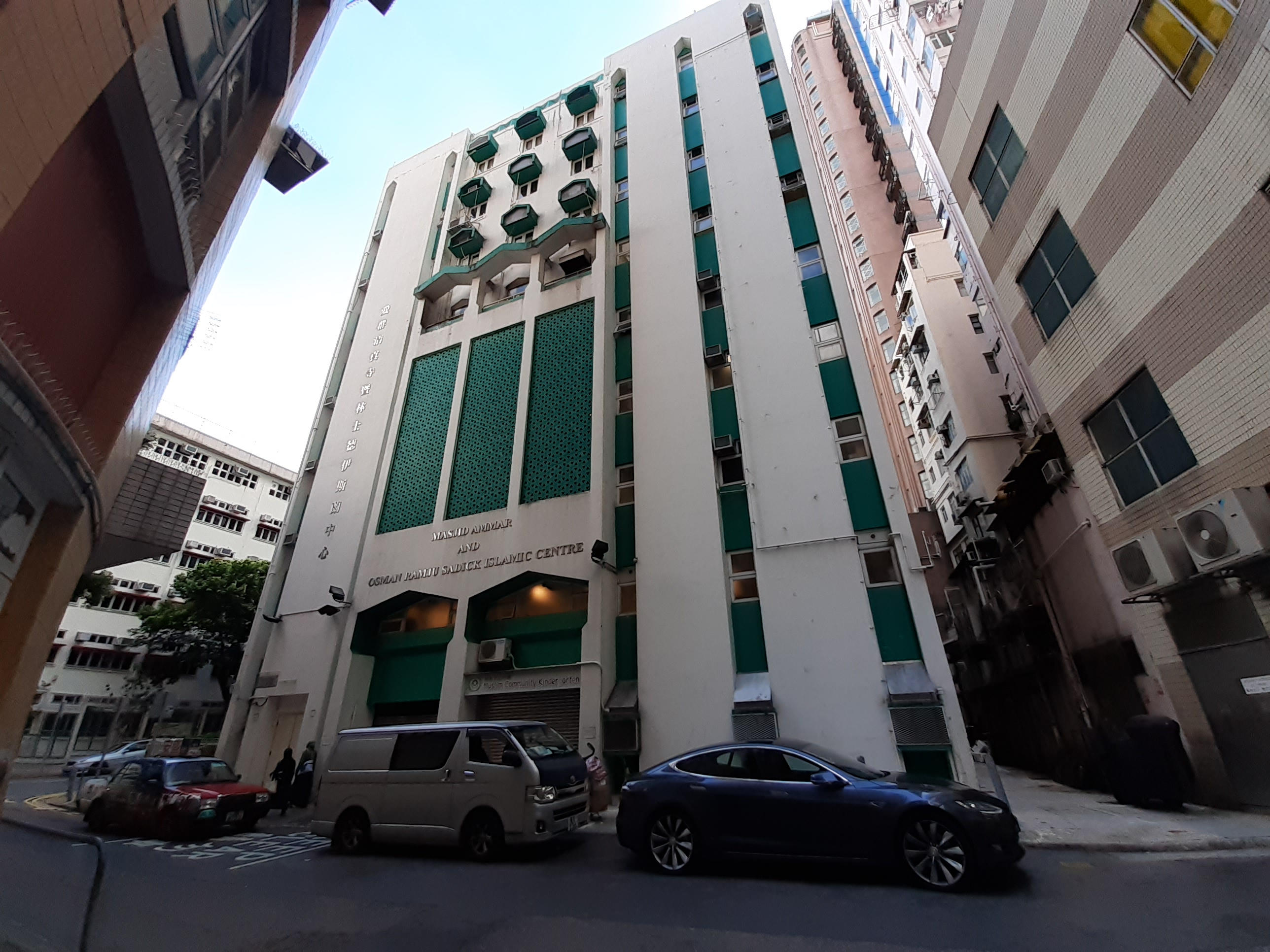
- Headquarters: Ammar Mosque, Wan Chai, Hong Kong, China
- Coordinates: 22°16′39″N 114°10′44″E
- Region served: Hong Kong
- Website: Official website

Incorporated Trustees of the Islamic Community Fund of Hong Kong
- Traditional Chinese: 香港回教信託基金總會
- Simplified Chinese: 香港回教信托基金总会
Transcriptions
Standard Mandarin
- Hanyu Pinyin: Xiānggǎng Huíjiào Xìntuō Jījīn Zǒng Huì
Yue: Cantonese
- Jyutping: hoeng1 gong2 wui4 gaau3 seon3 tok3 gei1 gam1 zung2 wui6

The Incorporated Trustees of the Islamic Community Fund of Hong Kong (Chinese: 香港回教信託基金總會) is an organisation recognised by the Government of Hong Kong for the Muslim communities in Hong Kong. It is generally known as The Board of Trustees among local Muslims. The board office is located at the Ammar Mosque.

The board manages the Jamia Mosque, Ammar Mosque, Chai Wan Mosque and Kowloon Mosque and also the Cape Collinson Muslim Cemetery and Happy Valley Muslim Cemetery.

== History ==
The certificate of incorporation for the trustees was issued on 1 December 1970 and the trustees is recognised by the Government of Hong Kong as the main body representing the interests of the Muslim communities in Hong Kong.

== Main functions ==
- To manage the mosques and Muslim cemeteries in Hong Kong
- To control the subscribed, donated and bequeathed funds
- To make all arrangements for funerals and burials of deceased Muslims
- To organise prayers for special occasions, e.g. Eid al-Fitr
- To undertake any other actions in the general interests of the Hong Kong Muslims and propagation of Islam

== Organisations affiliated to the trustees ==
- Islamic Union of Hong Kong
- Pakistan Association of Hong Kong
- Hong Kong Dawoodi Bohra Association
- Indian Muslim Association of Hong Kong

== See also ==
- Islam in China
- Islam in Hong Kong
- Islamic Association of China
- Chinese Muslim Association
