= Arab Chamber of Commerce and Industry =

The Arab Chamber of Commerce & Industry
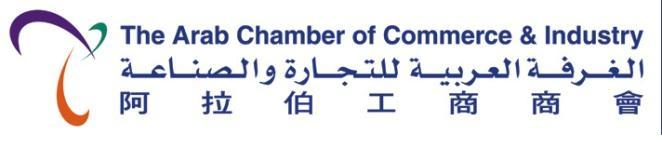
- Founded: 2006
- Type: Non-profit civil society
- Purpose: Business advocacy
- Location: Hong Kong
- Region served: Hong Kong
- Key people: Edwin Hitti, President
- Website: Official website

The Arab Chamber of Commerce and Industry (ARABCCI), also known as ArabCham, is a non-profit organization based in Hong Kong. Established in 2006, it promotes commercial ties between Greater China and the Arab world.

== Activities ==
=== Shariah Advisory Council ===
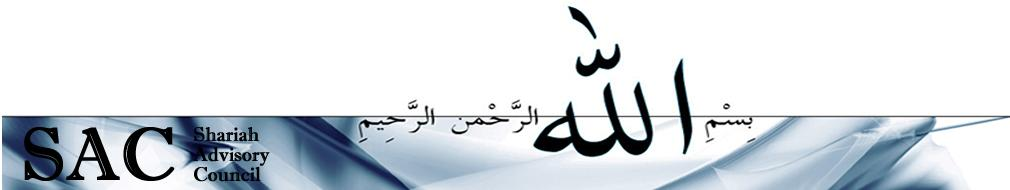
Shariah Advisory Council Banner

In 2007, the Chamber established a Shariah Advisory Council. Composed of Islamic legal experts, the council provides guidance on Shariah compliance for banking services, financial products, and commercial establishments in the region.

=== Hong Kong Islamic Index ===
In 2007, the Chamber created the Hong Kong Islamic Index (HKII) to support Hong Kong's development as an Islamic financial center. The index tracks Shariah-compliant companies listed on the Hong Kong Stock Exchange. It initially comprised 78 companies, split evenly between Hong Kong and mainland China-based firms

=== Amwal Credit Union ===
ACU Logo

The Chamber established the Amwal Credit Union in 2009 to provide Shariah-compliant financial services. It is a member of the Credit Union League of Hong Kong.

=== International Islamic Mediation and Arbitration Centre ===
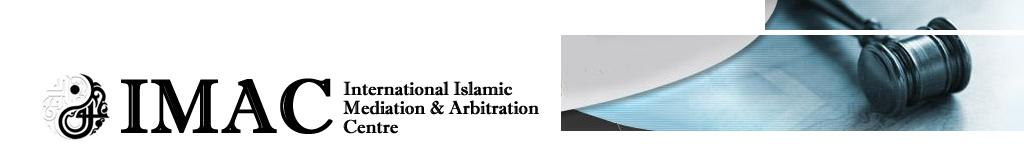
International Islamic Mediation and Arbitration Centre Banner

In 2008, the Chamber established the International Islamic Mediation & Arbitration Centre (IMAC) to handle commercial disputes in accordance with Islamic legal principles.

=== The Mosque Building Fund ===
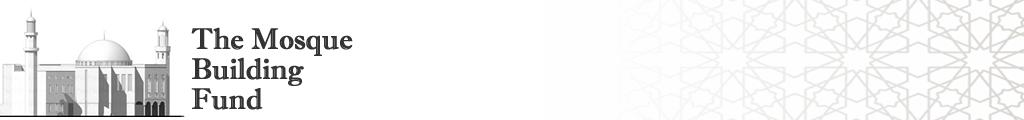
The Mosque Building Fund Banner

The Mosque Building Fund (MBF) is a charitable fund established by The Arab Chamber of Commerce and Industry in 2008. Its purpose is to finance the construction of mosques, community centers, and other facilities for the Islamic community. The fund collects donations from individuals and institutions, including mandatory Zakat contributions. These facilities serve Hong Kong's Muslim population, which is estimated at 300,000 people.

=== HK Institute of Islamic Studies ===
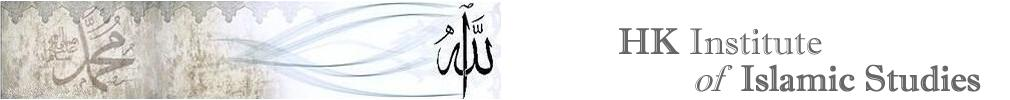
Hong Kong Institute of Islamic Studies Banner

The Hong Kong Institute of Islamic Studies (HKIS) was established by The Arab Chamber of Commerce and Industry in 2008 and offers educational programs in Islamic Law (Shariah), Islamic Finance and Banking, and Islamic Insurance (Takaful). Programs are offered in co-operation with the Institute of Professional Education and Knowledge of Hong Kong.

== Affiliations ==
The Arab Chamber of Commerce and Industry is a member of the Islamic Financial Services Board (IFSB), ICC- World Chambers Network (WCN), World Association of Non-Governmental Organizations (WANGO), and a subscriber to the World Bank- Civil Society Organization.
