= Sheung Yeung =

Village in Hong Kong

Coordinates: 22.311778°N 114.284602°E

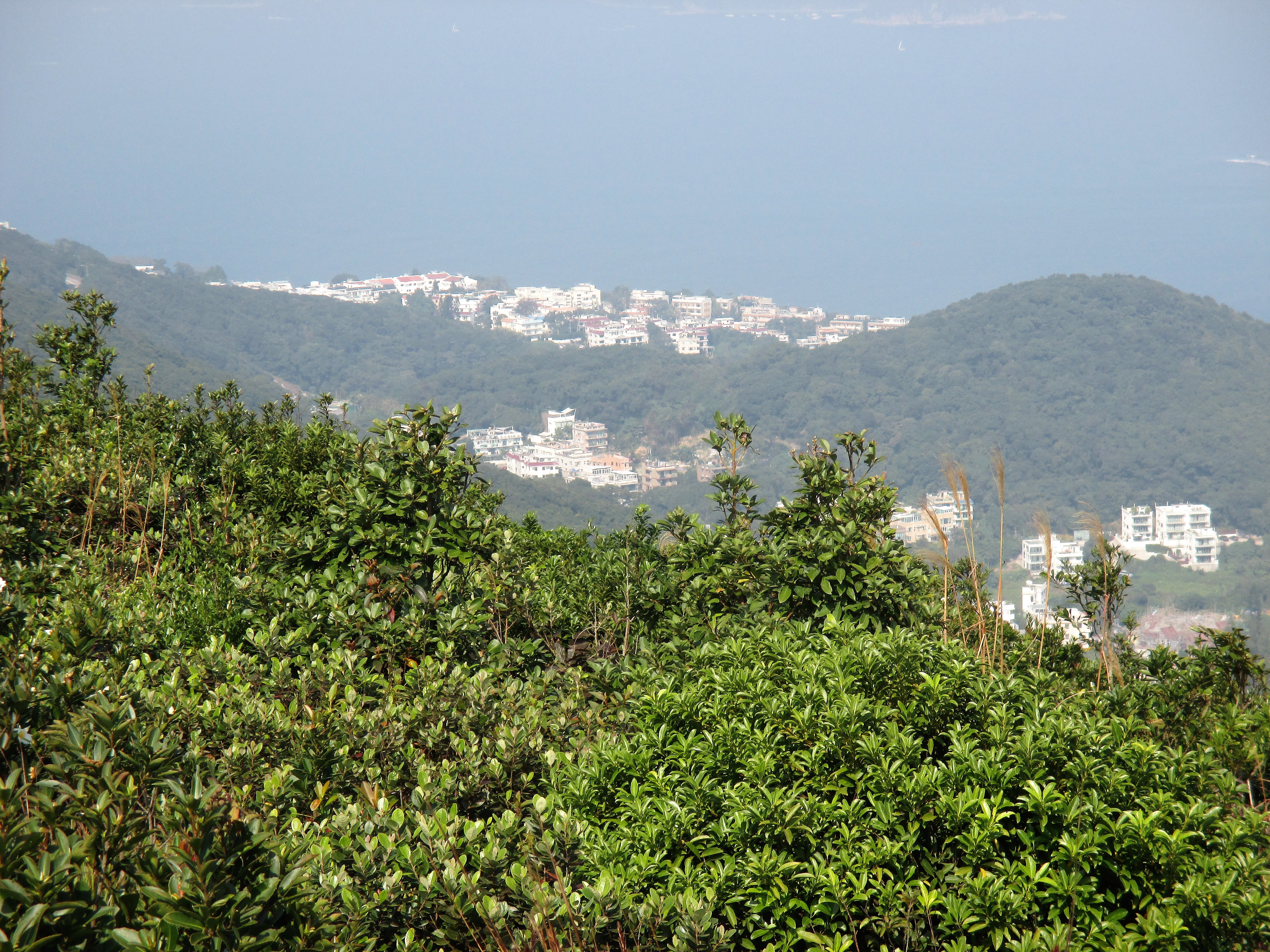
Sheung Yeung (centre and right) and Ng Fai Tin (on the hill) viewed from High Junk Peak Country Trail.

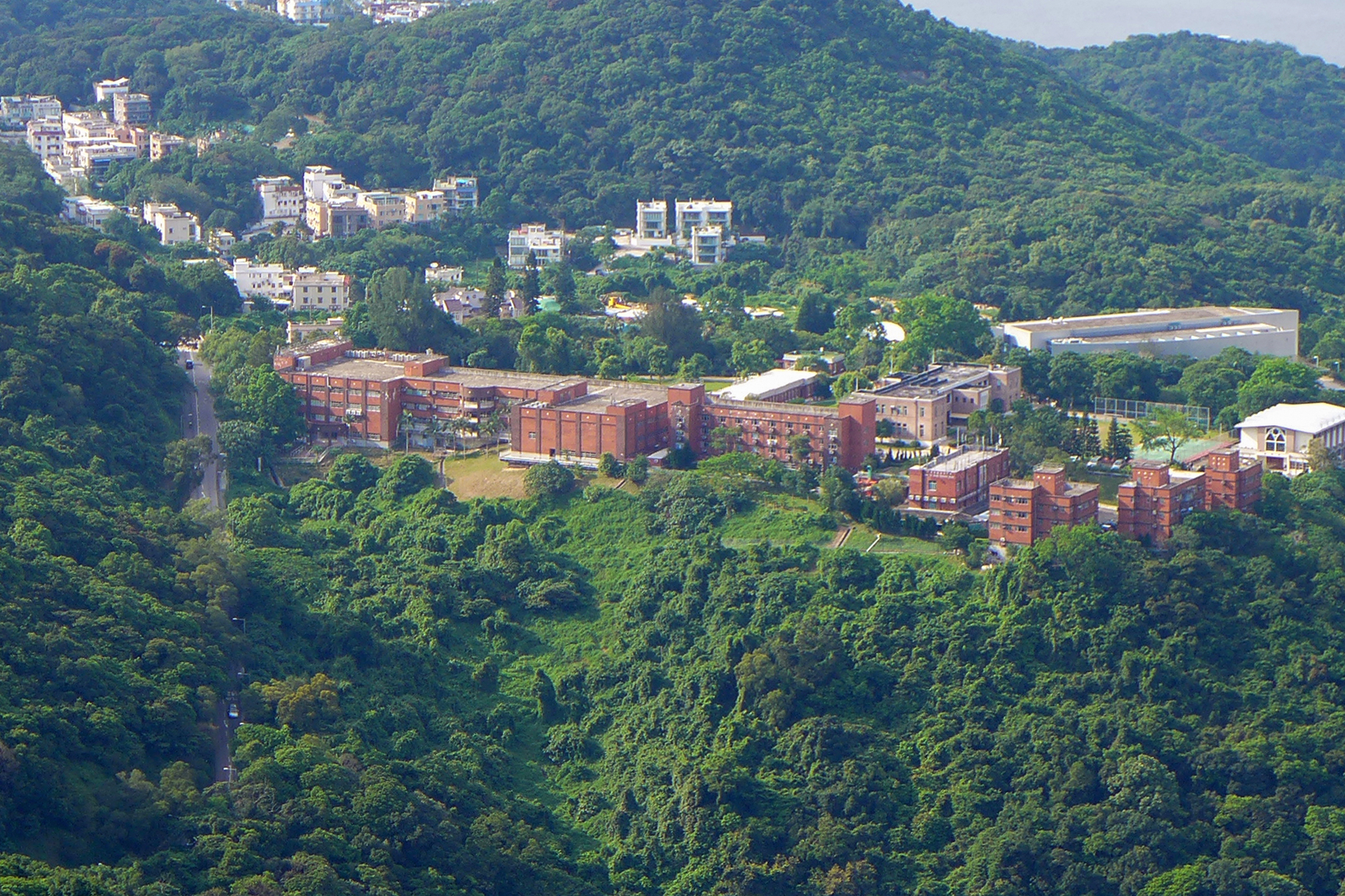
Hong Kong Adventist College in Sheung Yeung.

Sheung Yeung (Chinese: 上洋) is a village in Sai Kung District, New Territories, Hong Kong.

== Administration ==
Sheung Yeung is a recognized village under the New Territories Small House Policy.

== History ==
At the time of the 1911 census, the population of Sheung Yeung was 85. The number of males was 34.

== See also ==
- Hong Kong Adventist College
- Sheung Sze Wan
