= Sheung Sze Wan (village) =

Village in Hong Kong

Coordinates: 22.305711°N 114.29146°E

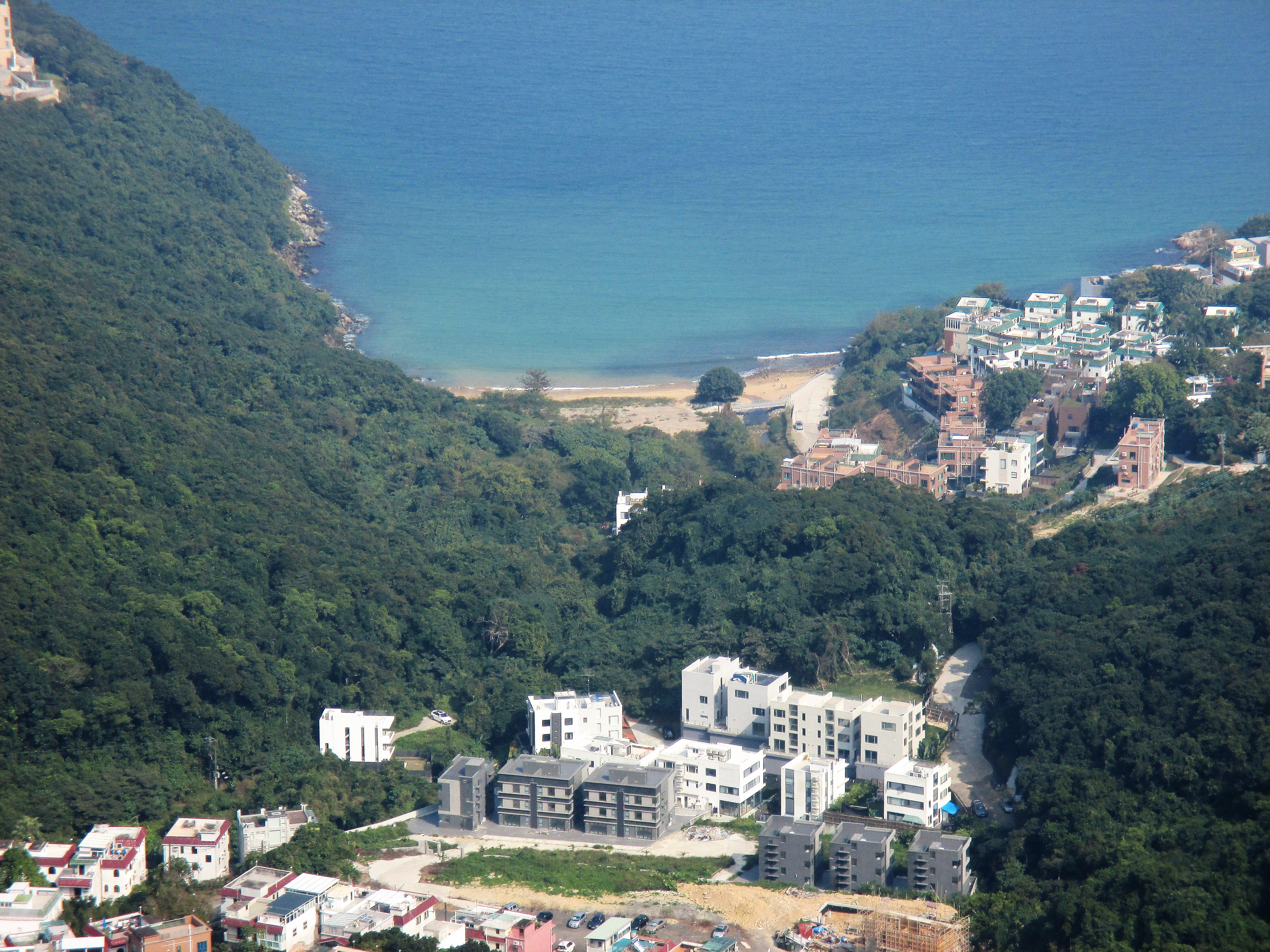
Ha Yeung (foreground), Sheung Sze Wan Beach and Sheung Sze Wan Village (right) viewed from High Junk Peak Country Trail.

Seung Sz Wan also transliterated as Seung Sz Wan (Chinese: 相思灣) is a village in Sai Kung District, New Territories, Hong Kong. It is located on the western shore of the Sheung Sze Wan bay.

== Administration ==
Seung Sz Wan is a recognized village under the New Territories Small House Policy.

== History ==
Sheung Sze Wan was part of the inter-village grouping, the Ho Chung Tung (蠔涌洞) or Ho Chung Seven Villages (蠔涌七鄉), which had its centre in Ho Chung.
