= Sheung Sze Wan =

Bay of Clear Water Bay Peninsula in Sai Kung District, Hong Kong

Coordinates: 22.307924°N 114.29334°E

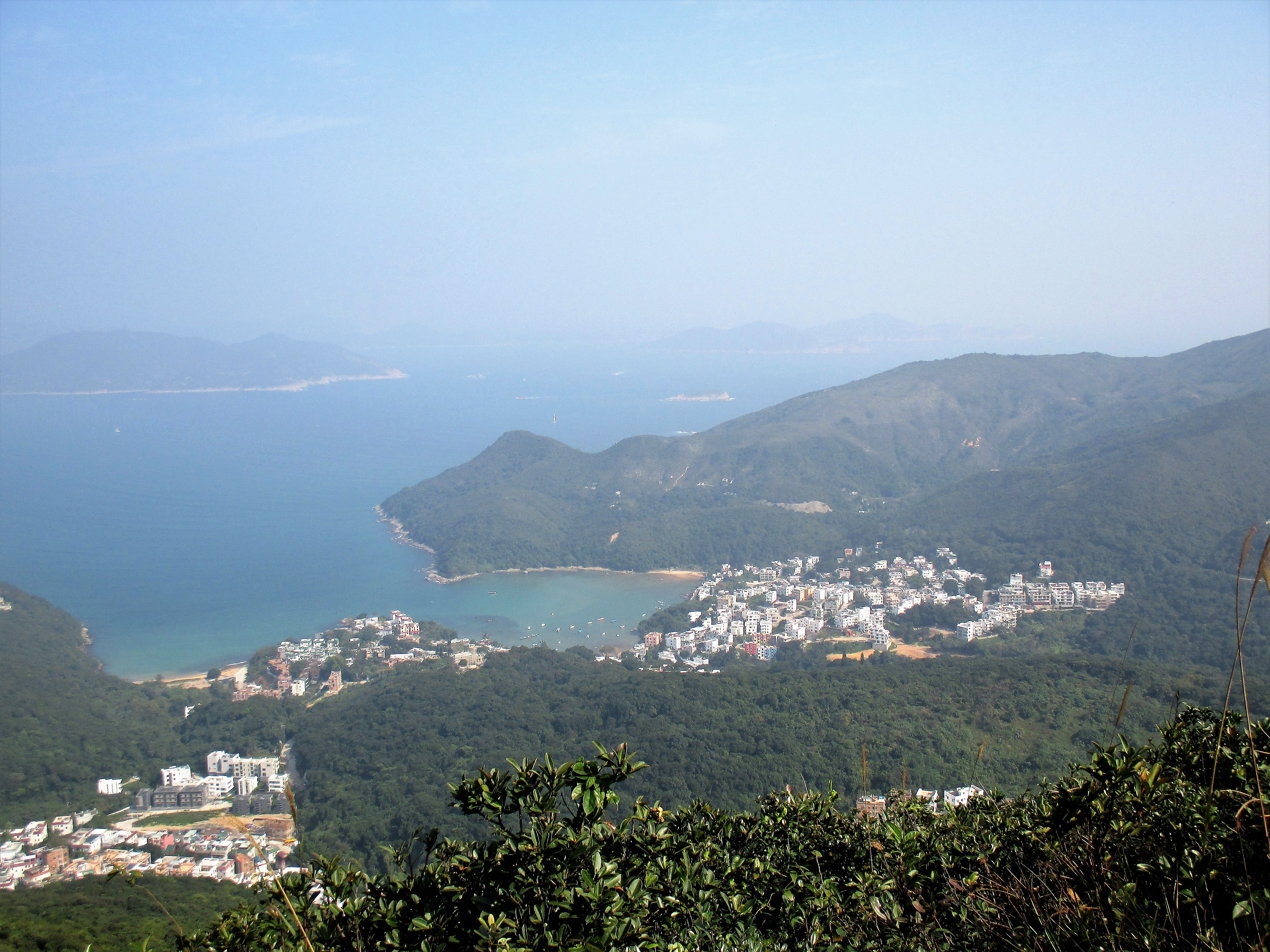
Sheung Sze Wan and surrounding villages, viewed from High Junk Peak Country Trail.

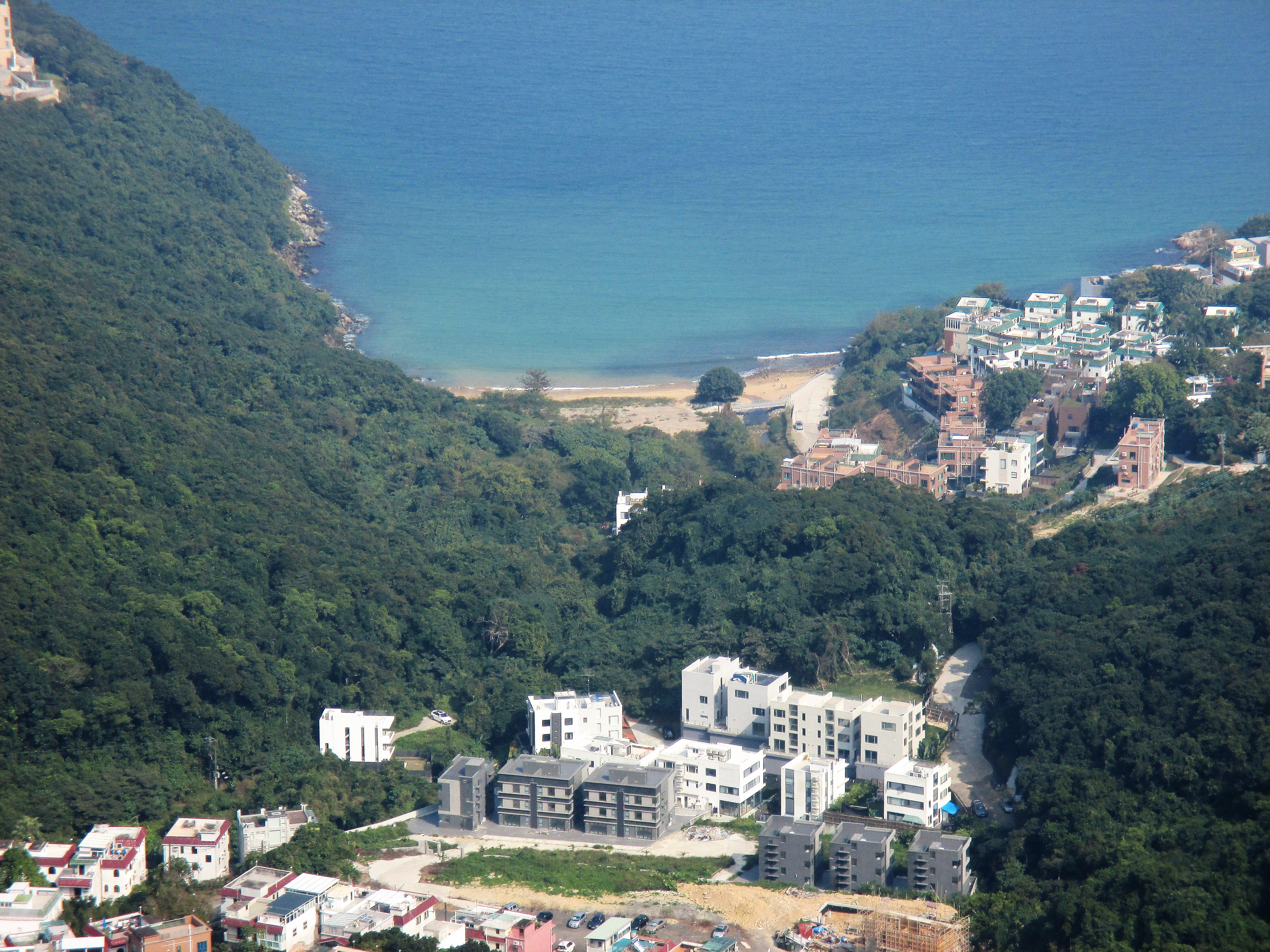
Ha Yeung (foreground), Sheung Sze Wan Beach and Sheung Sze Wan Village (right) viewed from High Junk Peak Country Trail.

Sheung Sze Wan (Chinese: 相思灣) is a bay of Clear Water Bay Peninsula in Sai Kung District, Hong Kong.

Sheung Sze Wan is also the name of a village located on the western shore of the bay.

== Villages ==
Villages in the area include:

- Ha Yeung
- Ha Yeung New Village (下洋新村)
- Leung Fai Tin (兩塊田)
- Mau Po (茅莆)
- Sheung Sze Wan (village)
- Sheung Yeung
- Siu Hang Hau (小坑口)
- Tai Hang Hau

== Features ==
- Hong Kong Adventist College
- The Portofino

== See also ==
- Clear Water Bay Road
- Cham Shan Monastery
