= Tai Leng Tung =

Hong Kong hill

- 大嶺峒
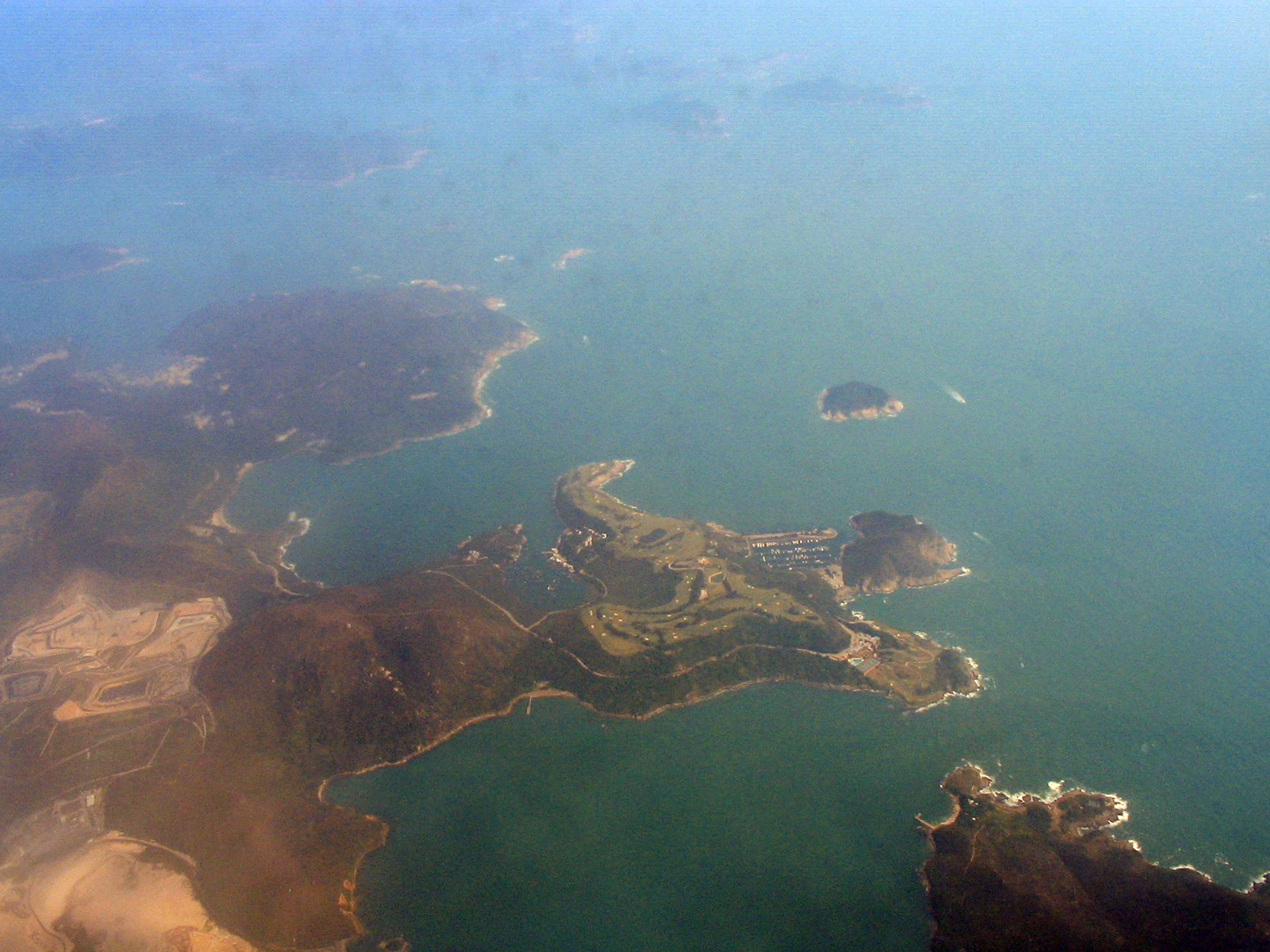
- Tai Leng Tung is on the peninsula to the upper left of the golf course in this photo

Highest point
- Elevation: 291 m (955 ft)
- Coordinates: 22°17′52″N 114°18′12″E

Geography
- Location within Hong Kong
- Location: Hong Kong

Tai Leng Tung (Chinese: 大嶺峒) is a hill in Hong Kong. It is situated in Clear Water Bay Country Park, and stands at a height of 291 metres (955 ft) above sea level.

== See also ==
- List of mountains, peaks and hills in Hong Kong
- Tai Wan Tau, a village located at the base of the hill in its south
