= Tai Hang Hau =

Coordinates: 22.303323°N 114.294679°E

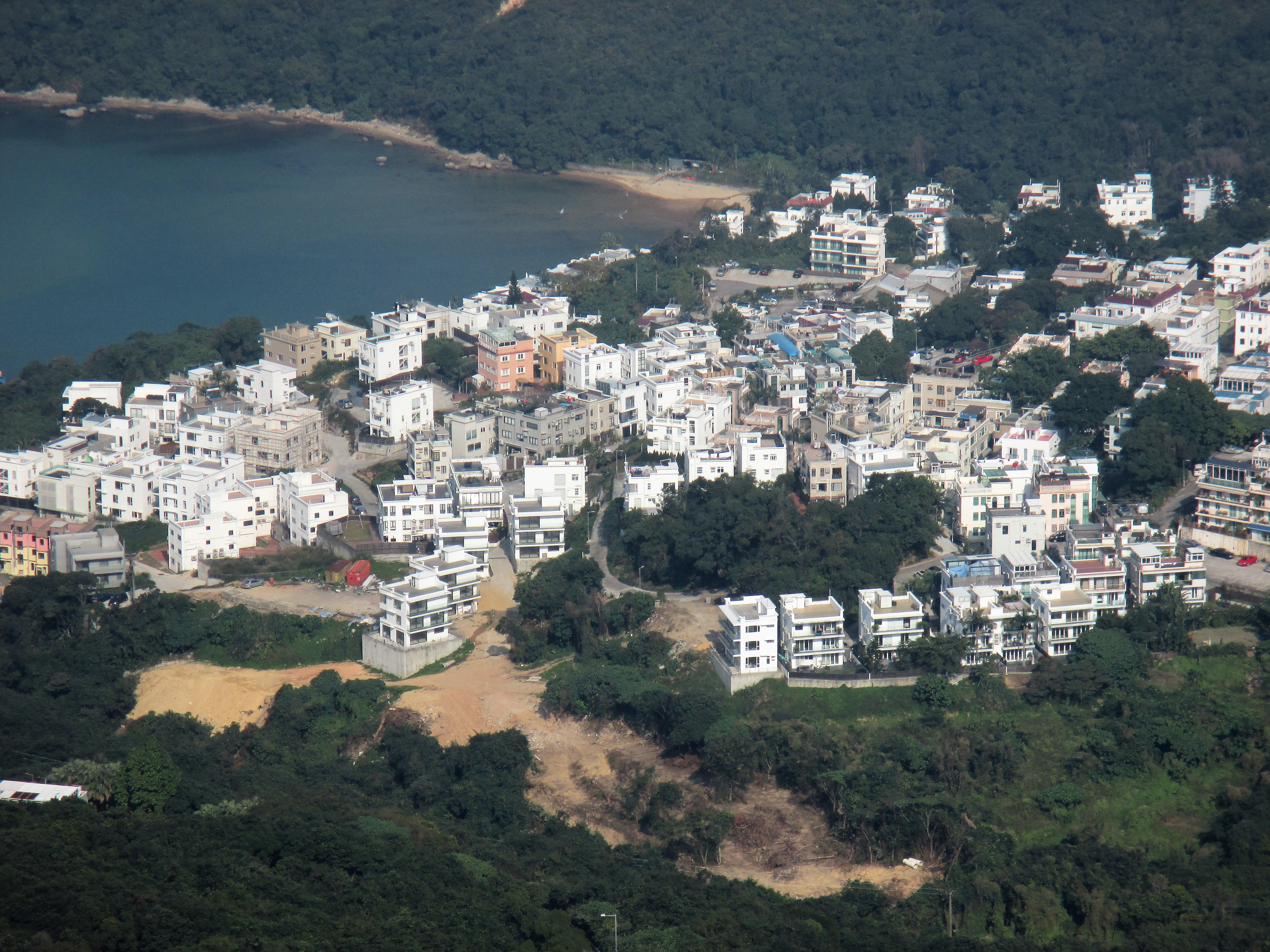
Tai Hang Hau and Mau Po (茅莆, foreground left) along the shore of Sheung Sze Wan, viewed from High Junk Peak Country Trail.

Tai Hang Hau (Chinese: 大坑口) is a village in Sai Kung District, New Territories, Hong Kong.

== Administration ==
Tai Hang Hau is a recognized village under the New Territories Small House Policy.

== See also ==
- Sheung Sze Wan
