= Clear Water Bay =

Bay in Sai Kung District, Hong Kong

Coordinates: 22.28401°N 114.29352°E

- Traditional Chinese: 清水灣
- Simplified Chinese: 清水湾
Transcriptions
Standard Mandarin
- Hanyu Pinyin: Qīngshuǐwān
Yue: Cantonese
- Yale Romanization: Chīng séui wāan
- Jyutping: cing^{1} seoi^{2} waan^{1}

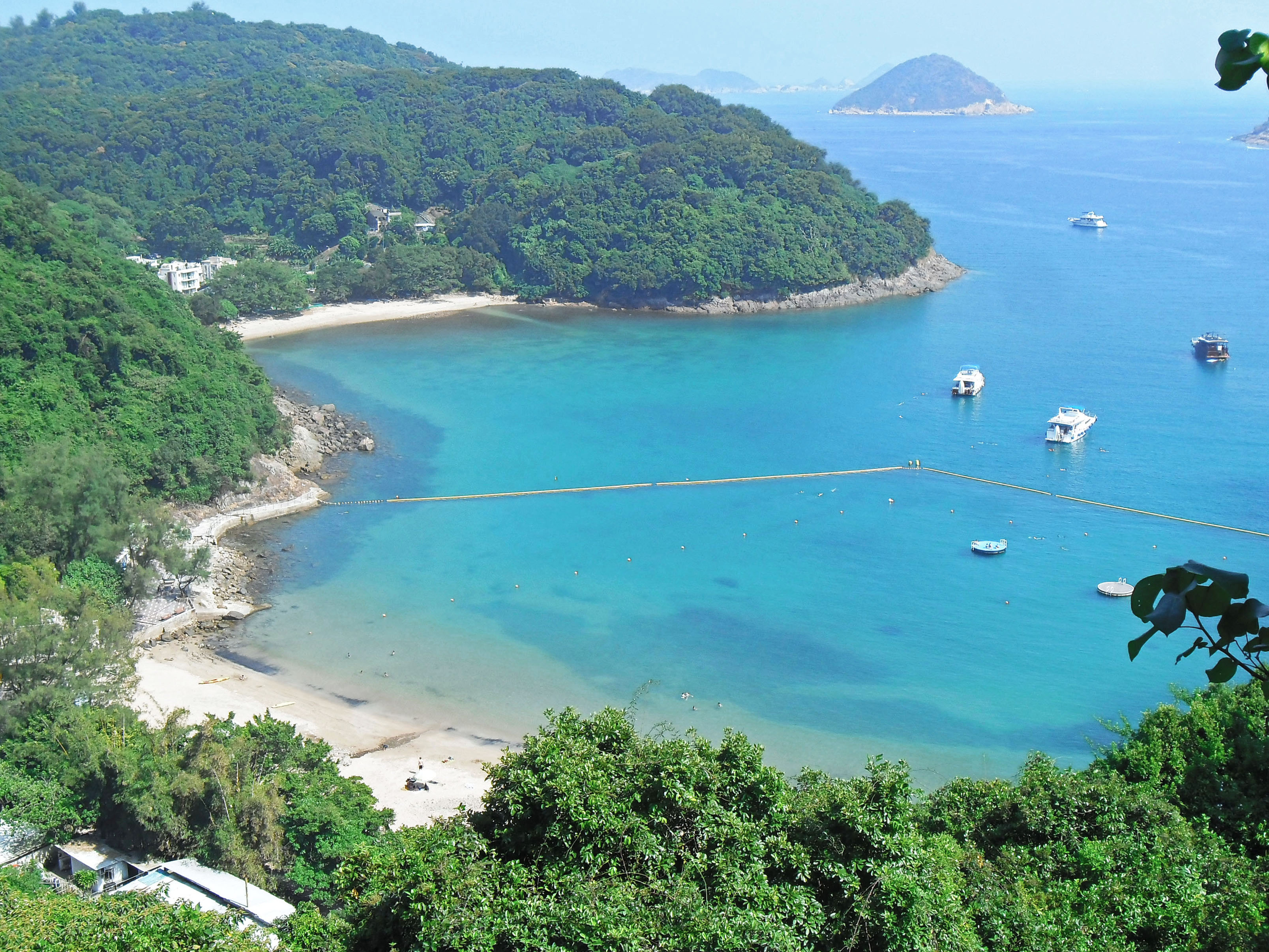
Clear Water Bay 1st Beach in September 2014.

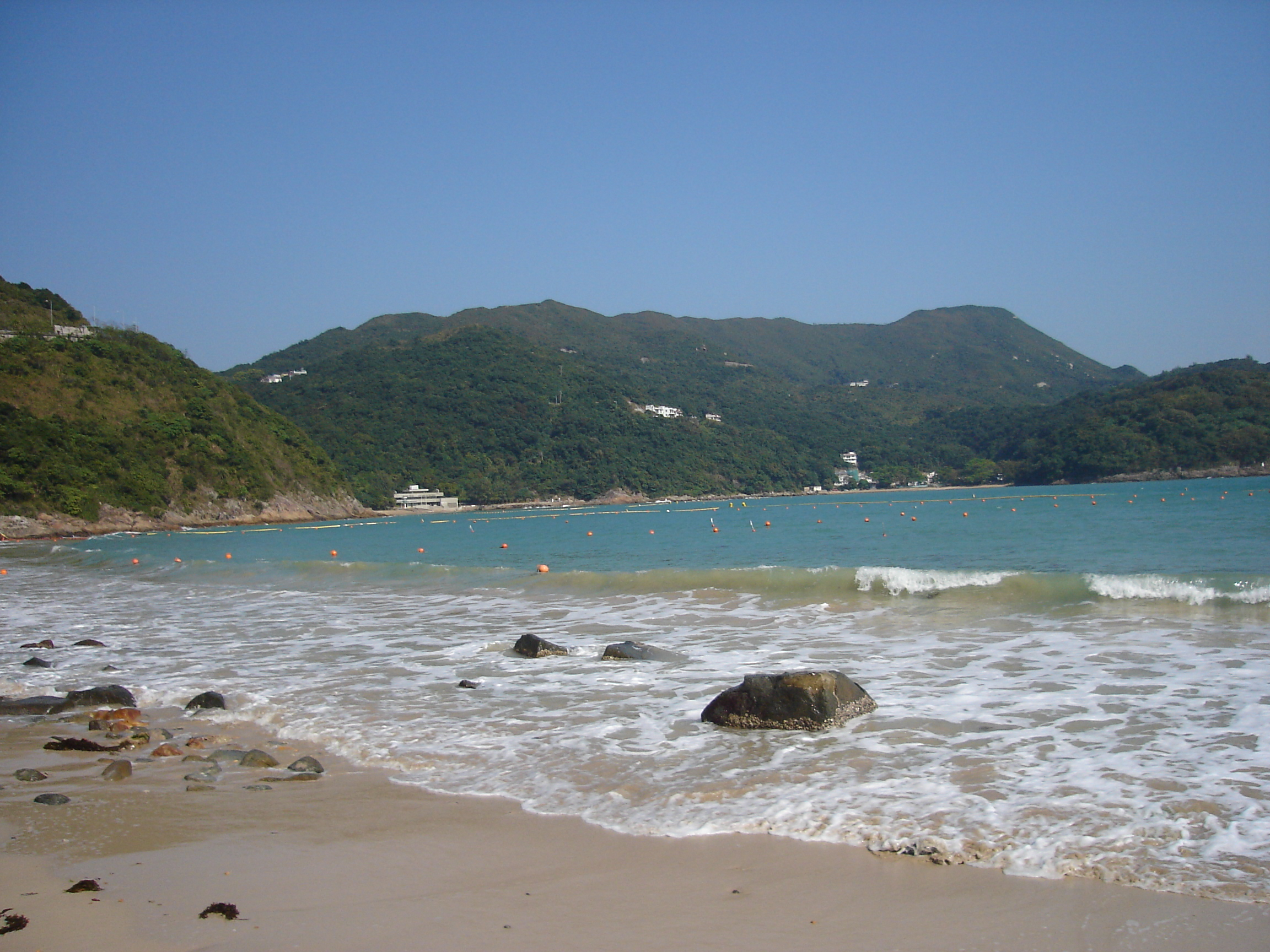
View from Clear Water Bay 2nd Beach toward Clear Water Bay 1st Beach and the village of Tai Wan Tau.

Clear Water Bay (Chinese: 清水灣; Jyutping: cing^{1} seoi^{2} waan^{1}) is a bay on the eastern shore of Clear Water Bay Peninsula of Hong Kong, located within Clear Water Bay Country Park. There are two beaches at Clear Water Bay: "Clear Water Bay First Beach" and "Clear Water Bay Second Beach". The name is also used to describe the area around the bay on the peninsula.

== Beaches ==
During the summer, both beaches have life guards on duty. Changing rooms, lockers, shower facilities, toilets and rafts are available at both beaches. A BBQ area can only be found on the first beach, but there is a kiosk selling refreshment on the second beach.

There is an unavoidable flight of stairs of about 100 steps for both beaches, so strollers and wheelchairs cannot be used to access the beaches.

Both beaches are protected by shark nets after three fatal shark attacks occurred in 1995. On 13 June 1995, a 49-year-old woman Wong Kui-Yong (王桂容) had her left forearm and left leg bitten off by a shark at Clear Water Bay 1st beach. She died of her injuries.

== Area ==
Features in the Clear Water Bay area include:

- Hong Kong University of Science and Technology
- The former headquarters of Shaw Brothers Studio and TVB City
- High Junk Peak
- Religious buildings including Cham Shan Monastery and Tai Miu, Hong Kong's oldest and largest Tin Hau Temple
- Several villages, including Po Toi O and Tai Wan Tau

== Transport ==
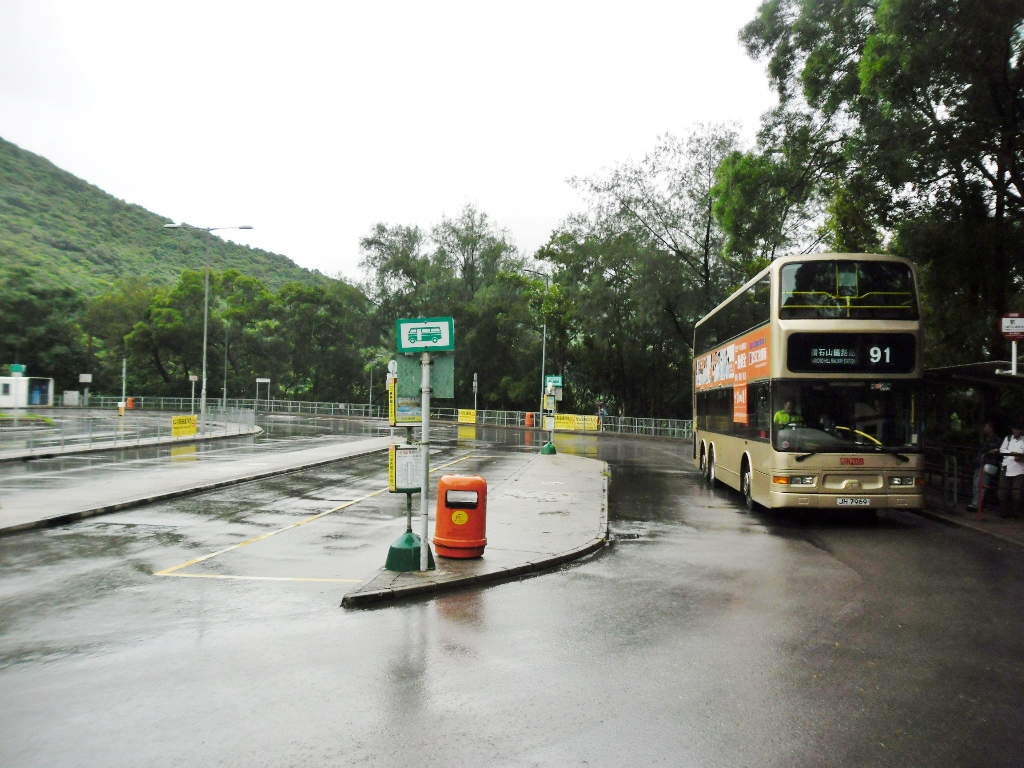
Clear Water Bay bus terminus.

- Tai Au Mun Road (connects Clear Water Bay Road at Tai Au Mun)

=== Buses ===
- 91 - Plaza Hollywood in Diamond Hill to Clear Water Bay 2nd Beach

=== Minibuses ===
- Green Minibus 16 - Po Lam to Po Toi O
- Green Minibus 103 - Kwun Tong Ferry Pier to Clear Water Bay 2nd Beach
- Green Minibus 103M - Tseung Kwan O station Public Transport Interchange to Clear Water Bay 2nd Beach
- Red Minibus - No Number, because only one type of bus for the red minibus trail or route. Ngau Chi Wan Minibus Terminus to Clear Water Bay 2nd Beach

=== Parking ===
Uncovered free parking is available at Clear Water Bay Second Beach. The car park is usually full on summer weekends so taking public transport is advisable.

== Education ==
Clear Water Bay is in Primary One Admission (POA) School Net 95. Within the school net are multiple aided schools (operated independently but funded with government money) and one government school: Tseung Kwan O Government Primary School (將軍澳官立小學).

== See also ==
- Beaches of Hong Kong
