= Charcoal-burning suicide =

Method of suicide

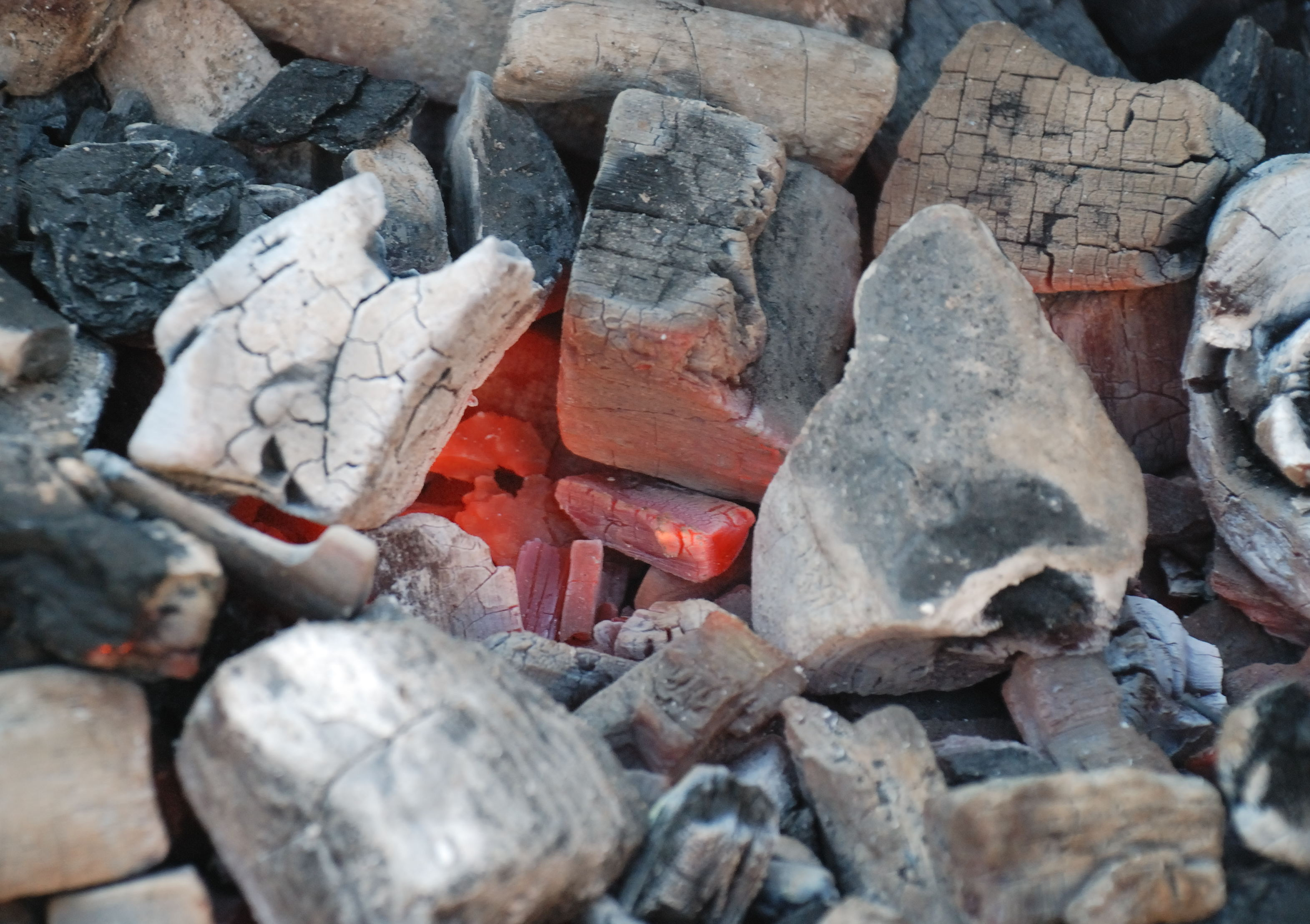
Ember of Charcoal

Charcoal-burning suicide is a suicide method which is achieved by burning charcoal in a closed room or area. Death occurs by carbon monoxide poisoning.

== Mechanism of action ==
As the charcoal burns, the concentration of carbon monoxide (CO), produced by the incomplete combustion of carbon, gradually increases. The carbon monoxide (CO) rapidly binds to hemoglobin, compromising the transport of oxygen within the body. This results in death by hypoxia caused by acute carbon monoxide poisoning. CO concentrations of as little as one part per thousand can be fatal if inhaled over a period of two hours.

Some survivors who attempted the method report that they chose it because they considered it "easy and painless" when compared with other suicide methods. Unlike jumping from a great height or cutting oneself with a knife, the person does not have to confront the fear of pain. The practice is often associated with alcohol or hypnotic drugs, and many survivors report not having felt any discomfort.

Some dispute the claim that the process is painless, noting that oxygen deprivation can cause asphyxia and a consequent involuntary struggle response by the body, mediated by changes in pH detected by chemoreceptors in the medulla oblongata. However, this claim is based on a misunderstanding of the method, which causes death not through lack of oxygen but through the accumulation of CO in the blood serum. Symptoms of acute CO poisoning include, among others, headache, nausea, tachycardia, and seizures. Someone rescued while still alive will require intensive care treatment and may suffer permanent brain damage as a result of hypoxia.

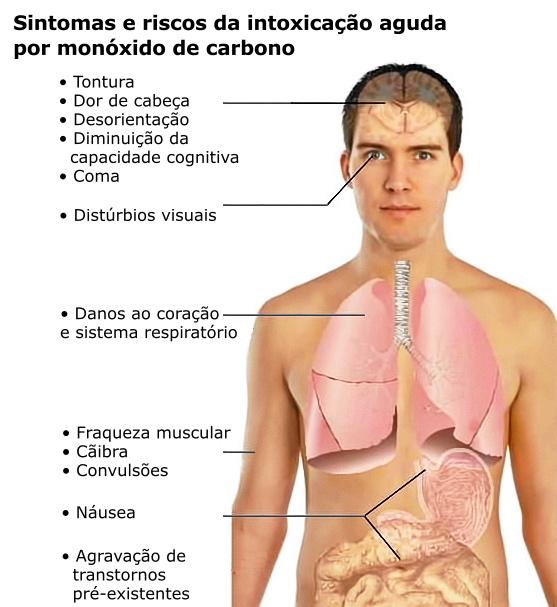
Symptoms and risks of acute carbon monoxide poisoning (CO), explaining why inhalation of gases from burning charcoal can cause death.

== History ==
One of the earliest known suicides by inhalation of charcoal fumes may have been that of Porcia Catonis. Porcia Catonis, daughter of Cato the Younger and widow of Marcus Junius Brutus, officially died from ingesting hot coals, which may have been a euphemism for suicide by burning charcoals. Amédée Berthollet, son of Claude Louis Berthollet, supposedly died by this method in 1811. The suicide method also appears in nineteenth-century literature such as Eugène Sue's The Wandering Jew (1844).

== Incidents ==
Two students of Taipei First Girls' High School ended their lives by charcoal-burning in a hotel in Su'ao, Yilan in July 1994. They left a note that did not state clearly the reason for killing themselves, even though it was suspected in some mass media that they were a lesbian couple.

A middle-aged woman in Hong Kong took her own life using this method inside her small, sealed bedroom in November 1998. She had a chemical engineering background. She was suffering from an economic depression at the time, and suicide in general was increasing. After the details of this suicide were highly publicised by local media, many others killed themselves in this way (a phenomenon sometimes called the Werther effect, as it was rumored to have occurred following the publication of the Goethe novel The Sorrows of Young Werther in 1774). Within two months, charcoal-burning had become the third most prevalent method of suicide in Hong Kong. Charcoal-burning suicide accounted for 1.7% of Hong Kong suicides in 1998 and 10.1% in 1999. By 2001, it had surpassed hanging as the second most-common method of suicide in Hong Kong (second only to jumping), accounting for about 25% of all suicide deaths. The method has since spread to mainland China, Taiwan and Japan.

Starting in 2003, authorities in Japan have observed a series of group suicides carried out by strangers who met in suicide chat rooms online. Such a group will typically use sleeping pills and charcoal stoves in a van parked in a remote area.

On 26 July 2006, 16-year-old Brazilian musician Vinícius Gageiro Marques, known by his alias Yoñlu, locked himself in his bathroom with two barbecue grills, and posted on a forum asking for help killing himself. While some people in the thread pleaded him to stop, others gave him the advice he wanted. A Canadian online friend of Marques's learned of the suicide attempt and called the Brazilian authorities. Although the police and paramedics were able to enter the apartment and clear the smoke, Marques was pronounced dead after multiple attempts at resuscitation.

Brad Delp, the lead singer of the American rock band Boston, killed himself using this method on 9 March 2007.

Kim Jong-hyun, a member of the South Korean idol group SHINee, was found unconscious in a Gangnam residential hotel on 18 December 2017. He was later pronounced dead, aged 27. The police ultimately ruled his death a suicide through the earlier text messages sent to his sister, after the discovery of charcoal briquette remnants in a frying pan at the scene.

Du Yuwei, an ex-member of the Chinese girl group GNZ48, ended her life on 16 October 2018 using this method.

On 26 May 2019, Goo Hara, a former member of South Korean idol group Kara, attempted suicide by burning charcoal. After being removed from where she was found unconscious in a smoke-filled room and given hyperbaric oxygen treatment, she regained consciousness two days later. She subsequently issued a public apology for causing concern amongst fans, a preventive measure against copycat suicides in South Korea and Japan. Hara later died by suicide in November 2019, though the method of her suicide remains publicly undisclosed.

Lee Sun-kyun, an award-winning South Korean actor, died by suicide on 27 December 2023 using this method.

On 2 February 2024, Australian–Hong Kong actor Gregory Charles Rivers died by suicide using this method.

== Prevention ==
Unrestrained dissemination by the media—which can lead to others copying the method—and easy access to charcoal in supermarkets and convenience stores has led people who might otherwise not have committed suicide to do so, with particular prominence in urban areas. Prevention strategies targeting these factors, such as the introduction of guidelines for media reporting and restricting access to charcoal, have been proposed as ways to combat suicide rates.

An intervention program conducted in New Taipei required that charcoal packages be removed from store shelves, with customers needing to request a shop assistant to retrieve them from a locked compartment. The experiment found a 37% reduction in cases of charcoal-burning suicide in the city, without a concomitant increase in other types of suicide.

As a measure to prevent further deaths, the government of Hong Kong began promoting the use of electric barbecues. Some non-governmental organizations (NGOs) worked with charcoal packers to promote the message "Cherish your life" together with suicide helpline numbers on charcoal packaging.
