= Gregory Charles Rivers =

Australian–Hong Kong actor (1965–2024)

- Rivers in 2022
- Born: April 1965; Gympie, Queensland, Australia
- Died: 2 February 2024 (aged 58); Tai Au Mun, Hong Kong
- Years active: 1988–2024
- Spouse: Bonnie Cheung (m. 1989; died 2023)

Chinese name
- Traditional Chinese: 河國榮
- Simplified Chinese: 河国荣
Transcriptions
Yue: Cantonese
- Yale Romanization: Hòh Gwok-wìhng
- Jyutping: Ho^{4} Gwok^{3}wing^{4}

Gregory Charles Rivers (April 1965 – 2 February 2024), also known by his Chinese name Ho Kwok-wing (Chinese: 河國榮; Jyutping: Ho4 Gwok3wing4), was an Australian–Hong Kong actor. He was known for his roles in various TVB series, and was dubbed "TVB's token gweilo" (white person) for his frequent appearances as stereotypical Caucasian characters.

== Early life and education ==
Rivers was born in Gympie, Queensland, in April 1965. He attended medical school at the University of New South Wales, where he became friends with students from Hong Kong who introduced him to Cantopop. He began teaching himself Cantonese by listening to Cantopop cassette tapes while reading the printed lyrics and looking up Chinese words in a dictionary.

Rivers chauffeured Cantopop singers Leslie Cheung and Alan Tam when they held concerts in Sydney during the 1980s. After dropping out from school in 1987, he moved to Hong Kong. Two weeks after he landed, he ran into some of Tam's band members and was invited to sing with him.

== Career ==
As a debutant with a modicum of Cantonese, Rivers auditioned and was chosen for a Caucasian role at Television Broadcasts Limited (TVB). Rivers adopted the Chinese name Ho Kwok-wing, the surname Ho meaning "river" and the given name Kwok-wing after his idol Leslie Cheung. He went on to become "TVB's token gweilo" (white person) for two decades.

In 2005, Rivers appeared on stage in an opera production playing the role of Teresa Teng's boyfriend.

In October 2007, Rivers was one of four non-Chinese TV actors featured in an in-depth interview and feature story titled "Hello Neighbour" in Muse, discussing his sense of cultural identity and how he viewed his work.

Rivers quipped that he was "TVB's token Caucasian for 20 years straight", having played many stereotyped roles in more than 300 dramas for TVB. Rivers' contract with TVB ended in 2007.

Rivers also worked as an English dialogue coach for Hong Kong and Chinese actors, notably Chow Yun-fat in Dragonball Evolution (2009).

In January 2016, Rivers was awarded "Best Hong Kong male singer" at the satirical "TVMost 1st Guy Ten Big Ging Cook Gum Cook Awards Distribution" (毛記電視第一屆十大勁曲金曲分獎典禮), a parody of TVB's Jade Solid Gold Best Ten Music Awards Presentation. The award was given for his song "Forever ATV" (亞視永恒), which made fun of the apparent government support for Asia Television despite its expiring broadcasting licence. In addition to "Forever ATV", Rivers also performed a parody of "Hong Kong Place" (香港地) at the ceremony, a Cantonese rap song about his love for the city.

== Personal life and death ==
Rivers married actress Bonnie Cheung in March 1989.

In 2017, Gregory was diagnosed with skin cancer after finding a swelling on the right side of his ear. He underwent surgery and remained cancer-free thereafter. In 2018, he was diagnosed with arrhythmia. His heart condition was so serious that he had to undergo two rounds of surgery, accumulating a debt of HK$800,000.

Rivers was found dead in his home in Tai Au Mun village on 2 February 2024 at the age of 58, in an apparent charcoal-burning suicide. His wife had died of illness a few months prior.
