= Po Keng Teng =

Mountain in Sai Kung District, Hong Kong

- 寶鏡頂
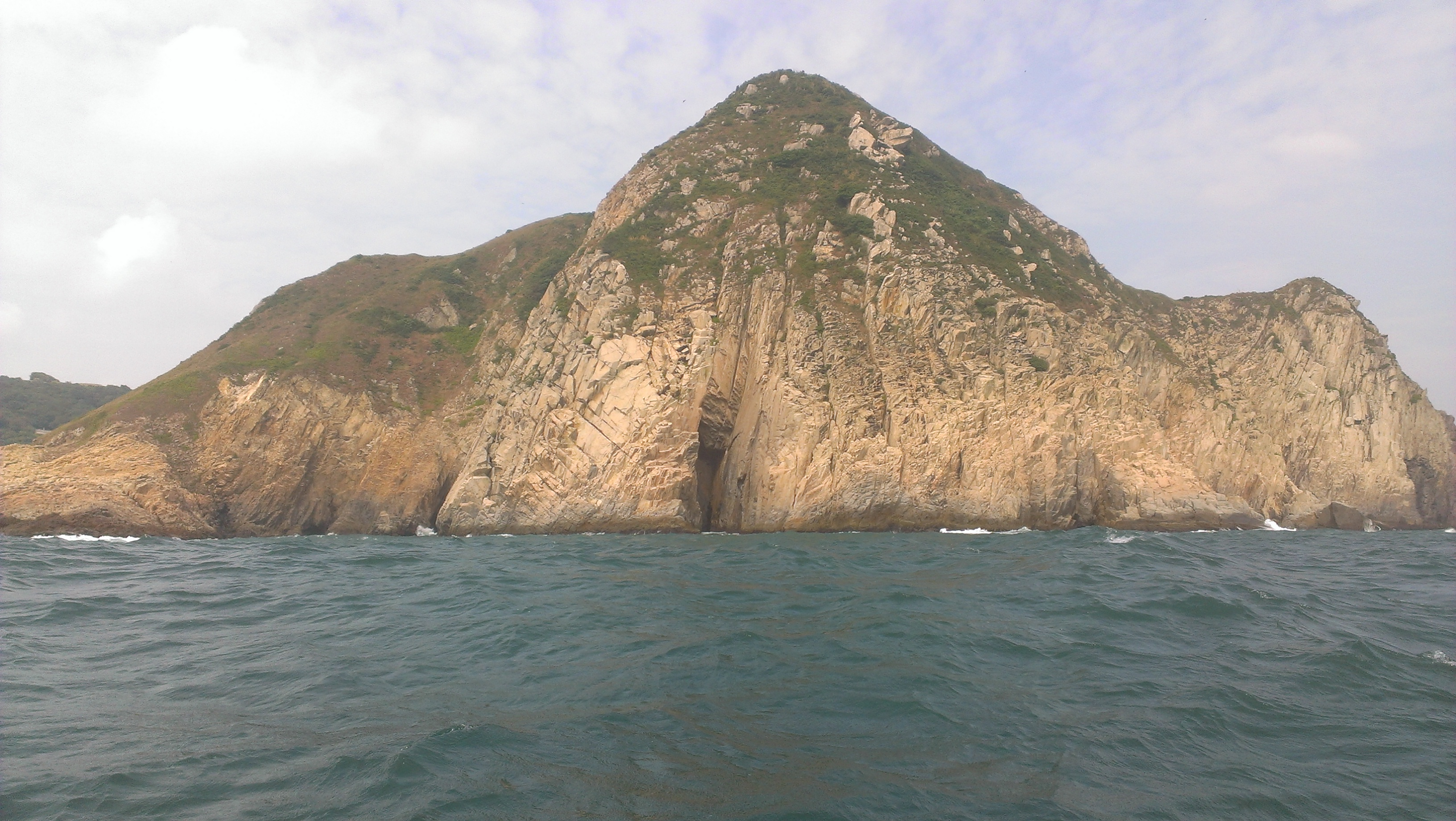
- View of Po Keng Teng in Clear Water Bay Peninsula

Highest point
- Elevation: 127 m (417 ft)
- Coordinates: 22°15′59″N 114°18′19″E

Geography
- Location within Hong Kong
- Location: Hong Kong

Po Keng Teng (Chinese: 寶鏡頂) is a mountain inside Clear Water Bay Country Park, Sai Kung, New Territories, Hong Kong, with a height of 127 metres (417 ft).

== Geography ==
Po Keng Teng is in the Clear Water Bay Peninsula region. To the west is a golf club.

There are no public roads that lead to the mountain because a private golf club separates it from the nearest public road. The trails to the summit are rather rocky, and not maintained by the government, so proper hiking footwear is advisable. The cliff on its east side is very steep.

== Geology ==
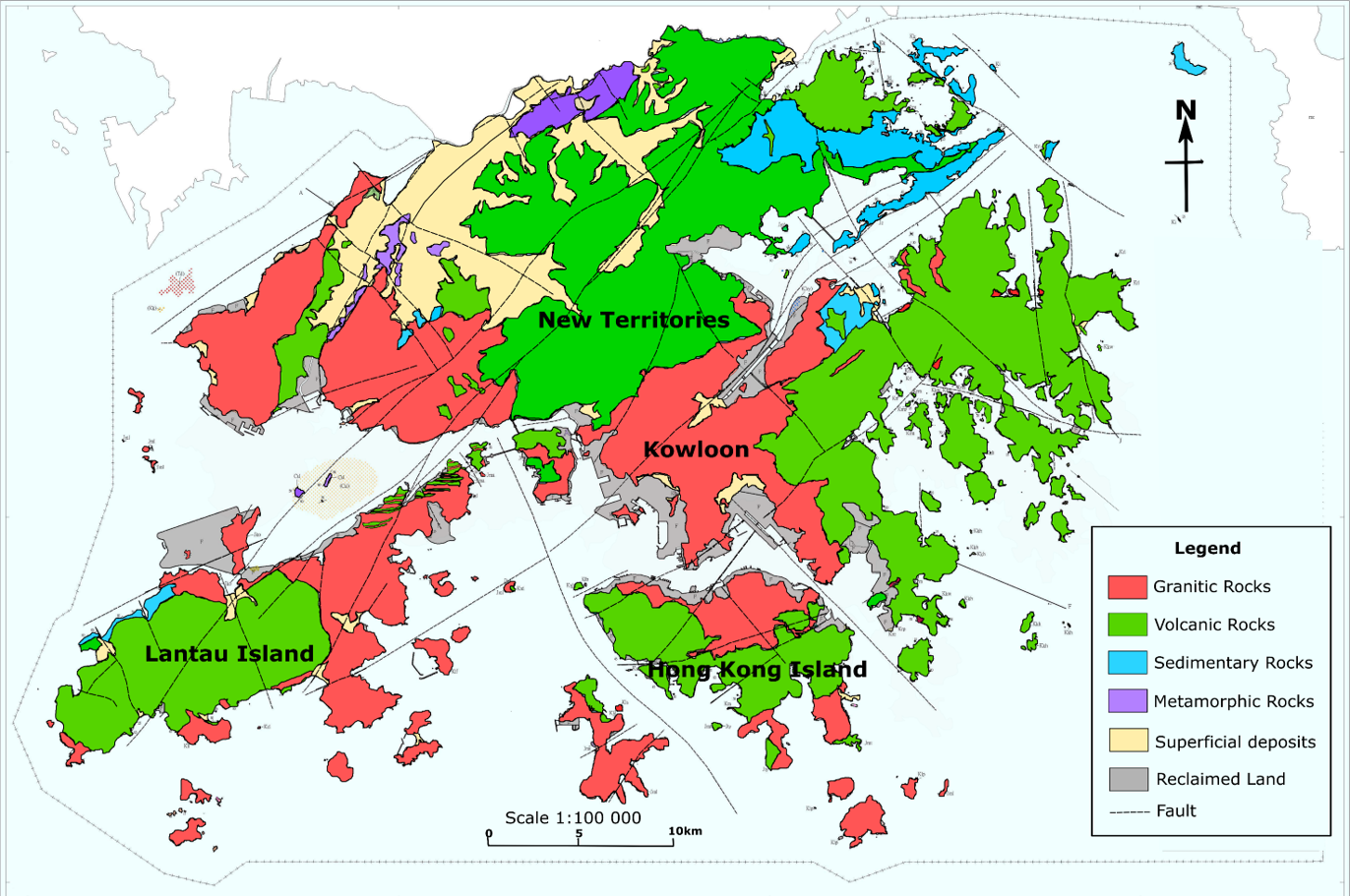
Geological map of Hong Kong showing the distribution of faults and different rock types in Hong Kong. Po Keng Teng is in the Green area (Volcanic Rock) in Eastern New Territories

Po Keng Teng is formed by volcanic rocks, like many of the tallest mountains in Hong Kong, such as Tai Mo Shan. Some shorter mountains in Hong Kong are formed by older granitic rocks.

== See also ==
- List of mountains, peaks and hills in Hong Kong
- Clear Water Bay Country Park
