= Clear Water Bay First Beach =

Beach in Clear Water Bay Peninsula, New Territories, Hong Kong

- Beach
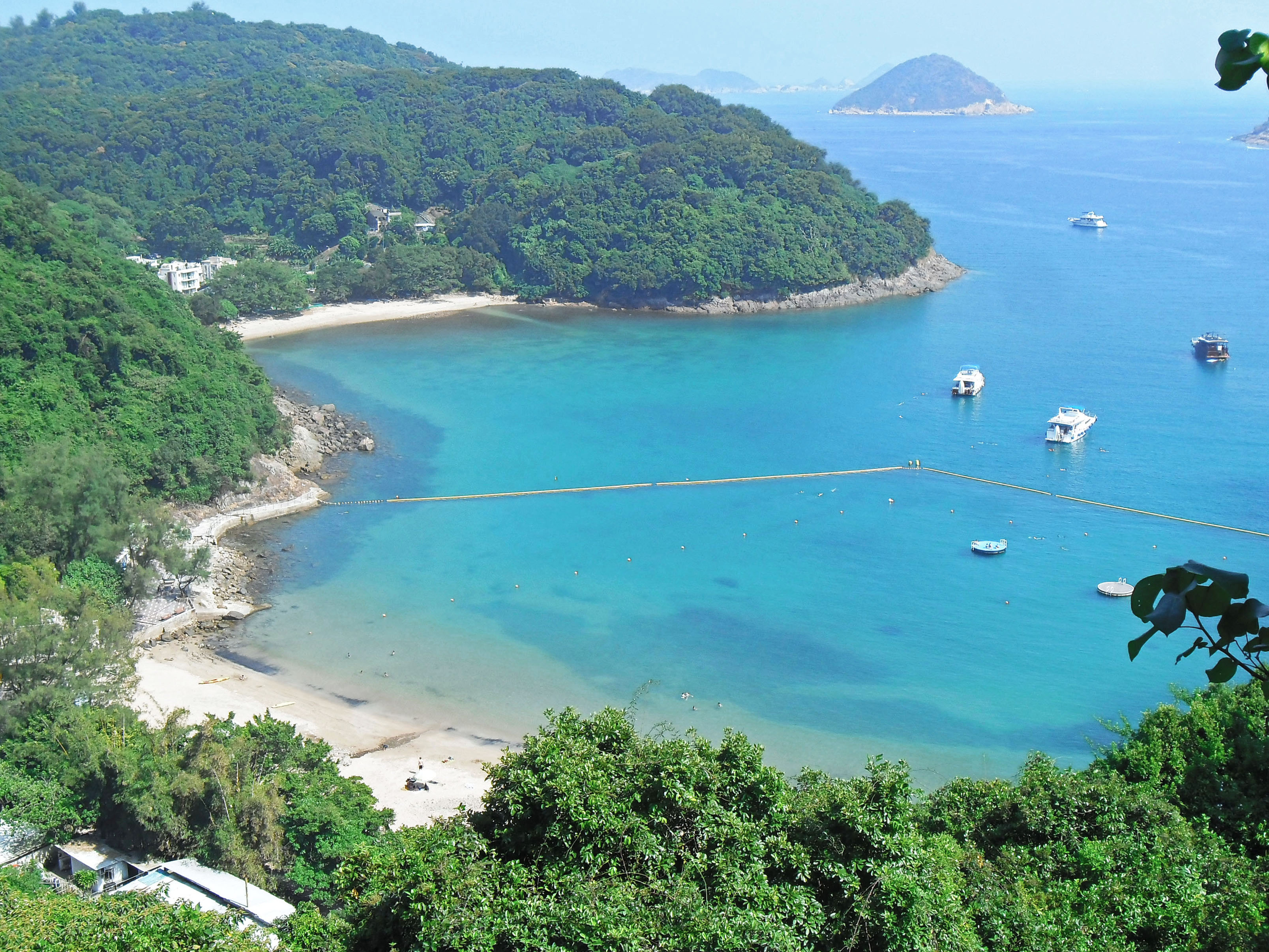
- Clear Water Bay First Beach

- Location within Hong Kong
- Coordinates: 22.29113°N 114.29107°E
- Location: Clear Water Bay Peninsula, New Territories

Dimensions
  - Length: 108 metres
- Patrolled by: Leisure and Cultural Services Department

Clear Water Bay First Beach
- Traditional Chinese: 清水灣第一灣泳灘
- Simplified Chinese: 清水湾第一湾泳滩
Transcriptions
Standard Mandarin
- Hanyu Pinyin: Qīng Shuǐ Wān Dì Yī Wān Yǒng Tān
Yue: Cantonese
- Jyutping: cing1 seoi2 waan1 dai6 jat1 waan1 wing6 taan1

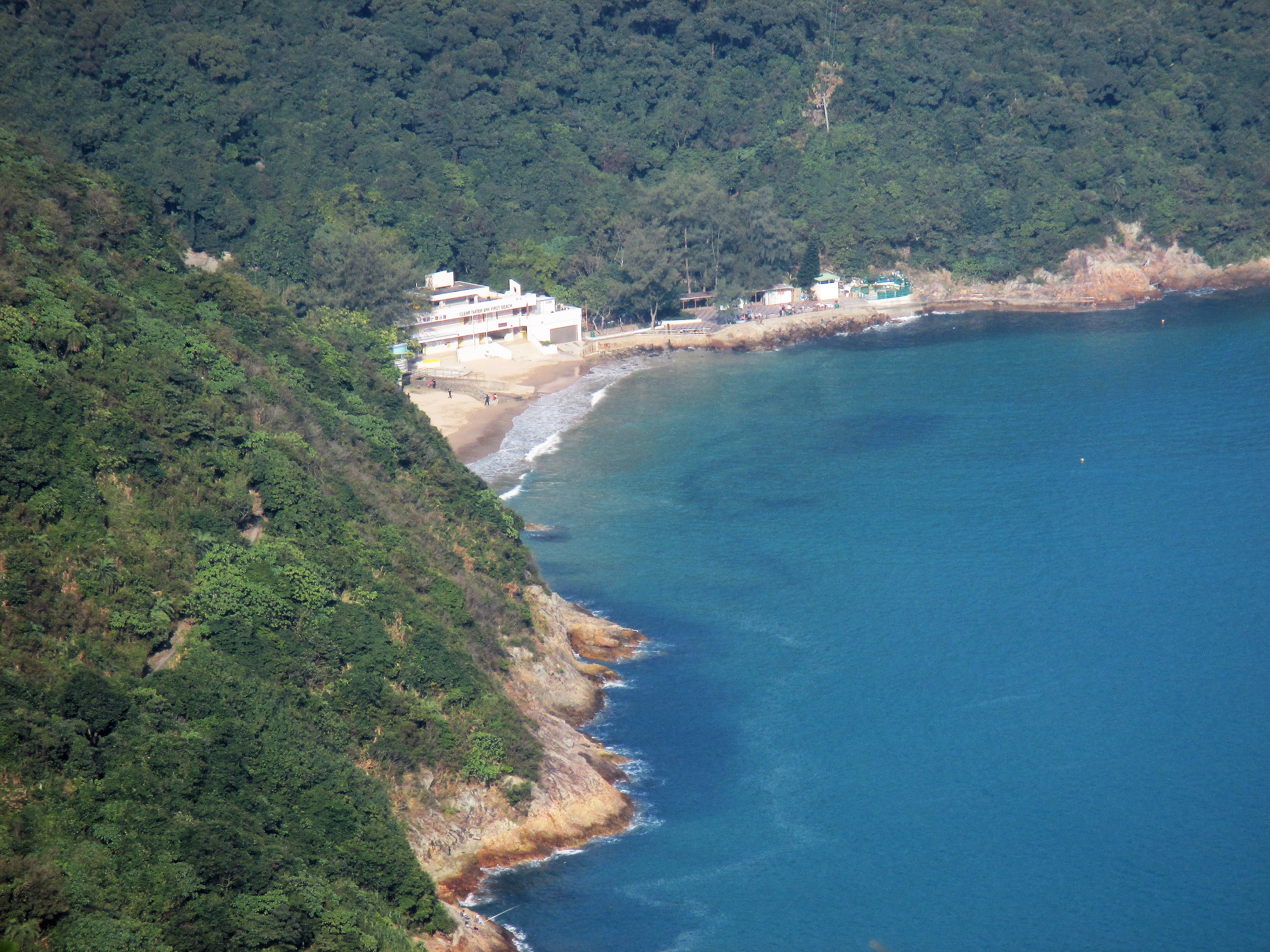
Clear Water Bay First Beach

Clear Water Bay First Beach is a gazetted beach located in the northern part of Clear Water Bay in Clear Water Bay Peninsula, Sai Kung District, Hong Kong. The beach has barbecue pits and is managed by the Leisure and Cultural Services Department of the Hong Kong Government. The beach is 108 metres long and is rated as good to fair by the Environmental Protection Department for its water quality in the past twenty years. The first and second beaches are separated by a short stretch of rocky coast and an interconnecting footpath.

== History ==
On 13 June 1995, a 49-year-old woman Wong Kui-Yong (王桂容) had her left forearm and left leg bitten off by a shark at the beach. She died of her injuries.

On 20 September 2020, a 37-year-old foreign woman went into a coma on a yacht opposite the beach following water activities. She was pronounced dead after being sent to the hospital by a helicopter.

== Usage ==
The beach tends to be smaller and is less frequently visited than the Clear Water Bay Second Beach.

== Features ==
The beach has the following features:

- BBQ pits (15 nos.)
- Changing rooms
- Showers
- Toilets
- Water sports centre

== See also ==
- Beaches of Hong Kong
- Tai Wan Tau, a nearby village located in the northeast of the beach
