= Ha Yeung =

Village in Hong Kong

Coordinates: 22.304332°N 114.286545°E

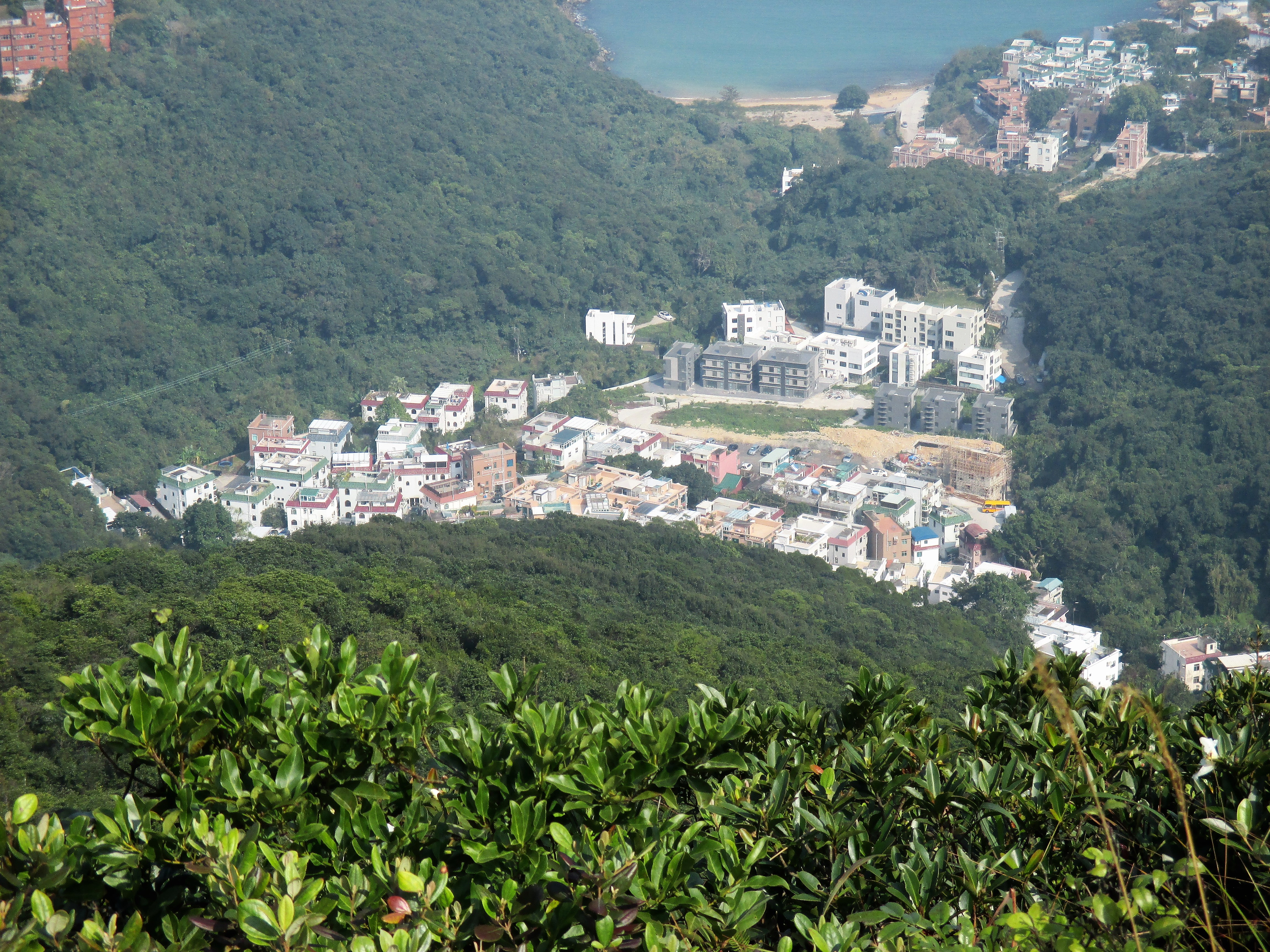
Ha Yeung viewed from High Junk Peak Country Trail.

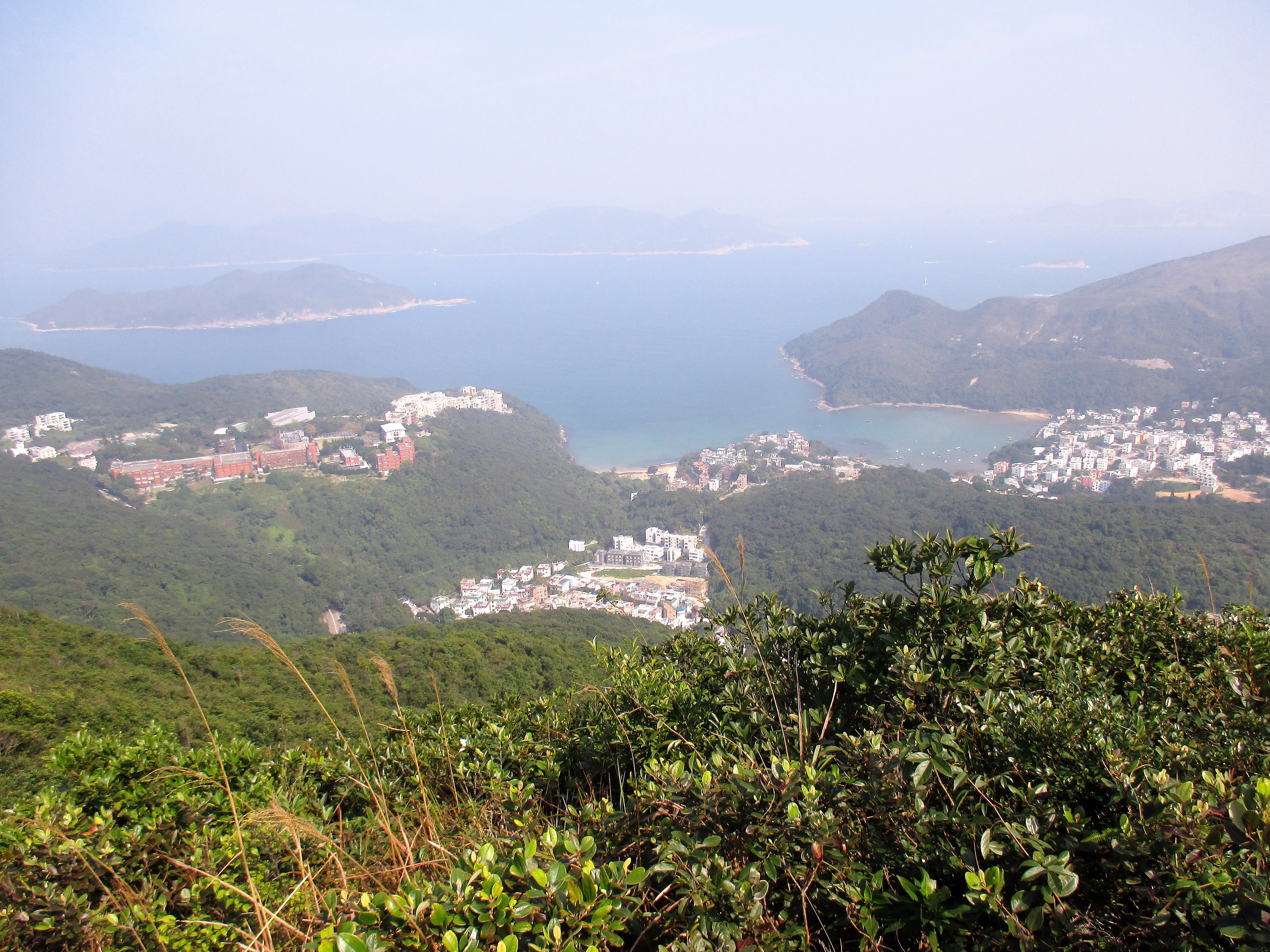
Ha Yeung, Sheung Sze Wan and other villages.

Ha Yeung (Chinese: 下洋) is a village in Sai Kung District, New Territories, Hong Kong.

== Administration ==
Ha Yeung, including Mau Po (茅莆) and Siu Hang Hau (小坑口), is a recognized village under the New Territories Small House Policy.

== See also ==
- Sheung Sze Wan
