= Three Sharp Peaks of Hong Kong =

Sharp Peak
- 蚺蛇尖
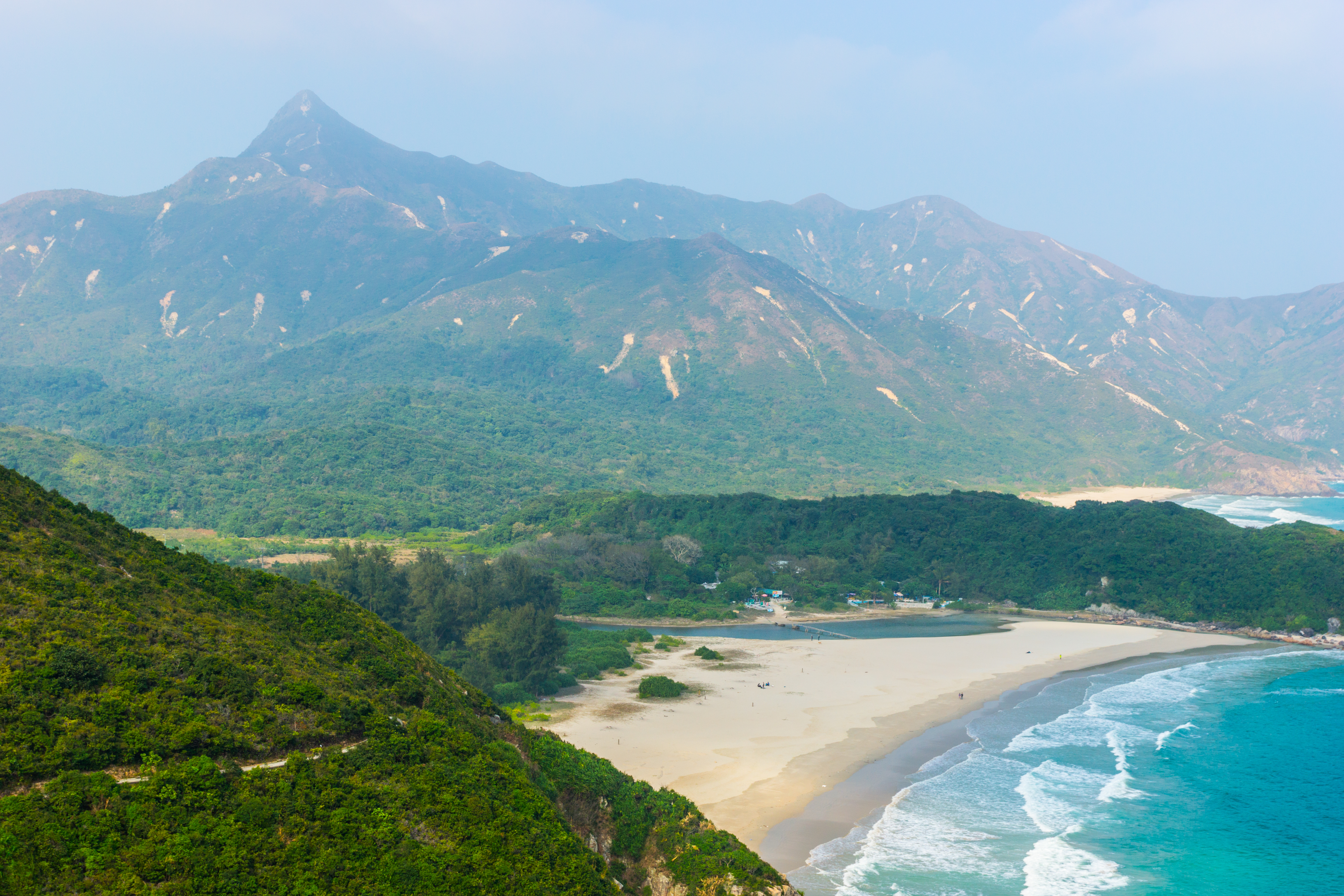
- Sharp Peak, rising in the background above Ham Tin Wan beach.

Highest point
- Elevation: 468 m (1,535 ft)
- Coordinates: 22°25′51″N 114°22′33″E

Geography
- Location within Hong Kong
- Location: Eastern New Territories, Hong Kong

Castle Peak, Hong Kong
- 青山
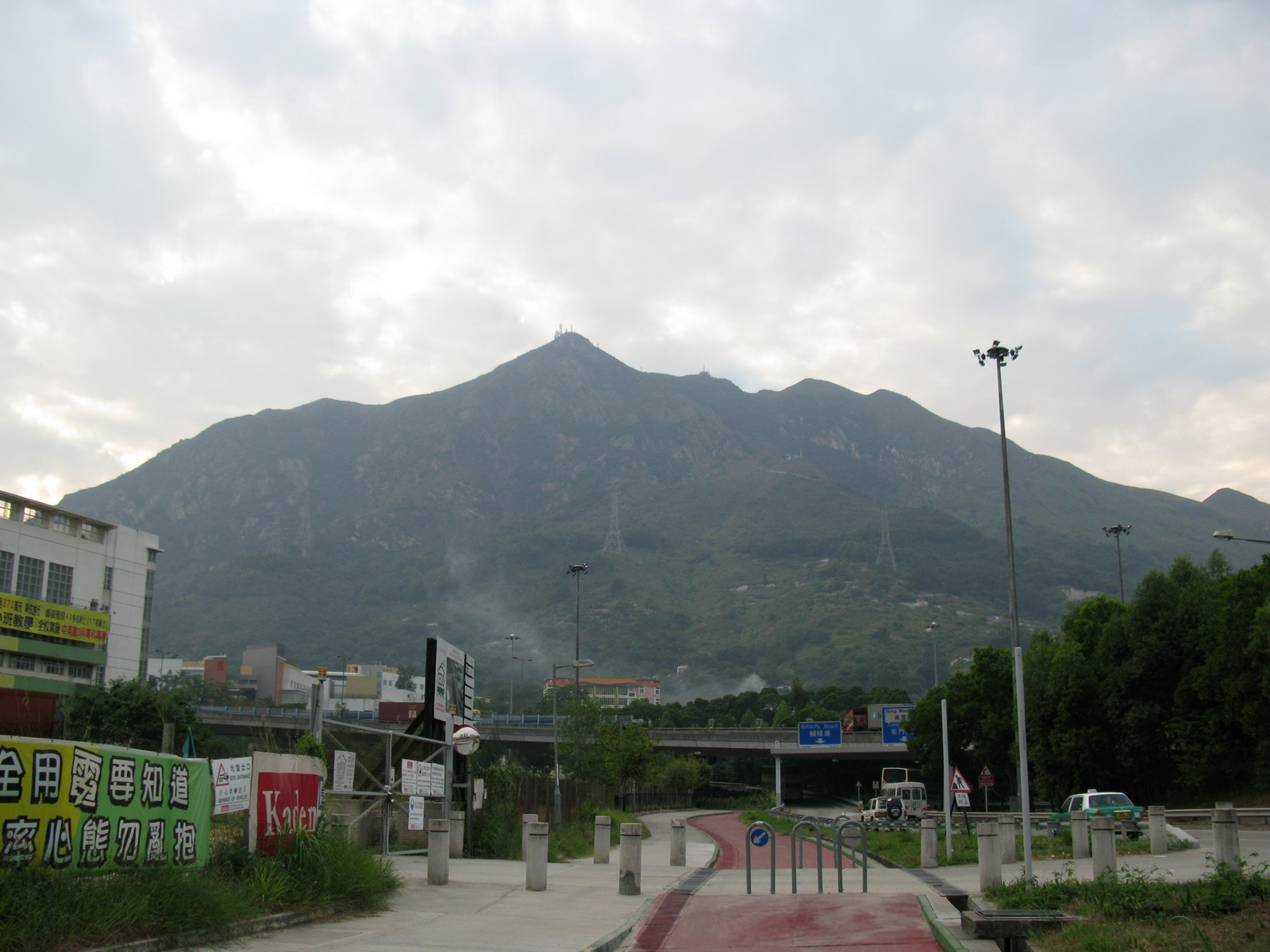
- View of Castle Peak

Highest point
- Elevation: 583 m (1,913 ft)
- Coordinates: 22°23′18.35″N 113°57′11.63″E

Geography
- Location within Hong Kong
- Location: Hong Kong

High Junk Peak, Hong Kong
- 釣魚翁
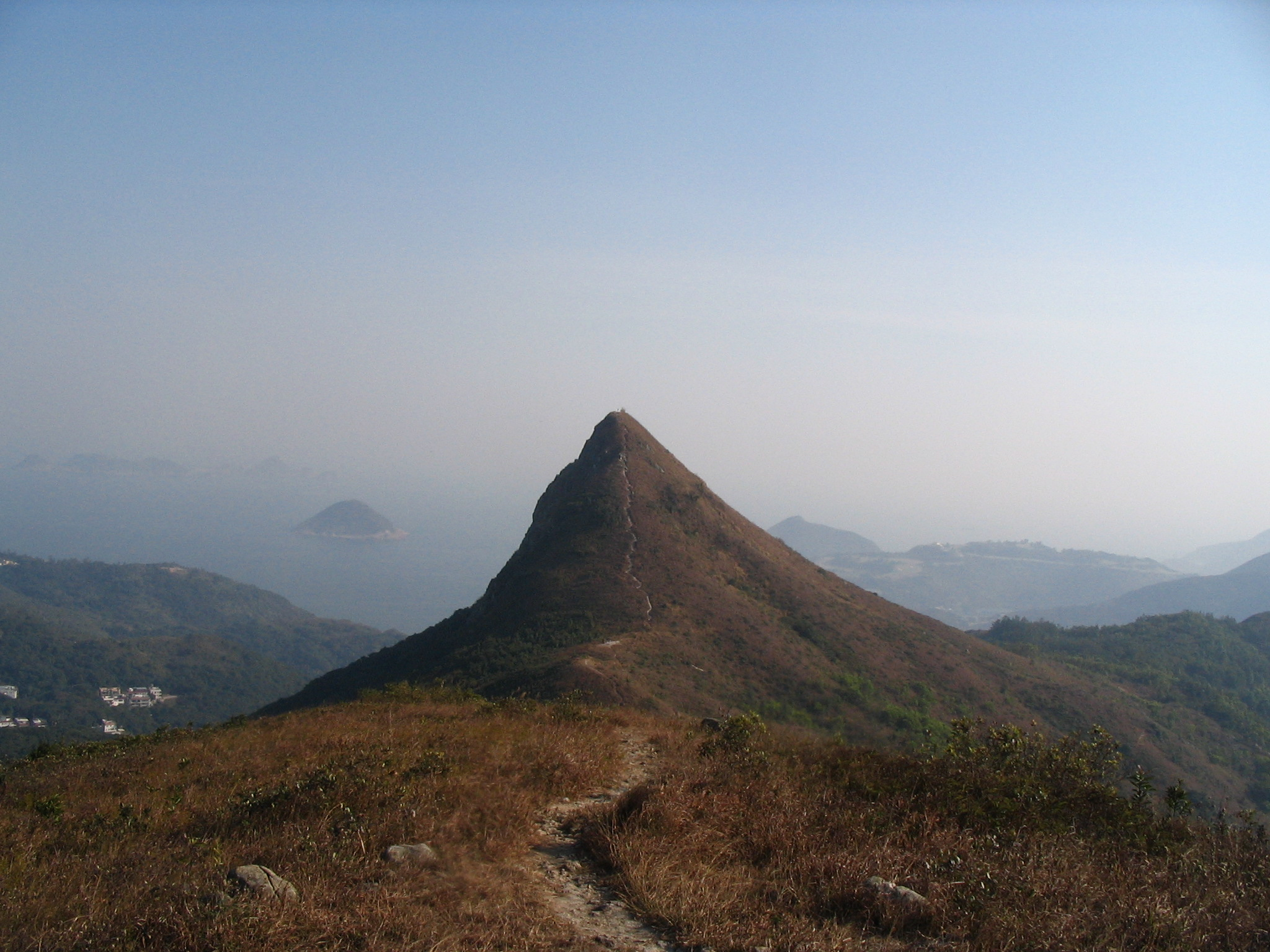
- View of High Junk Peak from Miu Tsai Tun

Highest point
- Elevation: 344 m (1,129 ft)
- Coordinates: 22°17′44.9″N 114°17′9.02″E

Geography
- Location within Hong Kong
- Location: Hong Kong

The Three Sharp Peaks of Hong Kong (Chinese: 香港三尖) are a collection of three peaks that Hong Kong hikers deem as very challenging to summit because of loose rocks and steep inclination. The peaks are Castle Peak (583m) in Tuen Mun, Sharp Peak (468m) in Sai Kung and High Junk Peak (344m) in Clear Water Bay. The three peaks are scattered in different regions in Hong Kong. While Castle Peak is the tallest of the three, Sharp Peak is generally considered the hardest of the three to hike up because of its remoteness and steepness.

== Three Sharp Peaks of Sai Kung ==
Hikers also have another list of three peaks called the Three Sharp Peaks of Sai Kung (District), a popular hiking spot in Hong Kong. They are the aforementioned Sharp Peak, High Junk Peak and the remote Tai Yue Ngam Teng (233m) peak.

== See also ==
- List of mountains, peaks and hills in Hong Kong
- Castle Peak
- Sharp Peak
- High Junk Peak
