= Miu Tsai Tun =

Miu Tsai Tun, Hong Kong
- 廟仔墩
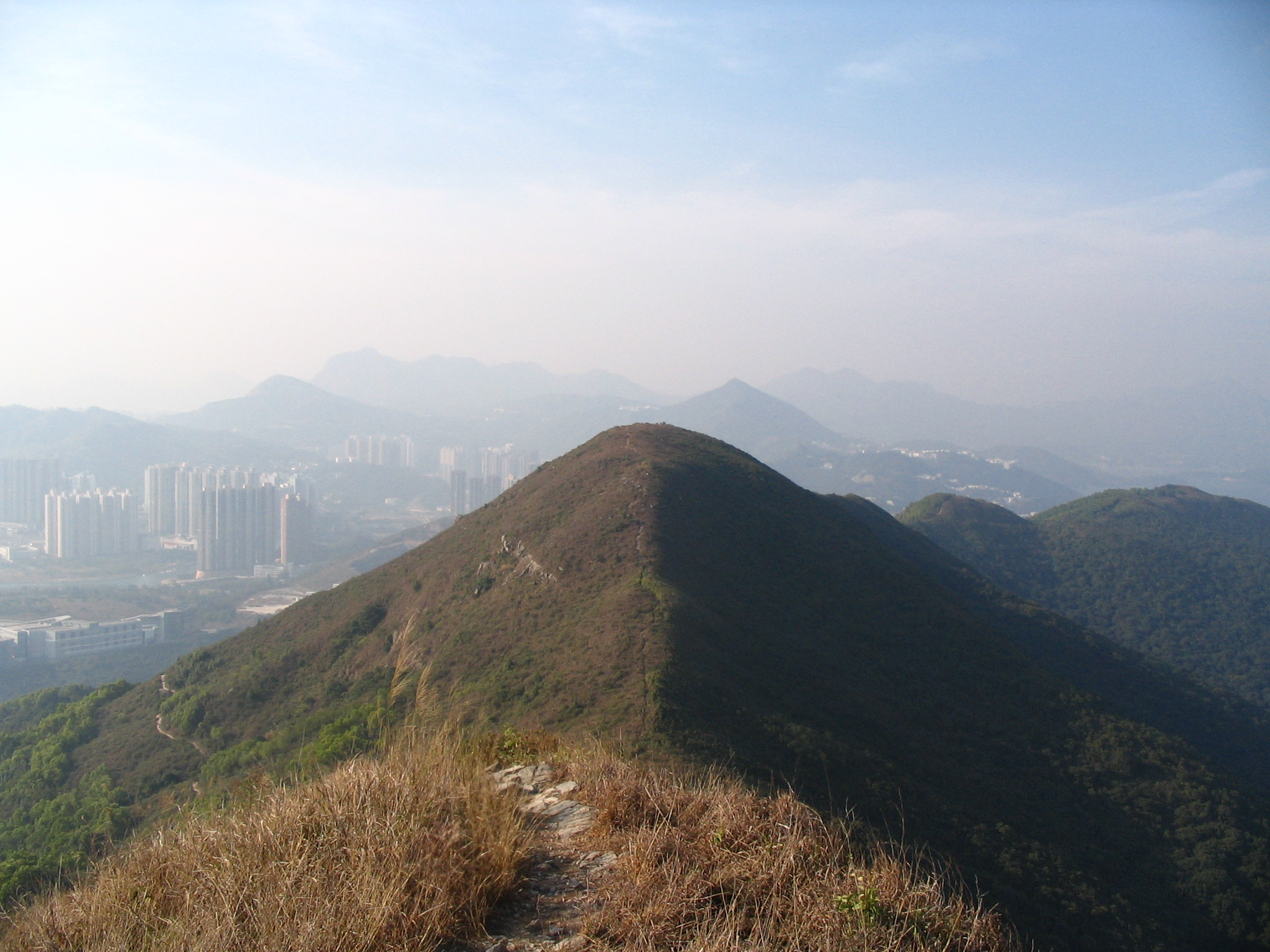
- View of Miu Tsai Tun from High Junk Peak

Highest point
- Elevation: 333 m (1,093 ft)
- Coordinates: 22°17′57.91″N 114°16′56.77″E

Geography
- Location within Hong Kong
- Location: Hong Kong

Miu Tsai Tun (Chinese: 廟仔墩) is a mountain that lies within Clear Water Bay Country Park, Hong Kong. Its name in Chinese means "Small Temple Mound" because there is a small temple on the northeast side of the mountain.

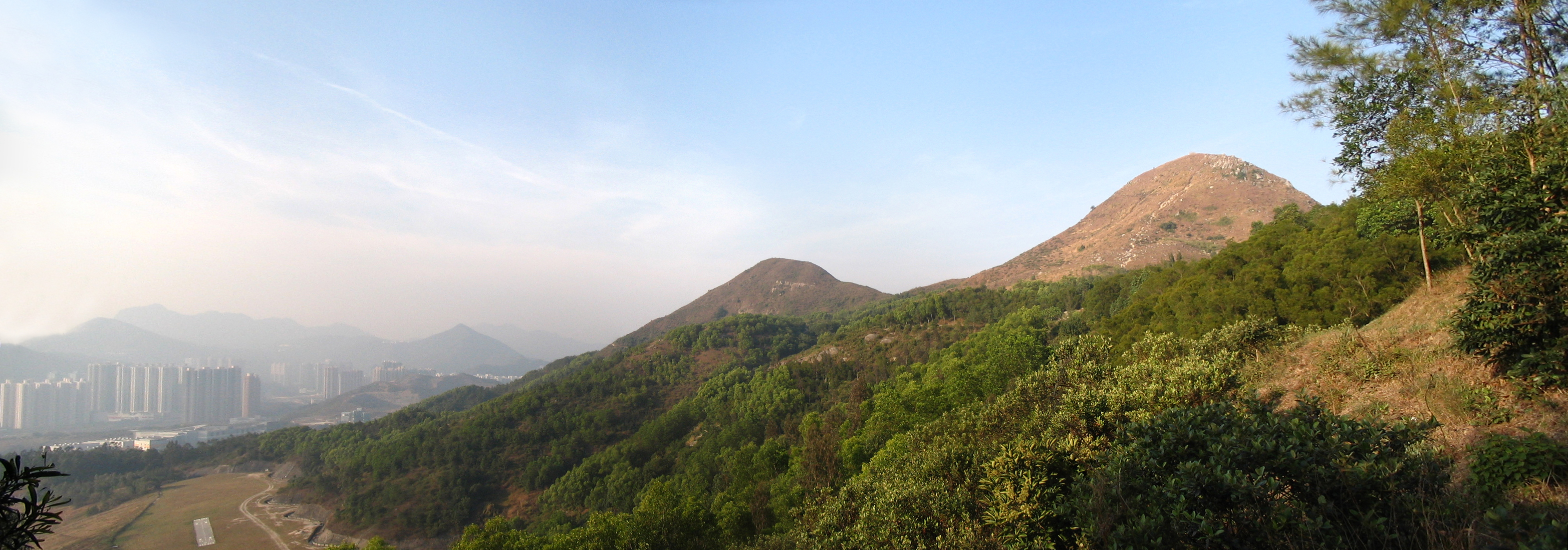
Miu Tsai Tun (middle) and nearby High Junk Peak (right)

== Geography ==
Miu Tsai Tun is 333m in height. To the south lies a famous mountain called High Junk Peak.

== Access ==
The High Junk Peak Country Trail runs through the foot of Miu Tsai Tun, west of the summit. It is possible to access the summit of Miu Tsai Tun from entrances on the High Junk Peak Country Trail. The path to the summit is rather rugged and not maintained by the government, so proper footwear is advisable.

== See also ==
- List of mountains, peaks and hills in Hong Kong
- High Junk Peak
- Clear Water Bay Country Park
