= Suicide of Taipei First Girls' High School students (1994) =

Dual suicide in 1994

The suicide of two Taipei First Girls' High School students (Chinese: 1994年北一女中學生自殺事件) happened in Yilan County, Taiwan in 1994. The two school girls were called Lin Qinghui (Chinese: 林青慧) and Shi Jiya (Chinese: 石濟雅), Grade 2. They went together to a motel in Su'ao Town, Yilan County and committed suicide by burning charcoal with insufficient ventilation. Their bodies as well as the suicide note were found by the motel staff at noon on 25 July 1994. The staff then called the police. The suicide of the two school girls was one of the biggest social news events of the year in Taiwan. There was no clue found about the motivation of the suicides in the suicide note. Their parents also thought they had no reason to do so. News media once speculated that the tragedy resulted from the complex feelings of being lesbians. A respondent claimed in an interview that they saw handwriting that looked like they belonged to the two girls on the walls of the third floor of the school’s gymnasium, that was referred to by the students as “a good place to have a date”. The writing allegedly said, “This society does not allow things like this to happen, my feelings for you are deep, but this society does not allow it.”

== Background ==
Lin Qinghui (18-year-old, Taipei County, Xinzhuang City) and Shi Jiya (17-year-old, Taipei City) were second year students at Taipei First Girls' High School. They were both in a gifted science class called the Liang (14th) class. Jiya Shi was the conductor of the school orchestra and had a good academic record. The school planned on sending her to participate in the International Mathematical Olympiad. Qinghui Lin was a member of the school basketball team and also a talented chemistry student. The two girls were good friends and planned to undertake individual studies with professors of Chemistry and Mathematics at National Taiwan University over the upcoming holiday.

On 23 July 1994, the two girls left home for Jindu Motel in front of Su'ao Station of Yilan County. At noon on 25 July, the motel staff found their bodies in the bathroom together with a suicide note. When Liao Songyun, the prosecutor, and Dong Xirong, the medical examiner of Yilan District Prosecutors Office, came to the spot, they found burned charcoal in the bathroom; the door and window had been sealed. There was no sign of a struggle or poison. They died of carbon monoxide poisoning and asphyxia. The prosecutor deduced that the two girls committed suicide together late at night on 23 July.

== Suicide note ==
The suicide note was written by both girls in three paragraphs.

My dear family:

Please don't be sad when you read this letter. We have thought about this decision for a long time. The reasons why we choose to leave the world behind are complicated. I hope the following words may provide some insight. It has been so hard to be a human being. The setback or pressure that has defeated us is beyond most people's imagination, and there is even no place for us in this society. We feel it so difficult to deal with daily life. More often, we succumb to depression. Life is worthless, so is death. With a peaceful mind, we finish this letter. (Written by Lin Qinghui)

Please burn all my belongings, including the bill, or send them to others. Candies and Prophet in the classroom were from Xiuwei(Chinese: 秀薇) and Lifen(Chinese: 麗芬). Please give those back to them. (Written by Shi Jiya)

Please find in my room all the letters and diaries in the big drawer and the second right drawer of my desk (with the computer on), and in the closed cupboard, and burn them all. Except the basketball, which I would like to remain in my room, I would like to leave all other belongings to my brother, and hope he can work hard with a faithful heart. If the soul truly exists after I die, I would always remember you all and deliver you my best wishes. (Written by Lin Qinghui)

== Cultural references ==
Yang Jo-hui (twin sister of the current holder of pen name Yang Shuang-zi), an ACG researcher thought that Lianfang Shen's yuri comic book Always Be with You, published in 1997, drew inspiration from the suicide case in question.
