= Clear Water Bay Country Park =

Country park in the New Territories, Hong Kong

Coordinates: 22.298°N 114.304°E

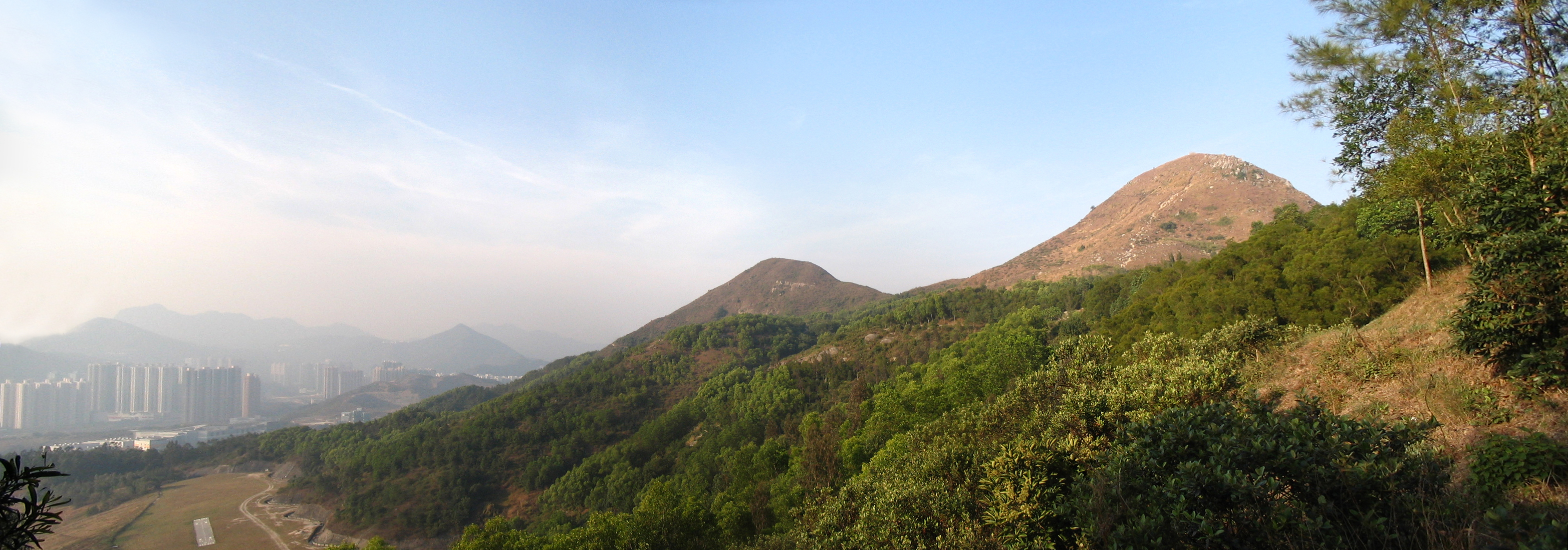
Miu Tsai Tun and High Junk Peak

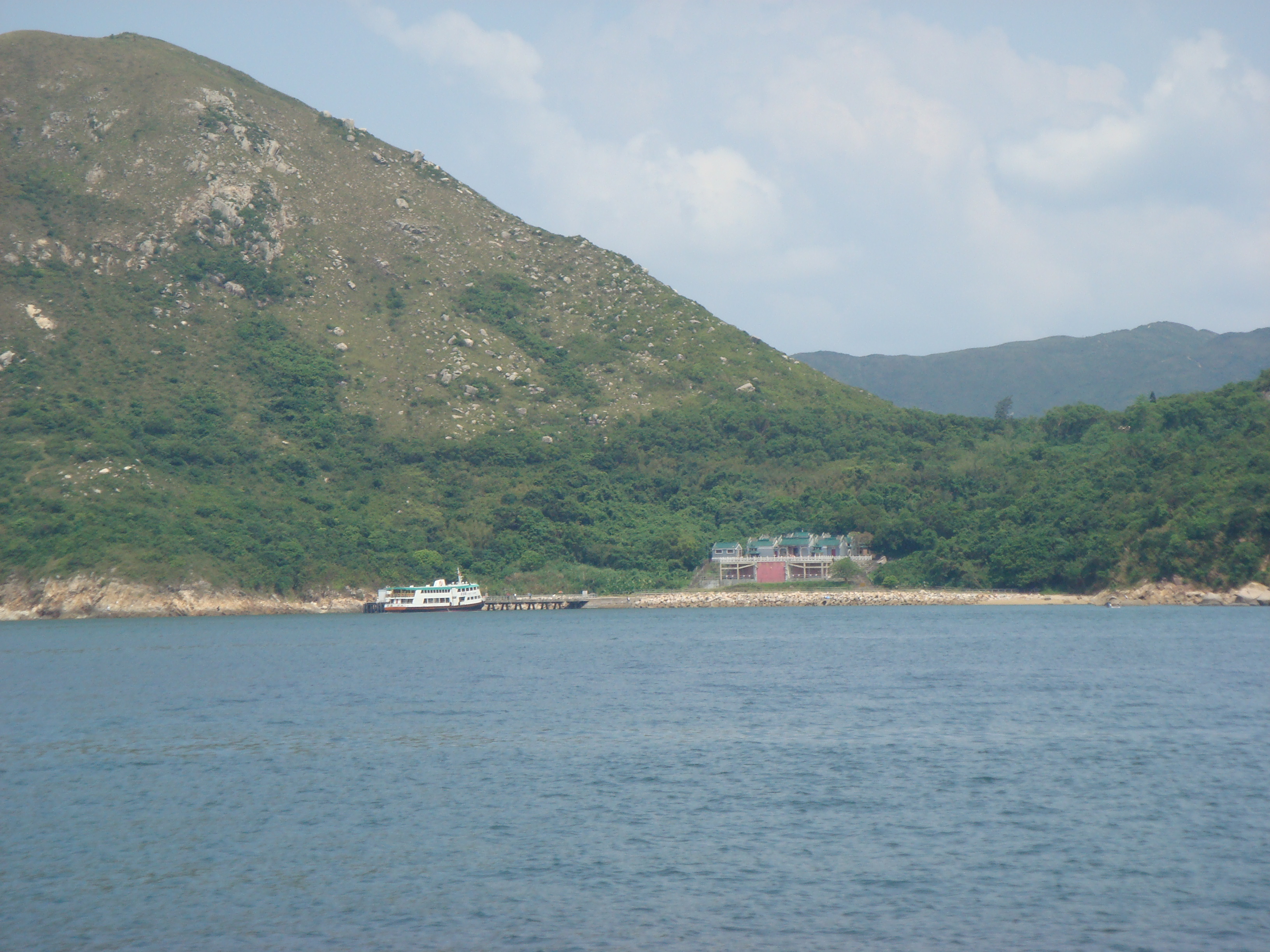
Distant view of the Tin Hau Temple in Fat Tong Mun, Joss House Bay. The hill on the left is Tin Ha Shan.

Clear Water Bay Country Park is a rural country park in the New Territories of eastern Hong Kong. The park is located near the beaches in Clear Water Bay. The 6.15 square kilometre park opened on 28 September 1979. Its features include:

- High Junk Peak
- Miu Tsai Tun
- Tin Hau Temple in Fat Tong Mun, Joss House Bay
- Clear Water Bay First Beach
- Clear Water Bay Tree Walk
- Clear Water Bay Golf Course
- Lung Ha Wan Country Trail

A designated hiking trail begins on Clear Water Bay Road near Tseung Kwan O and ends near the Clearwater Bay golf course.
