= Tai Wan Tau =

Village in Hong Kong

Coordinates: 22.290855°N 114.294757°E

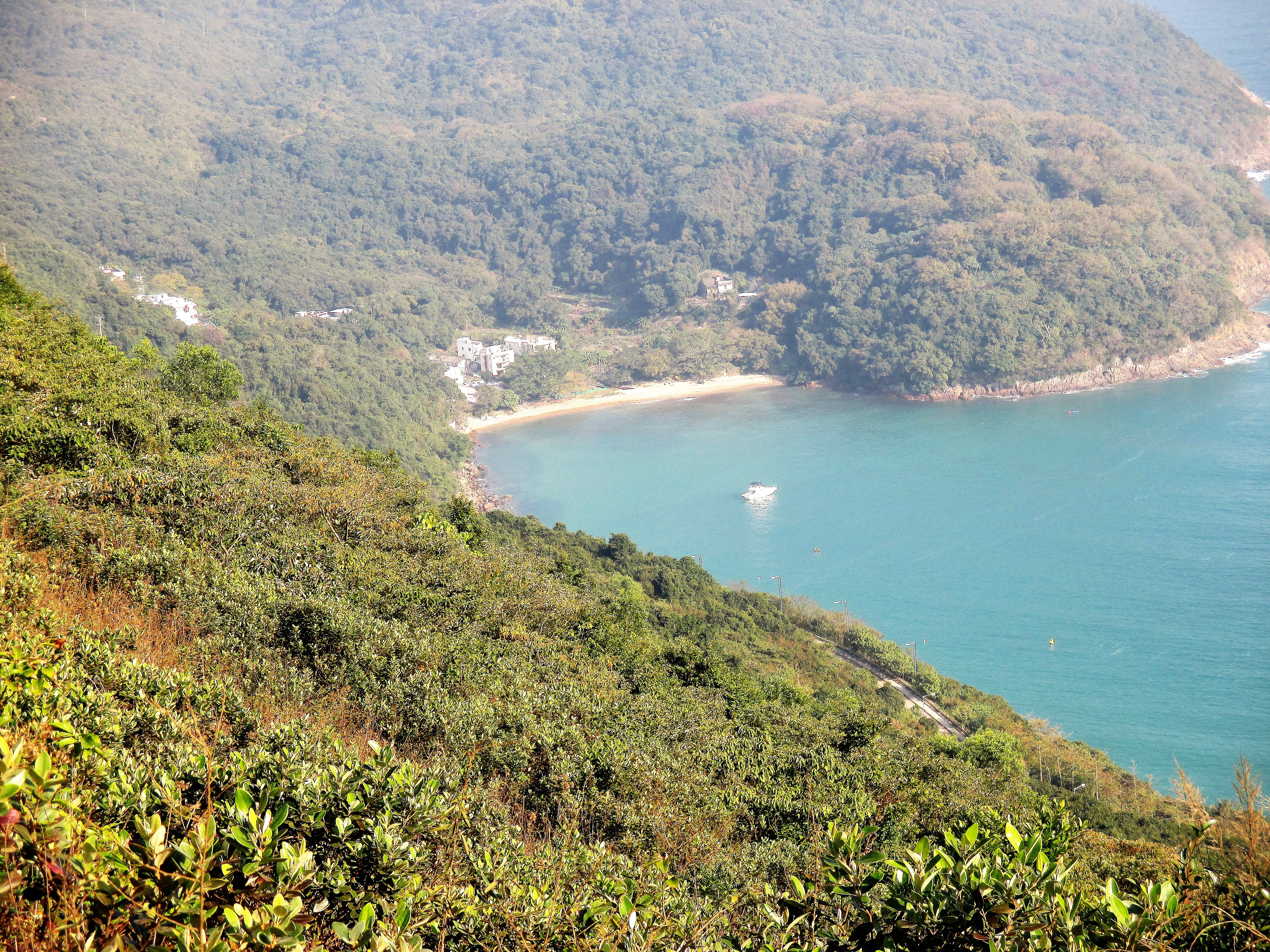
Distant view of Tai Wan Tau.

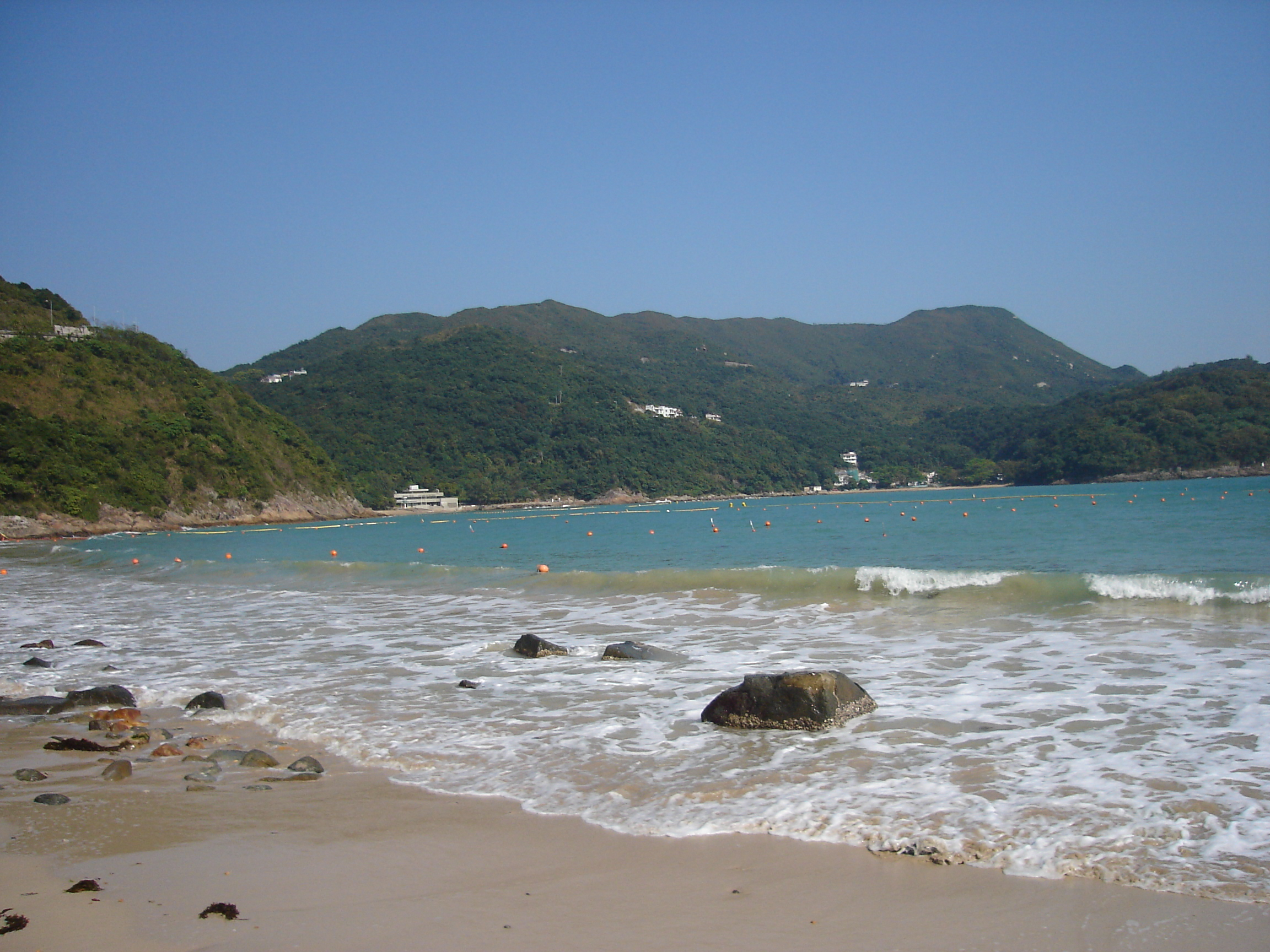
Distant view of Tai Wan Tau from Clear Water Bay Second Beach. The hill in the background is Tai Leng Tung.

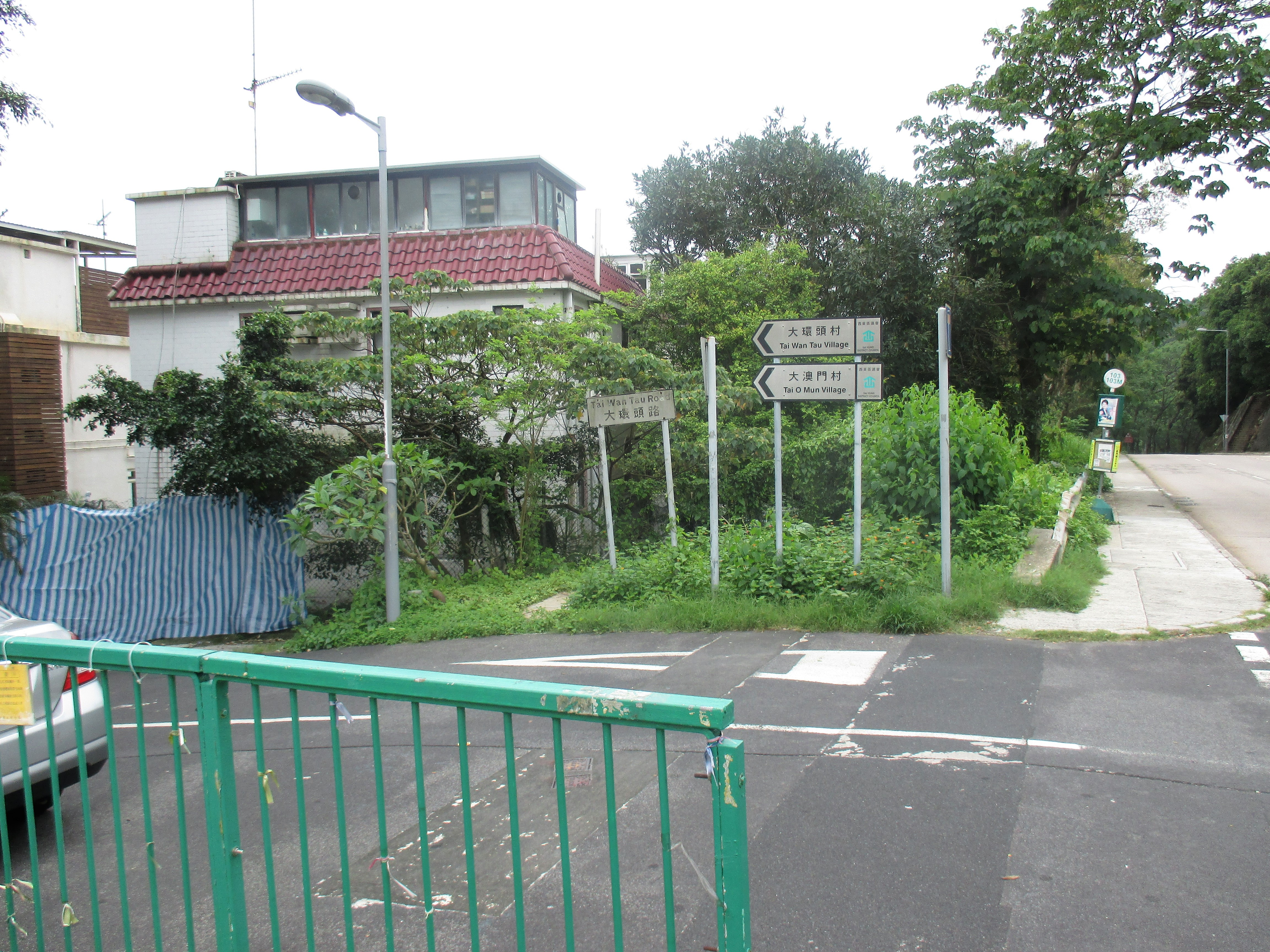
Road sign to Tai Wan Tau near Tai Au Mun (大坳門).

Tai Wan Tau (Chinese: 大環頭) is a village on Clear Water Bay, in the Sai Kung District of Hong Kong.

== Geography ==
Tai Wan Tau is a small village close to the sea, in the northeast of Clear Water Bay Second Beach. The Tai Leng Tung hill is located at the back of the village.

== Administration ==
Tai Wan Tau (including Tai Au Mun) is a recognized village under the New Territories Small House Policy.

== History ==
The village was established during the reign of the Wanli Emperor (1572-1620). It was established by members of the Lau (劉) and Chow (鄒) clans. Many of the members later moved to the nearby village of Tai Au Mun (大坳門), in the northwest. The Laus historically engaged in fishing and rice growing.

At the time of the 1911 census, the population of Tai Wan Tau was 117. The number of males was 53.

== Features ==
An ancestral hall of the Laus is located in the village. The house at No. 23 Tai Wan Tau, built before 1907 and rebuilt in 1949, is a Chinese Eclectic style building.
