= Hong Kong Adventist College =

College in Hong Kong

Coordinates: 22°18′26″N 114°17′09″E

- 香港三育書院
- Motto: Strive for Excellence
- Type: Private
- Established: 1903
- Affiliations: Andrews University, Kettering College, La Sierra University, Pacific Union College, Southern Adventist University, Walla Walla University, Southwestern Adventist University, Union adventist university
- President: Frank Wai-ming Tam, B.Sc., M.Sc., M.Phil., Ph.D.
- Vice-president: Hosea Yeung, MBA, CPA, CGA
- Dean: Barbara Choi Kit Chun, B.SC nursing, MPH, Dr. PH
- Location: Hong Kong
- Website: www.hkac.edu

Hong Kong Adventist College
- Traditional Chinese: 香港三育書院
- Simplified Chinese: 香港三育书院
Transcriptions
Standard Mandarin
- Hanyu Pinyin: Xiānggǎng Sān Yù Shūyuàn
Yue: Cantonese
- Jyutping: hoeng1 gong2 saam1 juk6 syu1 jyun6*2

Hong Kong Adventist College (HKAC) is a co-educational institution of higher learning located in Sai Kung District, New Territories, Hong Kong. The college is owned and operated by the Seventh-day Adventist Church.

It is a part of the Seventh-day Adventist education system, the world's second largest Christian school system.

== History ==
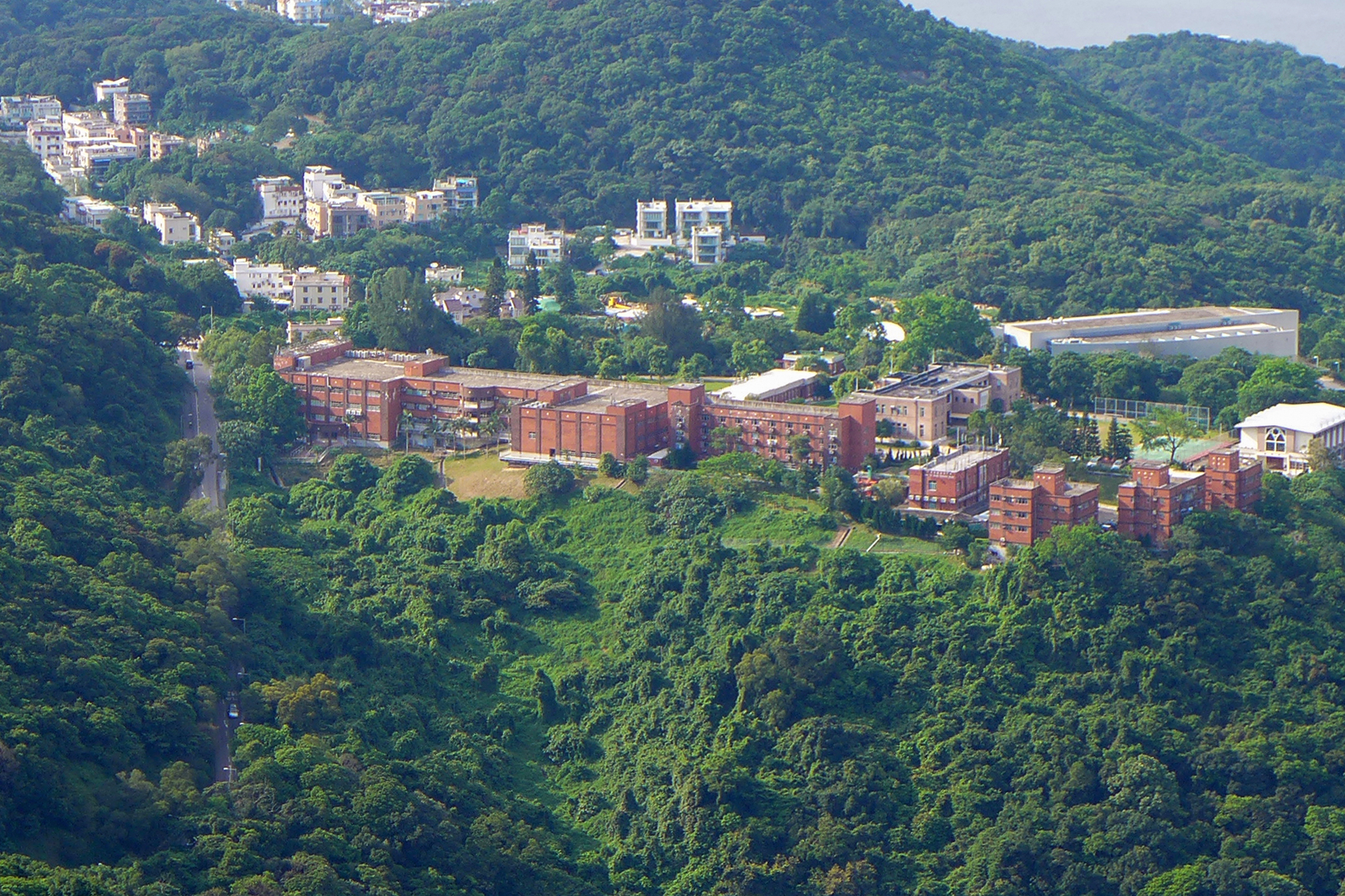
Hong Kong Adventist College

Seventh-day Adventists first began the educational work in China in the southern part of mainland China. In 1903, the church operating in Guangzhou founded its first school. This girls school was called “The Bethel Girls’ School”. In 1905, the church established "Yick Chi Boys’ School." In 1911, the Yick Chi Boys' School was closed and re-opened as a middle school five years later as “Sam Yuk School". The Sam Yuk School grew and became successful. As a result, land was purchased in the eastern part of the Guangdong city (Canton) to meet the rapid growth of the school. In 1922, the buildings were erected. When the buildings were ready for use, the Bethel Girls’ School was integrated as a part of Sam Yuk School. The new school served the Guangzhou, Hakka, and Guangxi Missions in the South China region. In 1935, the South China Union Mission took charge of the Sam Yuk School and renamed it the “Canton Training Institute.”

In 1937 the Sino-Japanese War broke out, plunging China into turmoil. To remain in operation, the school was moved to Hong Kong and temporarily operated in Shatin. At that time the school was renamed as the "South China Training Institute". Later, the "China Training Institute" (Junior College), another Adventist education institution from central China, was also moved to the same premise. The two schools were merged to form the “China and South China Training Institute.” Soon after, a piece of land consisting of 40 acres (160,000 m^{2}) was purchased at Clear Water Bay Peninsula in the New Territories. Development for a permanent campus began and after two years, the campus buildings were completed, with the school in Shatin soon arriving.

In 1939, World War II erupted, bringing the people of Hong Kong under Japanese occupation in 1941. As a result, the school reverted to its prior name of "South China Training Institute" and moved back to Mainland China near the town of Laolung in Guangdong province. After the war ended, the abandoned campus in Clear Water Bay was managed by the colonial British army. To continue the long suspended education work, the school was relocated back to its former site in the district of Tungshan in Guangdong for a year. It was not until 1947 that the school was able to move back to the Clear Water Bay campus.

In 1958, the now defunct Far Eastern Division of Seventh-day Adventists authorised the South China Island Union Mission to open a college for providing tertiary education. It was planned that the middle school be incorporated into the Clear Water Bay campus. The college was launched in 1962. Two years later, the name of the school, which had combined the secondary and tertiary education, was officially changed to “South China Union College.”

In 1981, the constituency of the South China Island Union Mission officially adopted the name "Hong Kong Adventist College" to identify the school as an independent entity separated from Sam Yuk Middle School. This was followed by the registration and approval of Hong Kong Adventist College by the Hong Kong Department of Education.

The college's enrolment increased steadily. The campus facilities, degrading as time passed, were soon in urgent need of renovation. As a result, the board of directors decided in 1989 to press ahead a major redevelopment plan for the college. It was decided that lands located in the hillside would be sold to the Cheung Kong (Holdings) Limited for pooling a source of income for the redevelopment project. The hilltop was maintained to be the landmark of the campus site. New campus facilities were launched in 1997.

In 2011, the college resumed instruction at the Hong Kong Adventist Academy, a primary and secondary school located on its campus.

In 2022, Hong Kong Adventist Academy composed its new school song after over 10 years, composed by teachers Bart Brondo, Dean Kravig, and Alex Podbreszkis.

== Overseas degree programs ==
The college has worked with Andrews University and La Sierra University to offer a 2+2 degree program for students wishing to gain extra benefits from these institutions since 2016. Both universities offer bachelor's degree programs ranging from Accounting to Wellness. Students who enroll in this 2+2 degree program are entitled to a scholarship of up to 50% during their last two years in the United States. Through this program, students can develop their language skills and get a better insight into university learning when studying in Hong Kong for the first two years.

== Local degree programs ==
In affiliation with Andrews University, the college also offers local bachelor's degree programs to students. If students prefer to study in Hong Kong, there are several programs available.

- Bachelor of Science in Psychology
- Bachelor of Health Science in Wellness (With an Emphasis on Fitness)
- Bachelor of Arts in Religion
- Associate of Science in General Business
- Diploma in Pre-University Studies (Offered by Hong Kong Adventist College)

== See also ==
- List of Seventh-day Adventist colleges and universities
- Seventh-day Adventist education
