= High Junk Peak =

Mountain in Sai Kung District, Hong Kong

- 釣魚翁
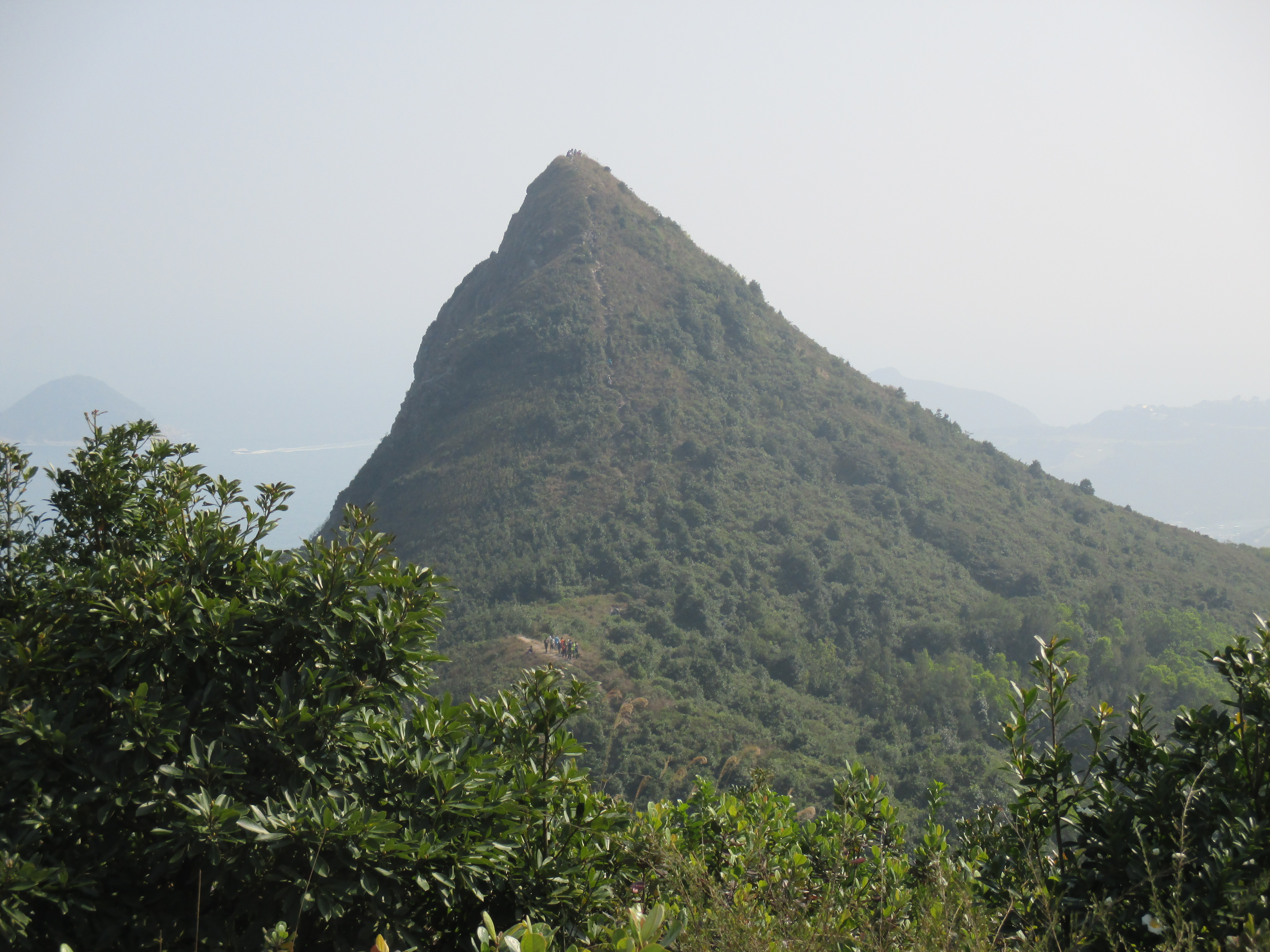
- View of High Junk Peak from Miu Tsai Tun

Highest point
- Elevation: 344 m (1,129 ft); HKPD
- Coordinates: 22°17′44.9″N 114°17′9.02″E

Geography
- Location within Hong Kong
- Location: Hong Kong

High Junk Peak
- Traditional Chinese: 釣魚翁
- Simplified Chinese: 钓鱼翁
Transcriptions
Standard Mandarin
- Hanyu Pinyin: Diào yú wēng
Yue: Cantonese
- Jyutping: Diu3 jyu4 jung1

High Junk Peak (Chinese: 釣魚翁; lit. 'Kingfisher') is a mountain inside Clear Water Bay Country Park, Sai Kung, New Territories, Hong Kong, with a height of 344 metres (1,129 ft).

== Geography ==
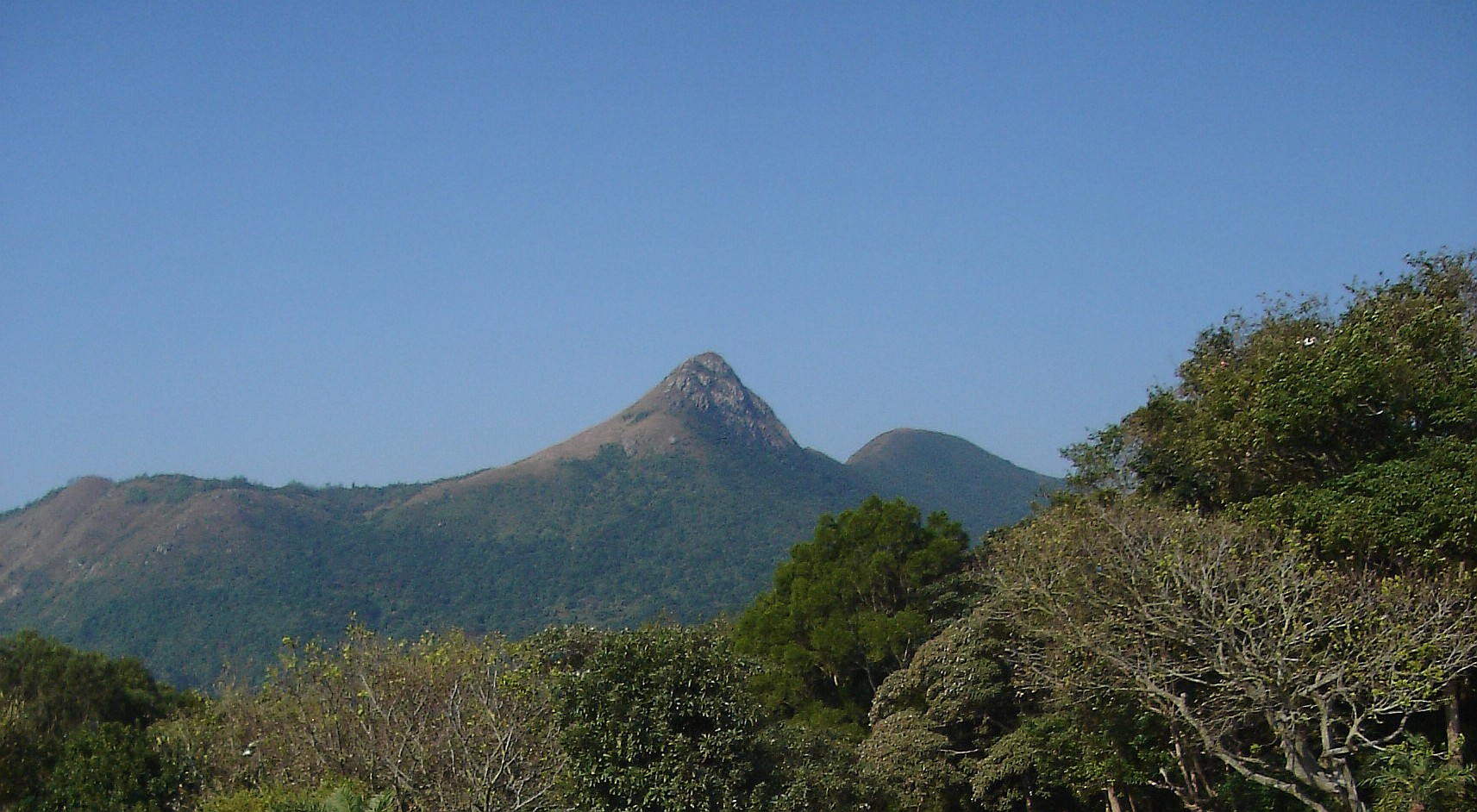
High Junk Peak

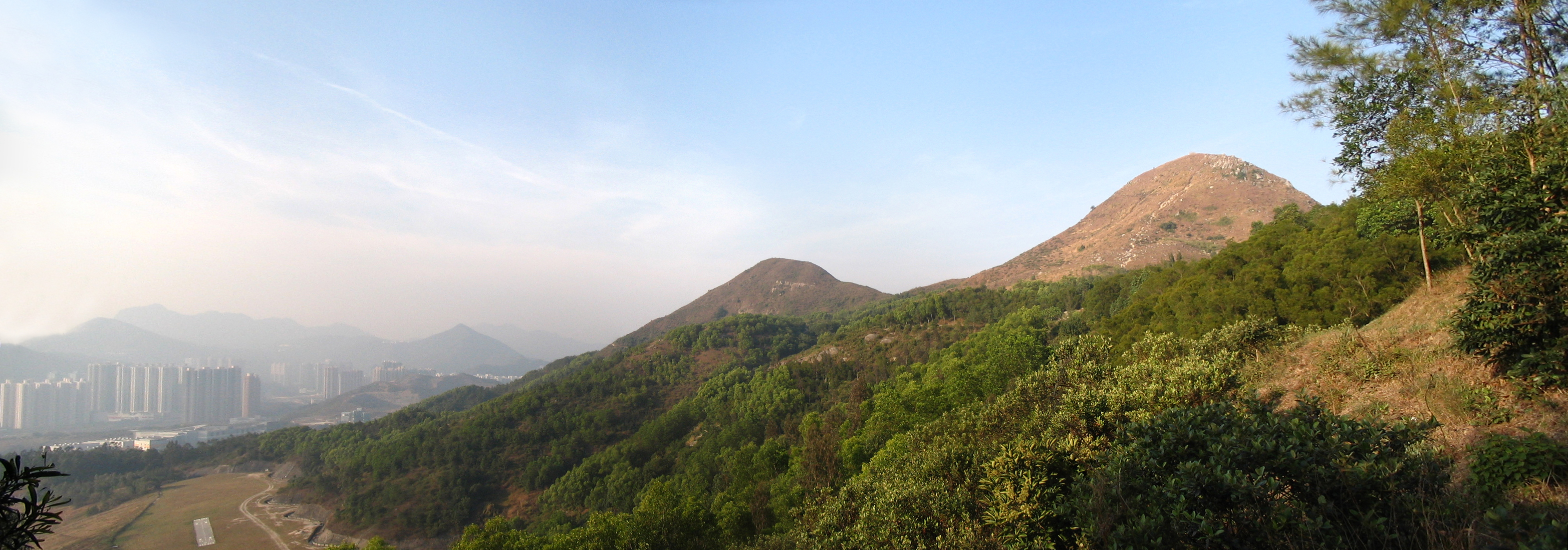
Miu Tsai Tun (middle) and nearby High Junk Peak (right)

High Junk Peak is the highest peak in the Clear Water Bay Peninsula region. To the north lies a mountain called Miu Tsai Tun.

The High Junk Peak Country Trail runs through the foot of High Junk Peak, west of the summit. There are no roads that lead to the summit. The trails to the summit are rather rocky and steep, and not maintained by the government, so proper hiking footwear is advisable.

High Junk Peak is considered by hikers as one of the three sharp peaks in Hong Kong because of its precipitous incline.

== Hiking ==
High Junk Peak is located in Hong Kong's Clear Water Bay District. It is easily recognizable by the pointed peak that gives the mountain its iconic moniker. The start point of the hike is Ng Fai Tin, and is accessible by several buses.

There are several routes and ways to climb High Junk Peak, including a route that does not go up to the summit. This makes the route suitable for all types of hikers.

Those heading up to the peak should proceed with care. In the past, there was a steep, slippery route down from the summit, but there is now a set of rudimentary steps, making the decline much easier.

From the summit, the Lobster Bay coast can be seen on one side, while views on the opposite side are more city-based, stretching all the way to Kowloon!

== Geology ==
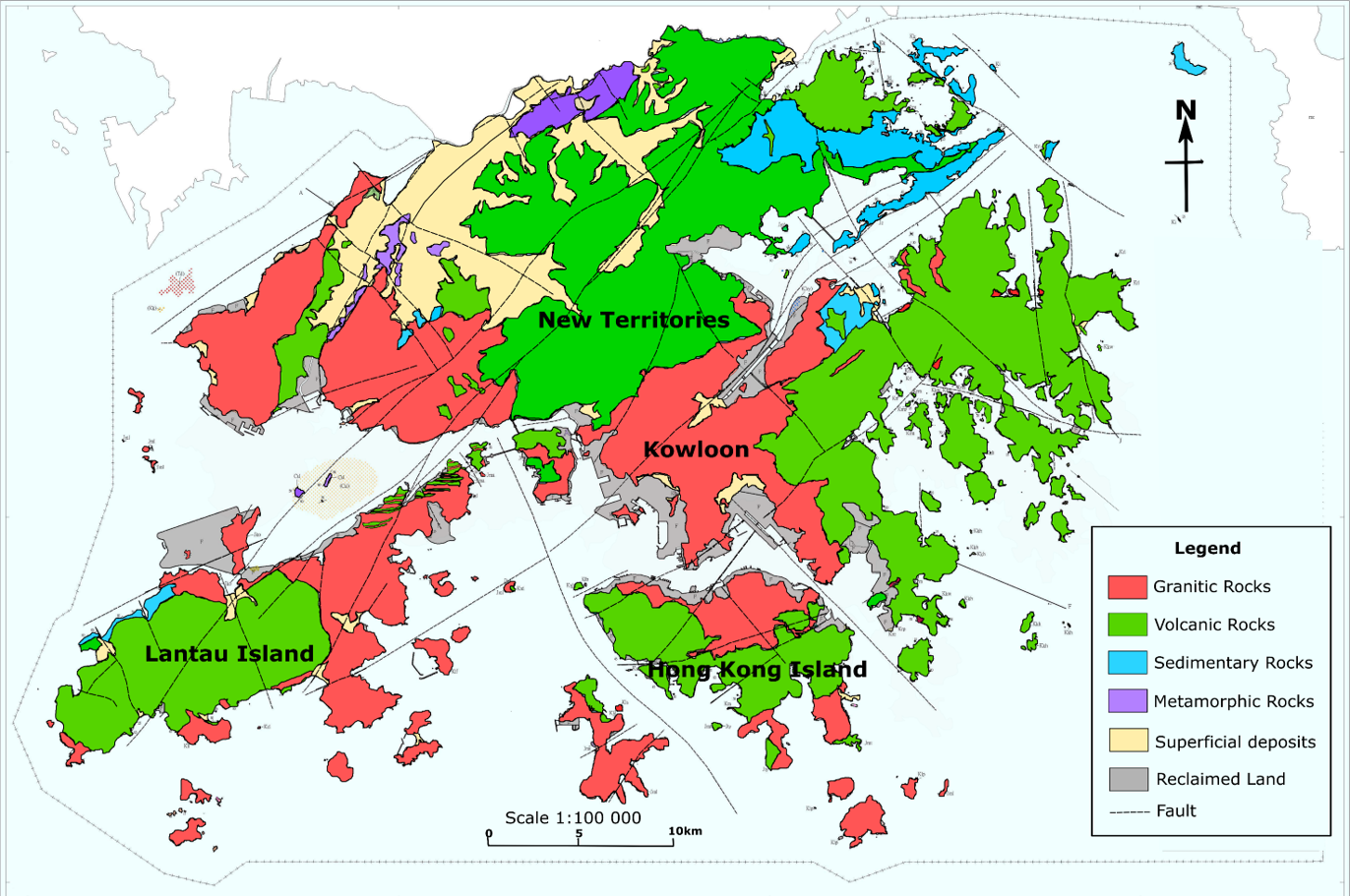
Geological map of Hong Kong showing the distribution of faults and different rock types in Hong Kong. High Junk Peak is in the Green area (Volcanic Rock) in Eastern New Territories

High Junk Peak is formed by volcanic rocks, like many of the tallest mountains in Hong Kong, such as Tai Mo Shan. Some shorter mountains in Hong Kong are formed by older Granitic rocks.

== See also ==
- List of mountains, peaks and hills in Hong Kong
- Miu Tsai Tun
- Clear Water Bay Country Park
