= Tin Hau Temple, Joss House Bay =

Temple in Joss House Bay, Hong Kong

Coordinates: 22.2706°N 114.2899°E

Tin Hau Temple in Joss House Bay
- 佛堂門天后古廟
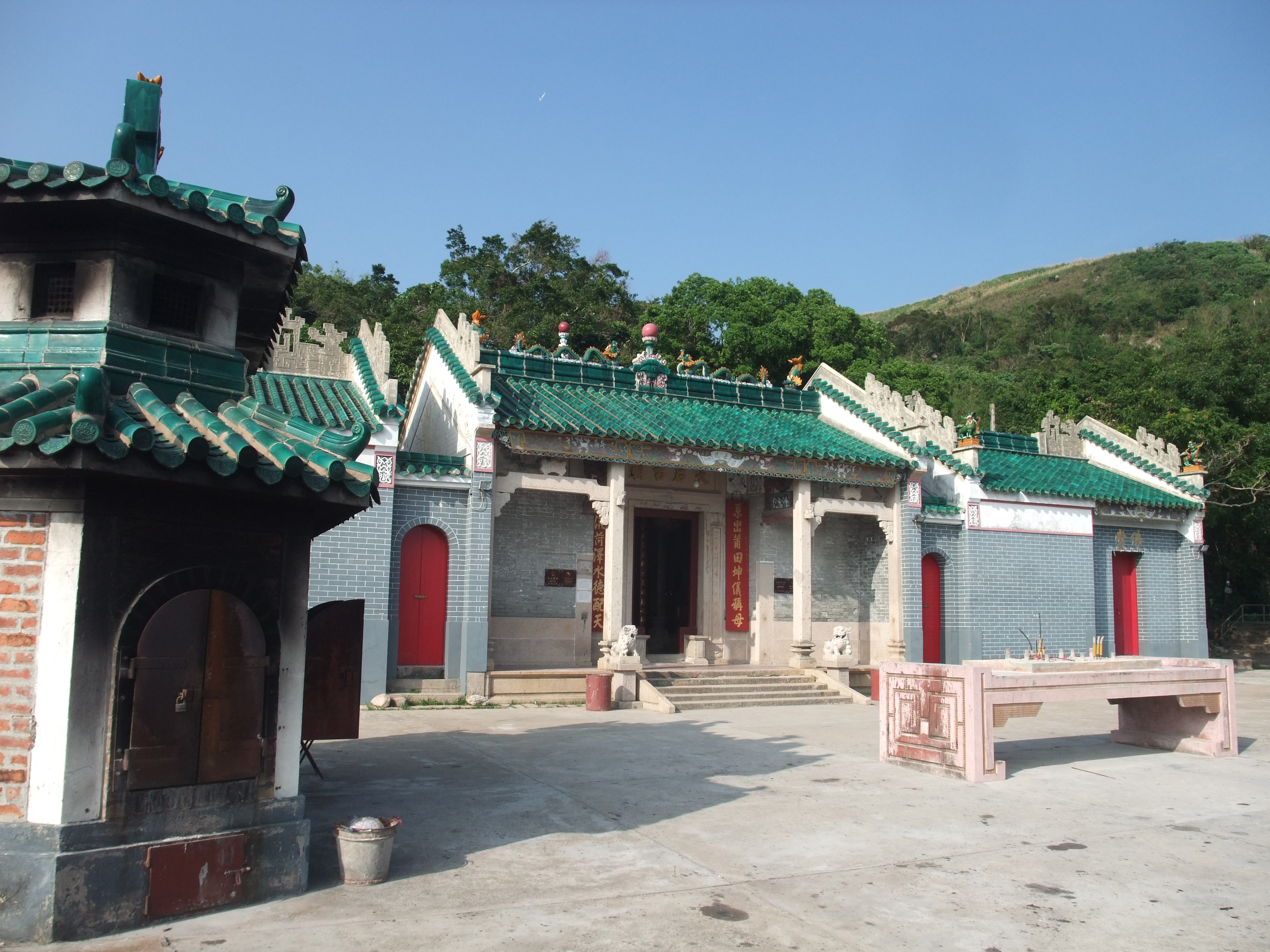
- Tin Hau Temple, Joss House Bay

Religion
- Affiliation: Chinese folk religion
- Region: Fat Tong Mun, Joss House Bay
- Deity: Tin Hau
- Festival: Tin Hau's birthday
- Governing body: Chinese Temples Committee

Location
- Country: Hong Kong
- Interactive map of Tin Hau Temple in Joss House Bay

Architecture
- Founder: Lam Tao-yi (林道義)
- Completed: 1266

Tin Hau Temple, Joss House Bay
- Traditional Chinese: 佛堂門天后古廟
- Literal meaning: Fat Tong Mun Tin Hau Old Temple
Transcriptions
Yue: Cantonese
- Yale Romanization: Faht tòhng mùhn tīn hauh gú miuh
- Jyutping: Fat6 tong4 mun4 tin1 hau6 gu2 miu6

Alternative name
- Traditional Chinese: 大廟灣天后廟
- Literal meaning: Joss House Bay Tin Hau Temple
Transcriptions
Yue: Cantonese
- Yale Romanization: Daaih miuh wāan tīn hauh míu
- Jyutping: Daai6 miu6 waan1 tin1 hau6 miu2

Tai Miu
- Traditional Chinese: 大廟
- Literal meaning: Great Temple
Transcriptions
Yue: Cantonese
- Yale Romanization: Daaih miuh
- Jyutping: Daai6 miu6

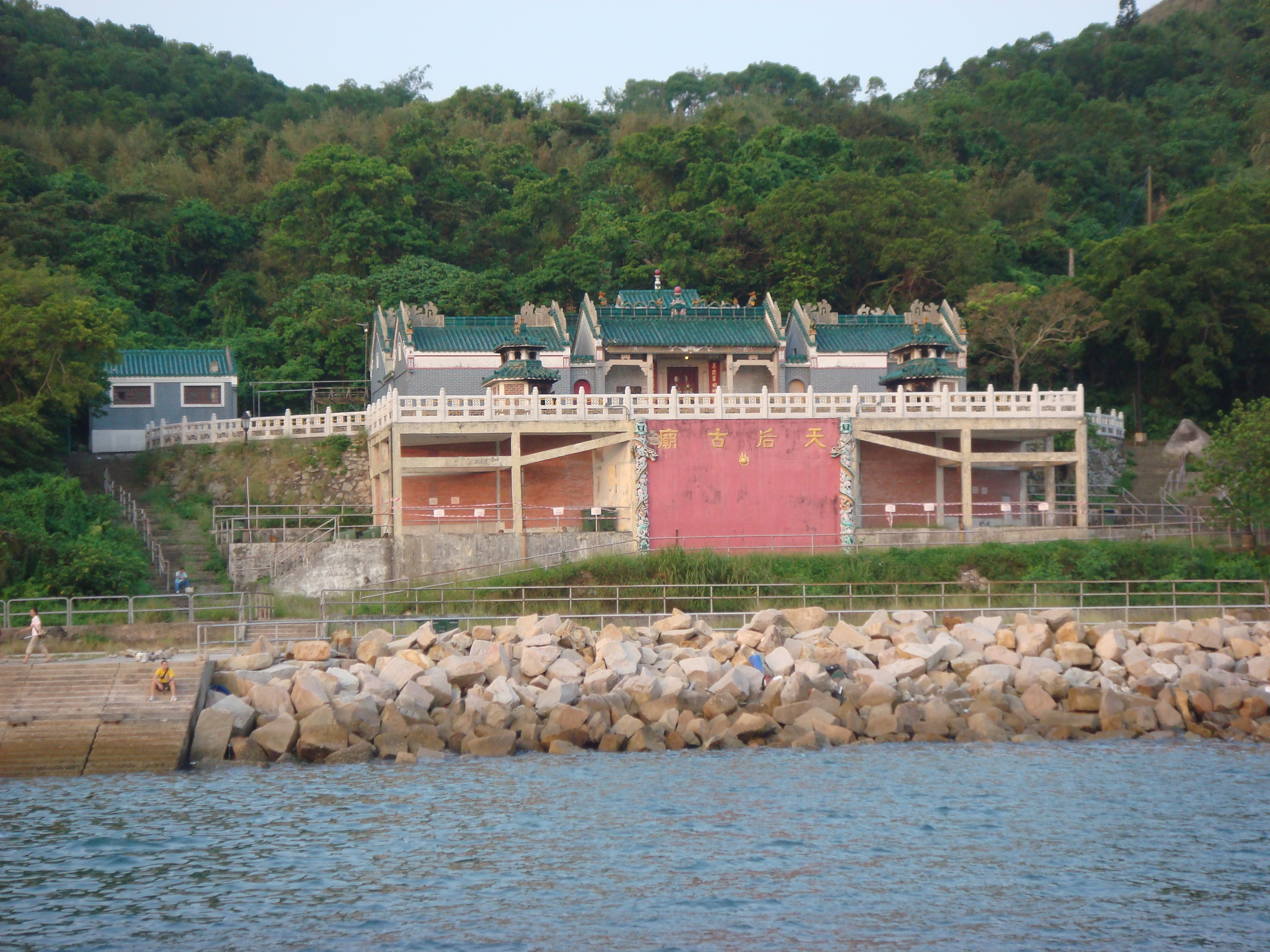
Tin Hau Temple, Joss House Bay

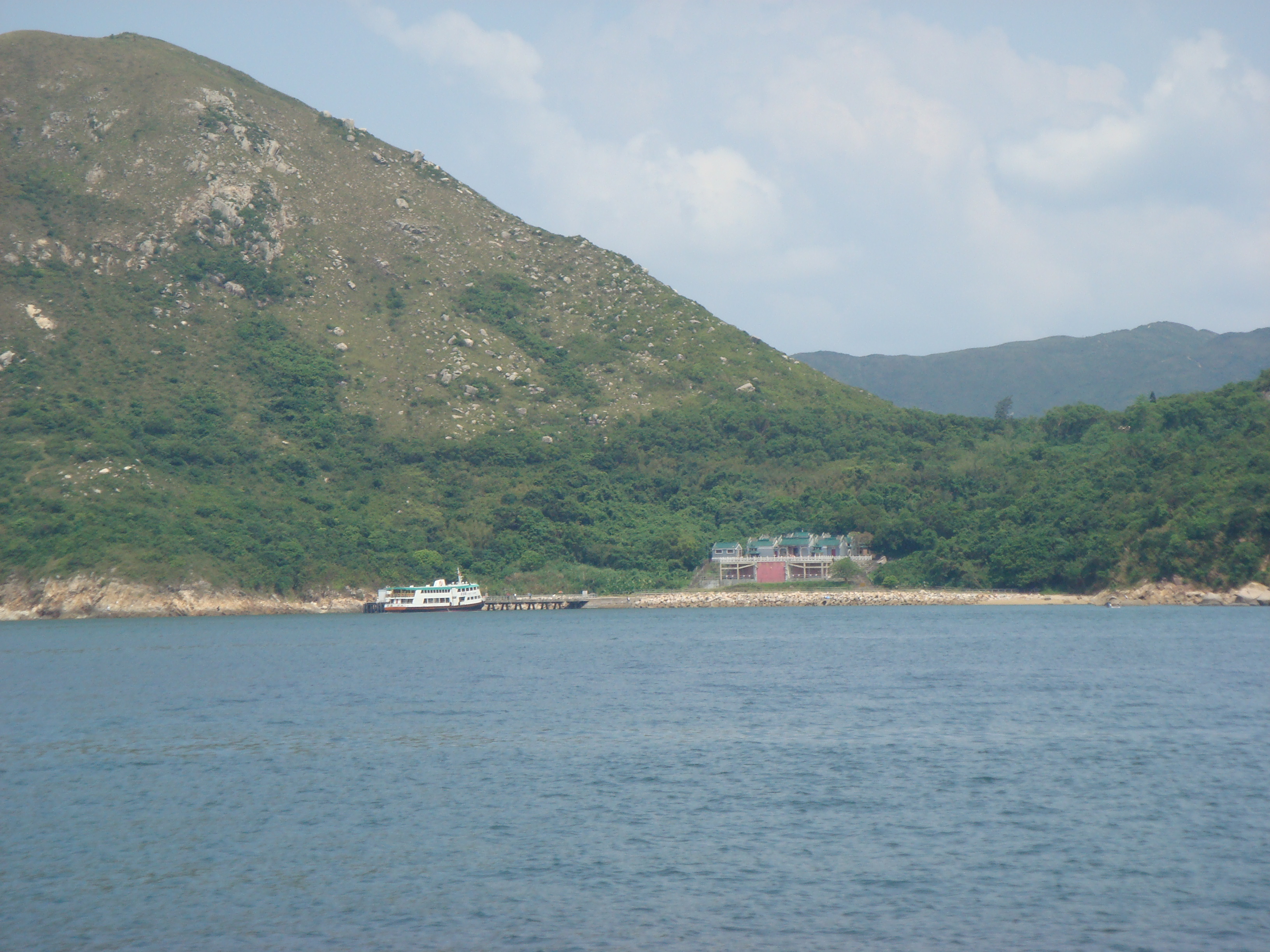
Distant view of Tin Hau Temple, Joss House Bay

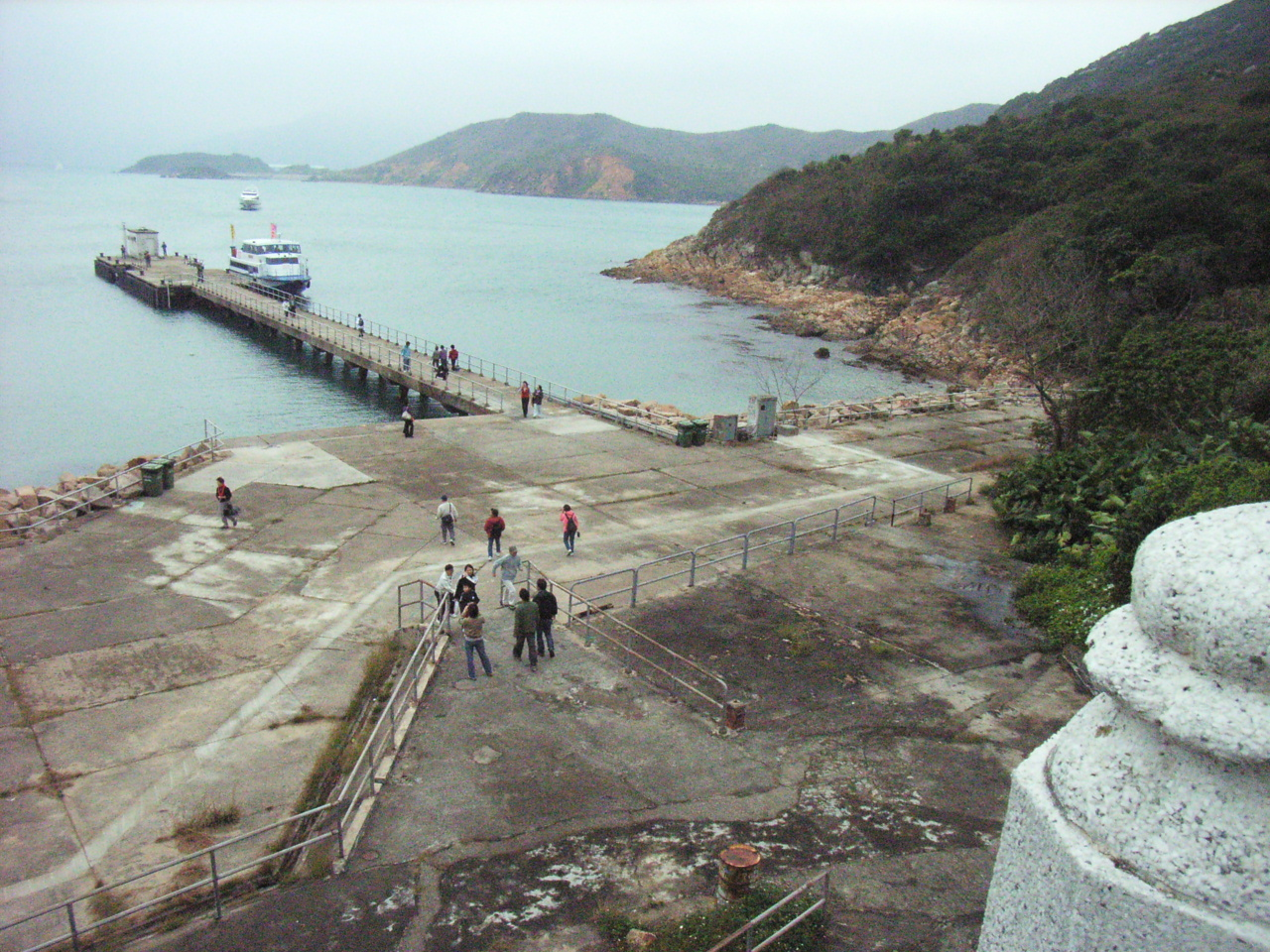
Joss House Bay Public Pier, next to the temple

The Tin Hau Temple in Joss House Bay, sometimes referred to as Tai Miu, is Hong Kong's oldest and largest Tin Hau Temple. It is also said to be the most popular Tin Hau temple both for fishermen and for others in Hong Kong.

== Location ==
The sea-facing temple is located at Fat Tong Mun (佛堂門), on the shore of Joss House Bay, near the south end of Clear Water Bay Peninsula. Joss House Bay derives its name from the temple, or joss house. The Chinese name of Joss House Bay, Tai Miu Wan (大廟灣), literally means "the bay of the large temple".

== History ==
The temple is said to have been built in 1266 by Lam Tao-yi (林道義). There is a rock nearby, that was carved in 1274. It bears the oldest dated inscription known in Hong Kong.

== Tin Hau Festival and events ==
Once a year, on Tin Hau's birthday, the 23rd of the third moon on the Chinese calendar, upwards of 40,000 to 50,000 people attend celebrations at the temple. Thousands of people hike their way, via the High Junk Peak Hiking Trail, to the Temple to pay their respects. Thousands of others sail into Joss House Bay in hundreds of vessels.

The police have the launching ceremony of their new cruisers held at the temple.

== Conservation ==
The temple was managed by the Lam clan until 1939. Since them, it has been managed by the Chinese Temples Committee. Formerly a Grade I historic building, the temple was declared a monument on October 20, 2023.

== Access ==
The temple is accessible via the High Junk Peak Hiking Trail. A shorter walk combined with public transportation is possible from the Clear Water Bay Country Club.

A ferry service to Joss House Bay is available annually from North Point Ferry Pier on the day of Tin Hau's birthday. Joss House Bay Public Pier is located just in front of the temple.

Outside the Tin Hau Birthday Celebration, a regular green minibus (Route 16) operates between MTR Po Lam station Public Transport Interchange and Po Toi O. Visitors should alight at the Tai Miu Wan stop (near the entrance to Clearwater Bay Golf & Country Club) and walk for about 10 minutes down a flight of stairs to Joss House Bay, passing the rock inscription on the way down.
