= Tung Lung Fort =

Fort in Hong Kong

Coordinates: 22°15′18″N 114°17′49″E

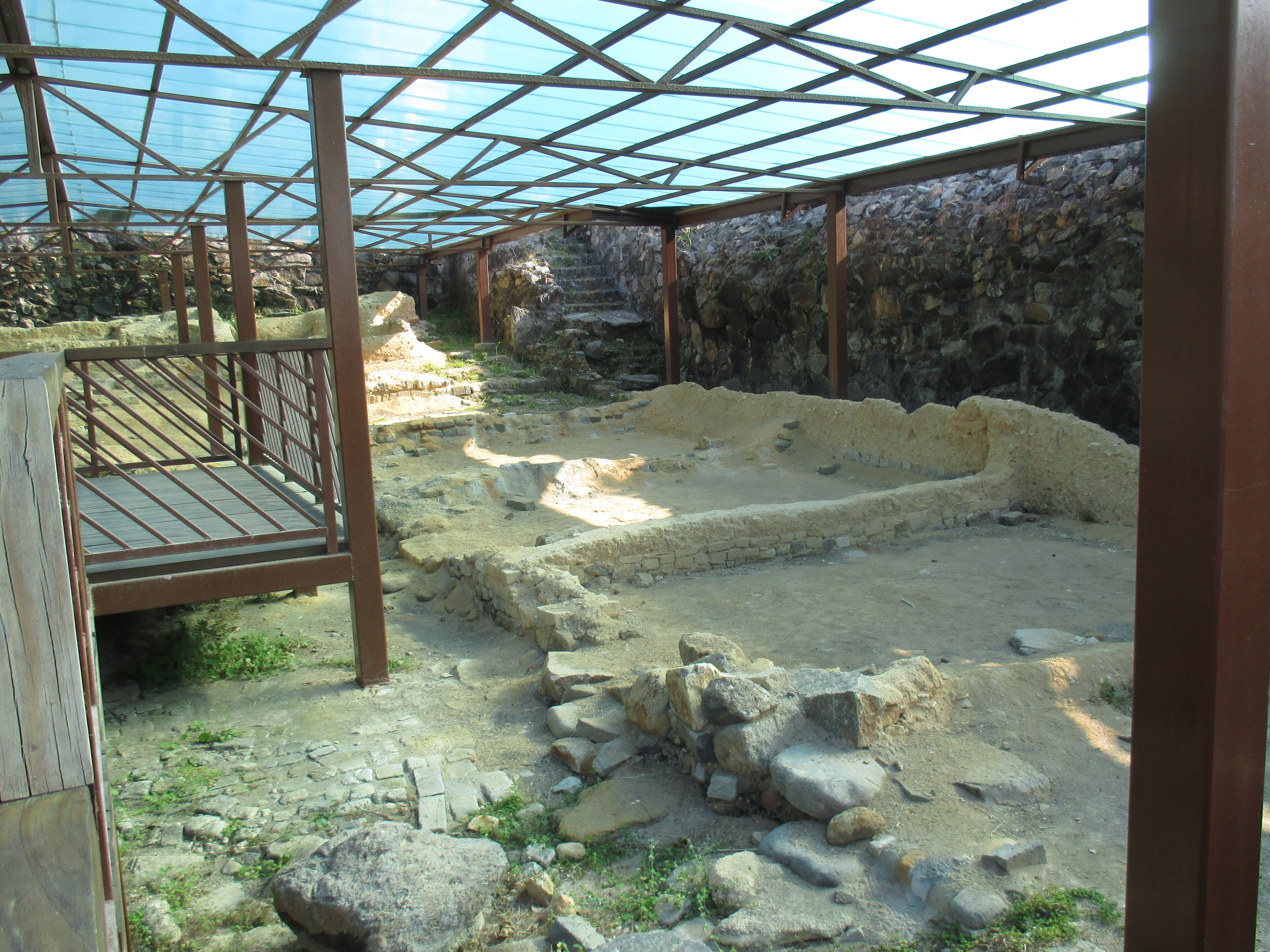
- Tung Lung Fort
- Traditional Chinese: 東龍洲炮台
- Cantonese Yale: Dūng lùhng jāu paau tòih
Transcriptions
Yue: Cantonese
- Yale Romanization: Dūng lùhng jāu paau tòih
- Jyutping: Dung1 lung4 zau1 paau3 toi4

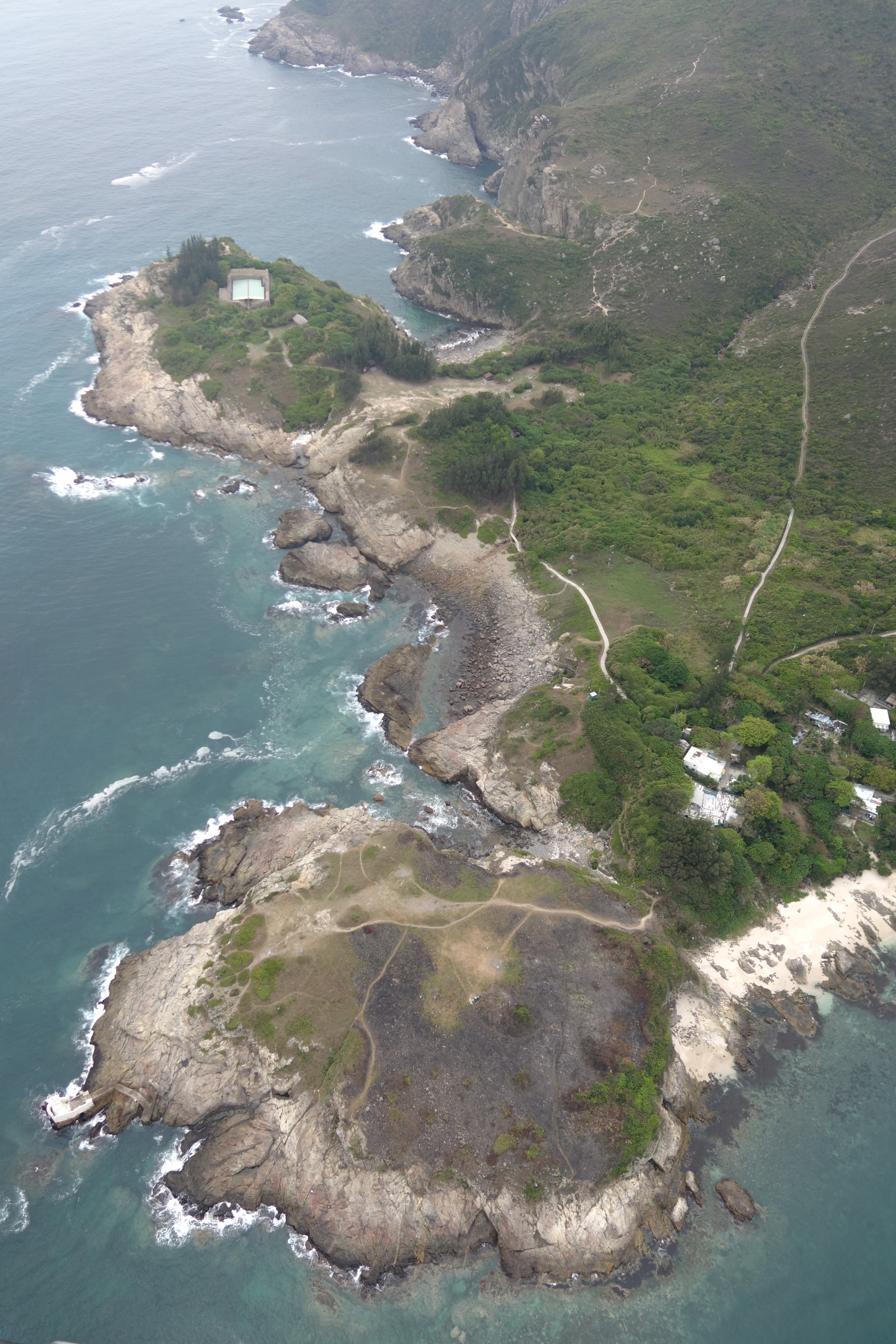
The fort is located near Northeastern shore

Tung Lung Fort, also known as Fat Tong Fort, is a fort on the Tung Lung Chau on the south east water of Hong Kong.

== History ==
It is said the fort was built as a part of a maritime defence system to protect trade and fend off pirates. The fort, according to one record, was built from 1719 to 1724 in the Kangxi era (1662-1722) to guard against pirates, after defeat of the Koxinga Administration in Taiwan. It is rumoured to have been attacked by the famous pirates Cheng Lien Chang and Cheng I, and more recently by the infamous Cheung Po Tsai. The fort was abandoned in 1810 when its personnel moved to another coast fort at the tip of the Kowloon Peninsula which would later become Kowloon Walled City.

== Features ==
The fort is situated at the north-eastern part of the island, 35 m above the water with cliffs on three sides, and commands the Fat Tong Mun Channel. No vessel could pass through without being seen entering or leaving Joss House Bay. The fort may also have been a signal station, passing messages on to military headquarters in Kowloon. When in use it was staffed by an average of 25 sailors from the Tai-pang-hsi navy.

Although no sketches or historic descriptions of the fort are available, observation of the ruins has given an idea of the structure. It was rectangular, composed of 10 feet high rubble stone walls provided with an arch-shaped brick gate for the guards to pass in and out.

== Conservation ==
Tung Lung Fort became a declared monument in 1977 and was restored in 1988. Tung Lung Fort Special Area was designated in 1979 and covers 3 hectares. The Area contains a fort and a campsite.
