= Joss House Bay =

Bay in Hong Kong

Coordinates: 22°16′N 114°17′E

- Traditional Chinese: 大廟灣
- Simplified Chinese: 大庙湾
Transcriptions
Standard Mandarin
- Hanyu Pinyin: Dàmiào Wān
Yue: Cantonese
- Yale Romanization: Daaih miuh wāan
- Jyutping: Daai6 miu6 waan1

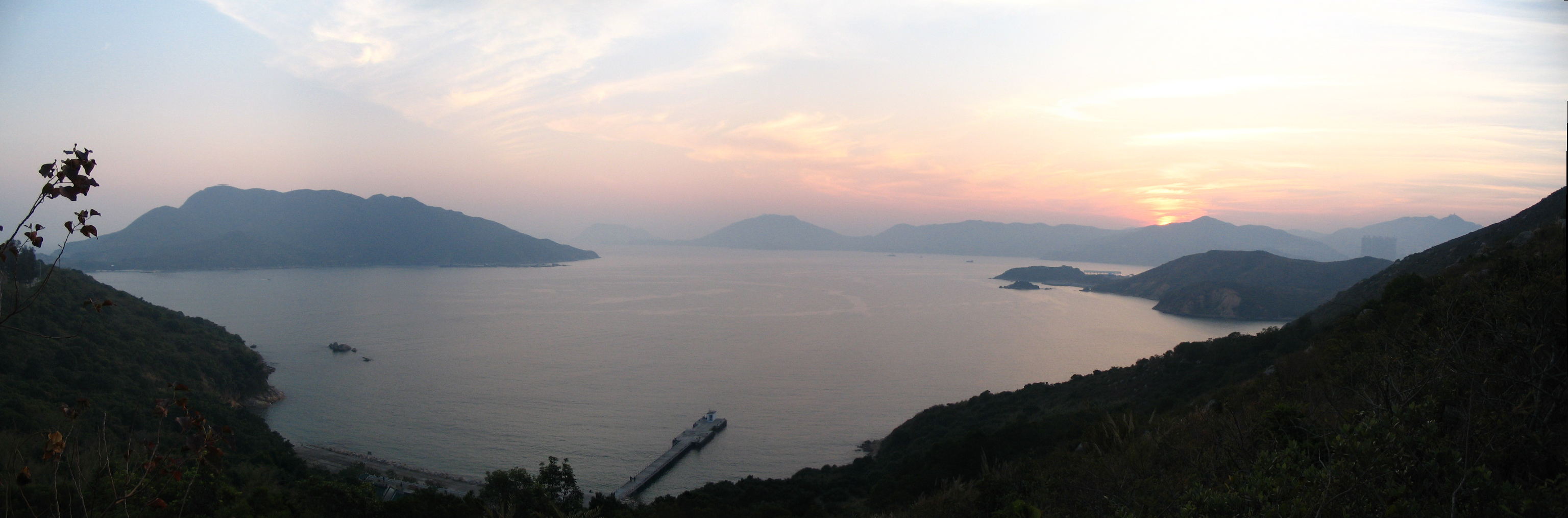
Joss House Bay. The island on the left is Tung Lung Chau.

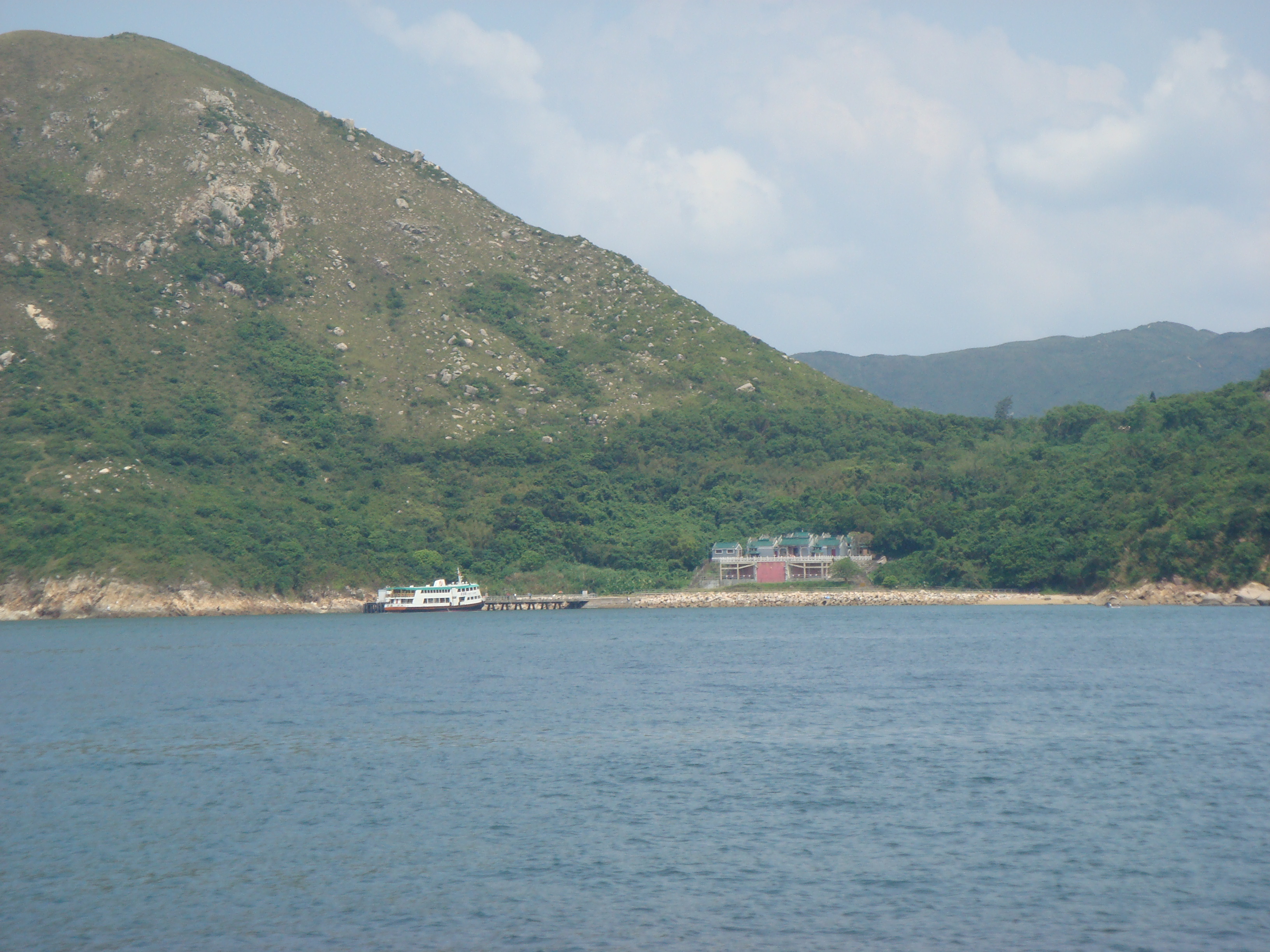
Distant view of the Tin Hau Temple at Joss House Bay. The hill on the left is Tin Ha Shan.

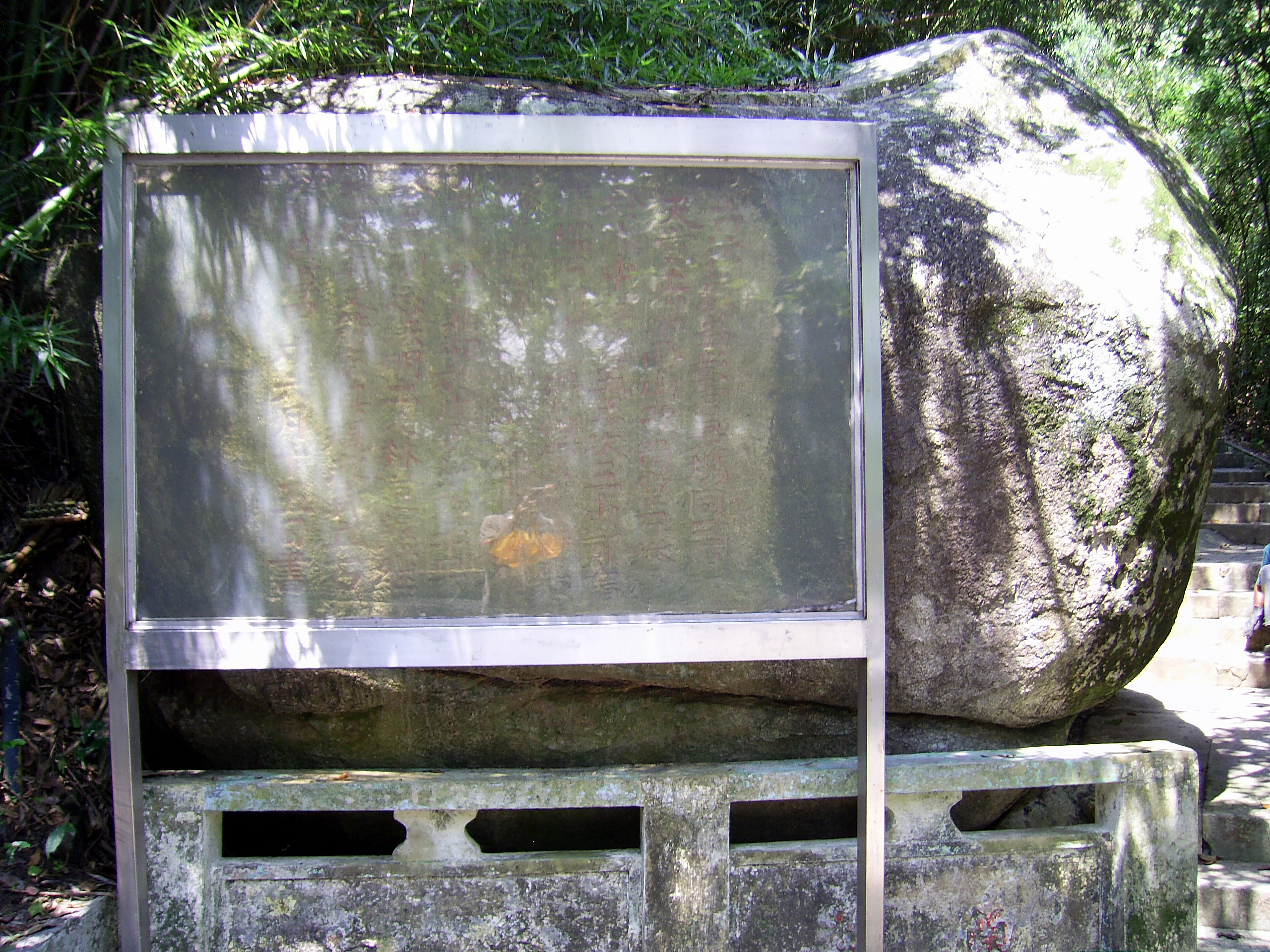
Rock inscription at Joss House Bay.

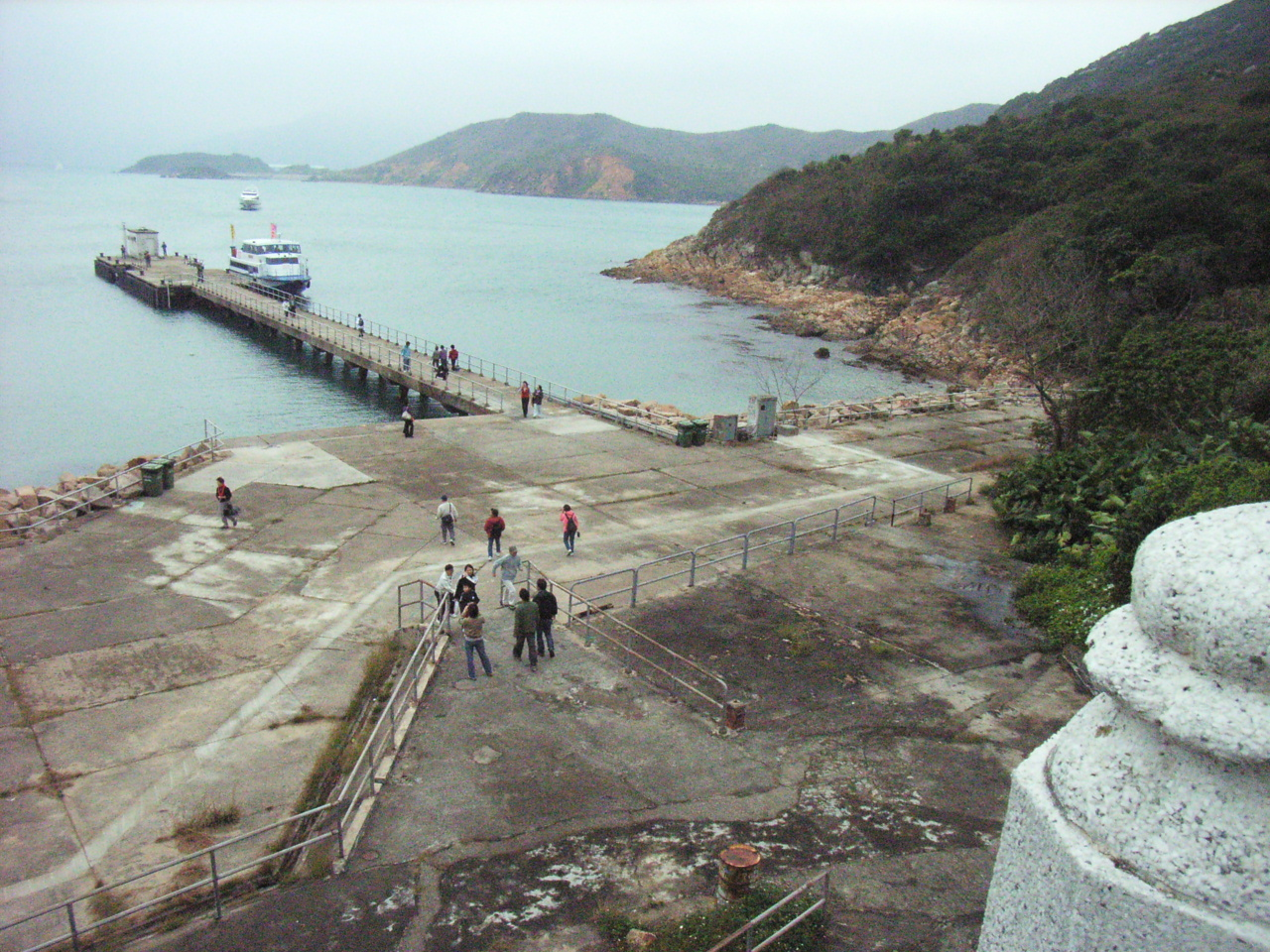
Ferry pier.

Joss House Bay, also known as Tai Miu Wan, is near the south end of Clear Water Bay Peninsula in Hong Kong. The Cantonese name Tai Miu Wan means "the bay of large temple" after the oldest Tin Hau Temple in Hong Kong. This is also a popular place for fishing enthusiasts.

== Tin Hau Temple ==
The Tin Hau Temple was a large joss house built in 1266. It is the oldest and biggest Tin Hau Temple in Hong Kong so it is called the Big Temple. It is a Grade I Historic Building. The temple is located near Fat Tong Mun, the channel between the peninsula and Tung Lung Chau on the major channel along the sea route in the South China. It was founded by the Lam family in former Po Kong in Kowloon.

== Rock inscription ==
The rock inscription at Joss House Bay is a declared monument of Hong Kong since 1979. This inscription is dated to the Jiashu year of the Xianchun reign in the Southern Song dynasty (i.e. 1274 AD). It is the oldest dated inscription in Hong Kong, and records a visit by Yan Yizhang, an officer in charge of the salt administration, and a friend. It also gives the history of two temples, north and south of Joss House Bay.

== Transportation ==
A regular green minibus (Route 16) operates between MTR Po Lam station Public Transport Interchange and Po Toi O. Visitors should alight at the Tai Miu Wan stop (near the entrance to Clearwater Bay Golf & Country Club) and walk for about 10 minutes down a flight of stairs to Joss House Bay, passing the rock inscription on the way down.

Every year during Tin Hau Festival, New World First Ferry operates a special ferry service between North Point and Joss House Bay for worshippers. This service is regulated by the Transport Department over two designated days: the day preceding the Tin Hau Festival and the day of the Tin Hau Festival. Both fast ferry and ordinary ferry services are provided. Thousands of worshippers typically use this service. A general summary of fares and departure times can be found on the Transport Department website.
