= Steep Island, Hong Kong =

Small uninhabited island of Hong Kong

Steep Island
Native name: 青洲
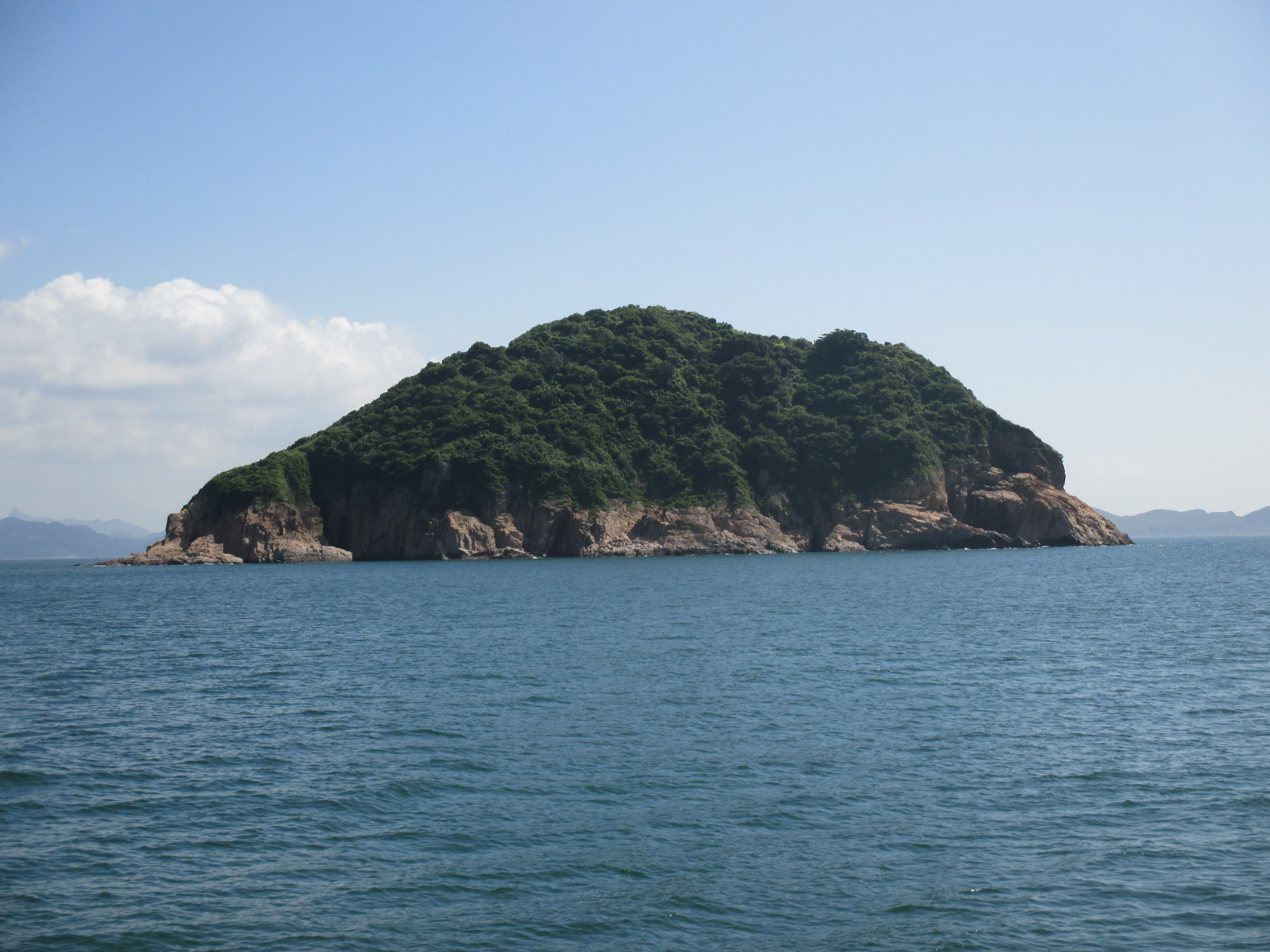
- Steep Island, Hong Kong

- Location within Hong Kong

Geography
- Coordinates: 22.276071°N 114.314075°E

Administration
- Hong Kong
- Districts: Sai Kung District

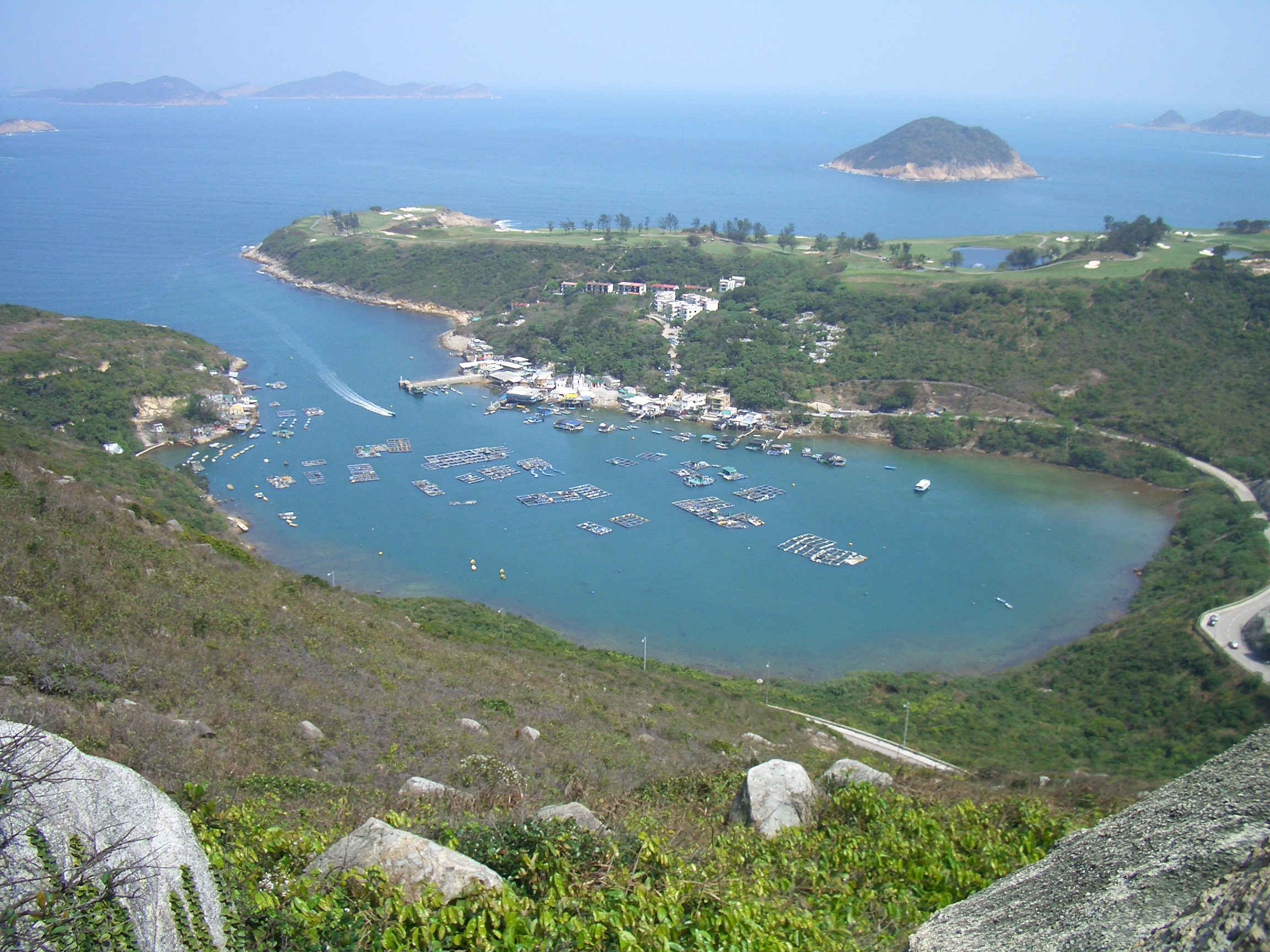
View of Po Toi O, The Clearwater Bay Golf & Country Club and Steep Island (top right)

Steep Island, also known as Ching Chau (Chinese: 青洲) is a small uninhabited island of Hong Kong, located off the eastern coast of Clear Water Bay Peninsula. Administratively, it is part of Sai Kung District.

== See also ==
- Clear Water Bay
