= Tin Ha Shan =

Hill in Hong Kong

- 田下山
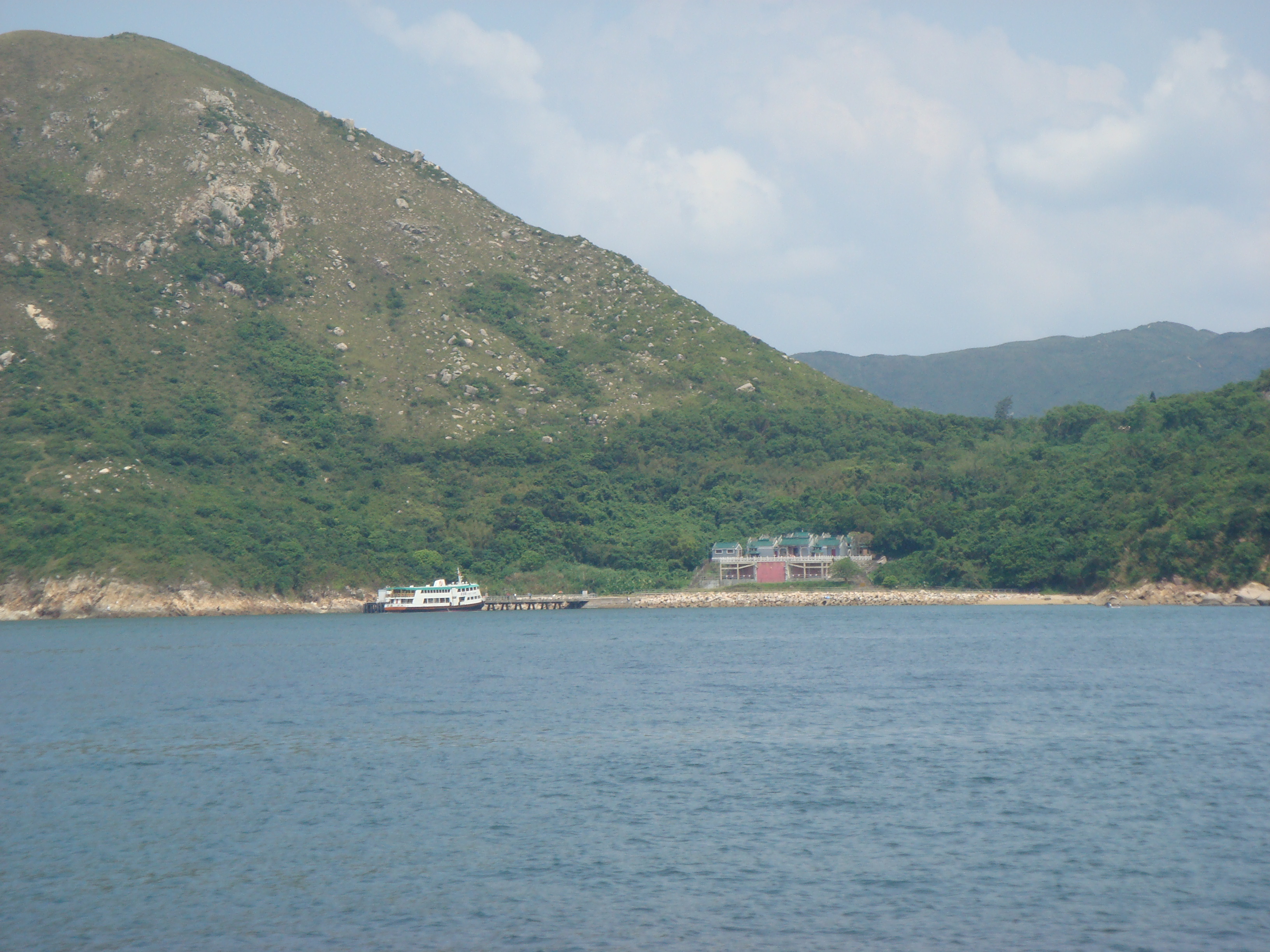
- Tin Ha Shan (left) and Tin Hau Temple, Joss House Bay

Highest point
- Elevation: 273 m (896 ft)
- Coordinates: 22°16′36″N 114°17′05″E

Naming
- Native name: 田下山 (Chinese)

Geography
- Location within Hong Kong

Tin Ha Shan (Chinese: 田下山) is a hill in Clear Water Bay Country Park, Sai Kung District, Hong Kong.

== History ==
When the ban on human settlement of coastal areas of the Great Clearance was lifted in 1668, the coastal defense was reinforced. Twenty-one fortified mounds, each manned with an army unit, were created along the border of Xin'an County, and at least five of them were located in present-day Hong Kong. 1) The Tuen Mun Mound, believed to have been built on Castle Peak or Kau Keng Shan, was manned by 50 soldiers. 2) The Kowloon Mound on Lion Rock and 3) the Tai Po Tau Mound northwest of Tai Po Old Market had each 30 soldiers. 4) The Ma Tseuk Leng Mound stood between present-day Sha Tau Kok and Fan Ling and was manned by 50 men. 5) The fifth one at Fat Tong Mun, probably on today's Tin Ha Shan Peninsula, was an observation post manned by 10 soldiers. In 1682, these forces were re-organized and manned by detachments from the Green Standard Army with reduced strength.
