= Lam Kee Ferry =

Defunct Hong Kong ferry operator

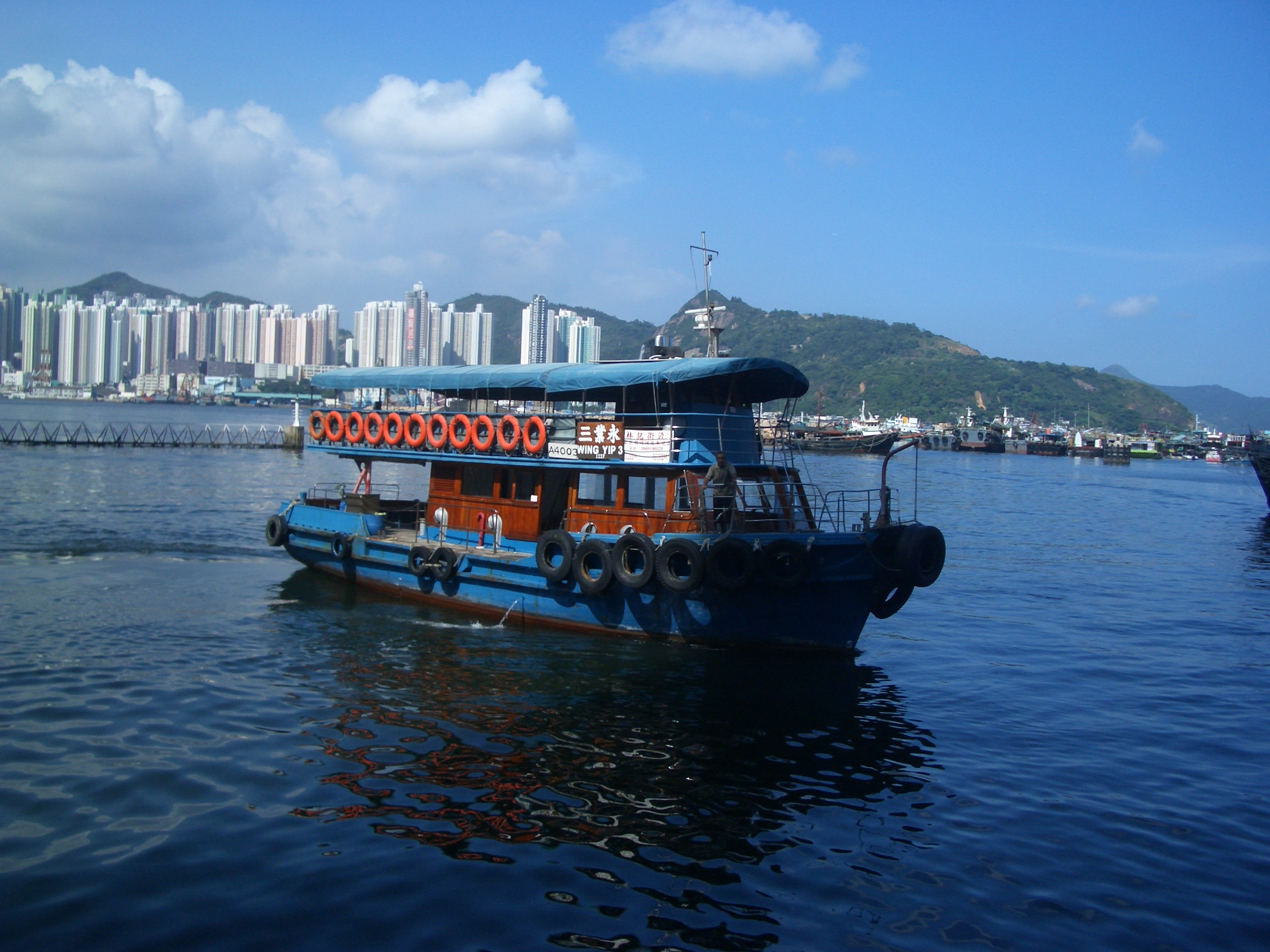
Lam Kee Ferry's Wing Yip 3 kai-to.

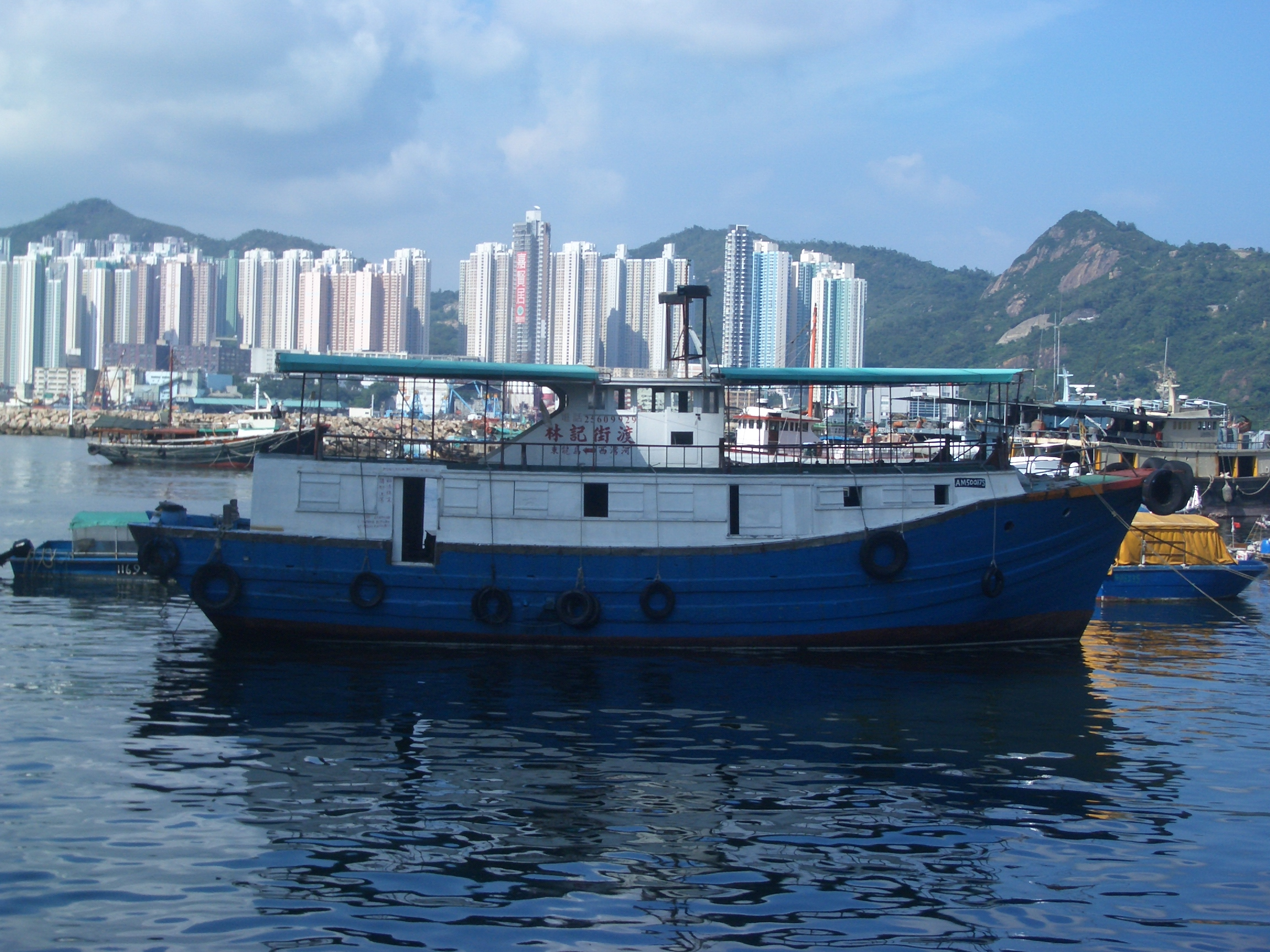
Lam Kee Ferry's old ferry AM50017S.

Lam Kee Ferry (Chinese: 林記街渡) was a ferry service provider in Hong Kong. It served the Sai Wan Ho to Tung Lung Island route.

== Route ==
Lam Kee Ferry operated one route:

- Sai Wan Ho ↔ Tung Lung Island (Closed on 21 January 2014)

This route is restored by a new operator from 20 Jun 2015, providing services only on weekend and public holidays.

== Fleet ==
Wing Yip 3 was the company's kai-to for the above route. It is a wooden kai-to and has a capacity of 122 passengers.

AM50017S is the old ferry used for the route. It was originally a fishing boat with no seats. Passengers had to sit on the floor. It is not currently in use.
