= Declared monuments of Hong Kong =

Heritage sites in Hong Kong

Declared monuments of Hong Kong are places, structures or buildings legally declared to receive the highest level of protection. In Hong Kong, declaring a monument requires consulting the Antiquities Advisory Board, the approval of the Chief Executive of Hong Kong as well as the publication of the notice on the Hong Kong Government Gazette.

As of December 2024, there are 136 declared monuments in Hong Kong, with 58 listed on Hong Kong Island, 55 on New Territories, 14 on Kowloon, and 9 on the Outlying Islands.

Under Antiquities and Monuments Ordinance, some other buildings are classified as Grades I, II and III historic buildings, and are not listed below.

== Monument declaration and historic buildings grading system ==
There was no direct link between graded buildings and monuments. As of July 2007, 607 buildings had been graded (since 1980), 54 of these, including five Grade I buildings, had been demolished. As of August 2007, of 151 buildings classified as Grade I, only 28 pre-war buildings have been declared monuments since 1980.

On 26 November 2008, the Antiquities Advisory Board announced that the declaration of monuments would be related to the grading of historic buildings.

== Proposed monuments ==
The Antiquities Authority (the Secretary for Development) may declare a building facing a demolition risk a proposed monument, thus providing the building with immediate protection against demolition. A Declaration of "proposed" status is valid for twelve months and may be extended. However the affected owner may object to the "proposed" status. Five buildings were declared proposed monuments between 1982 and 2012: Ohel Leah Synagogue (later Grade I in 1990), Morrison Building (subsequently declared in 2004), Jessville (later Grade III), King Yin Lei (subsequently declared in 2008) and Ho Tung Gardens (later demolished in 2013). Hung Lau was declared a proposed monument on 9 March 2017, and subsequently retained its Grade I status.

== Monuments ==
=== Hong Kong Island ===
Declared monuments in Hong Kong Island
#ID	Name	Photograph	Declaration date	Location	Description	Coordinates	Ref(s)
M0001	Rock Carving at Big Wave Bay	Upload another image	13 October 1978	Big Wave Bay		22°14′46″N 114°14′56″E	
M0008	Duddell Street Steps and Gas Lamps	Upload another image	31 August 1979	Central		22°16′47″N 114°09′24″E	
M0015	Tin Hau Temple	Upload another image	26 March 1982	Causeway Bay		22°16′56″N 114°11′34″E	
M0025	Old Stanley Police Station	Upload another image	15 June 1984	Stanley	Now used as a ParknShop supermarket.	22°13′06″N 114°12′47″E	
M0026	The Exterior of the Old Supreme Court	Upload another image	15 June 1984	Central	Served as the Legislative Council Building from 1985–2011.	22°16′52″N 114°09′36″E	
M0027	The Exterior of the Main Building, the University of Hong Kong	Upload another image	15 June 1984	Mid-Levels		22°17′03″N 114°08′16″E	
M0028	Rock Carvings at Wong Chuk Hang	Upload another image	15 June 1984	Wong Chuk Hang		22°15′09″N 114°10′29″E	
M0036	Flagstaff House	Upload another image	14 September 1989	Central		22°16′43″N 114°09′45″E	
M0037	Former French Mission Building	Upload another image	14 September 1989	Central		22°16′46″N 114°09′35″E	
M0038	Law Uk Hakka House	Upload another image	10 November 1989	Chai Wan		22°15′51″N 114°14′08″E	
M0040	Old Wan Chai Post Office	Upload another image	18 May 1990	Wan Chai	Currently used by the Environmental Protection Department	22°16′28″N 114°10′24″E	
M0041	Old Pathological Institute	Upload another image	29 June 1990	Mid-Levels		22°17′00″N 114°08′55″E	
M0042	Western Market	Upload another image	26 June 1990	Sheung Wan		22°17′14″N 114°09′01″E	
M0046	Main Building of St. Stephen's Girls' College	Upload another image	28 February 1992	Mid-Levels		22°17′01″N 114°08′38″E	
M0049	The Helena May main building	Upload another image	8 October 1993	Central		22°16′39″N 114°09′31″E	
M0052	Gate Lodge of the Former Mountain Lodge	Upload another image	31 March 1995	Victoria Peak		22°16′28″N 114°08′45″E	
M0053	Central Police Station Compound	Upload another image	8 September 1995	Central		22°16′54″N 114°09′15″E	
M0054	Former Central Magistracy	Upload another image	8 September 1995	Central		22°16′52″N 114°09′16″E	
M0055	Victoria Prison Compound	Upload another image	8 September 1995	Central		22°16′51″N 114°09′14″E	
M0056	The Exterior of University Hall, the University of Hong Kong	Upload another image	15 September 1995	Pok Fu Lam		22°15′48″N 114°08′07″E	
M0057	The Exterior of Hung Hing Ying Building, the University of Hong Kong	Upload another image	15 September 1995	Mid-Levels		22°17′04″N 114°08′16″E	
M0058	The Exterior of Tang Chi Ngong Building, the University of Hong Kong	Upload another image	15 September 1995	Mid-Levels		22°17′01″N 114°08′24″E	
M0059	Government House	Upload another image	29 September 1995	Central		22°16′43″N 114°09′27″E	
M0060	St. John's Cathedral	Upload another image	5 January 1996	Central		22°16′44″N 114°09′34″E	
M0070	North and West Blocks of St. Joseph's College	Upload another image	18 August 2000	Central		22°16′36″N 114°09′31″E	
M0080	Cape D'Aguilar Lighthouse	Upload another image	3 March 2006	Shek O		22°12′33″N 114°15′33″E	
M0085	King Yin Lei	Upload another image	11 July 2008	Mid-Levels		22°16′00″N 114°10′51″E	
M0086	Green Island Lighthouse Compound	Upload another image	7 November 2008	Green Island		22°17′01″N 114°06′41″E	
M0087	6 Historic Structures of Pok Fu Lam Reservoir	Upload another image	18 September 2009	Pok Fu Lam		22°15′54″N 114°08′14″E	
M0088	22 Historic Structures of Tai Tam Group of Reservoirs	Upload another image	18 September 2009	Tai Tam Country Park		22°16′N 114°13′E	
M0089	3 Historic Structures of Wong Nai Chung Reservoir	Upload another image	18 September 2009	Wong Nai Chung		22°15′24″N 114°11′43″E	
M0090	4 Historic Structures of Aberdeen Reservoir	Upload another image	18 September 2009	Aberdeen		22°15′25″N 114°09′48″E	
M0096	Man Mo Temple Compound	Upload another image	12 November 2010	Sheung Wan		22°17′02″N 114°09′01″E	
M0098	Kom Tong Hall	Upload another image	12 November 2010	Mid-Levels		22°16′55″N 114°09′04″E	
M0100	School House of St. Stephen's College	Upload another image	2 December 2011	Stanley		22°12′57″N 114°12′56″E	
M0101	King's College	Upload another image	2 December 2011	Mid-Levels		22°17′04″N 114°08′25″E	
M0102	The Cenotaph	Upload another image	22 November 2013	Central		22°16′54″N 114°09′38″E	
M0103	Béthanie	Upload another image	22 November 2013	Pok Fu Lam		22°15′44″N 114°08′07″E	
M0106	Lin Fa Temple	Upload another image		Causeway Bay		22°16′47″N 114°11′35″E	
M0107	Hung Shing Temple	Upload another image		Ap Lei Chau		22°14′41″N 114°09′21″E	
M0110	The Race Course Fire Memorial	Upload another image	23 October 2015	So Kon Po	Erected in 1922 to pay respect to those who died in the Happy Valley Racecourse fire, which broke out on 26 February 1918.	22°16′22″N 114°11′24″E	
M0111	The facade of the Old Mental Hospital	Upload another image		Sai Ying Pun		22°17′06″N 114°08′39″E	
M0112	Block 7 of the old Lei Yue Mun Barracks	Upload another image		Chai Wan		22°16′48″N 114°13′58″E	
M0113	Block 10 of the old Lei Yue Mun Barracks	Upload another image		Chai Wan		22°16′46″N 114°13′58″E	
M0114	Block 25 of the old Lei Yue Mun Barracks	Upload another image		Chai Wan		22°16′37″N 114°13′59″E	
M0115	Tung Lin Kok Yuen	Upload another image		Happy Valley	Buddhist nunnery and educational institution	22°16′01″N 114°11′08″E	
M0118	The Exterior of Fung Ping Shan Building, the University of Hong Kong	Upload another image		Mid-Levels			
M0119	The Exterior of Eliot Hall, the University of Hong Kong	Upload another image		Mid-Levels			
M0120	The Exterior of May Hall, the University of Hong Kong	Upload another image		Mid-Levels			
M0121	Rock Carving at Cape Collinson, Chai Wan	Upload another image		Cape Collinson		22°15′44″N 114°15′24″E	
M0122	Yuk Hui Temple, Wan Chai	Upload another image		Wan Chai			
M0124	The Masonry Bridge of Pok Fu Lam Reservoir	Upload another image	22 May 2020	Pok Fu Lam	This masonry bridge is not part of the 4 masonry bridges identified in the 6 Historic Structures of Pok Fu Lam Reservoir (M0087).		
M0125	Tung Wah Coffin Home	Upload another image	22 May 2020	Sandy Bay			
M0127	Bonham Road Government Primary School	Upload another image	16 July 2021	Sai Ying Pun			
M0130	Jamia Mosque (Hong Kong)	Upload another image	10 March 2022	Mid-Levels			
M0132	Hong Kong City Hall	Upload another image	10 March 2022	Central, Hong Kong			
M0134	Chinese YMCA of Hong Kong	Upload another image	10 November 2023	Bridges Street, Sheung Wan, Hong Kong			
M0135	Lo Pan Temple	Upload another image	10 October 2024	Kennedy Town, Hong Kong			

=== Kowloon ===
Declared monuments in Kowloon
#ID	Name	Photograph	Declaration date	Location	Description	Coordinates	Ref(s)
M0024	Hong Kong Observatory	Upload another image	15 June 1984	Tsim Sha Tsui	The declared monument in the Hong Kong Observatory compound is the historical building, built in 1883.	22°18′08″N 114°10′27″E	
M0035	Lei Cheng Uk Han Tomb	Upload another image	18 November 1988	Cheung Sha Wan		22°20′17″N 114°09′36″E	
M0043	Former Kowloon-Canton Railway Clock Tower	Upload another image	13 July 1990	Tsim Sha Tsui		22°17′37″N 114°10′10″E	
M0045	Former Kowloon British School	Upload another image	19 July 1991	Tsim Sha Tsui	Now houses the Antiquities and Monuments Office.	22°18′06″N 114°10′20″E	
M0051	Former Marine Police Headquarters Compound	Upload another image	23 December 1994	Tsim Sha Tsui		22°17′44″N 114°10′12″E	
M0062	Remnants of the South Gate of Kowloon Walled City	Upload another image	4 October 1996	Kowloon City		22°19′54″N 114°11′27″E	
M0063	Former Yamen Building of Kowloon Walled City	Upload another image	4 October 1996	Kowloon City		22°19′56″N 114°11′26″E	
M0084	Maryknoll Convent School	Upload another image	16 May 2008	Kowloon Tong		22°19′39″N 114°10′45″E	
M0095	Tung Wah Museum	Upload another image	12 November 2010	Yau Ma Tei		22°18′54″N 114°10′19″E	
M0108	Hau Wong Temple, Kowloon City	Upload another image		Kowloon City		22°19′58″N 114°11′15″E	
M0109	Signal Tower at Blackhead Point	Upload another image		Signal Hill Garden at Blackhead Point, Tsim Sha Tsui		22°17′46″N 114°10′28″E	
M0116	Kowloon Union Church	Upload another image	13 October 2017	Jordan Road, Yau Ma Tei		22°18′20″N 114°10′22″E	
M0126	Tin Hau Temple and the adjoining buildings	Upload another image	22 May 2020	Yau Ma Tei			
M0131	Lui Seng Chun	Upload another image	10 March 2022	Mong Kok			

=== New Territories ===
Declared monuments in the New Territories
#ID	Name	Photograph	Declaration date	Location	Description	Coordinates	Ref(s)
M0002	Rock Carving at Kau Sai Chau	Upload another image	26 January 1979	Sai Kung		22°21′35″N 114°18′51″E	
M0003	Rock Carving at Tung Lung Chau	Upload another image	26 January 1979	Sai Kung		22°14′57″N 114°17′23″E	
M0004	Rock Inscription at Joss House Bay	Upload another image	26 January 1979	Sai Kung		22°16′15″N 114°17′25″E	
M0009	Tung Lung Fort	Upload another image	25 July 1980	Tung Lung Chau		22°15′18″N 114°17′49″E	
M0010	Sam Tung Uk Village	Upload another image	13 March 1981	Tsuen Wan		22°22′19″N 114°07′13″E	
M0012	Old District Office North	Upload another image	13 November 1981	Tai Po	Now the New Territories Eastern Region Headquarters of The Scout Association of Hong Kong.	22°26′45″N 114°10′14″E	
M0013	Sheung Yiu Village	Upload another image	13 November 1981	Sai Kung		22°23′33″N 114°19′18″E	
M0016	Rock Carving at Lung Ha Wan	Upload another image	4 March 1983	Sai Kung		22°18′36″N 114°17′56″E	
M0017	Island House	Upload another image	4 March 1983	Yuen Chau Tsai		22°26′45″N 114°10′44″E	
M0018	Site of Chinese Customs Station	Upload another image	4 March 1983	Fat Tong Chau		22°16′49″N 114°16′02″E	
M0019	Man Lun Fung Ancestral Hall	Upload another image	4 March 1983	Fan Tin Tsuen, San Tin		22°29′59″N 114°04′28″E	
M0020	Remains of Pottery Kiln	Upload another image	15 April 1983	Wun Yiu Village			
M0023	Man Mo Temple	Upload another image	11 May 1984	Tai Po		22°26′56″N 114°09′52″E	
M0029	Old Tai Po Market Railway Station	Upload another image	23 November 1984	Tai Po		22°26′51″N 114°09′52″E	
M0030	Liu Man Shek Tong Ancestral Hall	Upload another image	18 January 1985	Mun Hau Tsuen, Sheung Shui		22°30′38″N 114°07′27″E	
M0031	Old House, Hoi Pa Village	Upload another image	25 July 1986	Tsuen Wan			
M0032	Tai Fu Tai Mansion	Upload another image	10 July 1987	San Tin			
M0033	Kun Lung Gate Tower	Upload another image	11 March 1988	Lung Yeuk Tau, Fanling			
M0034	Yeung Hau Temple	Upload another image	18 November 1988	Tung Tau Tsuen, Ha Tsuen		22°27′13″N 113°59′35″E	
M0039	Old House, Wong Uk Village	Upload another image	22 December 1989	Yuen Chau Kok, Sha Tin		22°22′58″N 114°11′50″E	
M0044	Kang Yung Study Hall	Upload another image	26 April 1991	Sheung Wo Hang, Sha Tau Kok			
M0047	Yi Tai Study Hall	Upload another image	26 June 1992	Shui Tau Tsuen, Kam Tin			
M0048	Enclosing Walls and Corner Watch Towers of Kun Lung Wai	Upload another image	8 April 1993	Lung Yeuk Tau, Fanling			
M0050	Entrance Tower of Ma Wat Wai	Upload another image	25 November 1994	Ma Wat Wai, Lung Yeuk Tau, Fanling		22°29′56″N 114°09′00″E	
M0061	I Shing Temple	Upload another image	14 June 1996	Tung Tau Wai, Wang Chau, Yuen Long		22°27′16″N 114°01′40″E	
M0064	Entrance Tower and Enclosing Walls of Lo Wai	Upload another image	31 January 1997	Lung Yeuk Tau, Fanling			
M0065	Tang Chung Ling Ancestral Hall	Upload another image	7 November 1997	Lung Yeuk Tau, Fanling			
M0066	Cheung Shan Monastery	Upload another image	31 December 1997	Ping Che, Fanling		22°31′45″N 114°10′32″E	
M0067	King Law Ka Shuk	Upload another image	21 July 1998	Tai Po Tau Tsuen, Tai Po			
M0068	Cheung Ancestral Hall	Upload another image	30 December 1999	Shan Ha Tsuen, Ping Shan, Yuen Long		22°25′56″N 114°00′59″E	
M0069	Fan Sin Temple	Upload another image	30 December 1999	Sheung Wun Yiu, Tai Po		22°26′13″N 114°09′50″E	
M0072	Tang Lung Chau Lighthouse	Upload another image	29 December 2000	Tang Lung Chau, Kap Shui Mun, Tsuen Wan			
M0073	Tang Ancestral Hall	Upload another image	14 December 2001	Ping Shan. Part of the Ping Shan Heritage Trail, Yuen Long			
M0074	Yu Kiu Ancestral Hall	Upload another image	14 December 2001	Ping Shan. Part of the Ping Shan Heritage Trail, Yuen Long			
M0075	Tsui Sing Lau Pagoda	Upload another image	14 December 2001	Ping Shan. Part of the Ping Shan Heritage Trail, Yuen Long		22°26′56″N 114°00′22″E	
M0076	Hung Shing Temple	Upload another image	15 November 2002	Kau Sai Chau, Sai Kung			
M0077	Tin Hau Temple	Upload another image	15 November 2002	Lung Yeuk Tau, Fanling, North			
M0078	Hau Ku Shek Ancestral Hall	Upload another image		Ho Sheung Heung, Sheung Shui, North			
M0079	The Morrison Building, Hoh Fuk Tong Centre	Upload another image	26 March 2004	28 Castle Peak Road, San Hui, Tuen Mun, Tuen Mun		22°23′48″N 113°58′43″E	
M0081	Leung Ancestral Hall	Upload another image	12 January 2007	Yuen Kong Tsuen, Pat Heung, Yuen Long			
M0082	Chik Kwai Study Hall	Upload another image	29 June 2007	Sheung Tsuen, Pat Heung, Yuen Long			
M0083	Tang Ancestral Hall	Upload another image	1 February 2008	Ha Tsuen Shi, Ha Tsuen, Yuen Long			
M0091	5 Historic Structures of Kowloon Reservoir	Upload another image	18 September 2009	Golden Hill Road, Kam Shan Country Park, Sha Tin			
M0092	Memorial Stone of Shing Mun Reservoir	Upload another image	18 September 2009	Kwai Tsing		22°23′10″N 114°08′50″E	
M0093	Residence of Ip Ting-sz	Upload another image	6 November 2009	Lin Ma Hang Tsuen, Sha Tau Kok, North			
M0094	Yan Tun Kong Study Hall	Upload another image	6 November 2009	Hang Tau Tsuen, Ping Shan, Yuen Long, Yuen Long			
M0097	Tang Kwong U Ancestral Hall	Upload another image	12 November 2010	No. 32 Shui Tau, Pak Wai Tsuen, Kam Tin, Yuen Long			
M0099	Fortified Structure at No. 55 Ha Pak Nai, Yuen Long	Upload another image	24 June 2011	No. 55 Ha Pak Nai, Yuen Long			
M0104	Fat Tat Tong	Upload another image	27 December 2013	Ha Wo Hang, Sha Tau Kok			
M0105	Tat Tak Communal Hall	Upload another image		North-west of Sheung Cheung Wai, Ping Shan	In the area covered by the Ping Shan Heritage Trail.		
M0123	Hau Mei Fung Ancestral Hall	Upload another image		Kam Tsin, Sheung Shui			
M0128	Old Tai Po Police Station	Upload another image	16 July 2021	Tai Po			
M0129	Hip Tin Temple	Upload another image	16 July 2021	Shan Tsui, Sha Tau Kok			
M0133	Tin Hau Temple, Joss House Bay	Upload another image	10 November 2023	Joss House Bay	Near other monument M0004 (Rock Inscription at Joss House Bay)		

=== Outlying Islands ===
Declared monuments in the Outlying Islands
#ID	Name	Photograph	Declaration date	Location	Description	Coordinates	Ref(s)
M0005	Rock Carving at Shek Pik	Upload another image	27 April 1979	Shek Pik, Lantau Island	Thought to date back to the local Bronze Age, some 3000 years ago.		
M0006	Rock Carvings on Po Toi	Upload another image	27 April 1979	Po Toi Island			
M0007	Tung Chung Fort	Upload another image	24 August 1979	Tung Chung, Lantau Island			
M0011	Fan Lau Fort	Upload another image	13 November 1981	Fan Lau, Lantau Island		22°11′54″N 113°51′05″E	
M0014	Rock Carvings on Cheung Chau	Upload another image	22 January 1982	Cheung Chau			
M0021	Stone Circle at Fan Lau	Upload another image	15 April 1983	Fan Lau, Lantau Island			
M0022	Tung Chung Battery	Upload another image	11 November 1983	Tung Chung, Lantau Island			
M0071	Waglan Lighthouse	Upload another image	11 November 1983	Waglan Island			
M0117	Yeung Hau Temple, Tai O	Upload another image		Tai O, Lantau Island		22°15′33″N 113°51′46″E	
M0136	Residence of Tang Pak Kau, Yuen Long	Upload another image	10 October 2024	Kam Tin, Yuen Long			

== See also ==
- List of buildings and structures in Hong Kong
- List of Grade I historic buildings in Hong Kong
- List of Grade II historic buildings in Hong Kong
- List of Grade III historic buildings in Hong Kong
- Heritage Trails in Hong Kong
- History of Hong Kong
