= Fat Tong Mun =

Channel in Sai Kung District of Hong Kong

Coordinates: 22.25966°N 114.29689°E

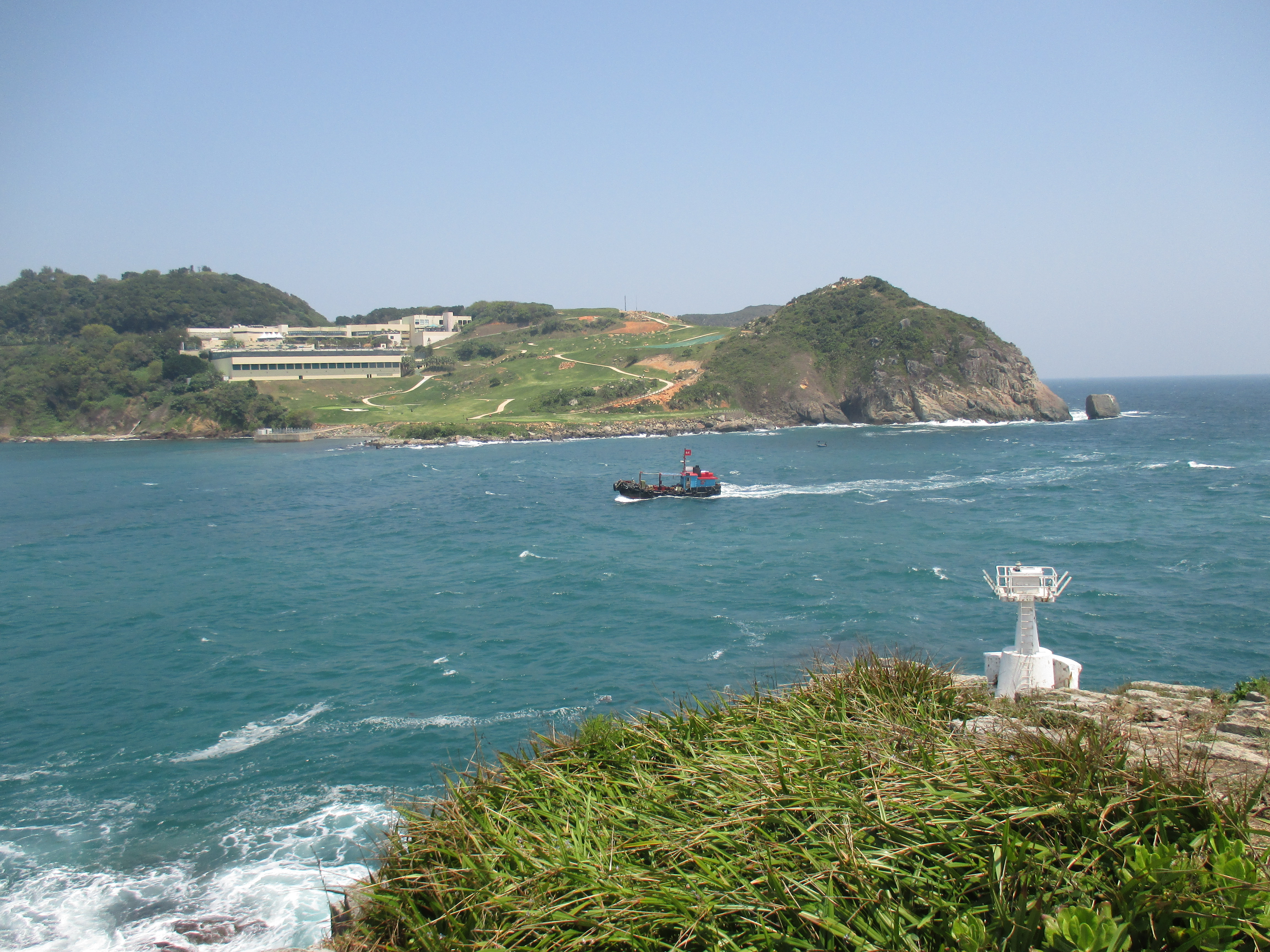
Clearwater Bay Golf & Country Club on Clear Water Bay Peninsula viewed from Tung Lung Chau across Fat Tong Mun.

Fat Tong Mun (Chinese: 佛堂門) is a channel in Sai Kung District of Hong Kong located between Joss House Bay (大廟灣), a bay in the southern tip of Clear Water Bay Peninsula, and the northern tip of Tung Lung Chau. The Tin Hau temple at Fat Tong Mun was established more than 700 years ago.

== See also ==
- List of channels in Hong Kong
- Tin Hau Temple, Joss House Bay
