= Fan Sin Temple =

Taoist temple in Hong Kong

- Chinese: 樊仙宮; Jyutping: faan4 sin1 gung1
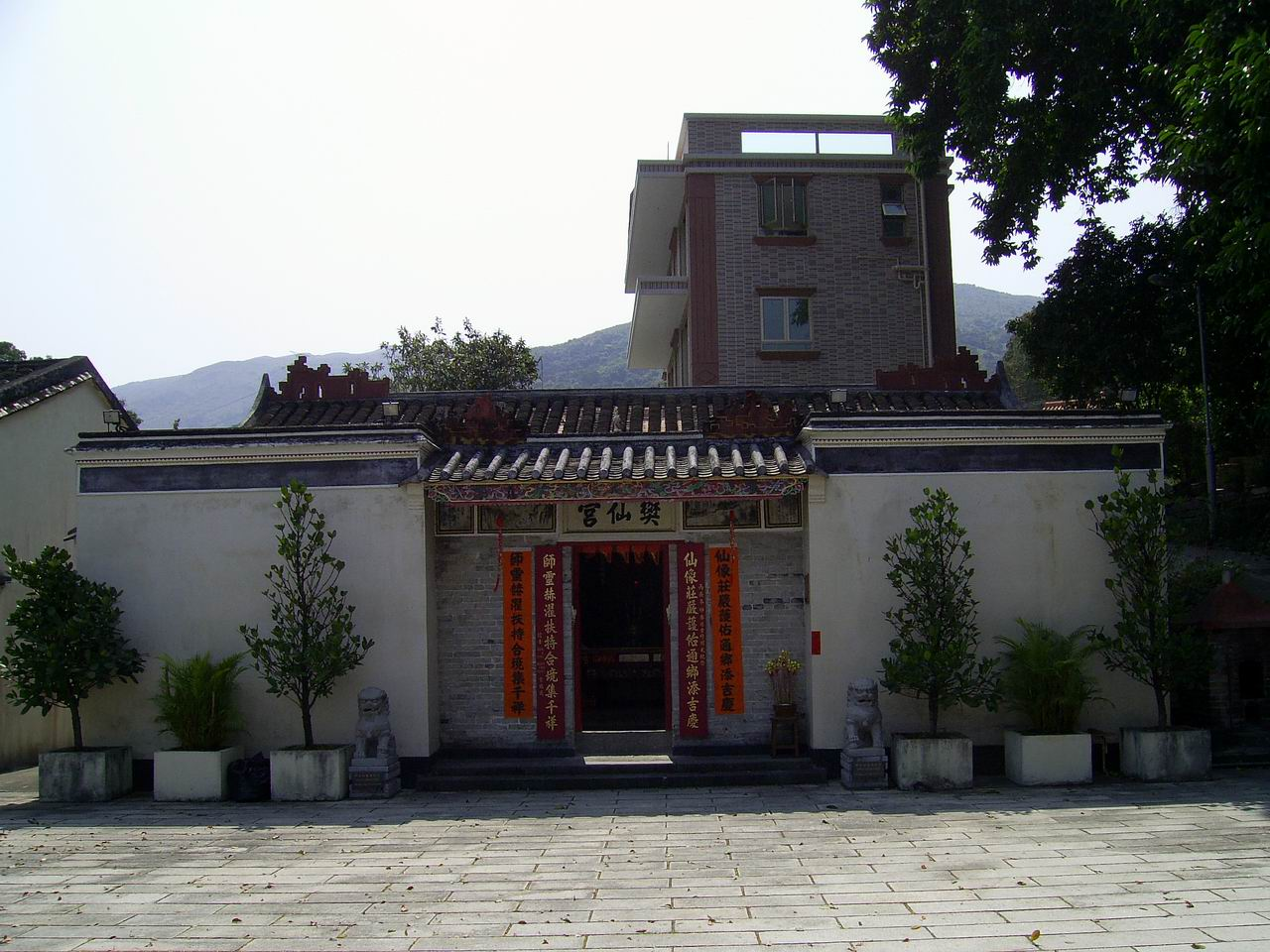
- Fan Sin Temple

- Location within Hong Kong

Religion
- Affiliation: Taoism
- Deity: Fan Tai Sin Sze

Location
- Location: Sheung Wun Yiu, Tai Po, Hong Kong
- Interactive map of Fan Sin Temple
- Coordinates: 22.43694°N 114.16400°E

Fan Sin Temple, alias "Fan Sin Kung" or "Fan Sin Miu" (Chinese: 樊仙宮; Jyutping: faan4 sin1 gung1), is a temple in Hong Kong, located in Sheung Wun Yiu, Tai Po. It was declared a monument on 30 December 1999.

== Overview ==
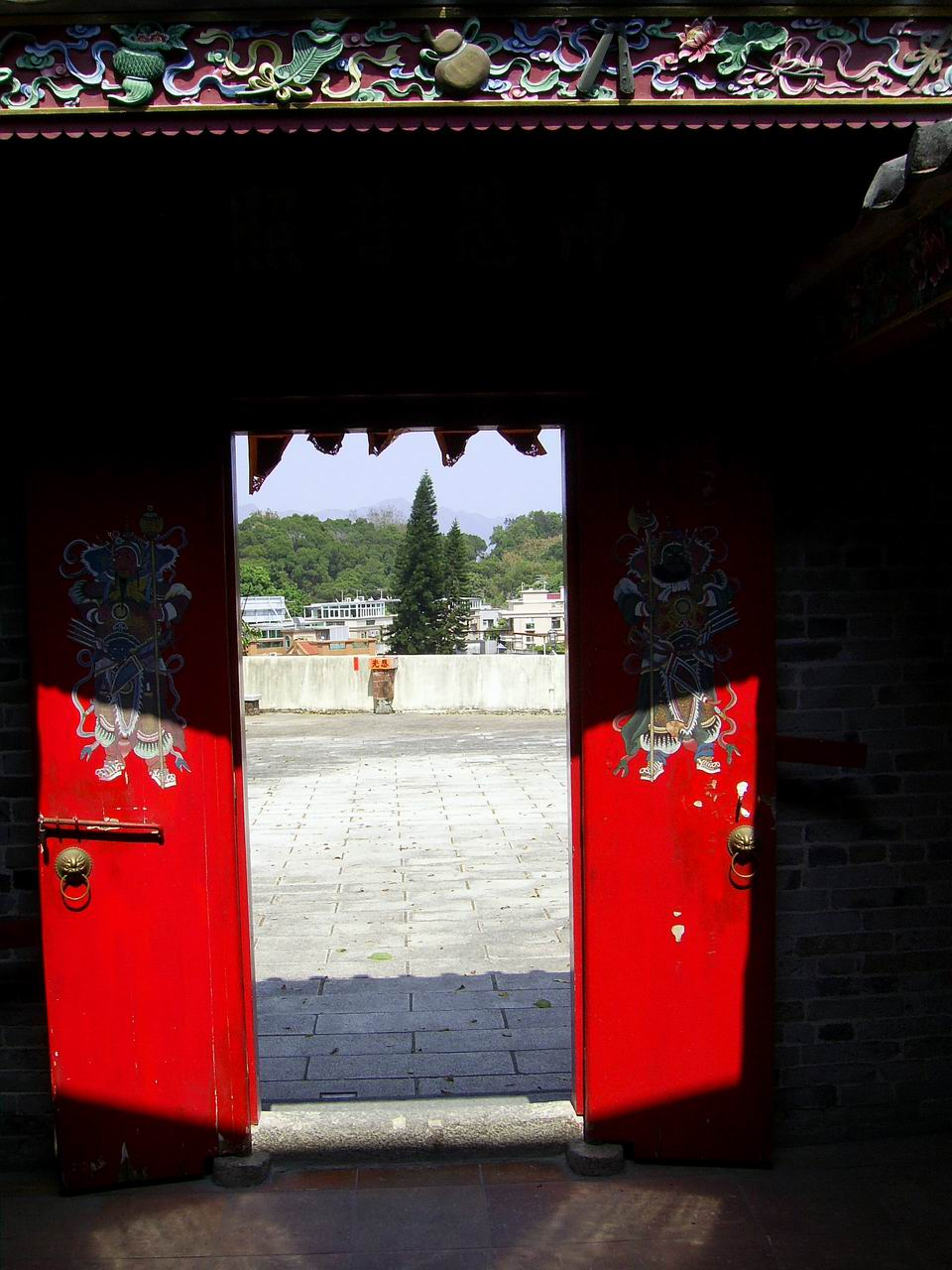
Fan Sin Temple

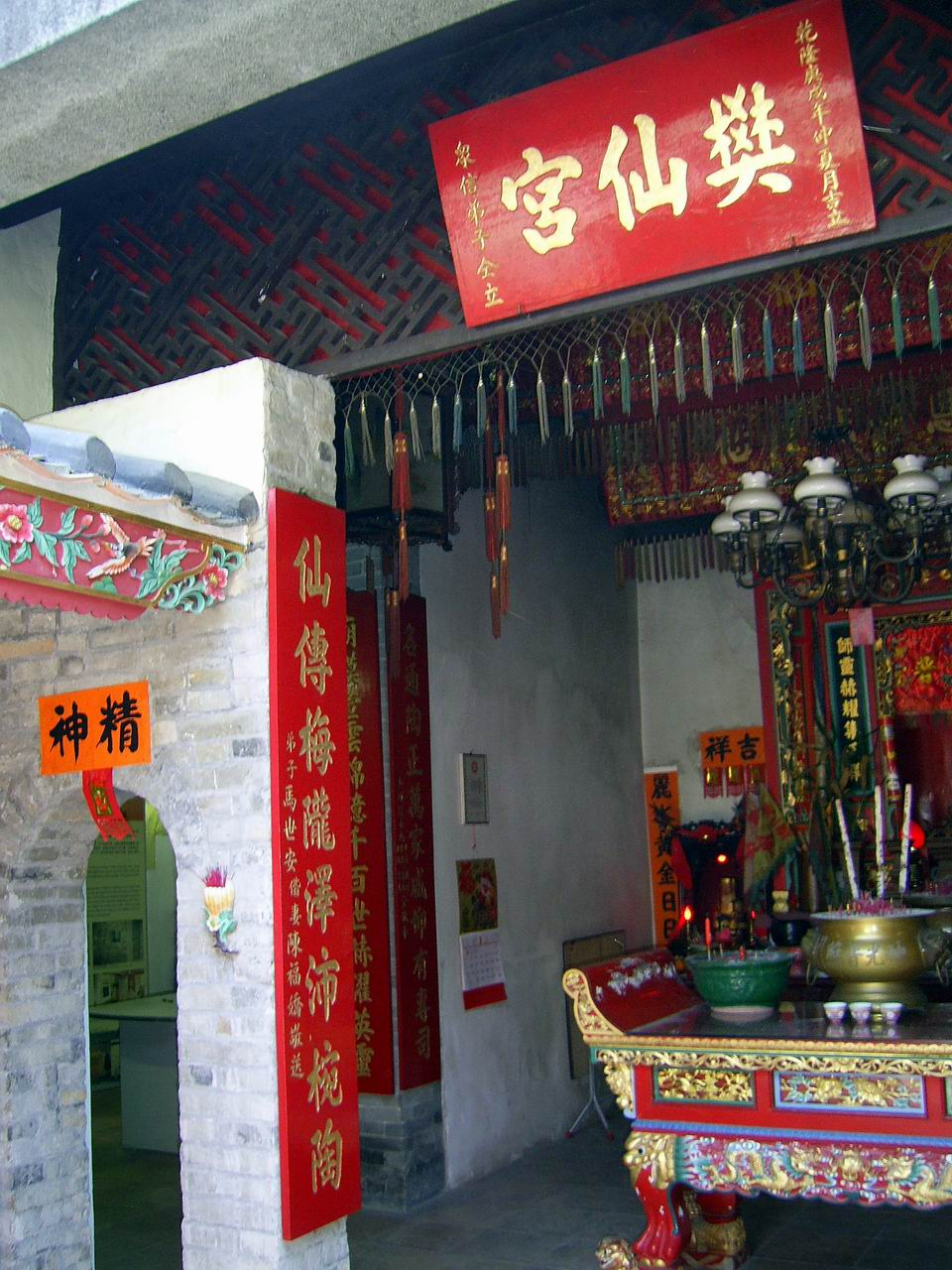
Fan Sin Temple

Fan Sin Temple is the main temple of the villages of the Sheung Wun Yiu and Ha Wun Yiu; it is the only one of its kind in Hong Kong.

It is uncertain when the temple was constructed. However, according to a wooden plaque, hanging in the main hall of the temple, the temple has a history of over 200 years as the plaque was carved in the geng-xu year of the Qianlong in the reign of the Qing Dynasty (1790). It is commonly believed that Fan Sin Temple was built by the Ma clan to worship Fan Tai Sin Sze, the patron saint of potters.

Windows with iron frameworks were installed on four sides of the temple after World War II.

Many historic relics of the temple were destroyed after a serious fire in mid 1970s. The calligraphy and paintings above the entrance were repainted during the renovation in 1976 after the fire. There is a wooden plaque from 1970 and four commemorative stone plaques which record the restorations in 1897, 1925, 1964 and 1976 respectively.

A further restoration of the temple has recently been carried out and it is now open to the public.
