= Tung Lung Chau =

Island in New Territories, Hong Kong

Coordinates: 22°14′57″N 114°17′23″E

東龍洲
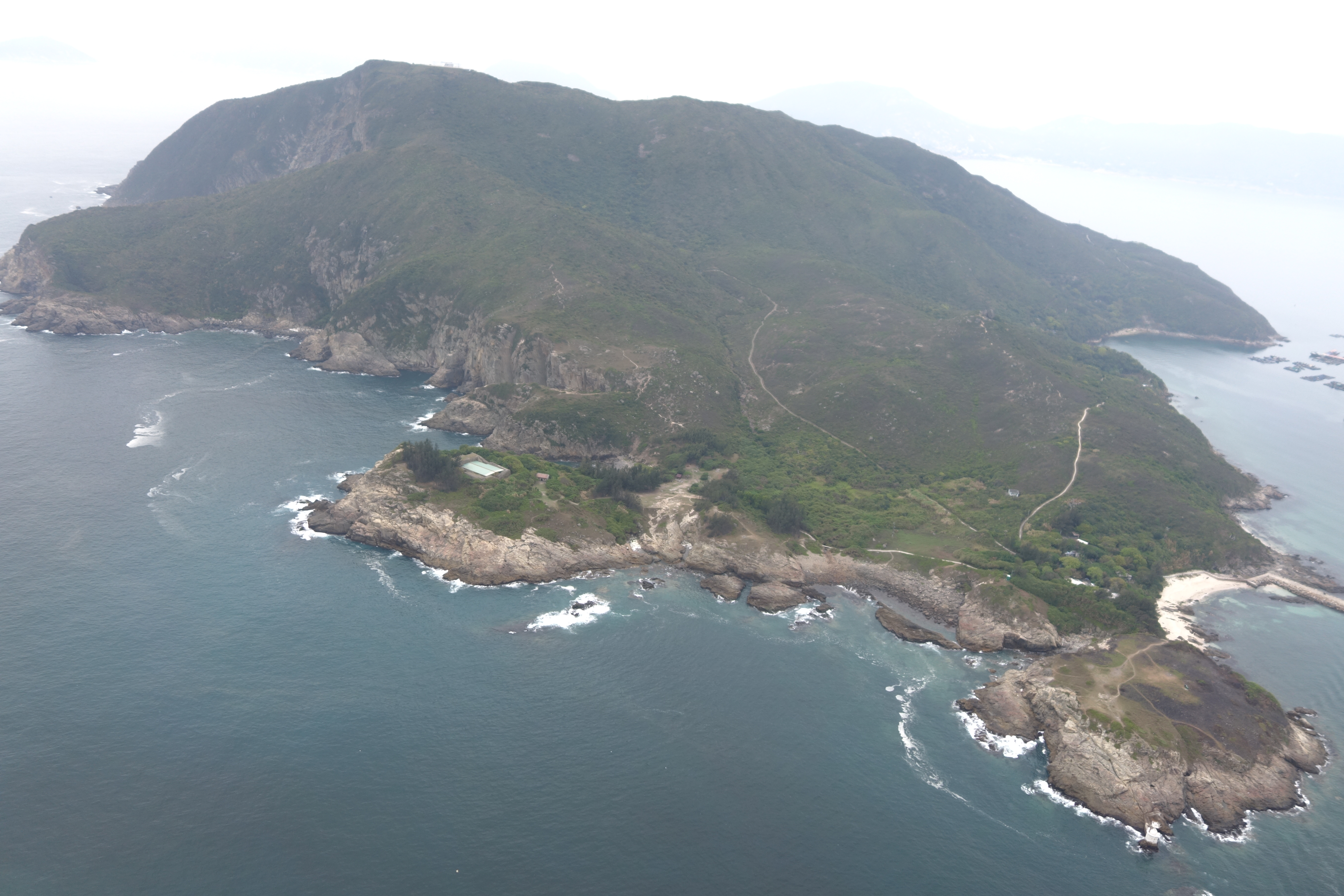
- Aerial view from Northeast

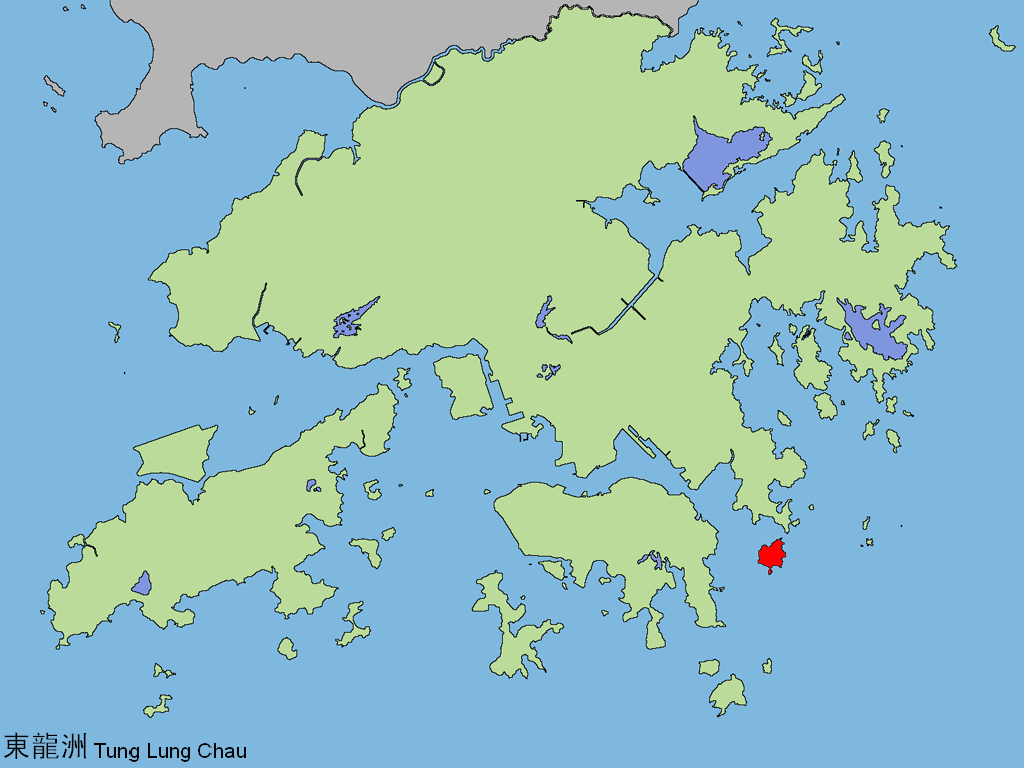
- Map of Hong Kong showing the location of Tung Lung Chau.

Geography
- Location: Fat Tong Mun
- Area: 2.42 km^{2} (0.93 sq mi)
- Highest elevation: 232 m (761 ft)

Administration
- Hong Kong

Tung Lung Chau
- Traditional Chinese: 東龍洲
- Simplified Chinese: 东龙洲
- Literal meaning: Eastern dragon island
Transcriptions
Standard Mandarin
- Hanyu Pinyin: Dōnglóng Zhōu
Yue: Cantonese
- Yale Romanization: Dūng lùhng jāu
- Jyutping: Dung^{1} lung^{4} zau^{1}

Nam Tong Island
- Traditional Chinese: 南堂島
Transcriptions
Standard Mandarin
- Hanyu Pinyin: Nántáng Dǎo
Yue: Cantonese
- Yale Romanization: Nàahm tòhng dóu
- Jyutping: Naam^{4} tong^{4} dou^{2}

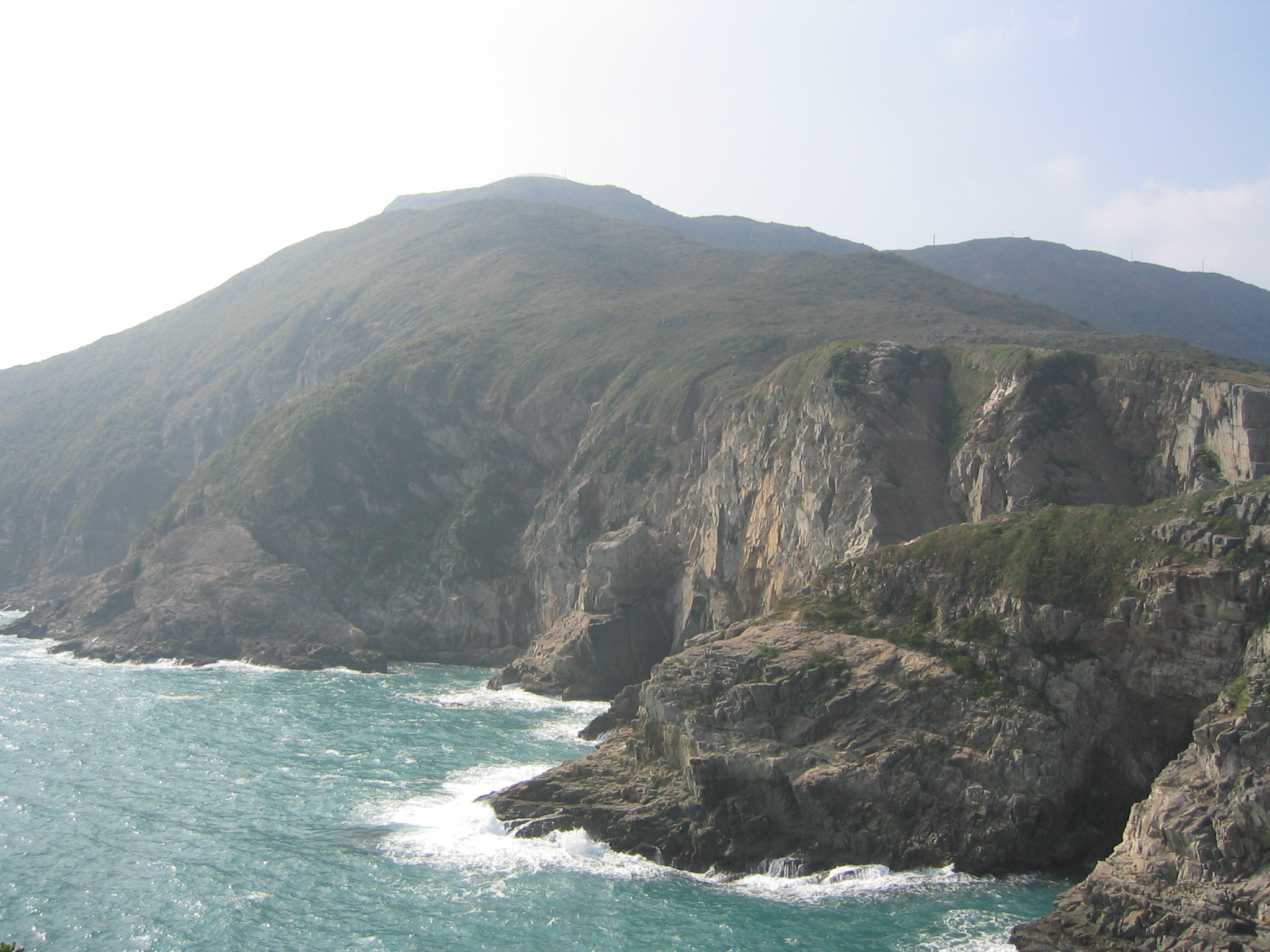
The cliffs on the east coast of Tung Lung Chau.

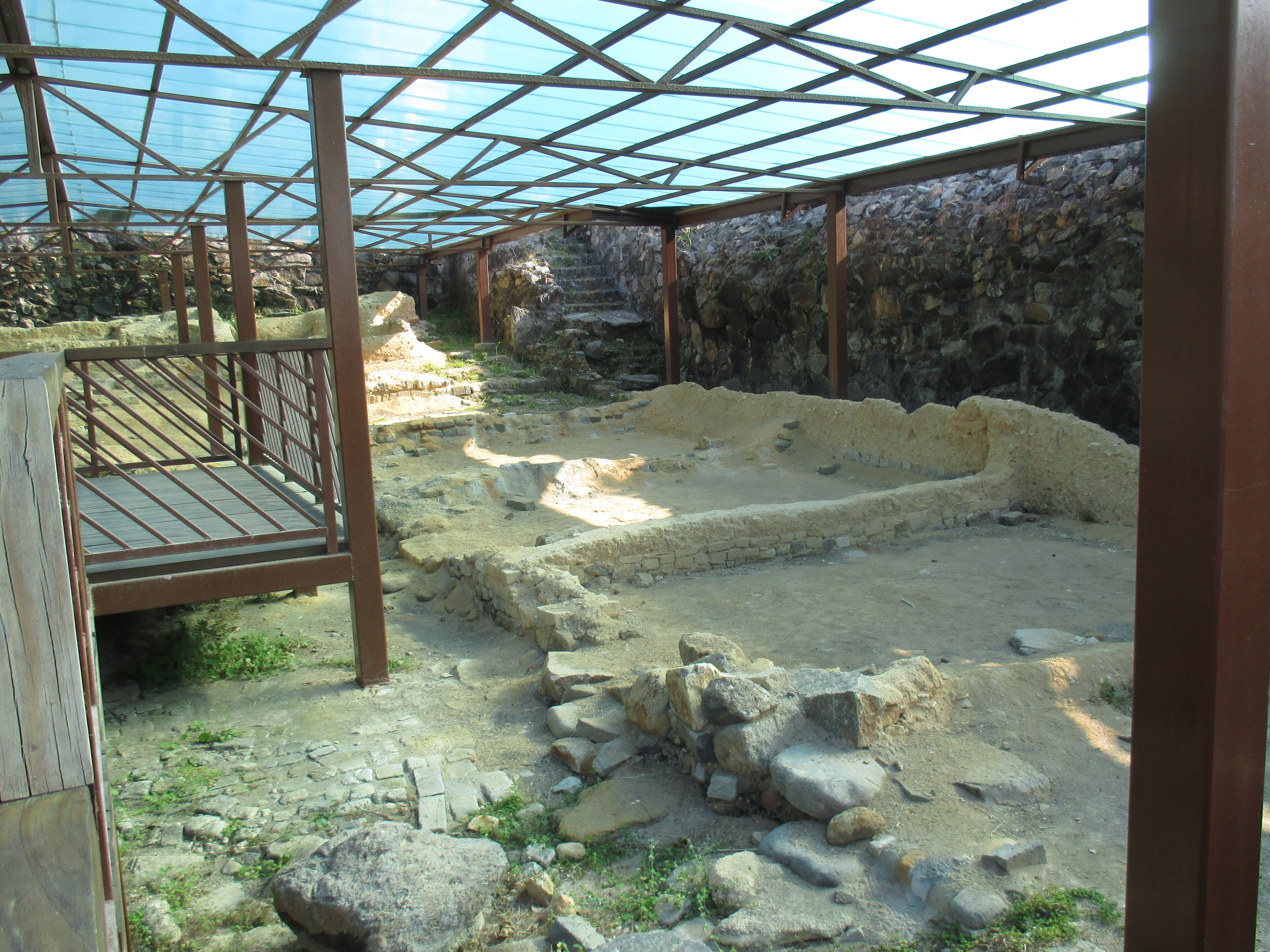
Tung Lung Fort.

Tung Lung Chau, previously known as Nam Tong Island or Nam Fat Tong is an island located off the tip of the Clear Water Bay Peninsula in the New Territories of Hong Kong. It is also referred to by Hong Kong people as Tung Lung To or Tung Lung Island (東龍島). The island is largely uninhabited. Administratively, it belongs to Sai Kung District.

== Geography ==
The island has an area of 2.42 square kilometres (0.93 square miles). It forms the eastern boundary of Tathong Channel, which leads into Victoria Harbour through Lei Yue Mun. The northern tip of Tung Lung Chau is separated from the southern tip of Clear Water Bay Peninsula by the narrow Fat Tong Mun Channel. The highest point of the island is at Nam Tong Peak (南堂頂), at an altitude of 250m.

== History ==
Emperor Duanzong of the Southern Song dynasty once stayed at Kwu Tap (古塔) on the island.

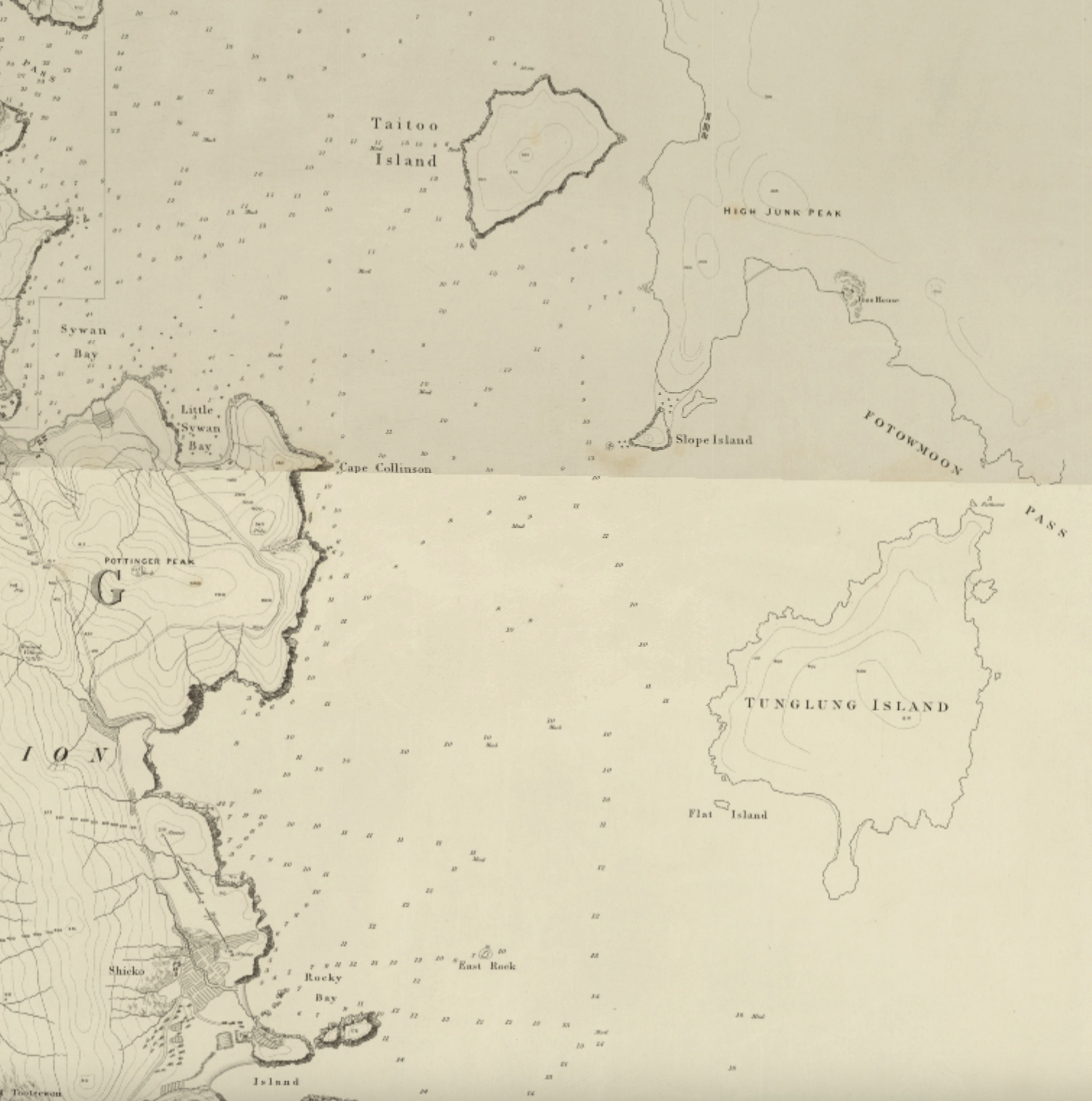
Hong Kong's Eastern Straits as surveyed in 1845.

The name of Tung Lung Chau (or Tunglung Island) was seen in maps since around 1845, superseding the once more prevalent romanization of Tam-too.

== Sights ==
Tung Lung Chau is the site of Tung Lung Fort, which was constructed 300 years ago and recently refurbished.

A prehistoric stone carving can also be found on the island. Measuring 180 cm by 240 cm, it is the largest ancient rock carving in Hong Kong. The stone carving was mentioned in the 1819 Gazetteer of Xin'an County.

There is a Hung Shing Temple on the island, at a location called Nam Tong (南堂). The temple was built before 1931. Inside the temple, a huge rock, called 'Holy Rock' (聖石) by the worshipers, is protruding from the rear wall of the right chamber.

A World War II Japanese small gun emplacement was located near Tathong Point (南堂尾, Nam Tong Mei), probably to guard Tathong Channel. It is believed that the existence of this facility may have been the reason why the Allies bombed the island.

== Rock climbing ==
Tung Lung houses some of the best sport climbing venues in Hong Kong.

- Technical Wall
- Sea Gully Wall

== Conservation ==
Tung Lung Fort Special Area was designated as a Special Area under country parks in 1979 and covers 3 hectares. The area contains the fort and a campsite.

Both Tung Lung Fort and the stone carving are declared monuments of Hong Kong.

== Transportation ==
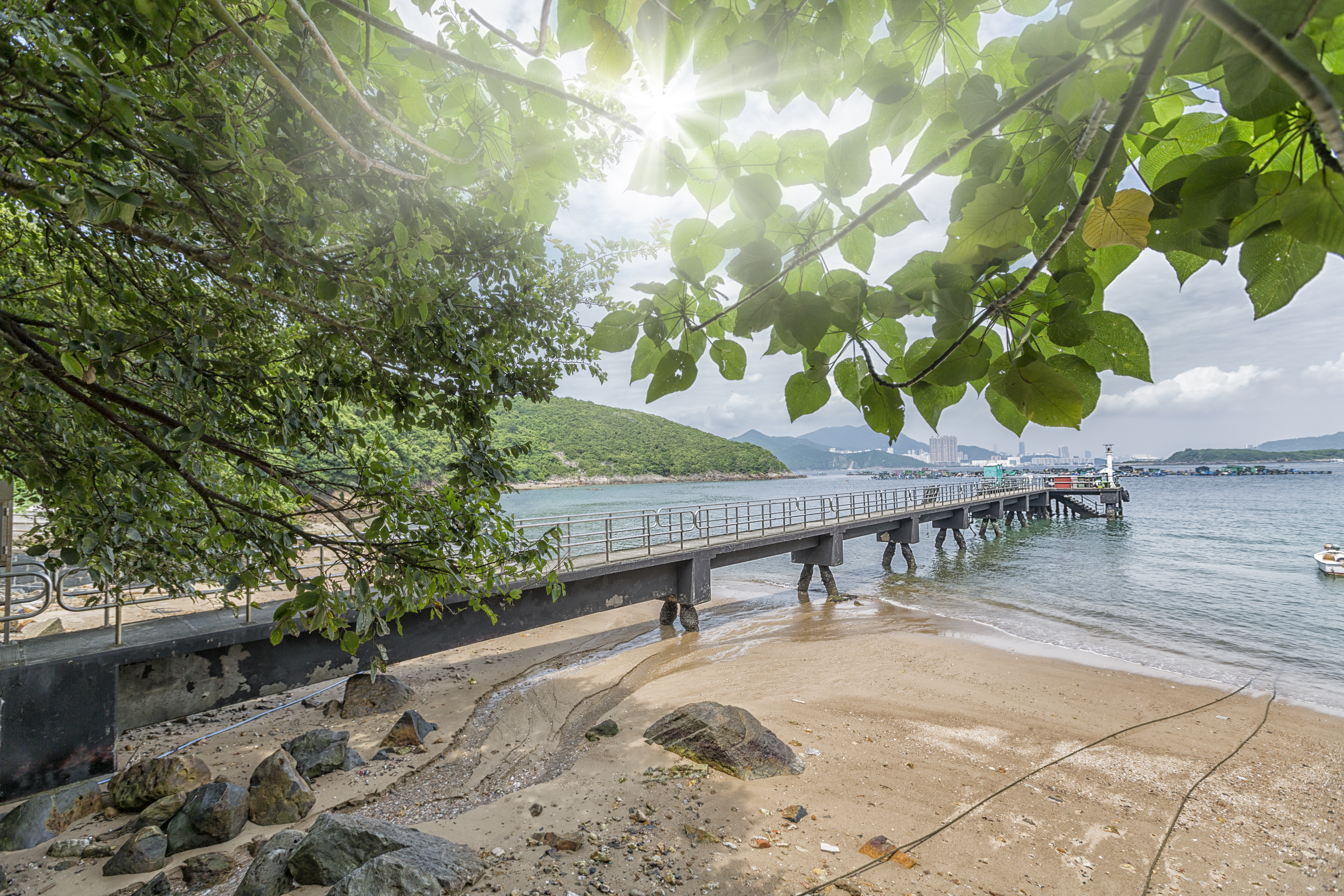
Tung Lung Chau Public Pier.

On weekends, kai-to service is available from Sam Ka Tsuen, near Lei Yue Mun (Kowloon side) and is operated by Coral Sea Ferry. The round-trip fare for the 30-minute journey was HK$45 in May 2020.

A service from Sai Wan Ho was operated by Lam Kee Ferry until 26 January 2014 and, after a hiatus of eight months, another operator resumed the service for a round-trip fare of HK$55 for adults and HK$40 for children aged 3 and above.

== See also ==
- Islands of Hong Kong
- March of Tung Lung To
