= Clearwater Bay Golf & Country Club =

Golf course in New Territories, Hong Kong

Clearwater Bay Golf and Country Club
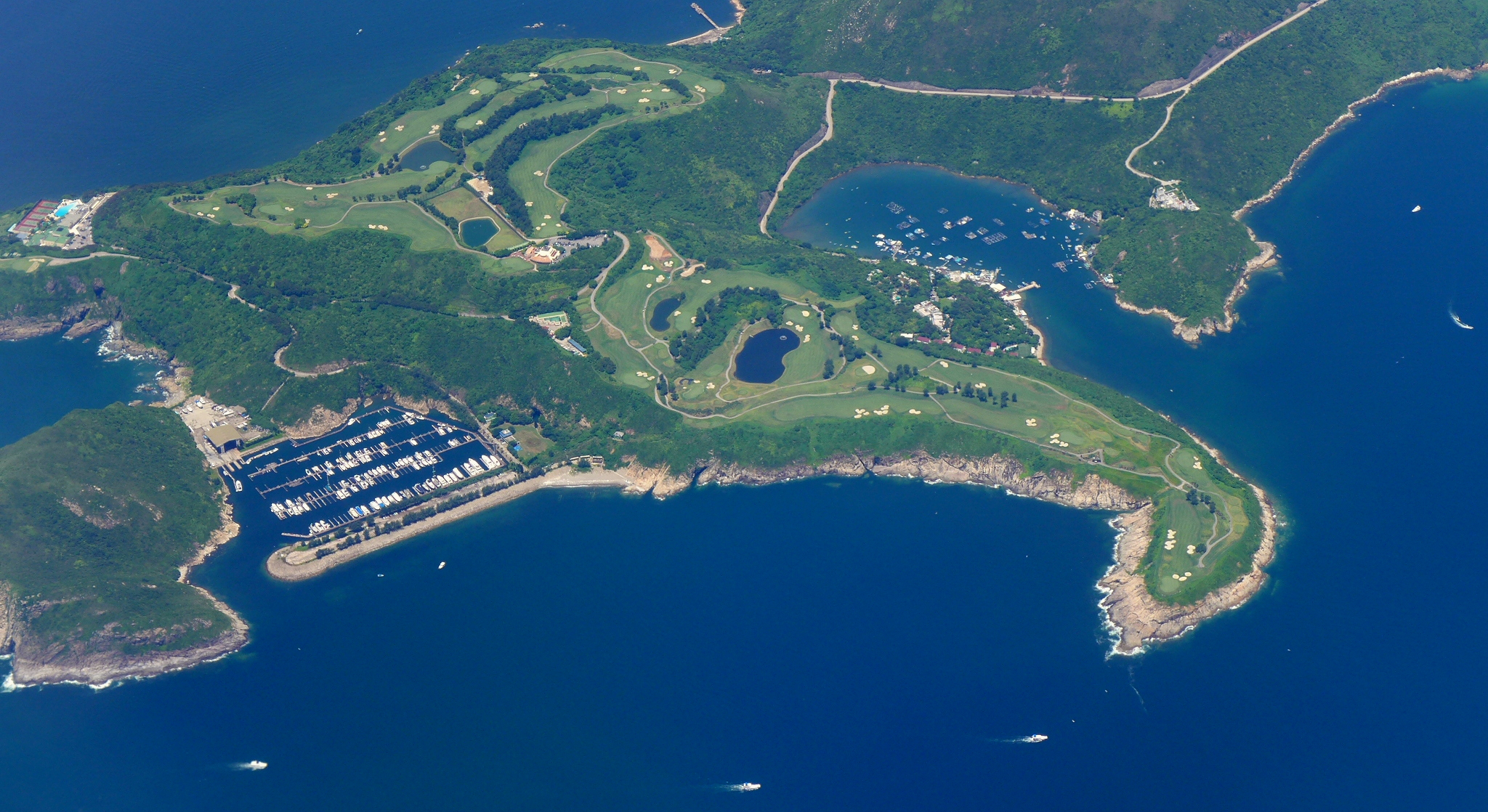
- Aerial view

- Location within Hong Kong
- 22.2707°N 114.2980°E

Club information
- Location: Clear Water Bay, New Territories, Hong Kong
- Established: 1982
- Type: Private
- Total holes: 18
- Website: www.cwbgolf.org
- Designed by: T. Sawai & A. Furukawa

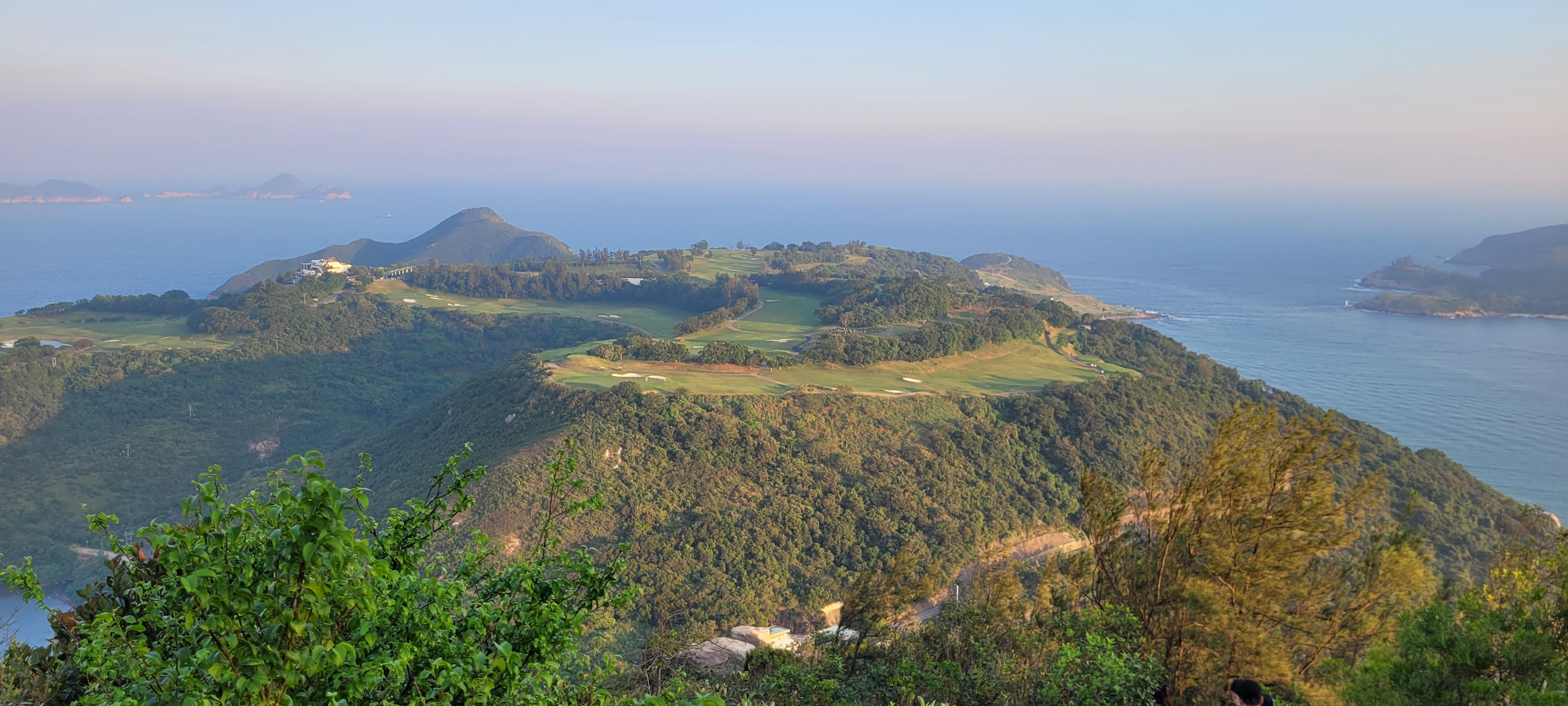
As viewed from High Junk Peak

The Clearwater Bay Golf & Country Club (Chinese: 清水灣高爾夫球會) is a privately owned and run, members-only country club, located on the Clear Water Bay Peninsula in Sai Kung, New Territories, Hong Kong.

The club hosts the PGA Tour China Clearwater Bay Open yearly.

== History ==
The Clearwater Bay Golf and Country Club was built at a cost of about HK$250 million by a number of wealthy people including Kenneth Fung, Run Run Shaw, and Yue-Kong Pao. Environmentalists criticised the project for the environmental damage the construction inflicted on the peninsula. A report by the Hong Kong Government agreed, claiming that the methods used for construction of the club and access roads had resulted in "unnecessary scars". It also called the access roads a "major eyesore visible over a wide area". Members of the government's Environmental Protection Advisory Committee accused the club of having little regard for the environment.

On the morning of 4 November 1982, the club was attacked by six masked arsonists who assaulted a security guard and set a maintenance shed ablaze, destroying about $2 million worth of machinery, including tractors, buggies, and lawnmowers. The incident slightly delayed the club's opening. It eventually opened in December 1982. The first phase included a nine-hole course.

Heavily indebted, the club opened when Hong Kong's economy was faltering due to fears over the 1997 handover to China. The club struggled to attract members, and went bankrupt in 1983 and closed. It reopened on 18 April 1984 after cutting staff levels and receiving a $6 million injection from a member. It began making a profit in 1985.

The club was accused of racial discrimination in 2018 after signage was posted barring domestic helpers from the poolside area.

== Facilities ==
Aside from the golf course, the club has various other facilities including a driving range, putting green, gym, spa, outdoor swimming pool, tennis courts, table-tennis room, badminton courts, squash courts, basketball court, football pitch, children's playground, and indoor playroom. It also has several dining venues and retail shops.

== Membership ==
New members could buy into one of the six types of membership by purchasing units of the club's debenture after passing a very stringent character check. Price starts from a little under HK$500,000 and could reach HK$3,500,000. Members are also required to pay an additional subscription fee each year.

Type of membership:

1. Company Golf
2. Individual Golf
3. Company Country Club
4. Individual Country Club
5. Company Marina
6. Individual Marina

== Events ==
It has hosted various local and international events and tournaments, such as the PGA Tour China Clearwater Bay Open, the World Amateur Team Championships, Hong Kong Tennis Champions Cup, and Sport for All Day.
