= Clear Water Bay Peninsula =

Peninsula in Sai Kung District, Hong Kong

Coordinates: 22.30149°N 114.27086°E

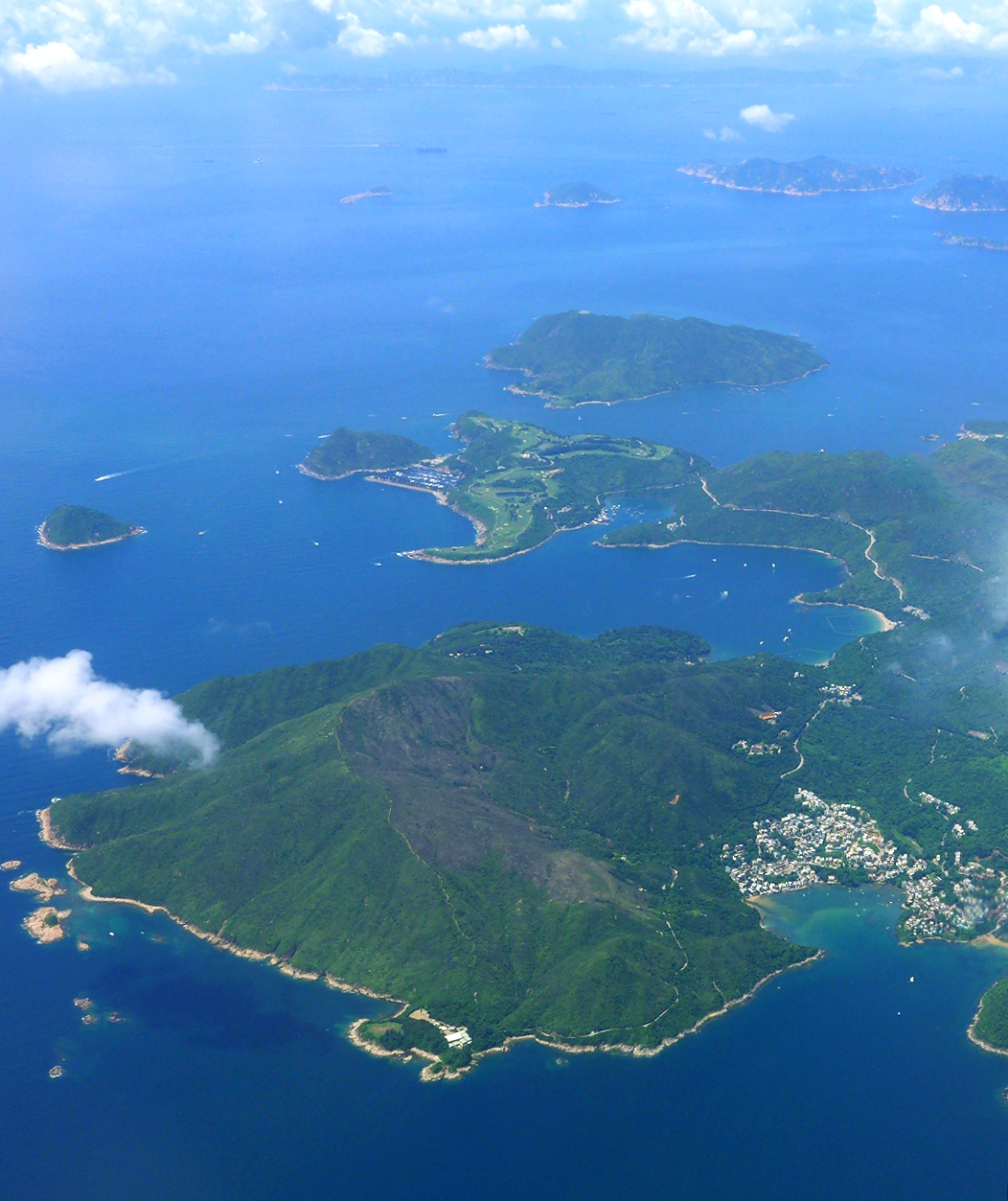
- A bird's-eye view of southern part of Clear Water Bay Peninsula
- Interactive map of Clear Water Bay Peninsula

Geography
- Location: Sai Kung District, Hong Kong
- Highest elevation: 344 m (1129 ft)
- Highest point: High Junk Peak

Clear Water Bay Peninsula
- Traditional Chinese: 清水灣半島
- Simplified Chinese: 清水湾半岛
Transcriptions
Standard Mandarin
- Hanyu Pinyin: Qīngshuǐwān Bàndǎo
Yue: Cantonese
- Yale Romanization: Chīng séui wāan bun dóu
- Jyutping: Cing1 seoi2 waan1 bun3 dou2

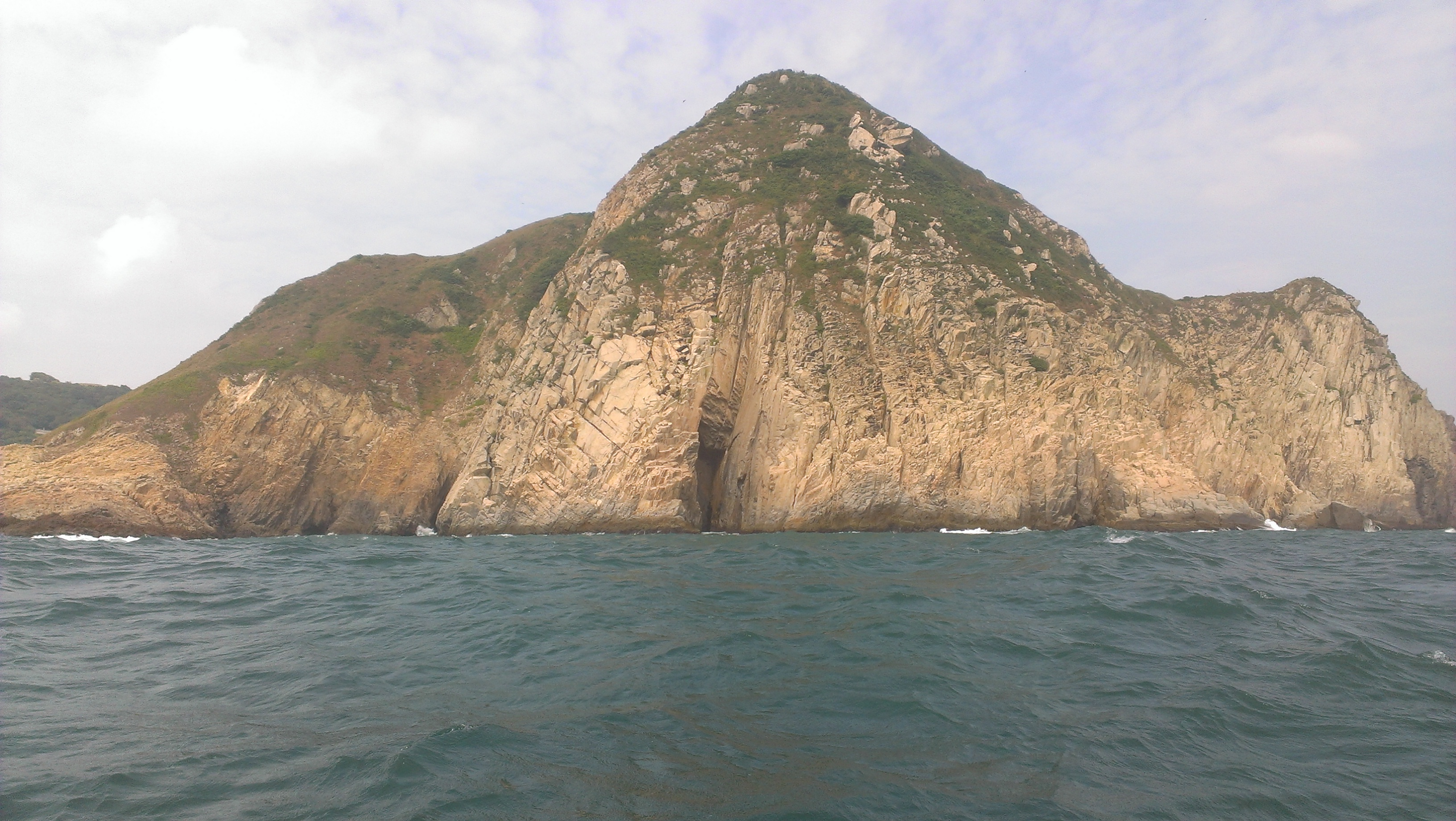
Po Keng Teng located in SE corner of the peninsula

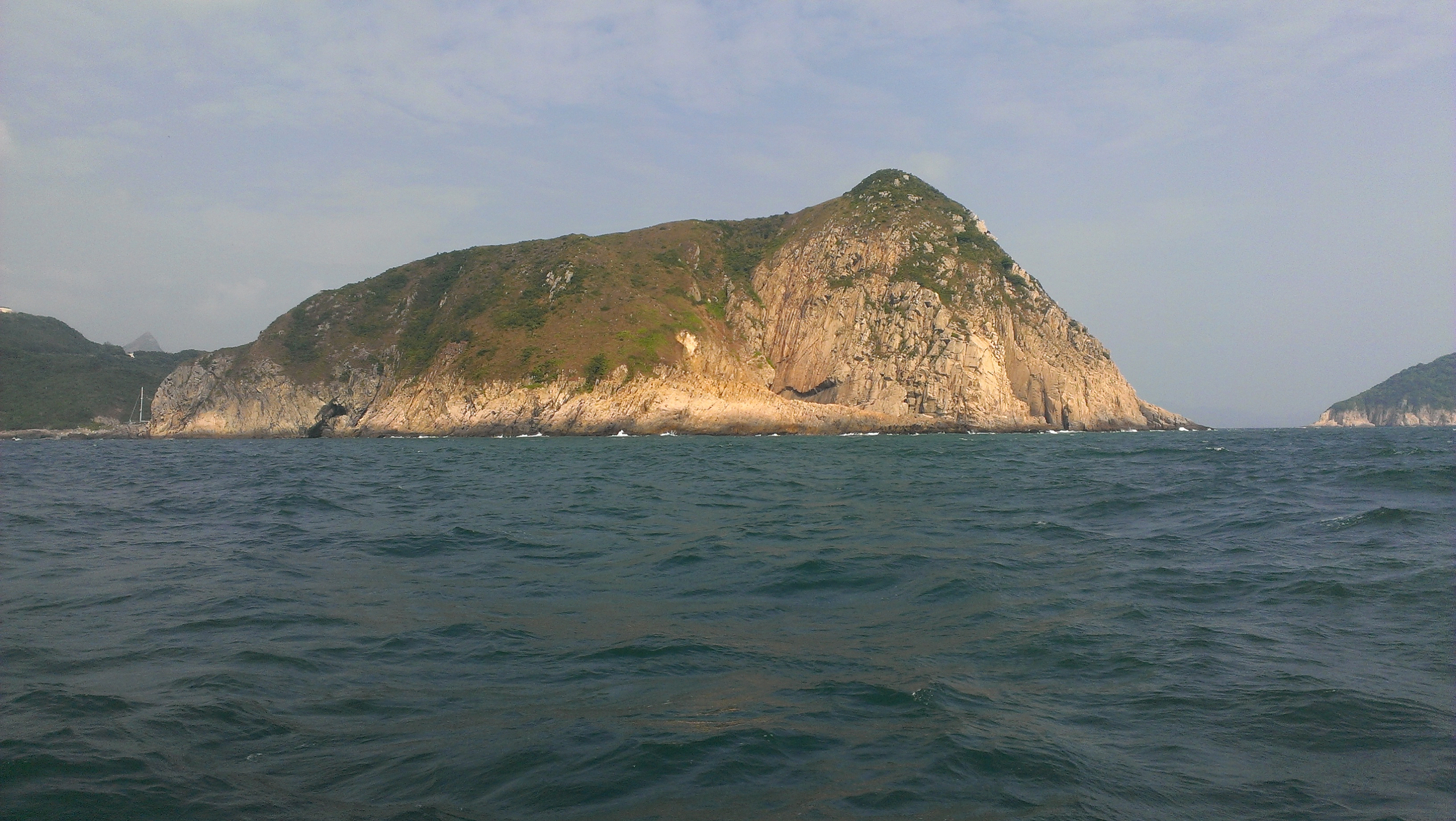
Po Keng Teng (centre) and Steep Island (right) off the coast and High Junk Peak can be seen on far left background

Clear Water Bay Peninsula (Chinese: 清水灣半島), is a peninsula in Sai Kung District, Hong Kong. The peninsula separates Junk Bay from Port Shelter. The highest accessible point is the summit of High Junk Peak.

== Features ==
The Clearwater Bay Golf & Country Club and the Shaw Studio are located here. TVB's headquarters, TV City, were previously located here but have since moved to Tseung Kwan O Industrial Estate.

== Education ==
- Clearwater Bay School - A P to 6 ESF (English Schools Foundation) School.
- Sam Yuk Middle School (三育中學)

== Public beaches ==
- Clear Water Bay First Beach
- Clear Water Bay Second Beach
- Silverstrand Beach

== Transportation ==
- Clear Water Bay Road
- Hang Hau Road (坑口道)
- Tai Au Mun Road (大坳門路)
- Po Toi O Chuen Road (布袋澳村路)
