= Peaked Hill (Hong Kong) =

Island in New Territories, Hong Kong

雞翼角
- Interactive map of Peaked Hill

Geography
- Location: West of Lantau Island
- Coordinates: 22°12′59″N 113°50′13″E
- Length: 1.21 km (0.752 mi)
- Highest elevation: 69 m (226 ft)

Administration
- Hong Kong

Demographics
- Population: 0

Kai Yet Kok
- Traditional Chinese: 雞翼角
- Simplified Chinese: 鸡翼角
- Literal meaning: Chicken Wing Point
Transcriptions
Standard Mandarin
- Hanyu Pinyin: Jīyìjiǎo
Yue: Cantonese
- Yale Romanization: Gāi yihk gok
- Jyutping: Gai^{1} jik^{6} gok^{3}

Peaked Hill, also known as Kai Yet Kok (Chinese: 雞翼角; lit. 'the headland of chicken wing') and Kai Shan (雞山), is a stack island on the westernmost point on land of Hong Kong territories. The island is close to the west side of southwest Lantau Island, near Tsin Yue Wan (煎魚灣) and can be spotted from the 7th stage of Lantau Trail between Fan Lau and Yi O.

== Geography ==
The island is connected to Lantau Island by a tombolo, a natural sandbar that is walkable at low tide.

The island is north of Lantau Channel and affected by the current from the Pearl River. West of the island are the territories of mainland China.

== Fauna ==
Coastal waters of the Southwest Lantau Marine Park, stretching from Kai Kung Shan, Peaked Hill to Fan Lau, is one of the areas with the highest density of Chinese White Dolphins in Hong Kong.

== See also ==
- List of islands and peninsulas of Hong Kong
- Outlying Islands
