= Prehistoric Hong Kong =

Time period in Hong Kong's history

Prehistoric Hong Kong is the period between the arrival of the first humans in Hong Kong and the start of recorded Chinese history during the Han dynasty. The history of the southern region (which may possibly include Hong Kong) is reckoned to have been first recorded in 214 BC with Qin Shi Huang conquering the Baiyue and creating the Jiaozhou province.

The prehistorical period can be divided into Stone Age and Bronze Age. Archaeology evidence suggests the earliest human settlement was in the Wong Tei Tung area dating back to 38,000 BC.

== Stone Age ==
=== Palaeolithic ===
Evidence of an Upper Paleolithic settlement in Hong Kong was found at Wong Tei Tung in Sham Chung beside the Three Fathoms Cove in Sai Kung Peninsula. There were 6000 artefacts found in a slope in the area and jointly confirmed by the Hong Kong Archaeological Society and Centre for Lingnan Archaeology of Zhongshan University. It is believed that the Three Fathom Cove was a river valley during that period and ancient people collected stone tools from the lithic manufacturing site in Wong Tei Tung to the settlement in near Tolo Harbour and Mirs Bay.

=== Neolithic ===
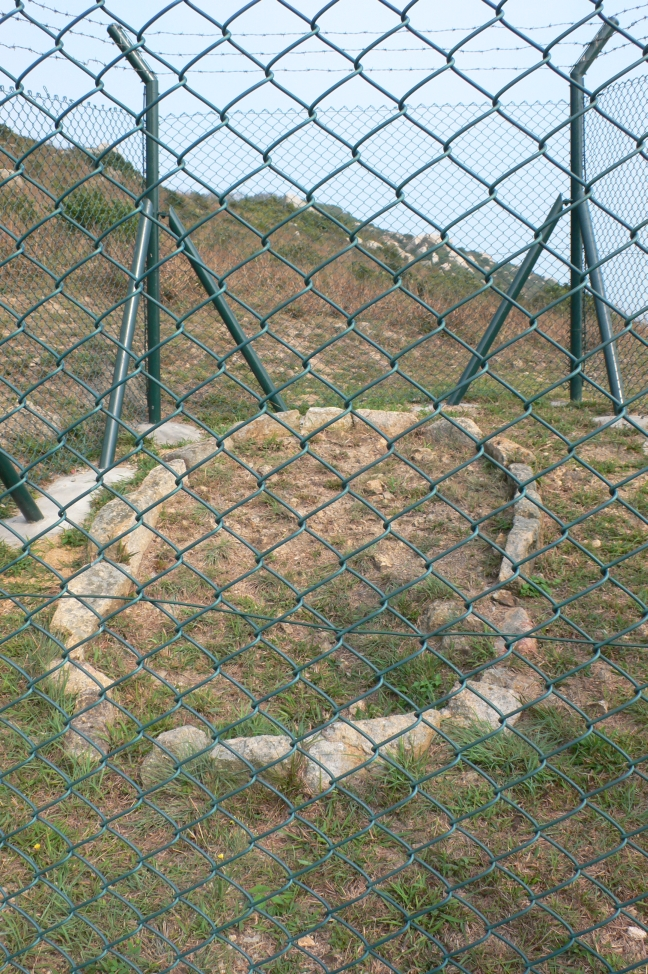
Stone Circle in Fan Lau

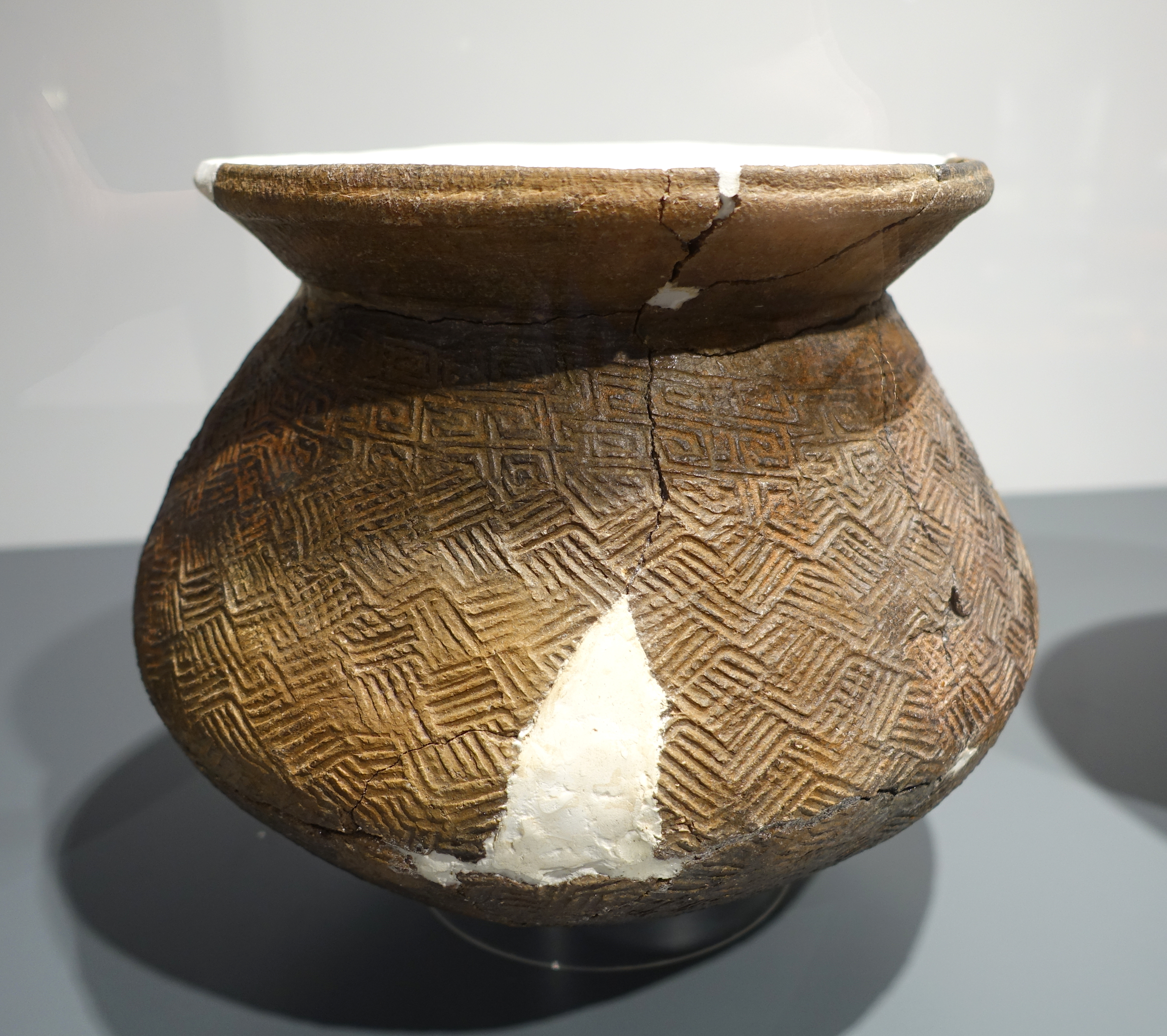
Late Neolithic pottery found in Tung Wan Tsai, Ma Wan. Hong Kong Museum of History

The Neolithic Era began approximately 7,000 years ago in Hong Kong. Excavations of Tung Wan Tsai North (Ma Wan) and Sha Tau Kok reveal evidence of pottery during this time, but it does not reveal if there was pottery before this time due to the lack of absolute dates. The Neolithic period in this area was divided into four different phases. Phase one was when the Neolithic era began around 7000 years ago. The second phase was around 6500–6000 BP when white and painted chalkware were present along with ground adzes and axes along with flaked points. The third phase began around 6000–5000 BP, identified by white chalkware with incisions and shouldered stone implements. The final phase was around 5000–3500 BP with the presence of pottery with geometric patterns, stepped adze, shouldered adze and more ground stone implements.

Hong Kong is located on the coast of South China. Unlike northern China, the settlers in this area were the Che people (Chinese: 輋族). Excavated Neolithic artefacts suggest a difference from northern Chinese Stone-Age cultures, including the Longshan. Excavated sites in Hong Kong were largely located on the western shores of Hong Kong. This location was most likely chosen to avoid strong winds from the southeast and to collect food from the nearby shores. Settlement can be found in Cheung Chau, Lantau Island and Lamma Island.

Evidences of using fire were found from Chung Hom Kok on the Hong Kong Island. In late Neolithic, their settlement extends from shores to the hills nearby.

Stone circles were found in Fan Lau and other areas in Hong Kong. Its purpose is still unidentified but some suggests it is related to worship.

== Bronze Age ==
The coming of the Warring States period brought an influx of Yue people from the north into the area, prob who probably migrated south to avoid the instabilities in the north. Bronze mining, fishing, combat, and ritual tools were excavated on Lantau Island and Lamma Island. Ma Wan was the earliest settlement with direct evidence in Hong Kong. Another one is Lung Kwu Tan. Bronze tools were found on Lantau Island, Cheung Chau, Chek Lap Kok as well. Regular holes on the ground were found in Ha Pak Nai. It is believed they were the foundations of grand houses of that period.

The Yuet people competed and assimilated with the indigenous Che people. It is believed that there were wars between them. Qin Shi Huang of the Qin dynasty sent large numbers of soldiers and Qin subjects to Guangdong, which toughened the competition. According to recent archaeological findings, there were possibly many significant differences between the Yue civilisation and the Qin and Han dynasties. According to the historical records written during the Han dynasty, the Yue people (who originated in the Southern region of the current China along the Pearl River) were mainly barbarians with little or no civilisation. However, there is archaeological evidence suggesting that the Yue civilisation was sophisticated and advanced.

There are still no written documents or artefacts related to Qin rule and early Han dynasty rule. The excavation of Lei Cheng Uk Han Tomb of later Han dynasty effectively brings Hong Kong out of prehistory.

=== Rock Carvings ===
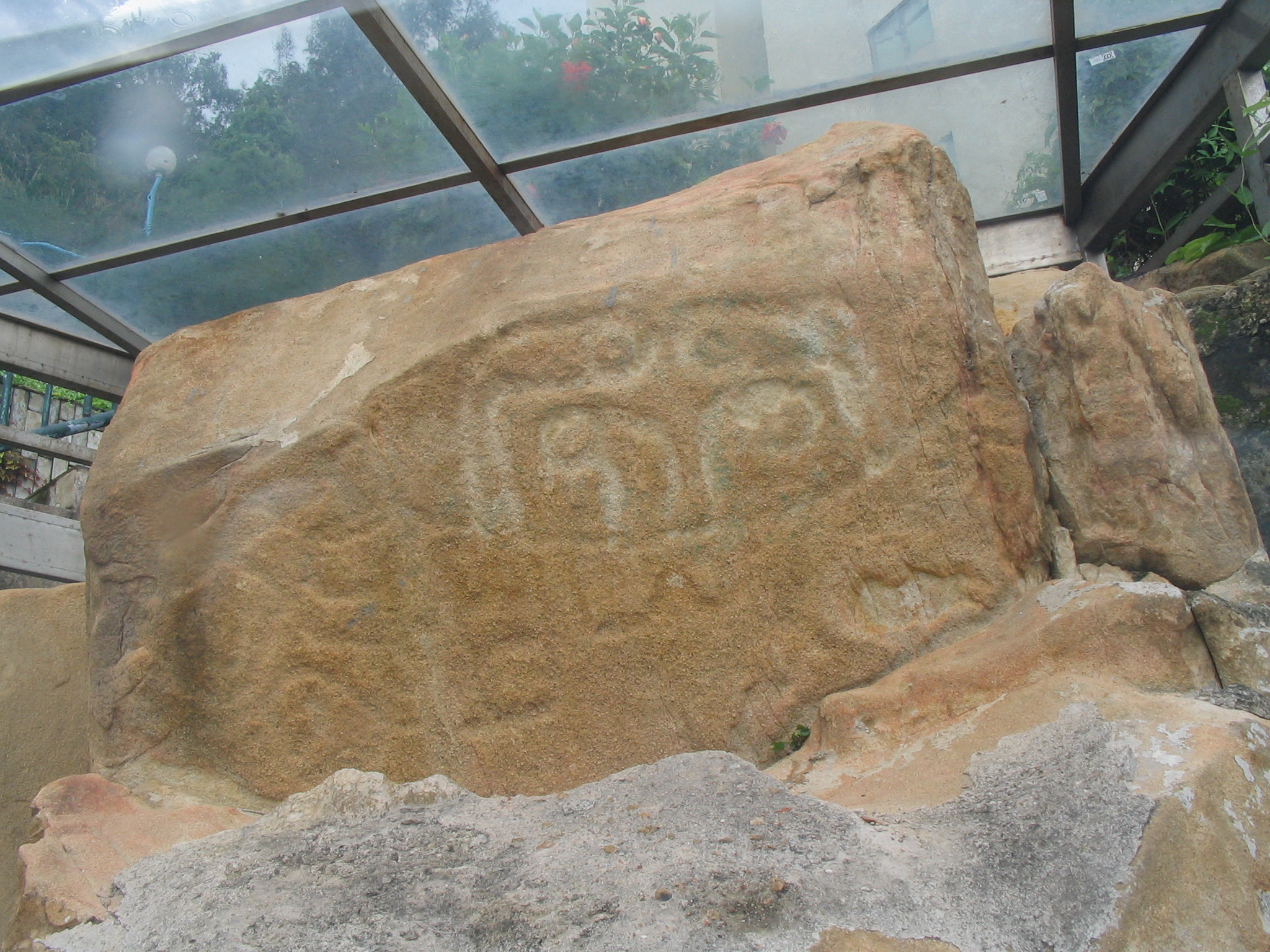
Rock carving on Cheung Chau, 3000-year-old rock carving discovered in 1970 east of the island below Warwick Hotel. It consists of two groups of similar carved lines surrounding small depressions

Nine rock carvings have been discovered and are listed as declared monuments:

- Big Wave Bay on Hong Kong Island
- Cape Collinson on Hong Kong Island. Discovered in October 2018.
- Cheung Chau
- Kau Sai Chau
- Lung Ha Wan in Sai Kung District
- Po Toi Island
- Shek Pik on Lantau Island
- Tung Lung Island
- Wong Chuk Hang

All are believed to date back to what was the Bronze Age, which, in northern China, approximately corresponds to the Shang dynasty in China. The carvings are also believed to have been intended to pacify the bad weather.

== Prehistoric sites ==
Besides the stones circles and the rock carvings, several prehistoric sites have been studied in Hong Kong. They include:

- Ma Wan – Prehistoric remains have been found from the Mid-Neolithic Age (about 3000 BC), the late Neolithic Age (about 2000 BC), the early to late Bronze Age of coastal South China (1500–500 BC).
- Wong Tei Tung, on the Sai Kung Peninsula
- Other excavations of the Hong Kong Archaeological Society

== See also ==
- Hong Kong Museum of History
