= Po Toi Lighthouse =

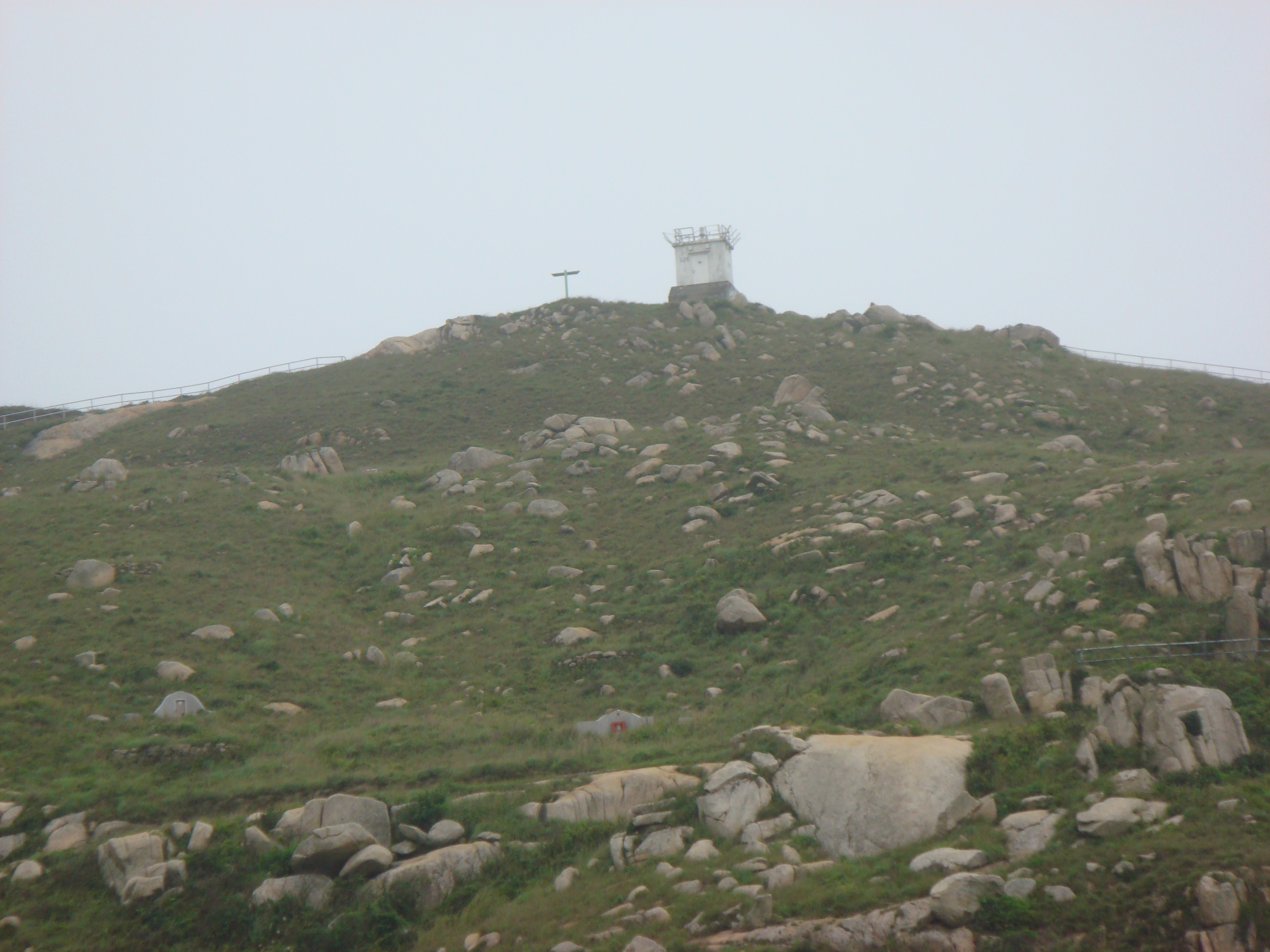
- Po Toi Lighthouse
- Location: New Territories; Hong Kong
- Coordinates: 22°9′25.4″N 114°15′27.6″E

Tower
- Constructed: 1970
- Construction: concrete building
- Height: 6 metres (20 ft)
- Shape: 1-storey equipment building with light on the top
- Markings: white building

Light
- First lit: 1970
- Focal height: 67 metres (220 ft)
- Lens: Pharos Marine FA-250LED
- Range: 18 nautical miles (33 km; 21 mi)
- Characteristic: Fl W 10s.
- Hong Kong no.: HK-126

Po Toi Lighthouse, also known as Nam Kok Tsui lighthouse or Lighthouse 126, is an active light on Po Toi, the main island of the Po Toi Islands group, Hong Kong.

The light was constructed and lit in 1970. The structure is a concrete equipment building with gallery and a light on the top. Located on the top of a hill, on the southeast side of a pointed peninsula along the "Po Toi Country Trail", there is a long flight of stairs with a railing leading to the top, it is the southernmost lighthouse in Hong Kong.

== See also ==
- Islands of Hong Kong
- List of lighthouses in Hong Kong
