= Motivator =

Motivator is a source of motivation. It may also refer to:

- "Motivator", a 1989 song by Spandau Ballet from the album Heart Like a Sky
- Motivator (horse), winner of the 2005 Epsom Derby
- Motivator-Hygiene theory, combination of factors for workplace satisfaction
- MOS Motivator, a container ship
- Mr Motivator, the persona of fitness trainer Derrick Errol Evans

== See also ==
- MotivAider, an electronic behavior change device
