= Beaufort Island (Hong Kong) =

Island in Hong Kong

螺洲
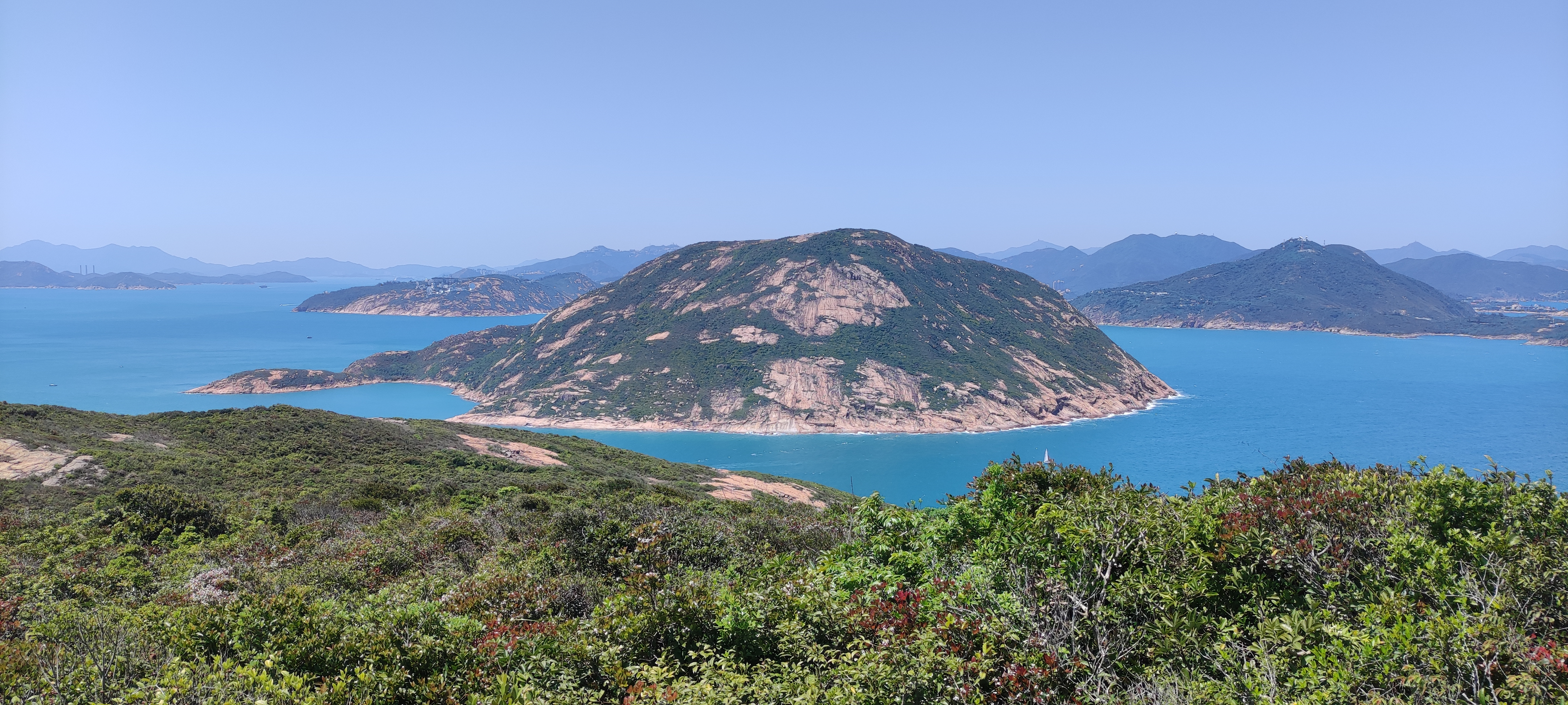
- Beaufort Island and Lo Chau Mun channel

- Location within Hong Kong

Geography
- Location: South China Sea
- Coordinates: 22°11′00″N 114°15′00″E

Administration
- Hong Kong
- District: Islands District

Demographics
- Population: 0

Beaufort Island
- Traditional Chinese: 螺洲
Transcriptions
Standard Mandarin
- Hanyu Pinyin: Hénglándǎo
Yue: Cantonese
- Yale Romanization: Wàahng làahn dóu
- Jyutping: Waang^{4} laan^{4} dou^{2}

Beaufort Island is a member of the Po Toi group of islands in Hong Kong. Its size is about 120 ha (300 acres) while its highest point is 270 m (890 ft) above sea level.

The channel next to Beaufort Island called Lo Chau Mun, or Beaufort Channel, is the deepest part of Hong Kong at 66 m (217 ft) below sea level.

== Ecology ==
According to the local government, several plant species of conservation concern are present on Beaufort Island such as Eulophia flava ( 黃花美冠蘭 ), Podocarpus macrophyllus (羅漢松), Polygala polifolia (小花遠志) and Rungia chinensis (中華孩兒草).

== Geology ==
The 140-million-year-old Po Toi Granite, which forms nearly all of Beaufort Island, is the last large magma intrusion in Hong Kong. Megacrysts are commonly found.

== See also ==
- Waglan Island
- Po Toi Island
