= Wong Tei Tung =

Archaeological site in Hong Kong

Coordinates: 22.4338°N 114.2868°E

Wong Tei Tung (Chinese: 黃地峒) was believed to be an Upper Paleolithic settlement in Hong Kong, but it is now dated 7700 to 2200 years old. It is located near Sham Chung, near to the Three Fathoms Cove on the Sai Kung Peninsula.

The findings were discovered by the Hong Kong Archaeological Society.

== See also ==
- Prehistoric Hong Kong
