= Stone circles (Hong Kong) =

- Traditional Chinese: 分流石圓環
- Simplified Chinese: 分流石圆环
Transcriptions
Standard Mandarin
- Hanyu Pinyin: Fēnliú Shí Yuánhuán
Yue: Cantonese
- Yale Romanization: Fān làuh sehk yùhn wàahn
- Jyutping: Fan1 lau4 sek6 jyun4 waan4

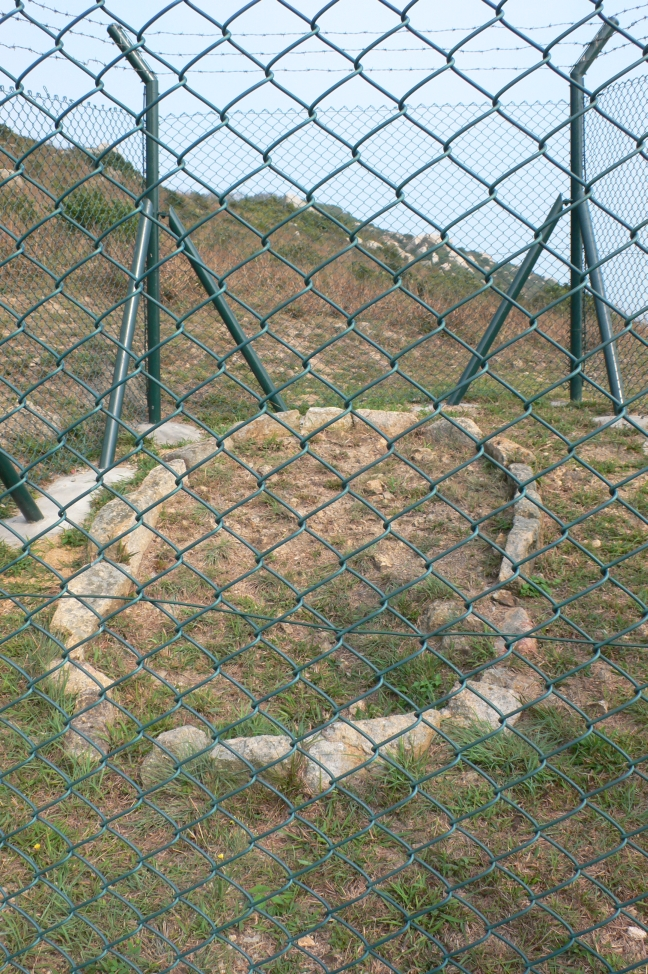
Fau Lau Stone Circle

Stone circles can be found in Hong Kong, as the area is rich in Neolithic and Bronze Age artifacts.

== Lo Ah Tsai Stone Circle ==
Lo Ah Tsai Stone Circle was discovered in the northern part of Lamma Island by K M A Barnett, District Commissioner of the New Territories in 1956. Twenty eight large stones, lying buried in the earth on a slope 100 metres (330 ft) above sea level, form two overlapping stones circles.

This stone circle was investigated by the Hong Kong University Archaeological Team in 1959, 1963 and 1982 respectively.

== Fan Lau Stone Circle ==
The Fan Lau Stone Circle (分流石圓環) was discovered at Fan Lau, on Lantau Island in 1980. (22.197733°N 113.848014°E) It lies 40 metres (130 ft) above sea level. This stone circle is a Declared monument in Hong Kong. The use of the stone circle is unknown, it was possibly used for rituals, or possibly not. It is assumed that it is a megalithic structure created during the late Neolithic (i.e. New Stone Age) and early Bronze Age.

== Taipo Kau Stone Circle ==
In 1953, a stone circle was discovered in Tai Po Kau during the construction of a house. According to a research paper by David Devenish, the stone circle is about 9 feet in diameter, consisting of 9 or 10 stones which had been buried under a mound.

== See also ==
- Prehistoric Hong Kong
