= Sha Po =

Village in Hong Kong

Coordinates: 22.224338°N 114.112171°E

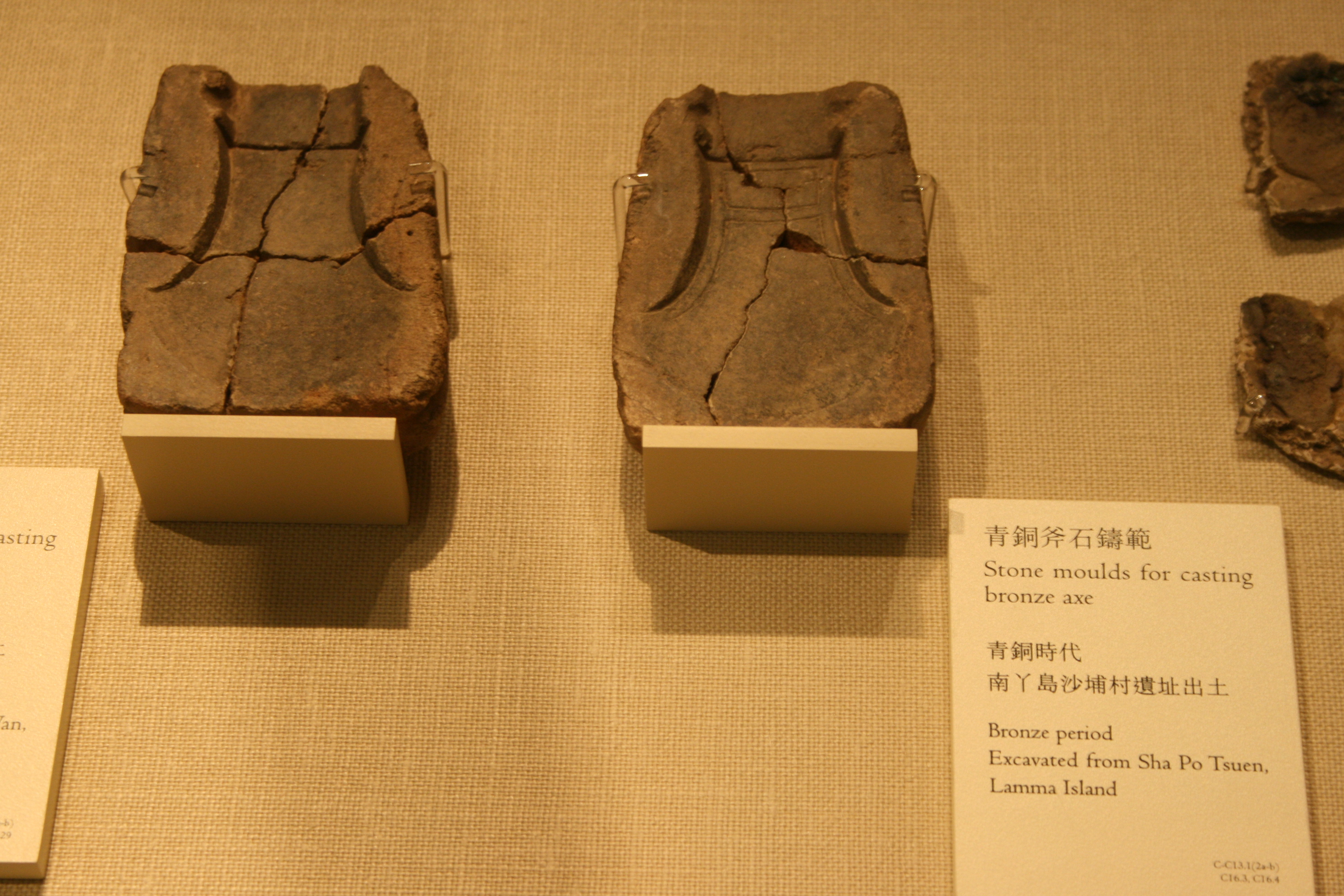
Stone moulds for casting bronze axe, from the Bronze Age. Excavated at Sha Po and exhibited at the Hong Kong Museum of History.

Sha Po (Chinese: 沙埔) is a village located in the area of Yung Shue Wan on the North side of Lamma Island, the third largest island in the territory of Hong Kong.

It comprises Sha Po Old Village (沙埔舊村) and Sha Po New Village (沙埔新村).

== Administration ==
Sha Po is a recognized village under the New Territories Small House Policy.

== Archaeological interest ==
Sha Po Old Village is a place of archaeological interest. A complete hard geometric pot was unearthed in Sha Po Old Village by the Hong Kong Archaeological Society in 1970. In 1988, Bronze Age hard geometric was found by the same party in basel layers near water table, underlying 2m of kiln debris and clean sand.

== Education ==
All of Lamma Island is in Primary One Admission (POA) School Net 96. Within the school net is one aided school (operated independently but funded with government money): Northern Lamma School (南丫北段公立小學). No government schools are in the net.
