= Po Toi Islands =

Island group in Hong Kong

蒲台羣島
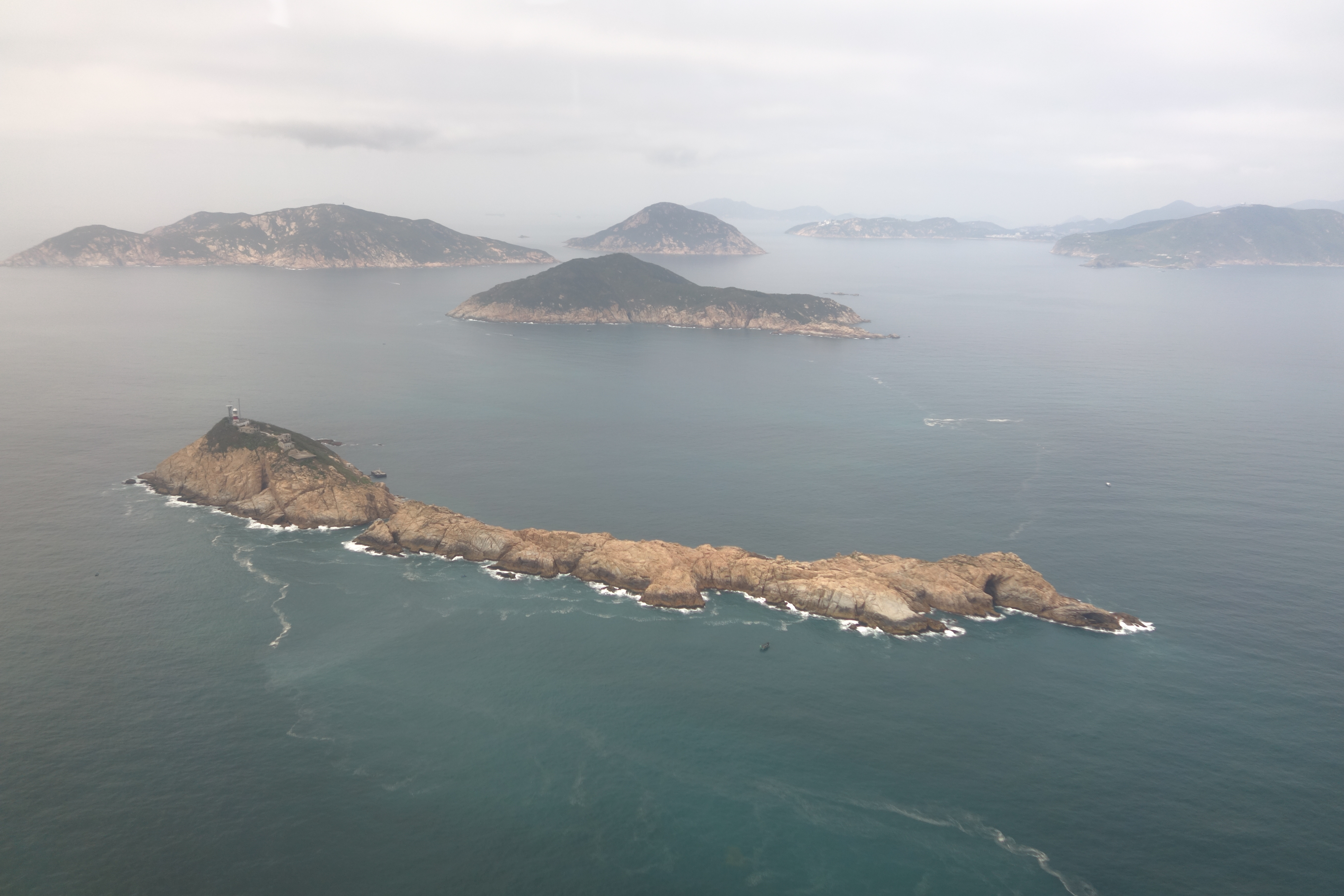
- Aerial view of Waglan Island (foreground), Po Toi (left), Lo Chau and Sung Kong from the east

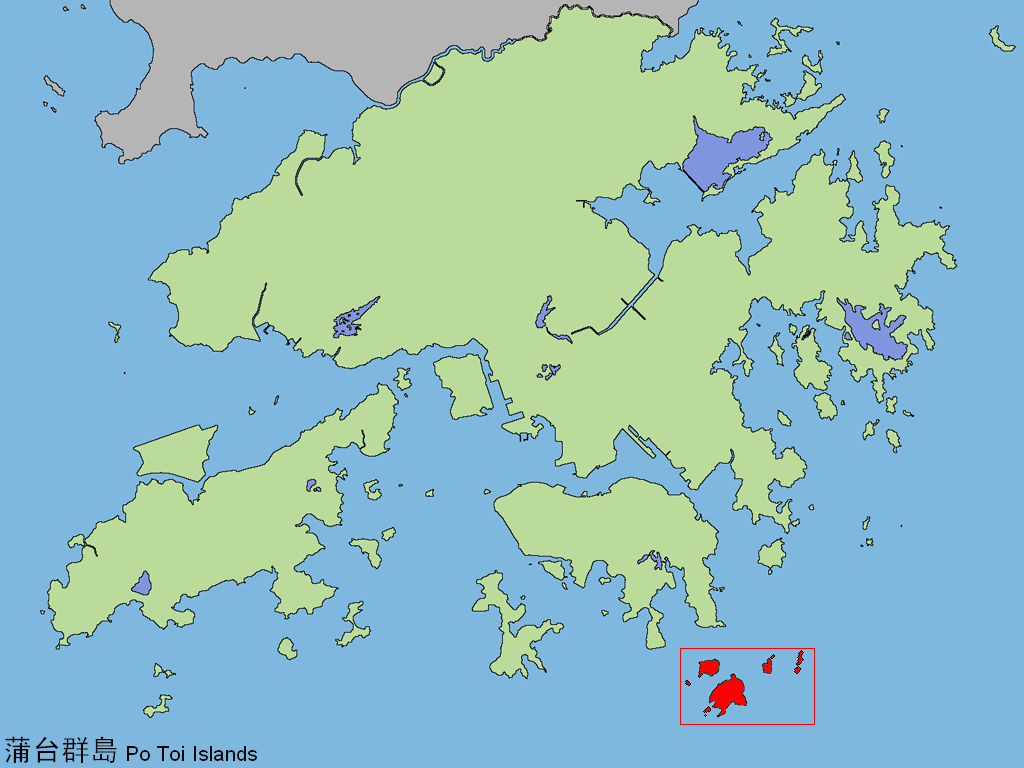
- Location of Po Toi Islands within Hong Kong.

Geography
- Location: South-east of Hong Kong Island
- Coordinates: 22.1742°N 114.2705°E
- Major islands: Po Toi Island

Administration
- Hong Kong
- District: Islands District

Demographics
- Population: 200

Po Toi Islands
- Traditional Chinese: 蒲台羣島/ 蒲苔羣島
- Simplified Chinese: 蒲台群岛/ 蒲苔群岛
Transcriptions
Standard Mandarin
- Hanyu Pinyin: Pútái Qúndǎo
Yue: Cantonese
- Yale Romanization: Pòuh tòih kwàhn dóu
- Jyutping: Pou^{4} toi^{4} kwan^{4} dou^{2}

The Po Toi Islands are a small group of islands with a population of around 200, south-east of Hong Kong Island, off Stanley, in Hong Kong. The main island of the group is Po Toi Island. Administratively, they are part of Islands District.

The islands are notable for interesting rock formations and open-air seafood restaurants. Po Toi Island has a "haunted house", and some rock carvings supposed to be the epitaph of an emperor who died on or near Po Toi. Waglan Island has one of the five surviving pre-war lighthouses in Hong Kong.

== Geography ==
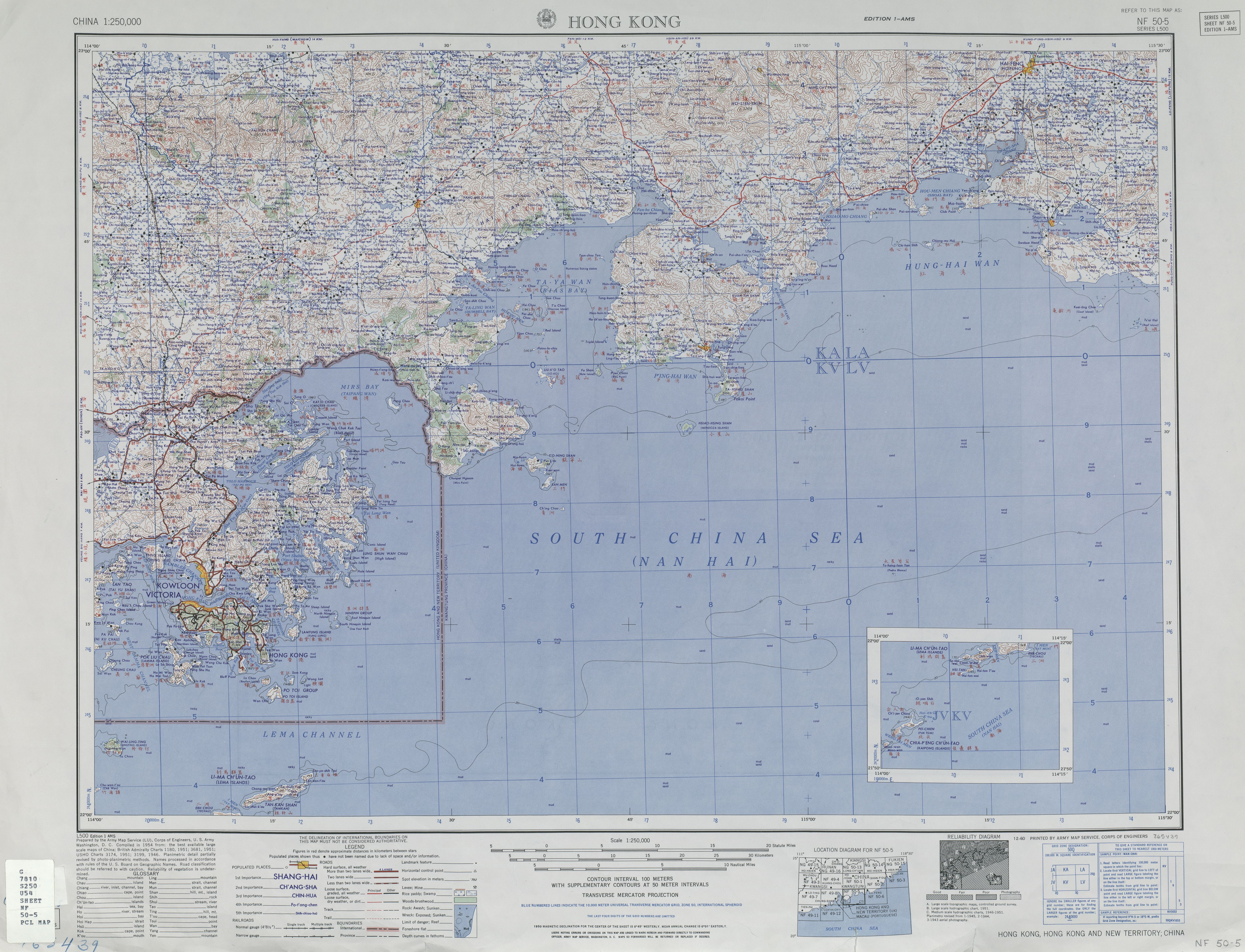
Map including the Po Toi Group (AMS, 1954)

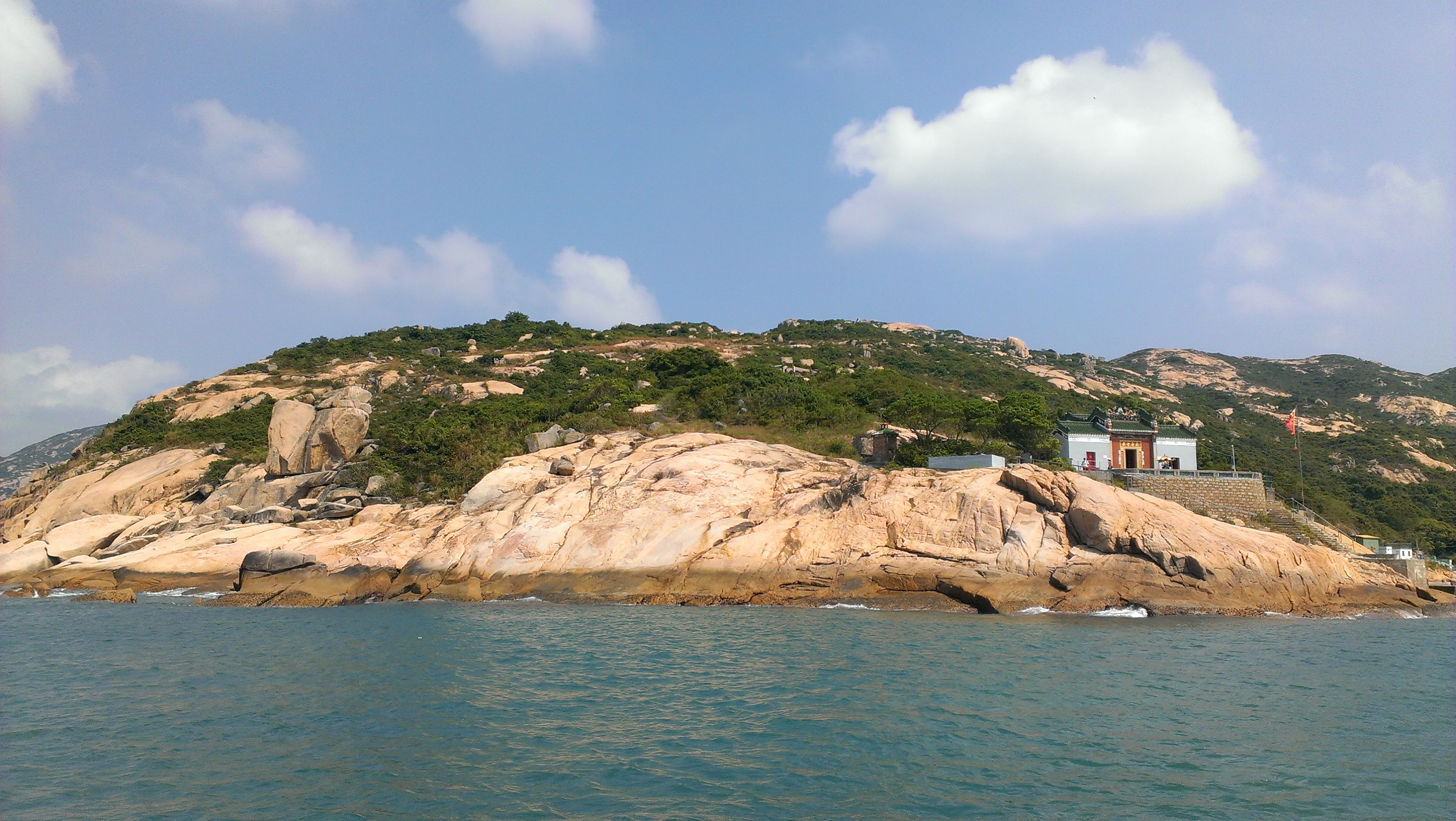
Tin Hau Temple at Tai Wan (大灣) Bay, Po Toi

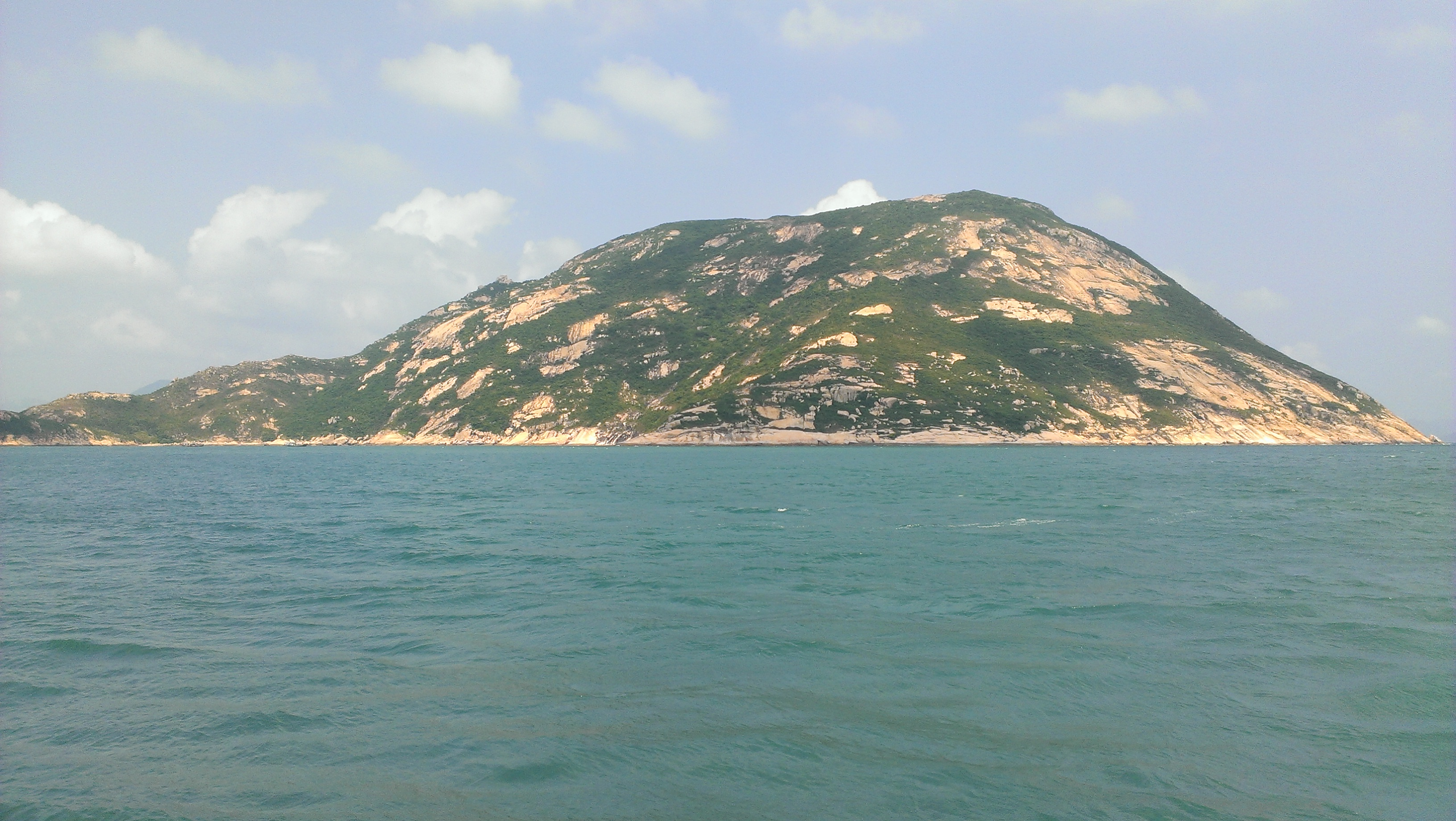
The southwest-facing slope of Beaufort Island (Lo Chau)

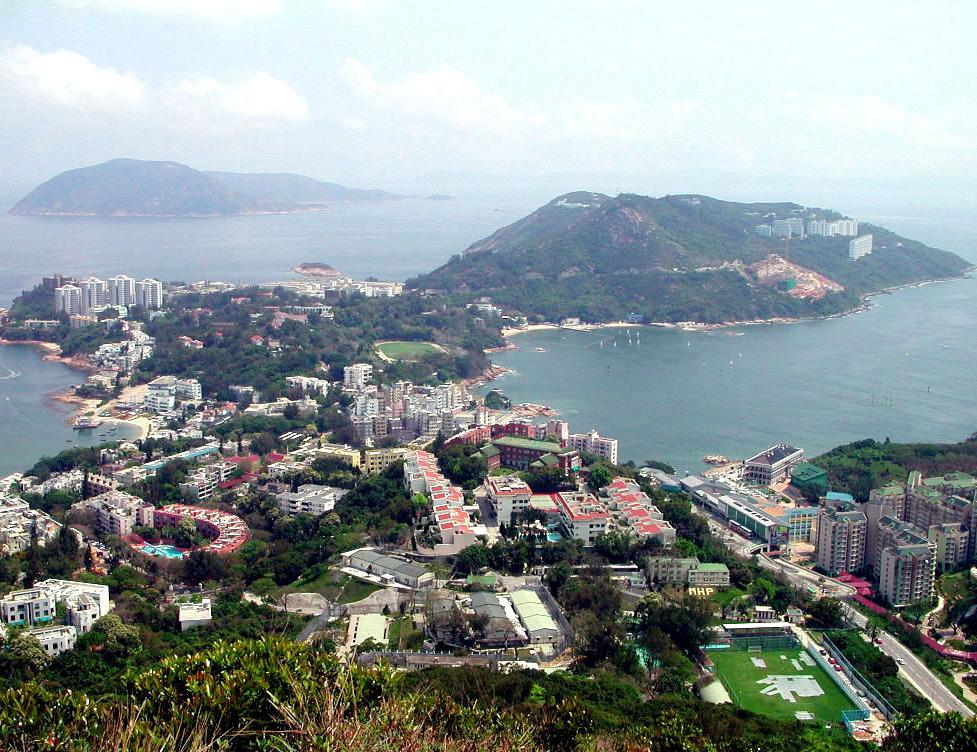
View of Stanley Peninsula in the southeast of Hong Kong Island. On the left, Beaufort Island and Po Toi Island (behind Beaufort), are visible.

Po Toi Islands include:

- Lo Chau Pak Pai (螺洲白排)
- Beaufort Island (螺洲)
- Mat Chau (墨洲), an islet off Po Toi island
- Mat Chau Pai (墨洲排), an islet off Mat Chau
- Po Toi (蒲台), 3.69 km^{2}
- Sai Pai (細排)
- San Pai (散排)
- Sung Kong (宋崗)
- Tai Pai (大排)
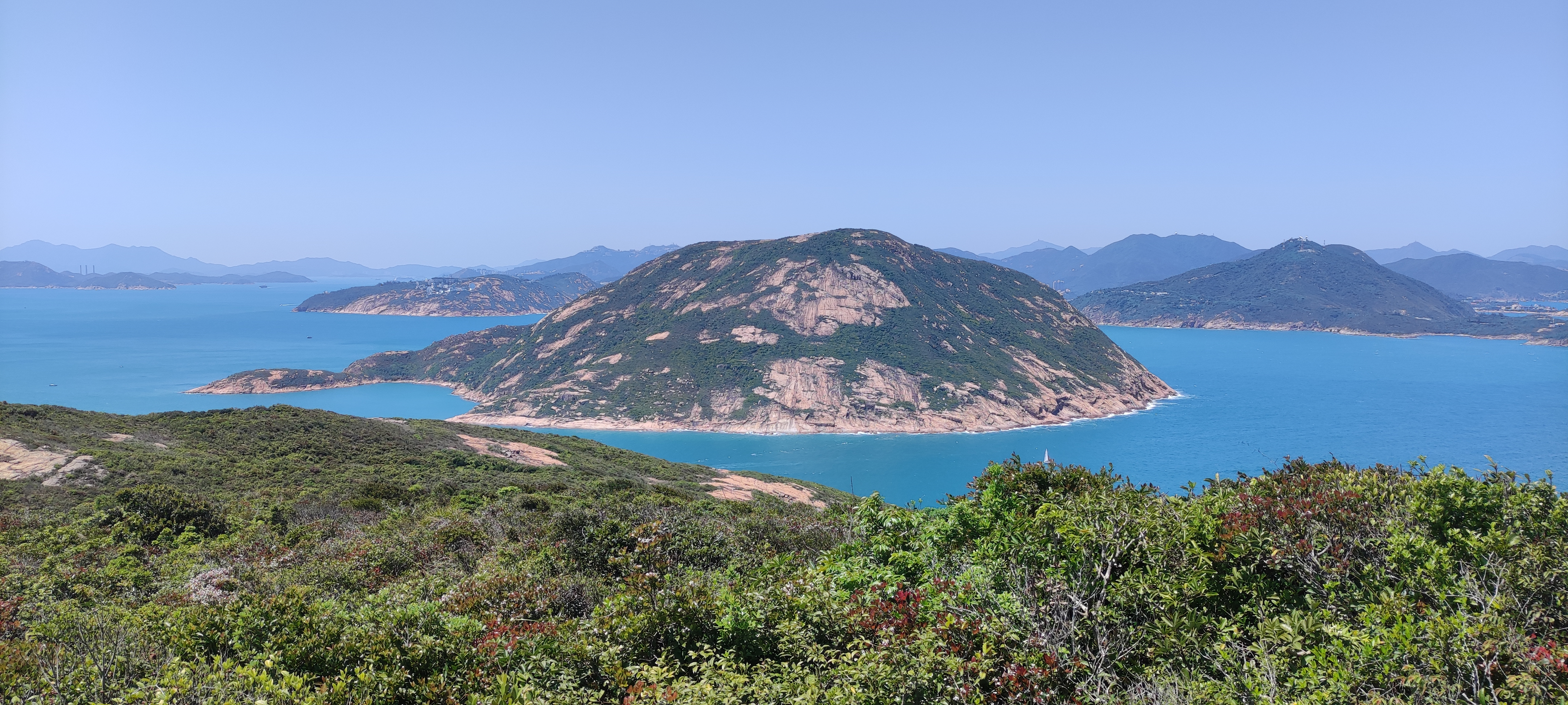
- Beaufort Island & Lo Chau Mun (Deepest part of Hong Kong)
  Waglan Island (橫瀾島)

== Name ==
For the origin of the name, see Po Toi.

== Transport ==
The islands are accessible by private ferry (kai-to) or water taxi. Scheduled ferries connect Po Toi island with Aberdeen and Stanley.

== See also ==
- List of islands and peninsulas of Hong Kong
- List of places in Hong Kong
