= Lantau Channel =

Coordinates: 22°11′3″N 113°49′46″E

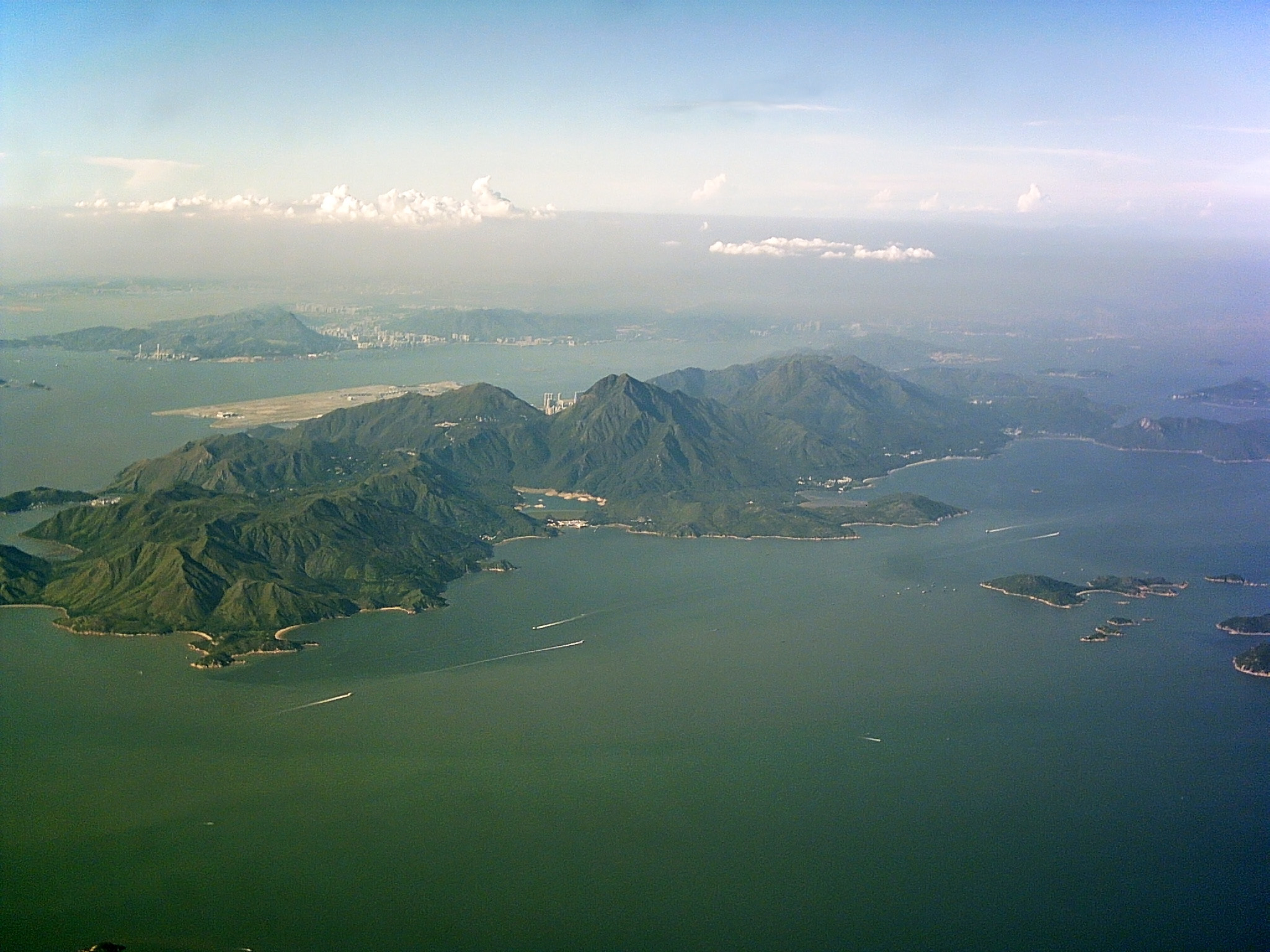
Aerial view of Lantau Island. Lantau Channel is located at the bottom left corner of the photograph.

Lantau Channel (Chinese: 大嶼海峽) is a channel south of Fan Lau Kok of Lantau Island in Hong Kong. The channel is also on the water boundary between Hong Kong and mainland China. Across the border is the islands of Guishan Dao (桂山島), Niutou Dao (牛頭島) and Zhongxin Dao (中心島) of Wanshan Archipelago.

The channel is on the strategic sea route and defense structures like Fan Lau Fort was built to defend the territories.
