= Cape Collinson =

Cape in Hong Kong

Coordinates: 22°15′3.78″N 114°15′13.91″E

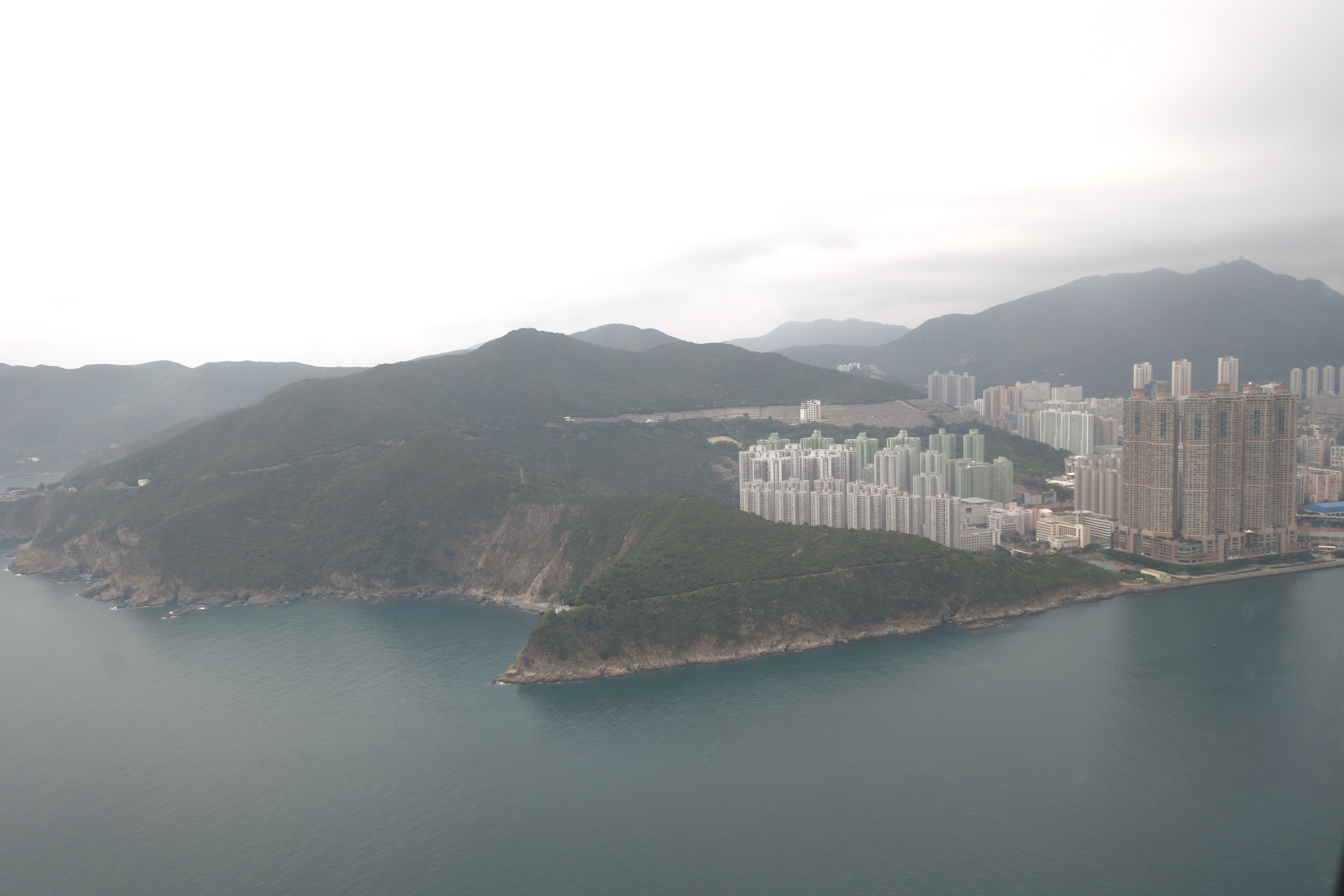
- Aerial view of Cape Collinson and Siu Sai Wan along Tathong Channel
- Traditional Chinese: 歌連臣角
- Simplified Chinese: 歌连臣角
Transcriptions
Standard Mandarin
- Hanyu Pinyin: Gēliánchén Jiǎo
Yue: Cantonese
- Jyutping: go1 lin4 san4 gok3

Hak Kok Tau
- Traditional Chinese: 黑角頭
- Simplified Chinese: 黑角头
Transcriptions
Standard Mandarin
- Hanyu Pinyin: Hēijiǎotóu
Yue: Cantonese
- Jyutping: hak1 gok3 tau4

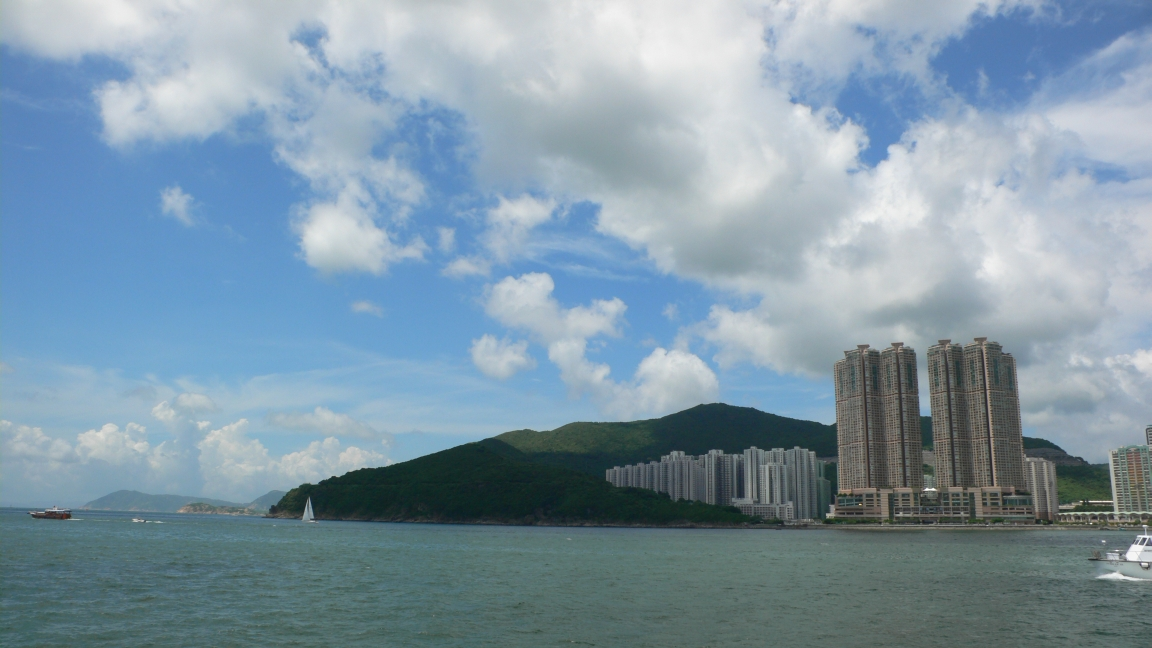
View of Cape Collinson and Siu Sai Wan facing the waters of Tathong Channel.

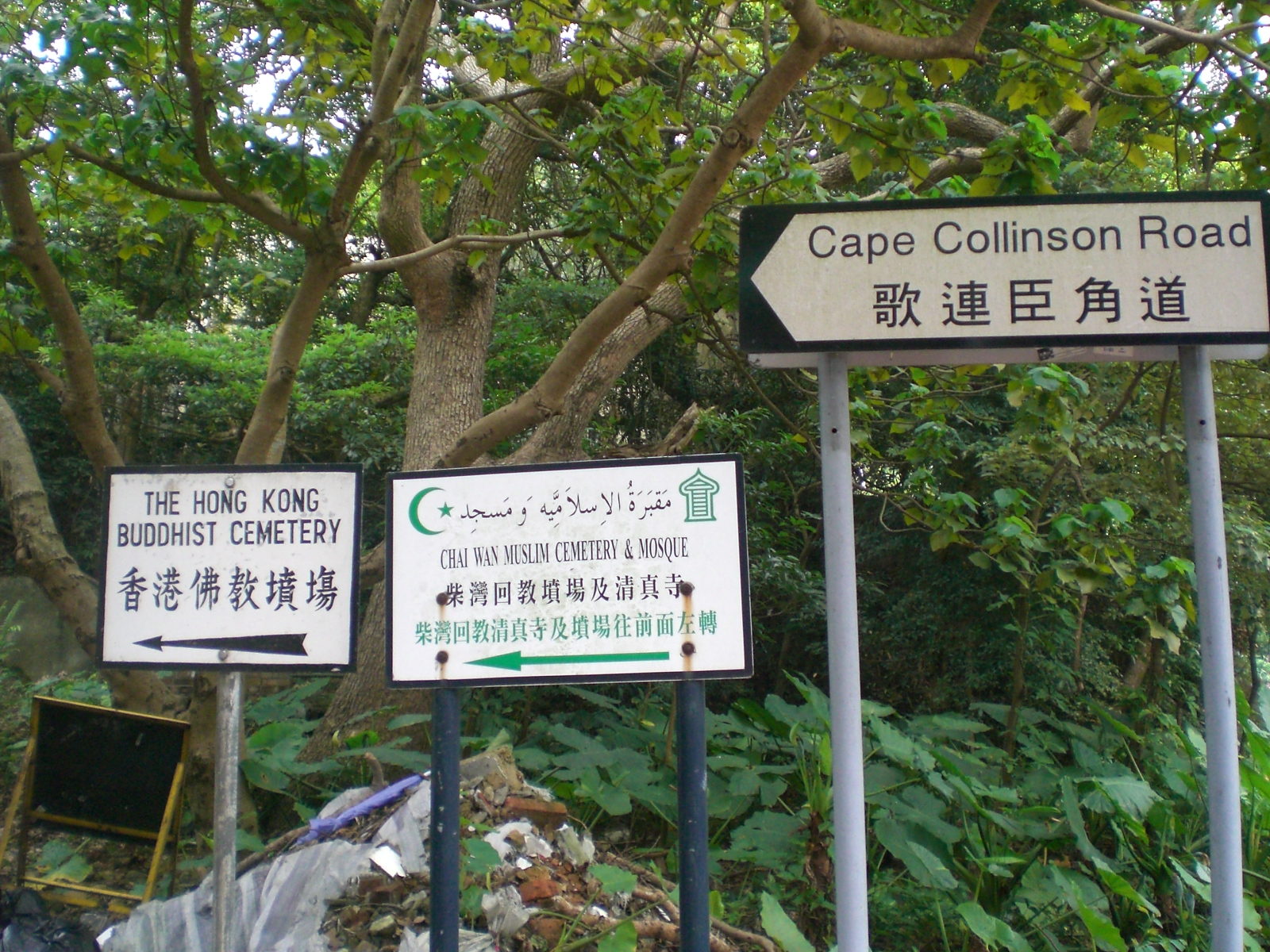
Signs on Cape Collinson Road leading to cemeteries in the area.

Cape Collinson (Chinese: 歌連臣角), also Hak Kok Tau (黑角頭), is a cape located near Ngan Wan between Siu Sai Wan and Big Wave Bay at the eastmost point of Hong Kong Island. It faces Tathong Channel.

== Name ==
The cape is named for Major-General Thomas Bernard Collinson (1821-1902), a Royal Engineers surveyor serving in Hong Kong and later in New Zealand who, then holding the rank of lieutenant, surveyed Hong Kong Island from 1843 to 1846.

== Features ==
Cape Collinson Road runs from Chai Wan up the slope of Pottinger Peak to the east coast until it reaches south of the Cape Collinson Correctional Institution in Tso Tui Wan. Right before reaching the east coast, the road intersects with the connection point of a hiking route running south from Siu Sai Wan Promenade (via Leaping Dragon Walk) to Shek O Country Park and Big Wave Bay (via Pottinger Peak Country Trail). Siu Sai Wan Promenade connects with Cape Collinson Path, another hiking path which runs east near the cape where a lighthouse is erected.

An ancient rock carving was discovered at Cape Collinson in October 2018. It is located on a cliff, about 11 m above sea level. It is a declared monument of Hong Kong.

=== Cemeteries ===
There are several cemeteries and columbaria adjacent to Cape Collinson Road, near Chai Wan under the western slope of Pottinger Peak, some distance from Cape Collinson itself. Cemeteries at Mount Collinson include:

- Cape Collinson Chinese Permanent Cemetery. Opened in 1963
- Cape Collinson Muslim Cemetery a.k.a. Chai Wan Muslim Cemetery. Opened in 1963
- Holy Cross Roman Catholic Cemetery. Opened in 1960
- Sai Wan War Cemetery (where the dead from the Second World War are buried). Opened in 1946

The Cape Collinson Crematorium is also located in the area.

== Transport ==
The cape is accessible within walking distance east from the Mass Transit Railway's Chai Wan station.
