= Fan Lau Fort =

Coordinates: 22.198464°N 113.851093°E

- 分流炮台 (Chinese)
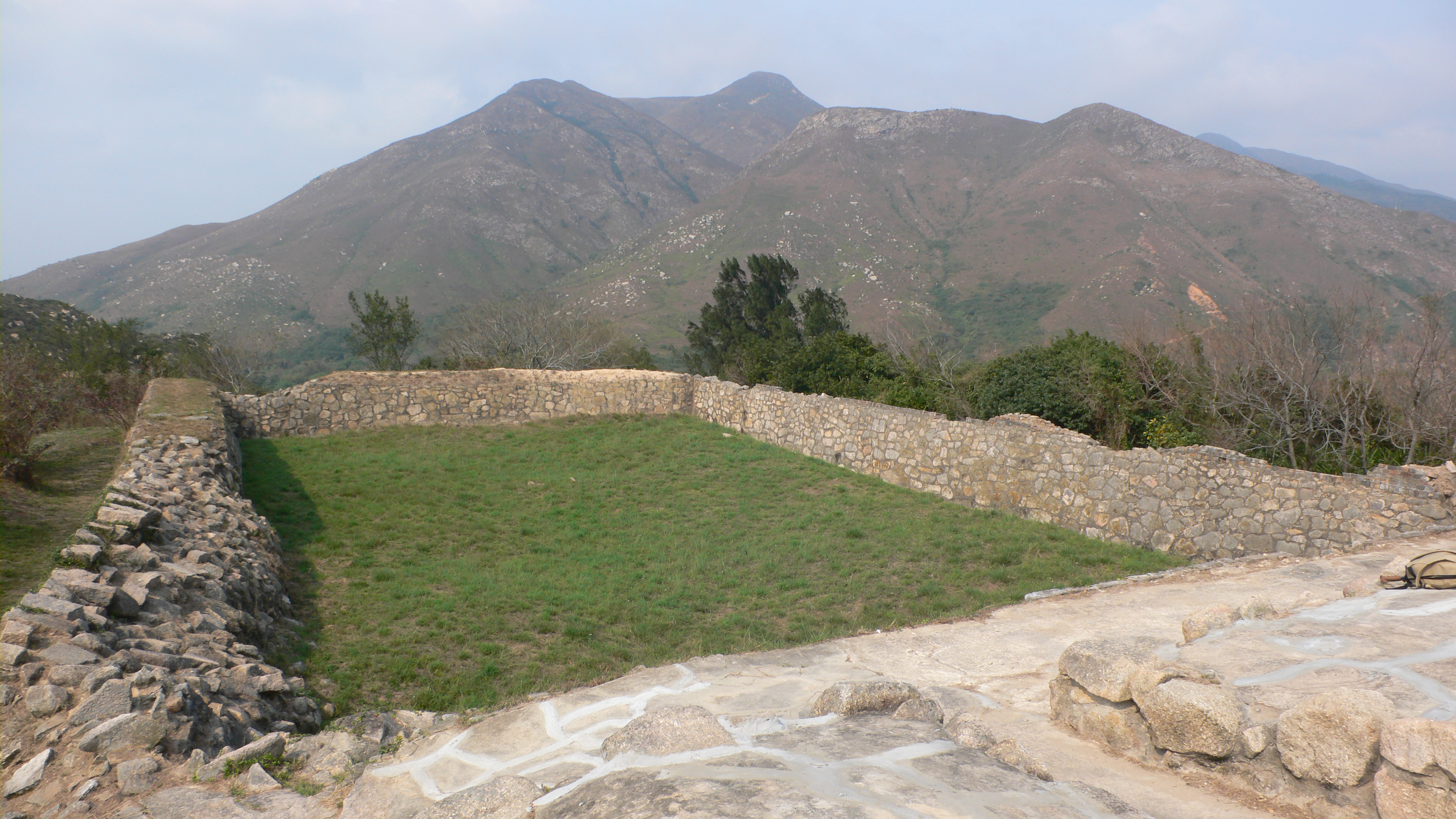
- Fan Lau Fort
- Interactive map of Fan Lau Fort
- Location: Fan Lau, Lantau Island, Hong Kong

History
- Built: 1729

Declared Monument of Hong Kong
- Designated: 13 November 1981
- Reference no.: 11

Fan Lau Fort
- Traditional Chinese: 分流炮台
Transcriptions
Yue: Cantonese
- Yale Romanization: Fān làuh paau tòih
- Jyutping: Fan1 lau4 paau3 toi4

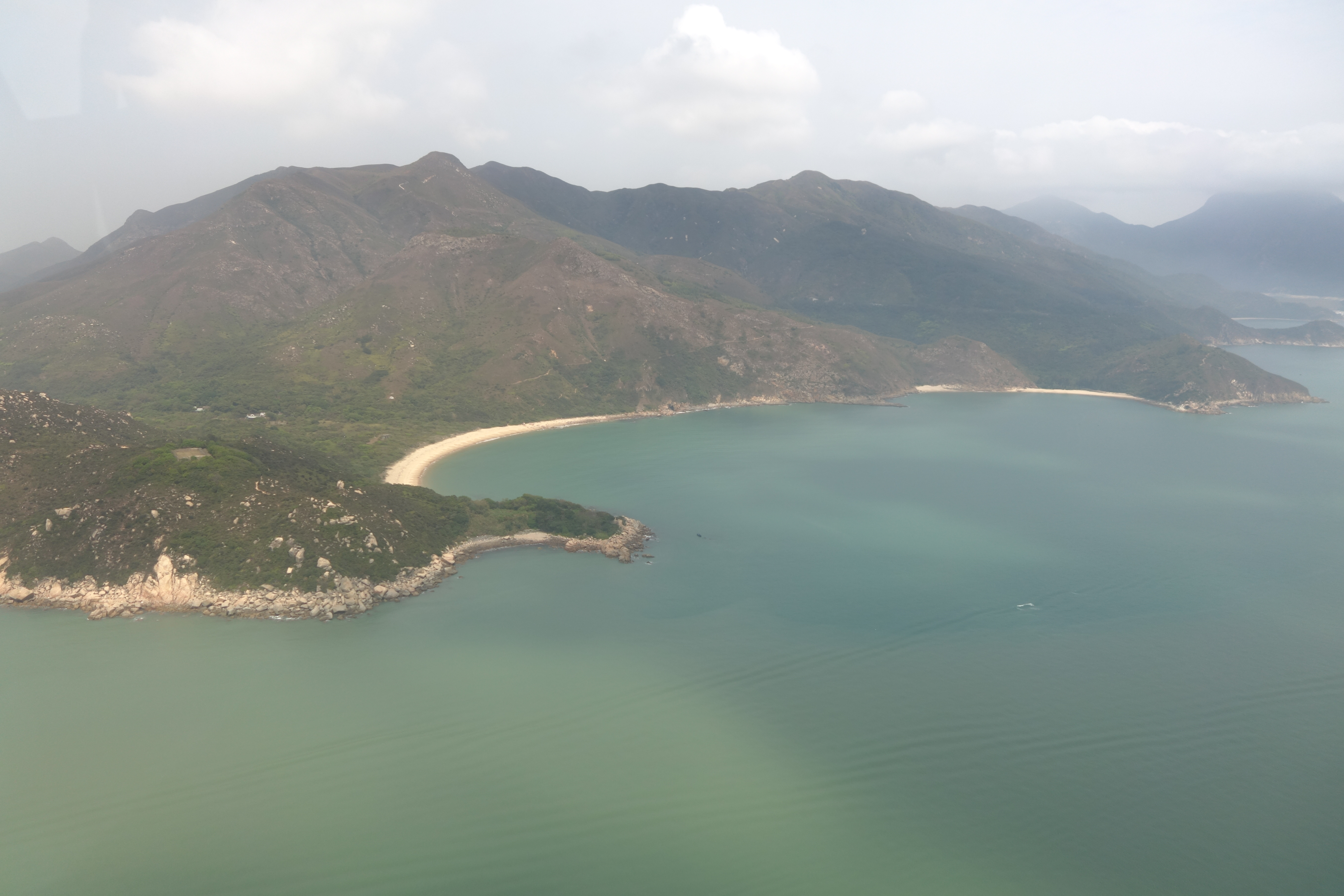
The Fan Lau Fort (bottom left) and its surroundings.

Fan Lau Fort is a former military fortification located on Lantau Island in Hong Kong. Named after the eponymous peninsula it is situated on, it was built in 1729 during the reign of the Yongzheng Emperor, a hundred and twelve years before the British took possession of Hong Kong. Abandoned in 1898, it became a declared monument of Hong Kong in 1981.

== History ==
Construction of the Fan Lau Fort was completed in 1729, and was overseen by Yeung Lin (楊琳), the Governor of Guangdong and Guangxi provinces at the time. Its formation was recorded in the Macau Gazetteer, which recounted how the fort was one of two erected on Lantau Island during the seventh year of the Yongzheng Emperor's reign. During the early part of the Qing dynasty, the fort was known as Tai Yu Shan Fort (大嶼山炮台) – named after the romanized Chinese name of Lantau Island (Tai Yu Shan) – but was renamed to Kai Yik Fort (雞翼炮台) during the middle and later era of the dynasty. The purpose of the fort was to protect the passage between the island and the Pearl River estuary from pirates, who threatened the coasts and seas of southern China. At the time, Imperial China did not have a large navy, and thus, relied on the development of forts as an alternative way to defend its coast.

The site of the fort was chosen because it was located on a cliff that overlooked the water at 116 metres (381 ft) above sea level. This provided excellent views of the sea and a clear vantage point in case of a potential naval attack. However, the newly built fort was primitive and – in the words of local historian Jason Wordie – "quite small and relatively insignificant". It was eventually seized by the pirates it had intended to repel, but the government would have recaptured the fort in 1810, when the pirates surrendered to imperial soldiers. It was refurbished shortly after its reconquest, and was subsequently part of a key enlargement of fortifications around the area during the next decade.

In 1842, a year after the British took possession of Hong Kong Island, officers from the British Army who surveyed the area discovered that the fort was left unguarded. Fifty-six years later, in 1898 – the year the British were granted a lease over the New Territories – Fan Lau Fort was "abandoned altogether". A similar fate would befall other military fortifications that guarded the coastline, such as the ones in Tung Chung and Junk Island.

== Restoration and present-day ==
After the fort was abandoned, it slowly fell into disrepair over the years. Villagers living in Fan Lau took stones from its walls to utilize as raw materials for construction, and the old fortification was surrounded by thick foliage. Fan Lau Fort was declared a monument on November 13, 1981, and preliminary restoration works were carried out during the early part of 1985. A more extensive restoration took place five years later in 1990, and entailed clearing away the foliage encircling the site. In that same year, three blocks of flats were constructed close to the fort in anticipation of CLP Group's proposal to establish a HK$60 billion power station in Fan Lau. However, the Government refused to approve of the project, and the properties were never inhabited and remain deserted.

The ruins of Fan Lau Fort is one of only two historic military fortifications on Lantau Island that have survived to the present day – the other being Tung Chung Fort.

== Description ==
Fan Lau Fort is rectangular with dimensions of 46 metres (151 ft) by 21 metres (69 ft). Its exterior walls – which were made of "semi-dressed stone and green bricks" – are 5 metres (16 ft) tall, and its entrance faces towards the east. When it was first built, the fort was guarded by thirty soldiers and equipped with eight cannons, along with twenty guard houses.

== See also ==
- Tung Chung Fort, another fort on Lantau Island
- List of the oldest buildings and structures in Hong Kong
