= Po Toi =

Island in Hong Kong

Coordinates: 22°10′8.8″N 114°15′48.2″E

蒲台島
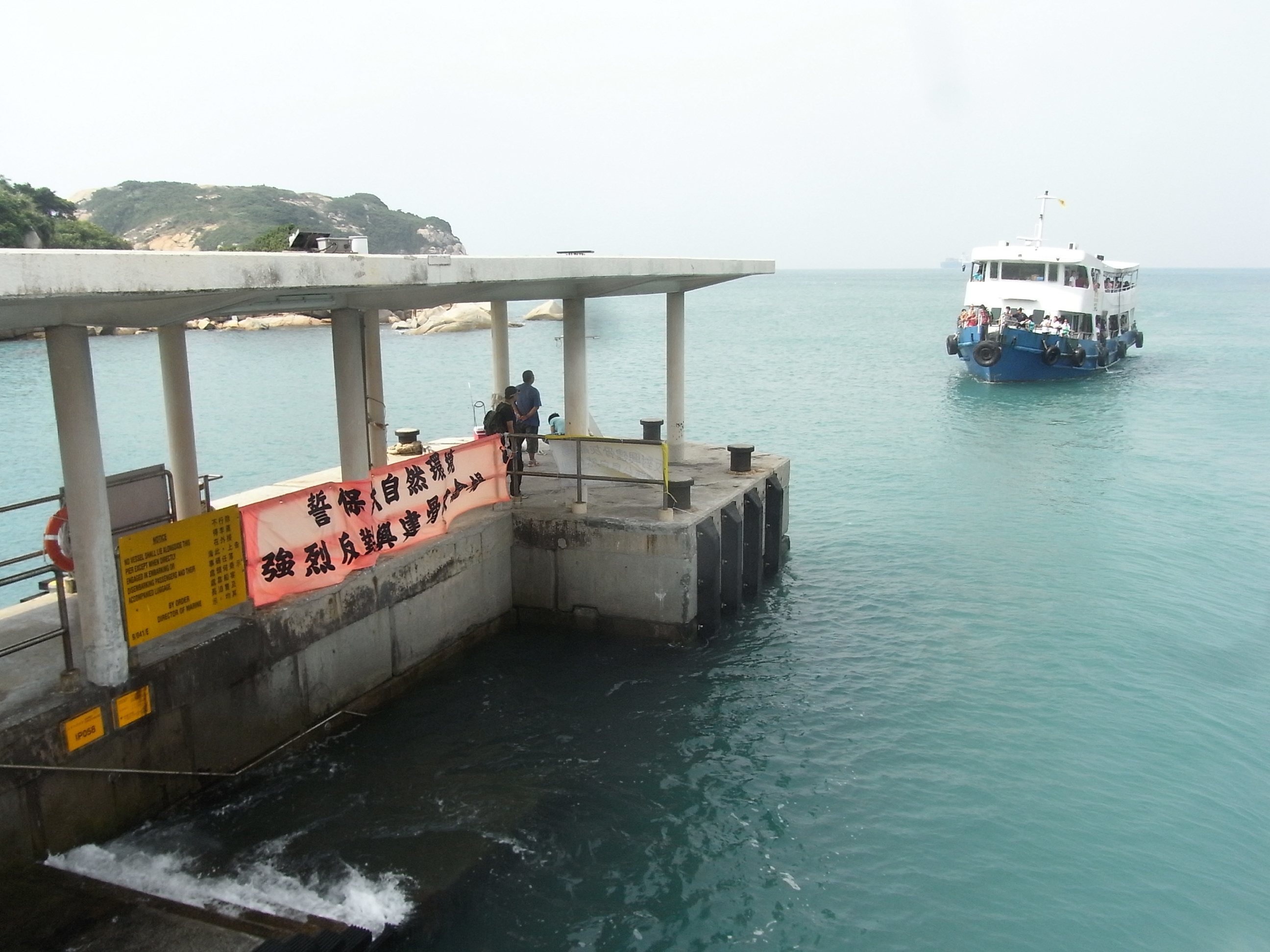
- Tsui Wah Ferry vessel arriving at Po Toi public pier

- Location of Po Toi Island within Hong Kong

Geography
- Area: 3.69 km^{2} (1.42 sq mi)

Administration
- Hong Kong
- District: Islands District

Po Toi
- Traditional Chinese: 蒲台島
- Simplified Chinese: 蒲台岛
Transcriptions
Standard Mandarin
- Hanyu Pinyin: Pútáidǎo
Yue: Cantonese
- Yale Romanization: Pòuh tòih dóu
- Jyutping: Pou^{4} toi^{4} dou^{2}

Alternative Chinese name
- Traditional Chinese: 蒲苔島
- Simplified Chinese: 蒲苔岛
Transcriptions
Standard Mandarin
- Hanyu Pinyin: Pútáidǎo
Yue: Cantonese
- Yale Romanization: Pòuh tòih dóu
- Jyutping: Pou^{4} toi^{4} dou^{2}

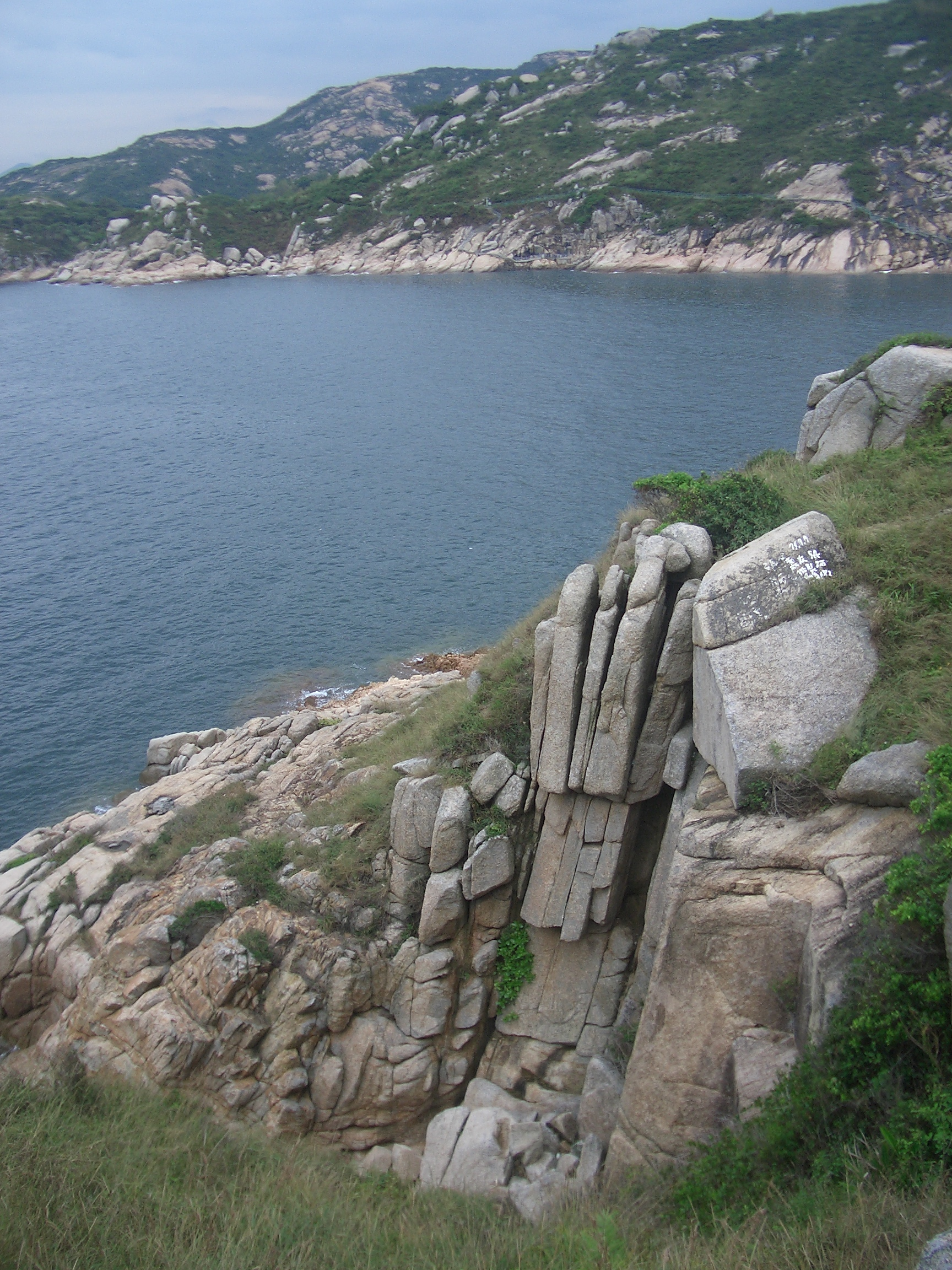
Buddha's Palm Cliff (佛手巖) resembles the shape of a human hand

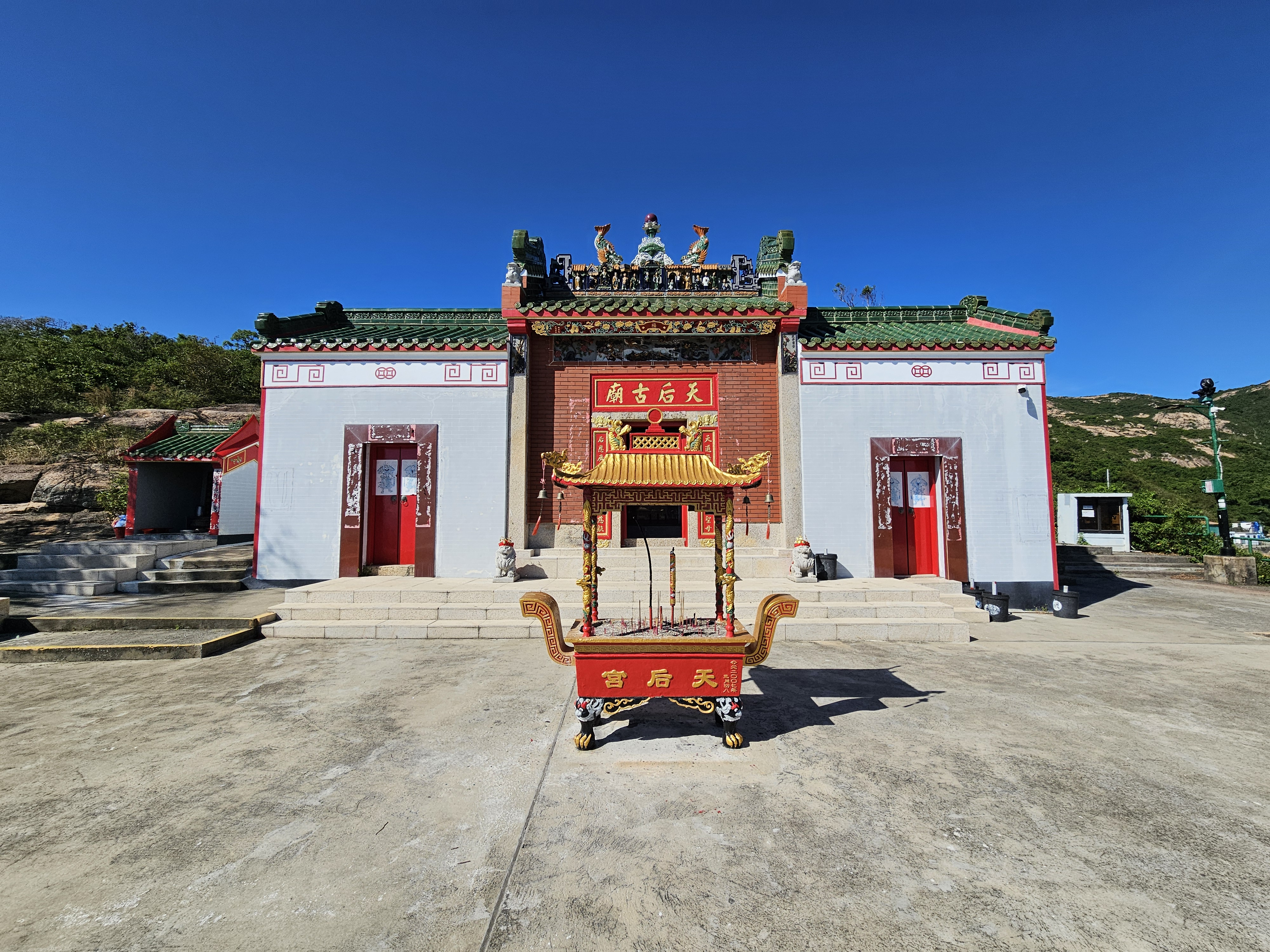
Tin Hau Temple on Po Toi.

Po Toi (commonly Chinese: 蒲台島, originally Chinese: 蒲苔島) is the main island of the Po Toi Islands and the southernmost island of Hong Kong, with an area of 3.69 km^{2}.

== Name ==
It is said that the island used to produce dried seaweeds (苔), which were shaped like the cattail hassock (蒲團) used by the monks for sitting; therefore the island was originally called 蒲苔島, the present common name being a corruption. Another explanation states that Po Toi looks like a floating platform (浮台) when viewed from a distance on sea. 蒲 is another character meaning "to float" in the local dialect, thus giving the island its name.

== Administration ==
Po Toi is a recognized village under the New Territories Small House Policy.

== History ==
The island historically had a maximum of about 1,000 fishermen and farmers, whose economic activity consisted mainly of fishing, farming and seaweed harvesting. The population lived mainly in two villages, Chang Shek Pai (長石排) and Shan Liu (山寮). The population decreased sharply over the past decades, with the younger generations moving to the city.

== Features ==
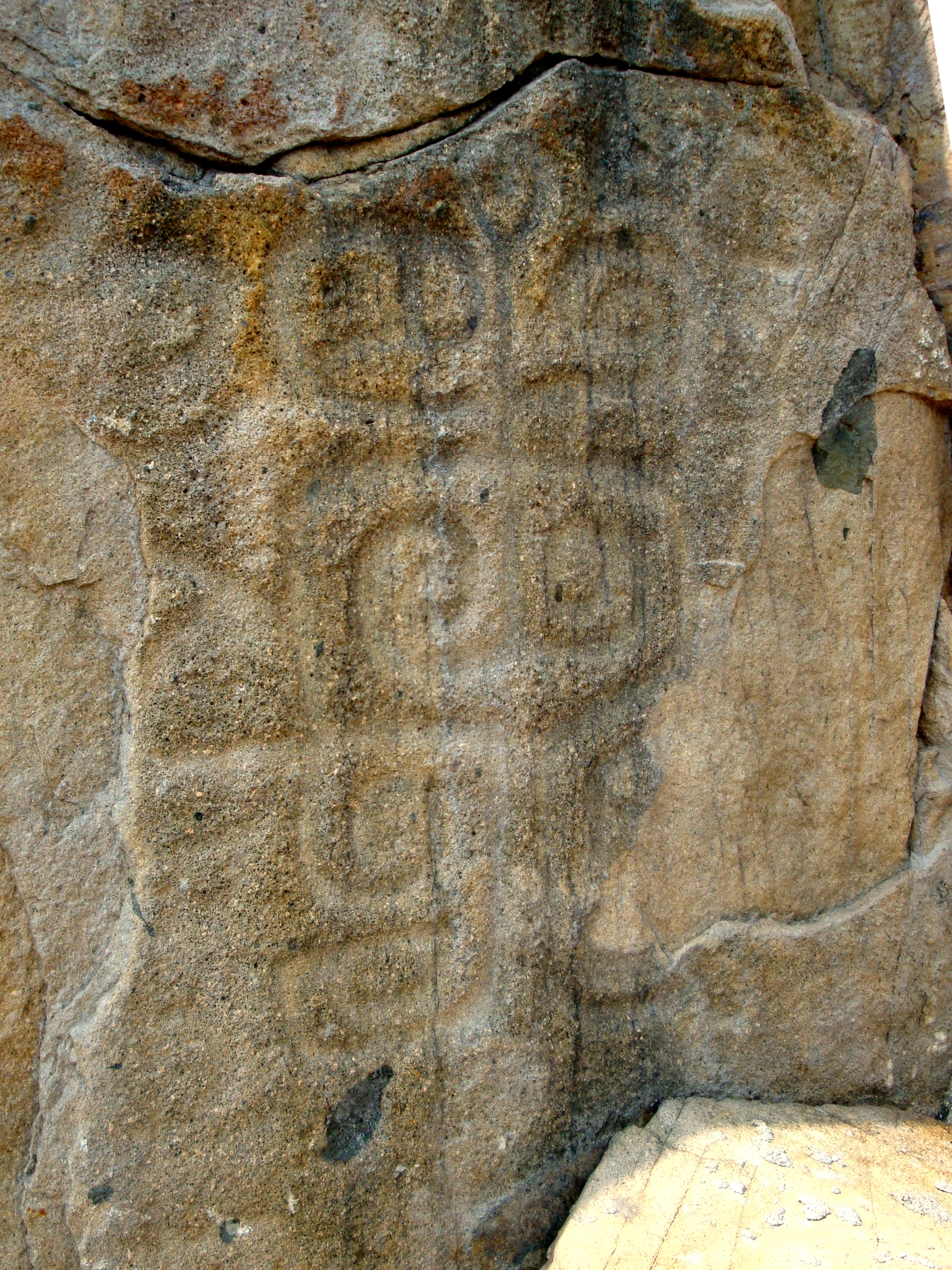
Bronze age rock carvings

Po Toi is an important birding hotspot in Hong Kong, with over 350 species recorded. However the numbers are declining like elsewhere in Hong Kong, the rather degraded environmental situation around the village being one of the factors.

Po Toi is famous for its rock formations, such as the Buddha's Palm Cliff (佛手巖), the Coffin Rock (棺材石), the Tortoise Rock (靈龜上山) and the Monk Rock (僧人石).

Ancient rock carvings on the island, believed to date back to the Bronze Age (around 1500–700 BC), were discovered in the 1960s. They have been listed as declared monuments of Hong Kong since 1979. These may be viewed on a spur-track on the track that runs between the main harbour (Tai Wan), and the lighthouse.

A Tin Hau Temple is located on Po Toi, facing the bay of Tai Wan (大灣). While its construction date is unknown, it is documented that the temple was renovated in 1893.

Mo's Old House, or the "Deserted Mansion of Family Mo" (巫氏廢宅), usually referred to as the "Haunted House", is a popular venue of "adventure" for the young visitors. The existing house was built in the 1930s at Chang Shek Pai and has fallen into ruins.

There is a lighthouse on Po Toi also known as Nam Kok Tsui Lighthouse.

== Education ==
Po Toi Island is in Primary One Admission (POA) School Net 96, which contains a single aided school, Northern Lamma School on Lamma Island; no government primary schools are in this net.

== Culture ==
Festivals in Po Toi centre around the local Tin Hau Temple. During festivities, a temporary bamboo and sheet metal structure is erected near the temple to host Cantonese Opera performances.

On the 23rd day of the third lunar month, the local temple observes the annual Tin Hau Festival.

Every three years, between the 15th and 19th days of the first lunar month, Po Toi Island hosts a Jiao festival.

== Transport ==
The island is accessible by kai-to or water taxi. Tsui Wah Ferry provides scheduled ferry services connecting Po Toi Island with Aberdeen and Stanley.

== In fiction ==
The climax of John le Carré's novel The Honourable Schoolboy (the second in the 'Karla trilogy', featuring George Smiley) takes place on Po Toi.

== See also ==
- 2014 Po Toi Island ship collision
