= 2014 Po Toi Island ship collision =

Maritime incident in Hong Kong

- 2014 Po Toi Island ship collision (Hong Kong)
- Date: 5 May 2014
- Missing: 11
- Property damage: Cargo ship sunk

On 5 May 2014, the cargo ship Zhong Xing 2 and the container ship MOL Motivator collided off Po Toi Island near Hong Kong, resulting in Zhong Xing 2 sinking. All but one of Zhong Xing 2's twelve-man crew were left missing and presumed dead; a rescue operation was conducted by Chinese authorities, and a fishing vessel rescued one man, Zhong Xing 2's sole survivor.

== Background ==
The accident involved the 300-metre (980 ft), 79,400-ton Mitsui O.S.K. Lines container ship MOL Motivator, registered in the Marshall Islands with a crew of 24, and the 97-metre-long (318 ft) Chinese ship Zhong Xing 2, carrying a cargo of cement with twelve crew. MOL Motivator was travelling from Hong Kong to Yantian, while Zhong Xing 2 was travelling from Hebei to Haikou.

== Accident ==
The collision occurred around 2:30 local time on the morning of 5 May, 3.7 kilometres (2.3 mi) to the southwest of Po Toi Island. Poor visibility has been blamed for the collision, after heavy rain fell through the night, and Hong Kong experienced a "powerful" thunderstorm. Heavy rainfall and lightning may have caused problems with the ships' radars.

== Rescue efforts ==
A fishing vessel passing by rescued a man in his forties from mainland China; 25 minutes later, he was taken to Ruttonjee Hospital, Wan Chai, where he was treated for minor scratches.

A rescue attempt spanning naval and aerial searching was launched, co-ordinated by the Guangdong Maritime Rescue Co-ordination Centre. A fixed-wing aeroplane, seven Hong Kong Marine Police vessels, three fireboats, two diving vessels and a helicopter belonging to the Government Flying Service of Hong Kong, more than ten Chinese vessels, and three Chinese helicopters, were sent in search of the missing vessel. The crew of a helicopter observed an oil slick and floating debris, but no survivors. It is considered possible that the ship sank with only one survivor, the other eleven men trapped on board, and they are "feared dead".
