= Hong Kong Archaeological Society =

- Formation: 1967
- Type: Archaeological organisations
- Headquarters: Hong Kong
- Location: Hong Kong
- Members: Undisclosed (1 year; 10 year; Permanent)
- Official language: Chinese, English
- Chairman: Mr Cheung Pak Long
- Former President: Prof. Li Long Lam
- Key people: Mr Wong Wai Biu, Ms Lau Pui Yong, Ms Chris Liang Pui Wah, Mr Alexander Cheung, Dr Au Chi Kin, Ms Jay Chi Yan Mok
- Website: www.hkarch.org

The Hong Kong Archaeological Society (Chinese: 香港考古學會) is a government-funded organisation dedicated to carrying out excavations and preserving archaeological heritage in Hong Kong. The society is affiliated with the Hong Kong Museum of History to establish artifact collections and journal publications.

== History ==
After the discovery of prehistoric sites in Hong Kong during the 1920s, archaeology activities began in the area. Artifact recoveries and research publications appeared by the 1930s. The earliest recorded archaeologists in Hong Kong were John Schofield and Raffaele Maglioni. The unearthed stone tools, potteries, and bronze artifacts led to support of human presence during the late Neolithic period and Bronze Age in the Hong Kong area with artifacts dating back to 3000–1200 BC and 1200–400 BC.

In 1955, an Eastern Han dynasty tomb at Lei Cheng Uk was accidentally discovered. An archaeological team was formed by the University of Hong Kong a year later, with a limited membership to survey the site. By 1960, the team carried out other excavations at Man Kok Tsui, Lantau Island, with artifacts discovered dating back to the Bronze Age.

In 1967, the archaeologist team reformed to the Hong Kong Archaeological Society to anticipate larger participations numbered around 200 members.

== Notable excavations ==
During the 1970s, projects in Sham Wan and Sha Po Old Village of Lamma Island discovered artifacts dating to the Bronze Age and Neolithic eras.

In 1990, the society began a 16 months artifact rescue mission in Chek Lap Kok at the future site of the Hong Kong International Airport.

In 1991, an excavation at Yung Long, west to Tuen Mun, revealed a cultural phase with painted pottery, dated to 4400–3800 BC.

In 1994, a salvage project in Kau Sai Chau revealed a site without pottery dating to approximately 5000 BC.

In 1999, the society discovered numerous artifacts in Chan Ka Yuen in Ha Pak Nai, west to Tuen Mun.

In 2000, Lam Tsuen Valley in Tai Po was investigated by the society.

In 2001, a house structure with underground water system dating to the Song dynasty was discovered in Mong Tseng Wai of Yuen Long. It was the only Song dynasty village site in Hong Kong.

In 2004–05, the society invited Lingnan Archaeology of Sun Yat-sen University to salvage a stone quarry excavation site at Wong Tei Tung, Sai Kung Peninsula. Artifacts discovered were dated back to late Paleolithic era.

In 2007, excavations in Luk Keng Village, Lantau Island, was discovered two furnaces with more than 2,000 items belonging to the Tang, Ming, and Qing dynasties, with some belonging to the Bronze and Neolithic ages as well.

== Publication ==
The society publishes its work in the Journal of Hong Kong Archaeological Society.

== Affiliations ==
The society is supported by membership dues and subsidies from the Antiquities and Monuments Office of the Hong Kong Government. The Hong Kong Museum of History also provides the society with workshop and office spaces, and funds their published journals.

== Board of Directors and Committee Members ==
Board of Directors and Committee Members since August 2022:

- Chairman: Mr Tseung Pak Long.
- Vice-Chairman and Honorary Public Relations Officer: Mr Cheung Yu Ling, Alexander
- Honorary Secretary is Ms Lau Pui Yung,
- Honorary Treasurer: Mr Wong Wai Biu
- Honorary Editor: Dr Au Chi Kin.
- Other Board of Directors are: Mr Cheung Kam Chiu, Mr Ho Chi Kong

Committee Members:

- Mr Wong Kwan Yin,
- Ms Liang Pui Wa, Chris,
- Ms Chan Kwok Ching,
- Mr Lau Kai Hin, and;
- Ms Mok Chi Yan, Jay.
