= Fan Lau =

Area of Lantau Island, Hong Kong

Coordinates: 22.202743°N 113.851483°E

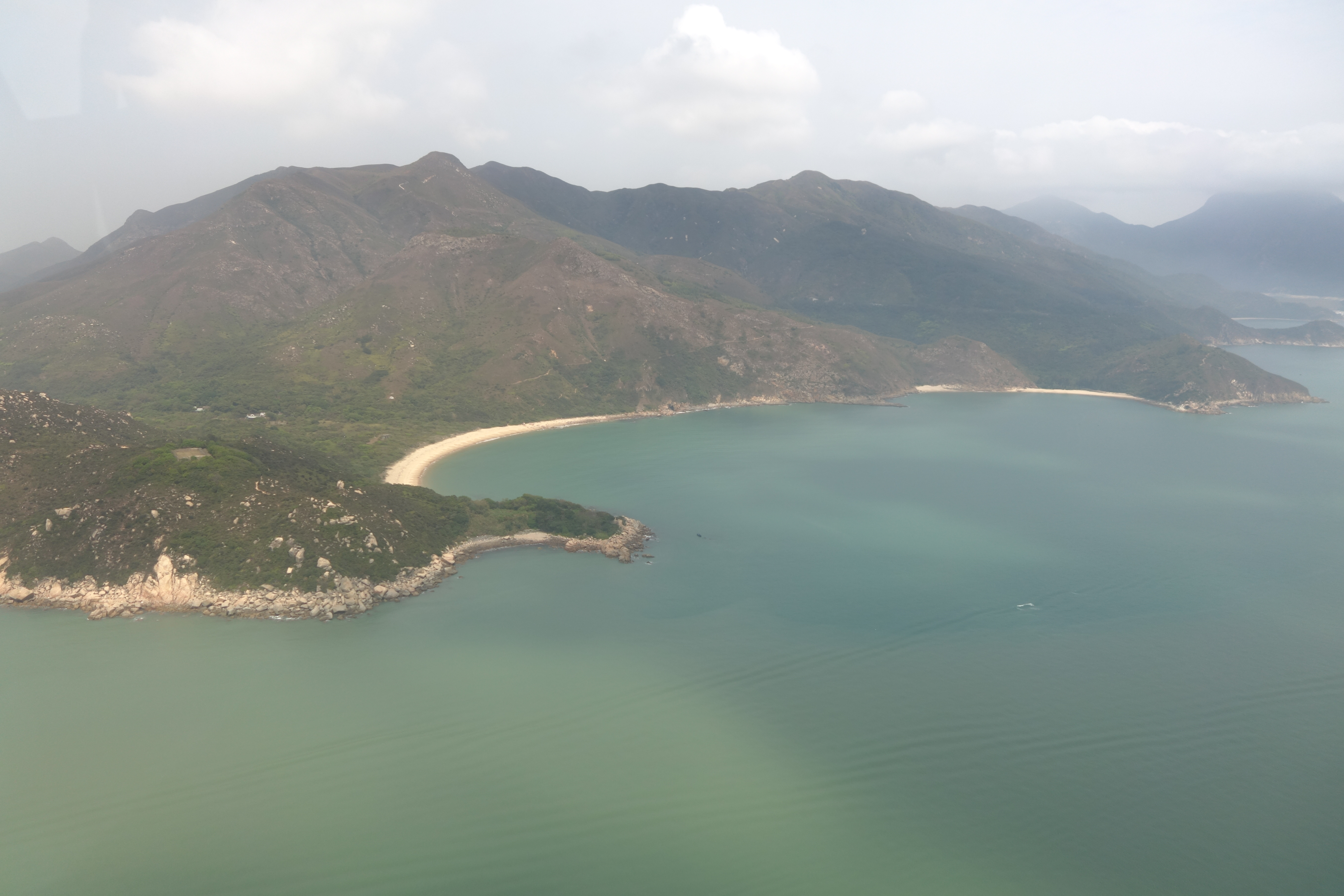
Fan Lau Tung Wan

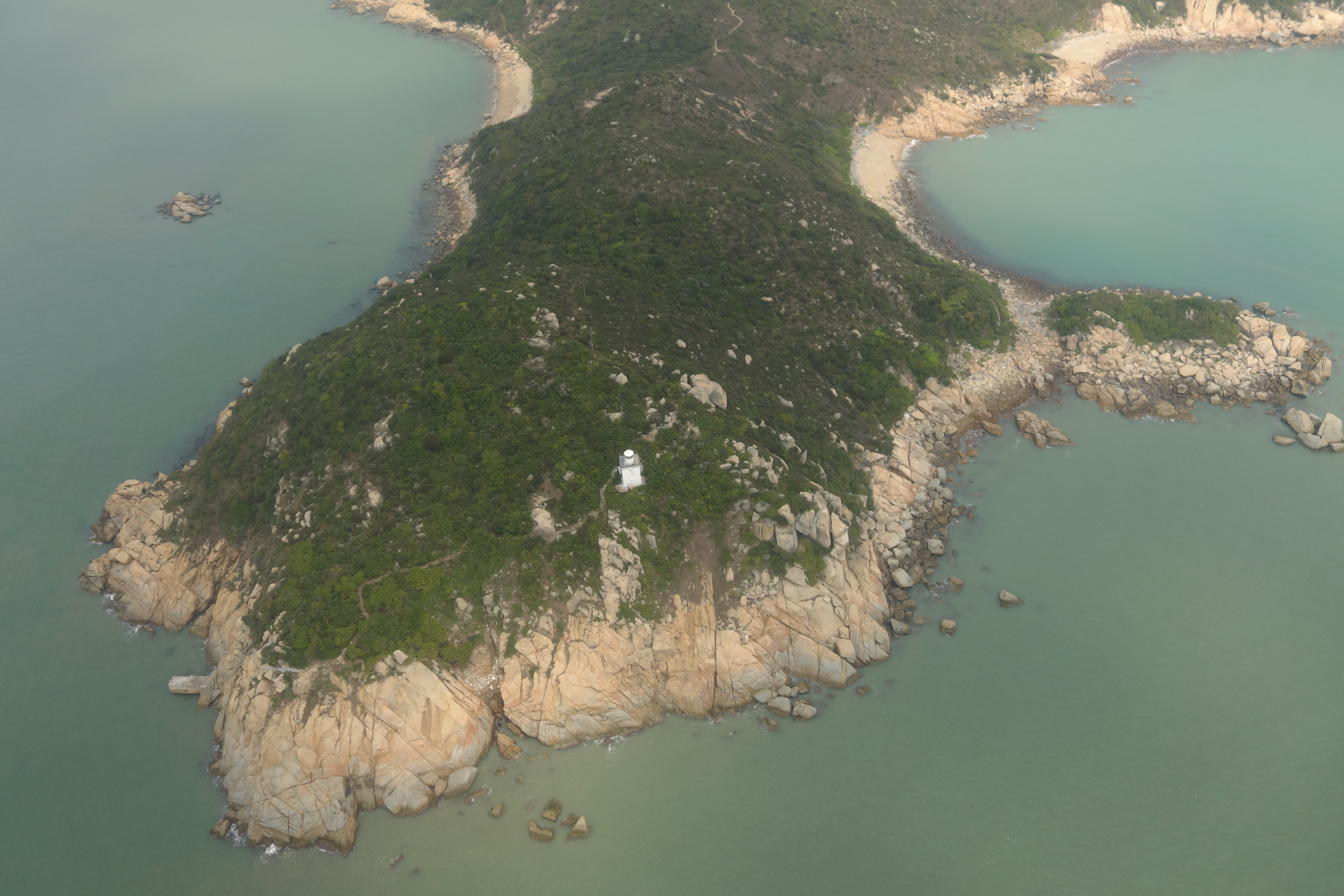
Close-up of Fan Lau Kok and lighthouse

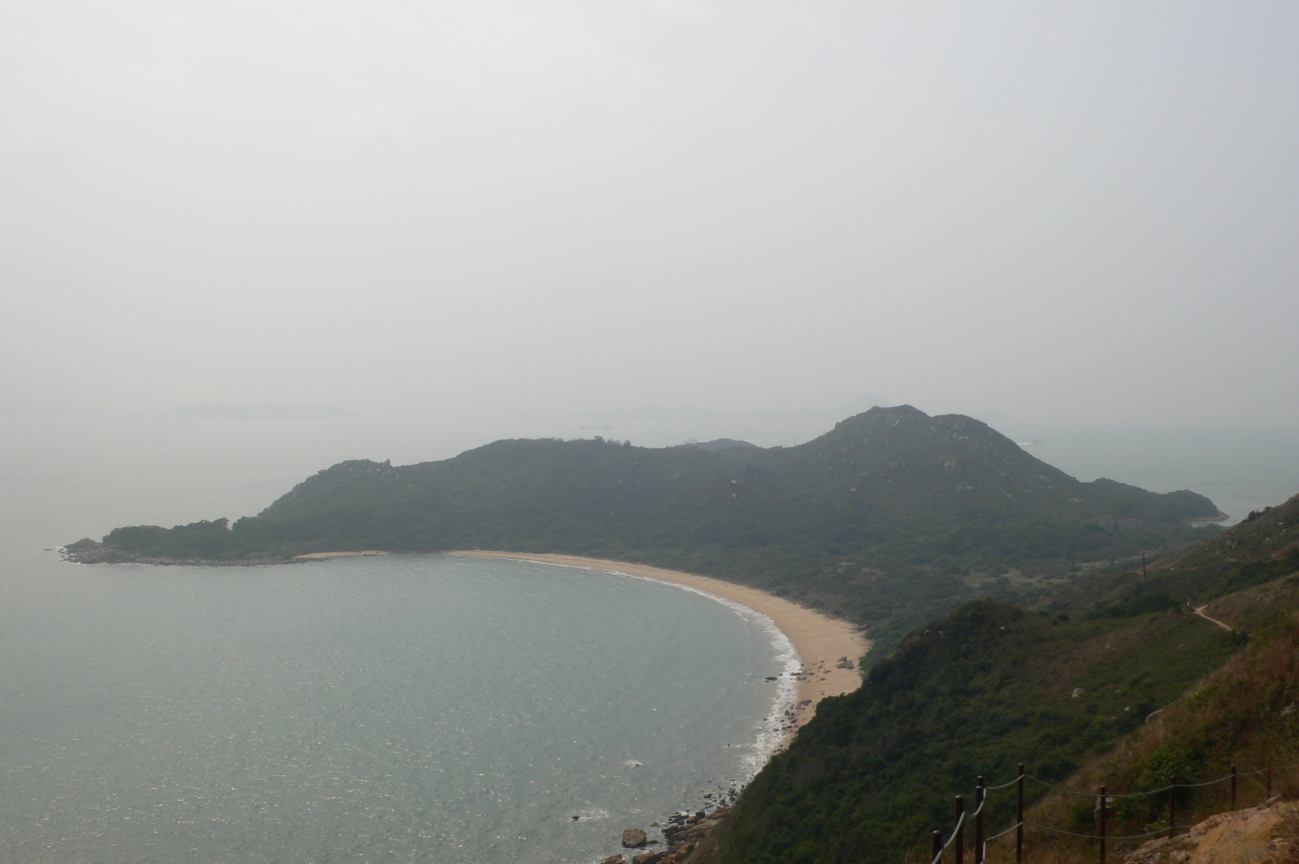
View of Fan Lau and Fan Lau Tung Wan

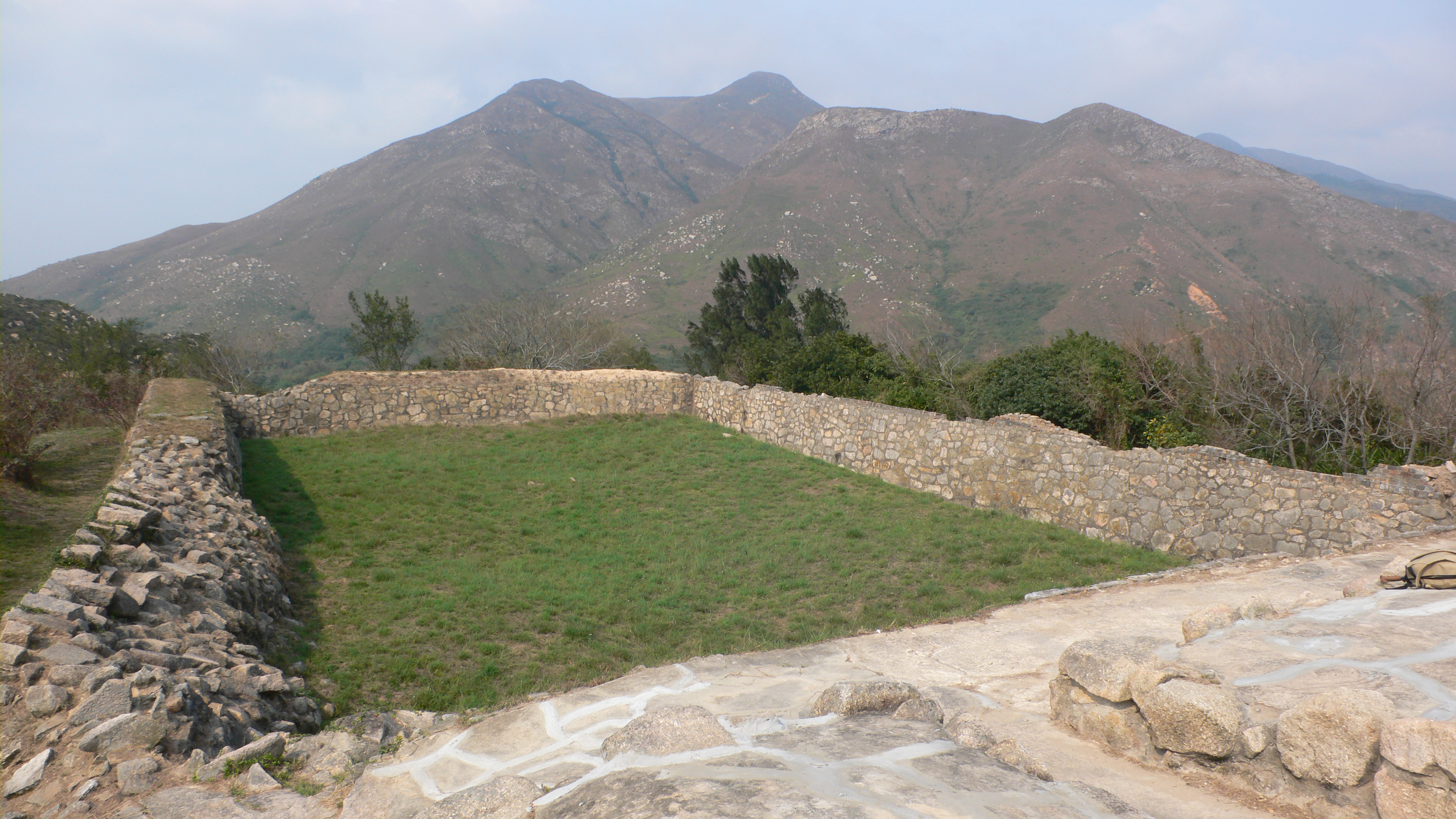
Fan Lau Fort

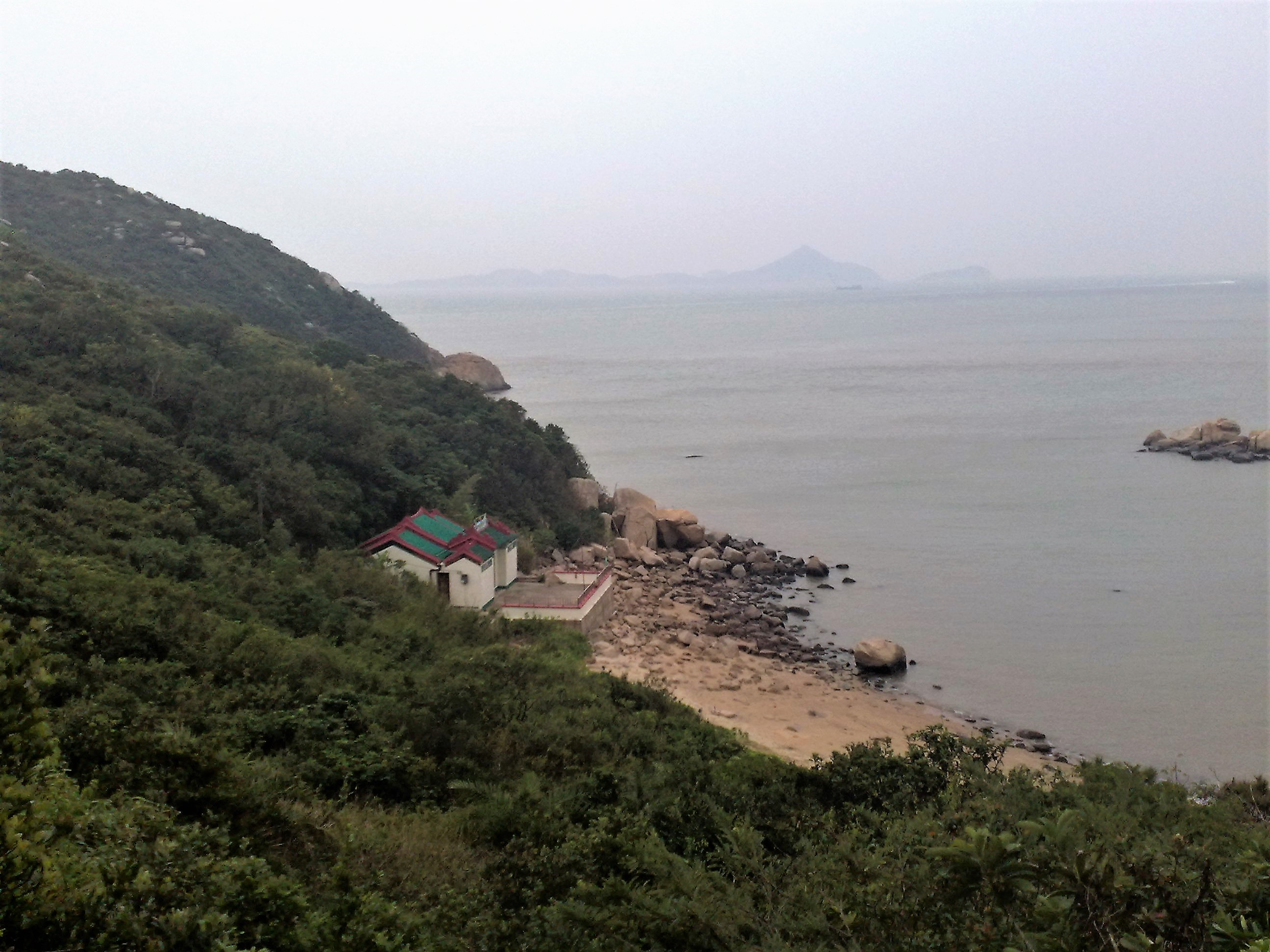
Tin Hau Temple in Fan Lau Miu Wan.

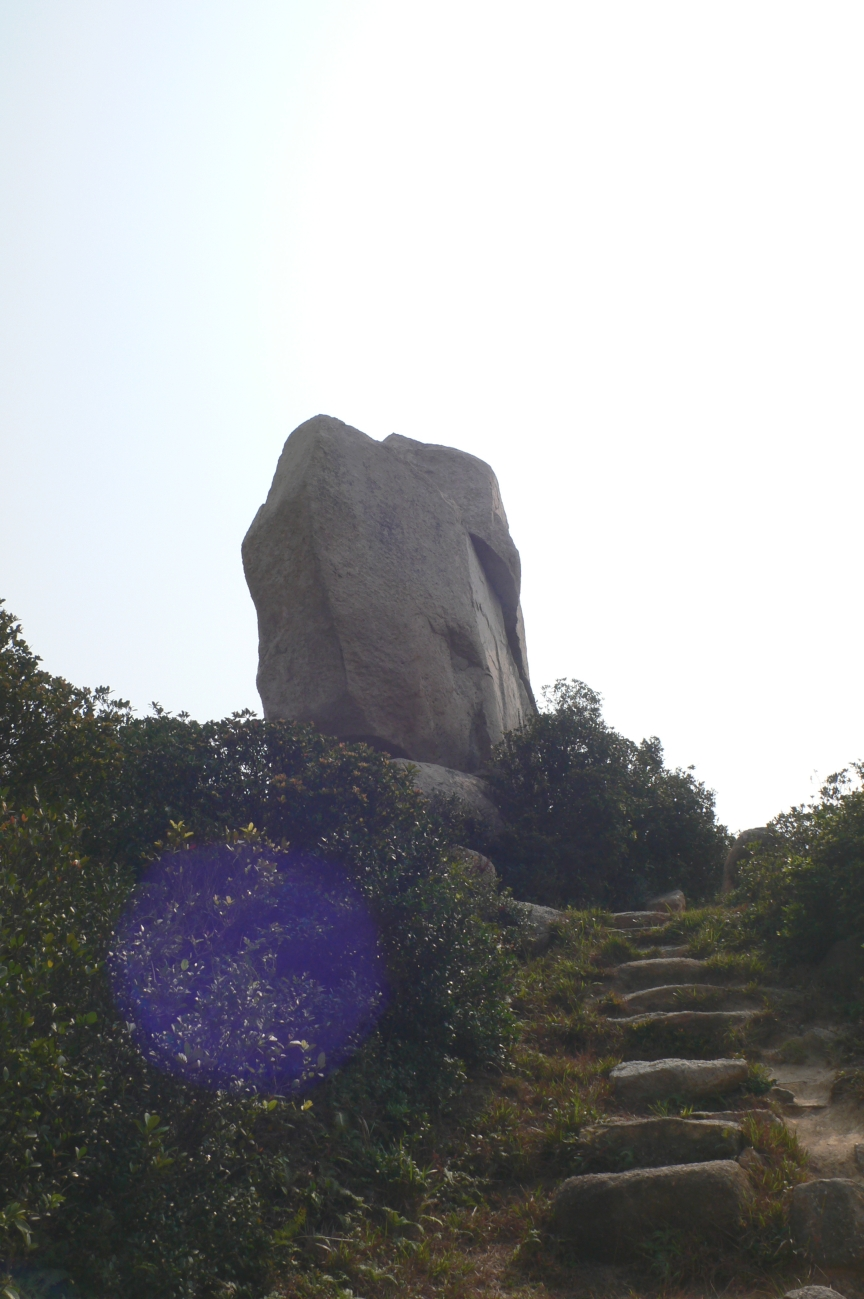
Stone at Fan Lau

Fan Lau (Chinese: 分流) is a peninsula and area in the southwest tip of Lantau Island in Hong Kong. It is also the southwest end the territory of Hong Kong. The very end of the tip is Fan Lau Kok (分流角). The peninsula separates water into Fan Lau Tung Wan (分流東灣; 'East Bay') in the east, and Fan Lau Sai Wan (分流西灣; 'West Bay') and Fan Lau Miu Wan (分流廟灣; 'Temple Bay') in the west.

== Fan Lau Tsuen ==
Fan Lau Tsuen (分流村) is a village on the flat land between the peninsula and the main trunk of Lantau Island. It is located on the west bank of Fan Lau, facing Fan Lau Sai Wan. The village was previously named Shek Sun Village (石筍村, "Village of Stone Shoots") and there were not more than 200 people in the village in the most busy days. Most of the villagers have moved out of the village and some stayed in Tai O and Pui O of Lantau Island In January 1997, only three people were still living in the village.

Fan Lau is a recognized village under the New Territories Small House Policy.

== Features ==
Fan Lau is a Cantonese name that means separating water flows. The tip points to Lantau Channel dividing the current from Pearl River and the water of South China Sea. Due to its military strategic position, Fan Lau Fort was built in Qing Dynasty to defend the territory.

Another archaeological founding on the peninsula is a stone circle of Neolithic and Bronze Age with unidentified purpose. The Stone Circle and Fan Lau Fort are both declared monuments of Hong Kong.

There is also a Tin Hau Temple in Fan Lau Miu Wan. It was probably erected in 1820 and it is a Grade III historic building since 1985.

There is a lighthouse at Fan Lau Kok.

In the late 1980s, the China Light and Power company sought to build a new electricity generating plant in Hong Kong. Many sites were examined, including Gruff Head in Sai Kung, Fan Lau, and Black Point in Tuen Mun. After Gruff Head was rejected by the government in 1989, CLP proposed to build a coal-fired plant at Fan Lau. The plant would have covered an area of 60 hectares, and would have incorporated chimneys, ash lagoons, pylons, and new roads. This was fiercely opposed by major environmental groups in Hong Kong. In 1990, the Fan Lau site was rejected by the government for its "unprecedented level of conflict with the Country Parks Ordinance" and air pollution concerns. Instead, the Black Point Power Station, a gas-fired station, opened near the existing Castle Peak Power Station in 1996.

As with other coastal locations in the region, the coastlines of Fan Lau are marred by accumulation of marine refuse.

== Access ==
Fan Lau is part of the Lantau South Country Park. The stage 7 of Lantau Trail passes near the peninsula. Following the Fan Lau Country Trail allows for the exploration of Fan Lau.
