= List of Grade I historic buildings in Hong Kong =

List of buildings of very high historical significance in Hong Kong

Grade I historic buildings in Hong Kong are those selected as those "outstanding merits of which every effort should be made to preserve if possible".

These buildings may be protected under the Antiquities and Monuments Ordinance; after consulting the Antiquities Advisory Board, with the approval of the Chief Executive and the publication of the notice in government gazette, the Antiquities Authority may legally declare the Graded historic buildings to be protected as Declared Monuments. Five Grade I historic buildings have been demolished in the last two decades.

Note: This list is accurate as of 6 November 2009. A territory-wide grade reassessment has been ongoing since. See this link for the latest grading update.

== Central and Western District ==
ID	Name	Location	Coordinates	Notes/References	Photographs
H0018	Lo Pan Temple	No. 15 Ching Lin Terrace, Kennedy Town			Upload another image
H0206	Old Victoria Barracks, Former Explosives Magazine	Justice Drive, Central			Upload another image
H0008	The Hong Kong Catholic Cathedral of Immaculate Conception	No. 16 Caine Road, Central			Upload another image
H0564	West Point Filters Bungalow	No. 50 Kotewall Road, Mid-Levels		Now part of the Lung Fu Shan Environmental Education Centre.	Upload another image
H0009	Bishop's House	No. 1 Lower Albert Road, Central			Upload another image
H0053	Jamia Mosque	No. 30 Shelley Street, Sheung Wan			Upload another image
H0097	Façade of the Old Mental Hospital	No. 2 High Street, Sai Ying Pun		Now part of the Sai Ying Pun Community Complex.	Upload another image
H0041	Ohel Leah Synagogue	No. 70 Robinson Road, at the junction with Castle Road			Upload another image
HN029	Queen's Pier	Central, Edinburgh Place		Demolition completed in February 2008	Upload another image

== Eastern District ==
ID	Name	Location	Coordinates	Notes/References	Photographs
HN048	Lyemun Barracks (The whole compound)	Lei Yue Mun, Chai Wan			Upload another image
H0039	Lyemun Barracks Block 10				Upload another image
H0082	Lyemun Barracks Block 18				Upload another image
H0114	Lyemun Barracks Block 21				Upload another image
H0036	Lyemun Barracks Block 25				Upload another image
H1053	Tam Kung Temple	Tam Kung Temple Road, Shau Kei Wan			Upload another image

== Islands District ==
ID	Name	Location	Coordinates	Notes/References	Photographs
H0933	Tin Hau Temple	Chek Lap Kok New Village, Wong Lung Hang Road, Tung Chung, Lantau Island			Upload another image
H0208	Yeung Hau Temple	Po Chue Tam, Tai O, Lantau Island		Built in 1699.	Upload another image
H0103	Yuk Hui Temple	Pak She Street, Tung Wan, Cheung Chau		Commonly referred to as Pak Tai Temple	Upload another image

== Kowloon City District ==
ID	Name	Location	Coordinates	Notes/References	Photographs

== Kwun Tong District ==
ID	Name	Location	Coordinates	Notes/References	Photographs
H0367	Ex. Royal Air Force Station (Kai Tak Airport), Headquarters Building	No. 50 Kwun Tong Road, Kowloon Bay, Kowloon		Built in 1934. Kai Tak Vietnamese Refugee Camp from 1979 to 1981. Used for detaining Vietnamese refugees until 1997. Houses the Caritas Family Crisis Support Centre since 2002.	Upload another image
H0365	Ex. Royal Air Force Station (Kai Tak), Officers' Quarters Compound RAF Officers' Mess	No. 51 Kwun Tong Road, Kowloon Bay, Kowloon		Built in 1934. Housed the Police Detective Training School until 2001. Now houses the Academy of Visual Arts, Hong Kong Baptist University.	Upload another image
H0369	Ex. Royal Air Force Station (Kai Tak), Officers' Quarters Compound Annex Block No. 2	No. 51 Kwun Tong Road, Kowloon Bay, Kowloon		Same as above.	Upload another image

== North District ==
ID	Name	Location	Coordinates	Notes/References	Photographs
H0418	Earth God Shrine of Kam Tsin Tsuen	Kam Tsin Tsuen, Sheung Shui, New territories			Upload another image
H0338	Hip Tin Temple	Shan Tsui Tsuen, Sha Tau Kok, New territories			Upload Photo
H0099	Pang Ancestral Hall	Fanling Wai, Fanling, New Territories			Upload another image
H0974	Tin Hau Temple	Sai Ho, Kat O			Upload another image

== Sai Kung District ==
ID	Name	Location	Coordinates	Notes/References	Photographs
H0501	Ham Tin Tsuen	Tai Long			Upload Photo
H0403	Tai Long Tsuen	Tai Long			Upload another image
H0070	Tin Hau Temple, Joss House Bay	Fat Tong Mun (Joss House Bay)			Upload another image

== Sha Tin District ==
ID	Name	Location	Coordinates	Notes/References	Photographs
H0268	Kowloon Reception Reservoir Dam				Upload another image
H0269	Kowloon Reception Reservoir Valve House				Upload another image
H0513	Shing Mun (Jubilee) Reservoir Lower Reservoir Bellmouth Overflow				Upload another image
H0705	Shing Mun (Jubilee) Reservoir Lower Reservoir Pineapple Pass Dam				Upload another image
H0219	Shing Mun (Jubilee) Reservoir Reservoir Steel Bridge				Upload another image
H0569	Shing Mun (Jubilee) Reservoir Lower Reservoir Weir				Upload another image
H0218	Shing Mun (Jubilee) Reservoir Upper Reservoir Gorge Dam				Upload another image
H0220	Shing Mun (Jubilee) Reservoir Upper Reservoir Valve Tower				Upload another image
H0221	Shing Mun (Jubilee) Reservoir Upper Reservoir Bellmouth Overflow				Upload another image
H0220A	Shing Mun (Jubilee) Reservoir Lower Reservoir Valve Tower				Upload another image
H0514	Shing Mun (Jubilee) Reservoir Lower Reservoir Gate Shaft				Upload another image
H0763	Shing Mun (Jubilee) Reservoir Lower Reservoir Supply Basin				Upload another image
H0219A	Shing Mun (Jubilee) Reservoir Upper Reservoir Steel Bridge				Upload another image
H0001	Tsang Tai Uk				Upload another image

== Sham Shui Po District ==
ID	Name	Location	Coordinates	Notes/References	Photographs
H0507	Block 41 (Mei Ho House)	Shek Kip Mei Estate			Upload another image
H0029	Some buildings/military facilities within the Ngong Shuen Chau Barracks	Stonecutters Island		Some buildings/facilities also Grade II and III	Upload another image

== Southern District ==
ID	Name	Location	Coordinates	Notes/References	Photographs
H0353	Stanley Fort, Stanley Battery Gun Emplacement				Upload Photo
H0073	Hung Shing Temple	No. 9 Hung Shing Street, Ap Lei Chau			Upload another image

== Tai Po District ==
ID	Name	Location	Coordinates	Notes/References	Photographs
H0707	Tin Hau Temple Complex	Ha Wai, Tap Mun Chau			Upload another image

== Tsuen Wan District ==
ID	Name	Location	Coordinates	Notes/References	Photographs

== Tuen Mun District ==
ID	Name	Location	Coordinates	Notes/References	Photographs
H0121	Hung Lau	Near Shek Kok Tsui Village, Castle Peak			Upload another image
H0071	To Ancestral Hall	Tuen Tsz Wai, Lam Tei			Upload another image
H0010	Tsing Shan Monastery, Memorial Archway (Heung Hoi Ming Shan)	Castle Peak			Upload another image
H0088	Tsing Shan Monastery, Tai Hung Po Din	Castle Peak			Upload another image
H0160	Tsing Shan Monastery, Hall of Kshitigabha	Castle Peak			Upload another image
H0164	Tsing Shan Monastery, Gate House	Castle Peak			Upload another image
H0200	Tsing Shan Monastery, Wu Fat Din	Castle Peak			Upload another image
H0379	Tsing Shan Monastery, Memorial Archway	Castle Peak			Upload another image
H0441	Tsing Shan Monastery, Home for the Monks and the Aged	Castle Peak			Upload Photo
H0529	Tsing Shan Monastery, Guest Hall	Castle Peak			Upload another image
H0533	Tsing Shan Monastery, Quarters	Castle Peak			Upload another image
H0538	Tsing Shan Monastery, Kwun Yam Pavilion	Castle Peak			Upload another image
H0903	Tsing Shan Monastery, Hall of Merits	Castle Peak			Upload another image

== Wan Chai District ==
ID	Name	Location	Coordinates	Notes/References	Photographs
H0124	Nam Koo Terrace	No. 55 Ship Street			Upload another image
H0076	Blue House	No. 72, 72a, 74, 74A Stone Nullah Lane		considered as 4 historic buildings	Upload another image
H0111	Hung Shing Temple	No. 129-131 Queen's Road East			Upload another image
H0103	Yuk Hui Temple	No. 2 Lung On Street		Commonly referred to as Pak Tai Temple	Upload another image
H0035	Lin Fa Temple	Lin Fa Kung Street West, Tai Hang			Upload another image

== Wong Tai Sin District ==
ID	Name	Location	Coordinates	Notes/References	Photographs
H0467A	St. Joseph's Home for the Aged (whole site)	Ngau Chi Wan, Kowloon			Upload another image
H0524	Dormitory A, St. Joseph's Home for the Aged	Clear Water Bay Road, Ngau Chi Wan			Upload another image
H0523	Gate House, St. Joseph's Home for the Aged	Ngau Chi Wan, Kowloon			Upload another image
H0467	Villa, St. Joseph's Home for the Aged	Ngau Chi Wan, Kowloon			Upload another image
H0060	Hau Wong Temple	Cr. of Junction Road and Tung Tau Tsuen Road			Upload another image

== Yau Tsim Mong District ==
ID	Name	Location	Coordinates	Notes/References	Photographs
H0058	Lui Seng Chun	119 Lai Chi Kok Road, New Kowloon			Upload another image
H0453	Nos. 600-626 Shanghai Street	Specifically Nos. 600, 602, 604, 606, 612, 614, 620, 622, 624 and 626 Shanghai Street, Mong Kok		tong-laus	Upload another image
H0185	The Engineer's Office of the Former Pumping Station, Water Supplies Department	Shanghai Street, Yau Ma Tei			Upload another image
H0133	Kowloon West II Battery of Whitfield Barracks	Kowloon Park, Tsim Sha Tsui		Now converted into a children's "Discovery Playground" within the park.	Upload another image
H0015	Tung Wah Museum, in Kwong Wah Hospital,	25 Waterloo Road, Yau Ma Tei			Upload another image

== Yuen Long District ==
ID	Name	Location	Coordinates	Notes/References	Photographs
H0012	Kun Ting Study Hall	Hang Mei Tsuen, Ping Shan		Part of the Ping Shan Heritage Trail.	Upload another image
H0075	Man Ancestral Hall	Fan Tin Tsuen, San Tin			Upload another image
H0028	Pun Uk	Au Tau			Upload another image
H0098	Entrance Hall of Shut Hing Study Hall	Tong Fong Tsuen, Ping Shan		Part of the Ping Shan Heritage Trail	Upload another image
H0141	Tang Ching Lok Ancestral Hall	Pak Wai Tsuen, Kam Tin			Upload another image
H0380	Yu Yuen	Tung Tau Wai, Wang Chau		Built in 1927 as a summer villa.	Upload another image
H0381	Yuen Kwan Tai Temple	Mong Tseng Wai, Ping Shan			Upload another image
H0668	Tin Hau Temple	Off Tai Shu Ha Road, Tai Kei Leng/Nga Yiu Tau, Shap Pat Heung		Called the "Tai Shu Ha Tin Hau Temple" (大樹下天后廟), it got its name from being a Tin Hau Temple under a tree.	Upload another image
H0011	Ching Shu Hin	Hang Mei Tsuen, Ping Shan		Part of the Ping Shan Heritage Trail.	Upload another image
H0190	Tai Wong Temple	No. 26C Cheung Shing Street, Yuen Long Kau Hui			Upload another image
H0147	Tat Tak Communal Hall	North-west of Sheung Cheung Wai, Ping Shan		In the area covered by the Ping Shan Heritage Trail.	Upload another image
H0116	Tin Hau Temple	Fung Chi Tsuen, Ping Shan			Upload another image
H0204	Yuen Kwan Yi Tai Temple	Yuen Long Kau Hui		Commonly known as Pak Tai Temple, it is dedicated to Yuen Tai/Pak Tai and Kwan Tai.	Upload another image

== See also ==
- List of buildings and structures in Hong Kong
- Heritage conservation in Hong Kong
- Declared monuments of Hong Kong
- List of Grade II historic buildings in Hong Kong
- List of Grade III historic buildings in Hong Kong
- Heritage Trails in Hong Kong
- History of Hong Kong
