= Tsing Shan Monastery =

Monastery in Hong Kong

Coordinates: 22°23′31″N 113°57′33″E

- 青山禪院
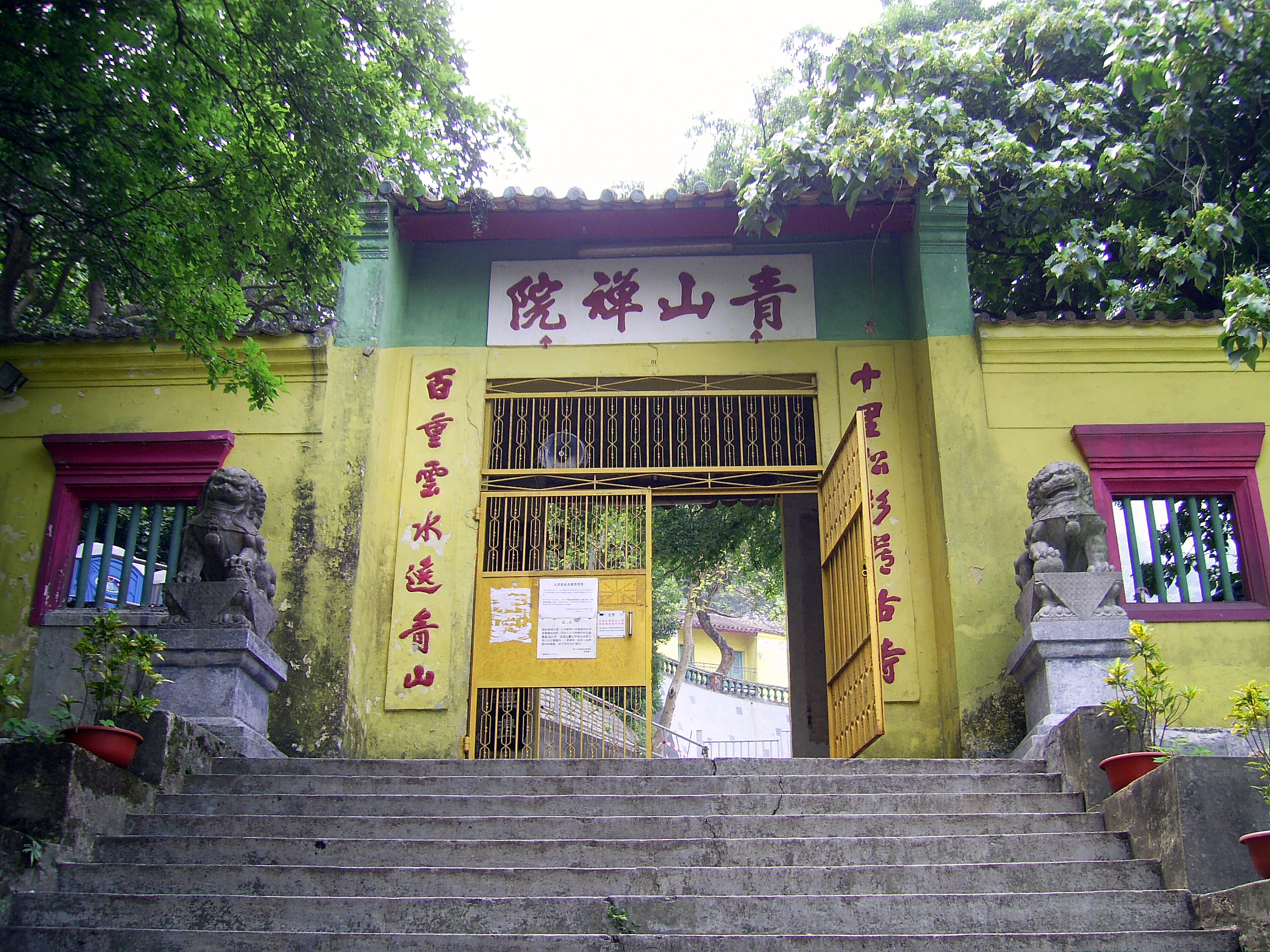
- Tsing Shan Monastery Front Gate
- Interactive map of Tsing Shan Monastery

Monastery information
- Order: Buddhist

Architecture
- Heritage designation: Grade I historic building

Site
- Location: Castle Peak, Hong Kong

Tsing Shan Monastery
- Traditional Chinese: 青山禪院
Transcriptions
Standard Mandarin
- Hanyu Pinyin: Qīngshān Chán Yuàn
Yue: Cantonese
- Yale Romanization: Chīng sāan sìhm yuhn
- Jyutping: Cing1 saan1 sim4 jyun2
- IPA: [tɕʰɪ́ŋsáːn ɕȉːm jy̌ːn]

Hong Kong Graded Building – Grade I

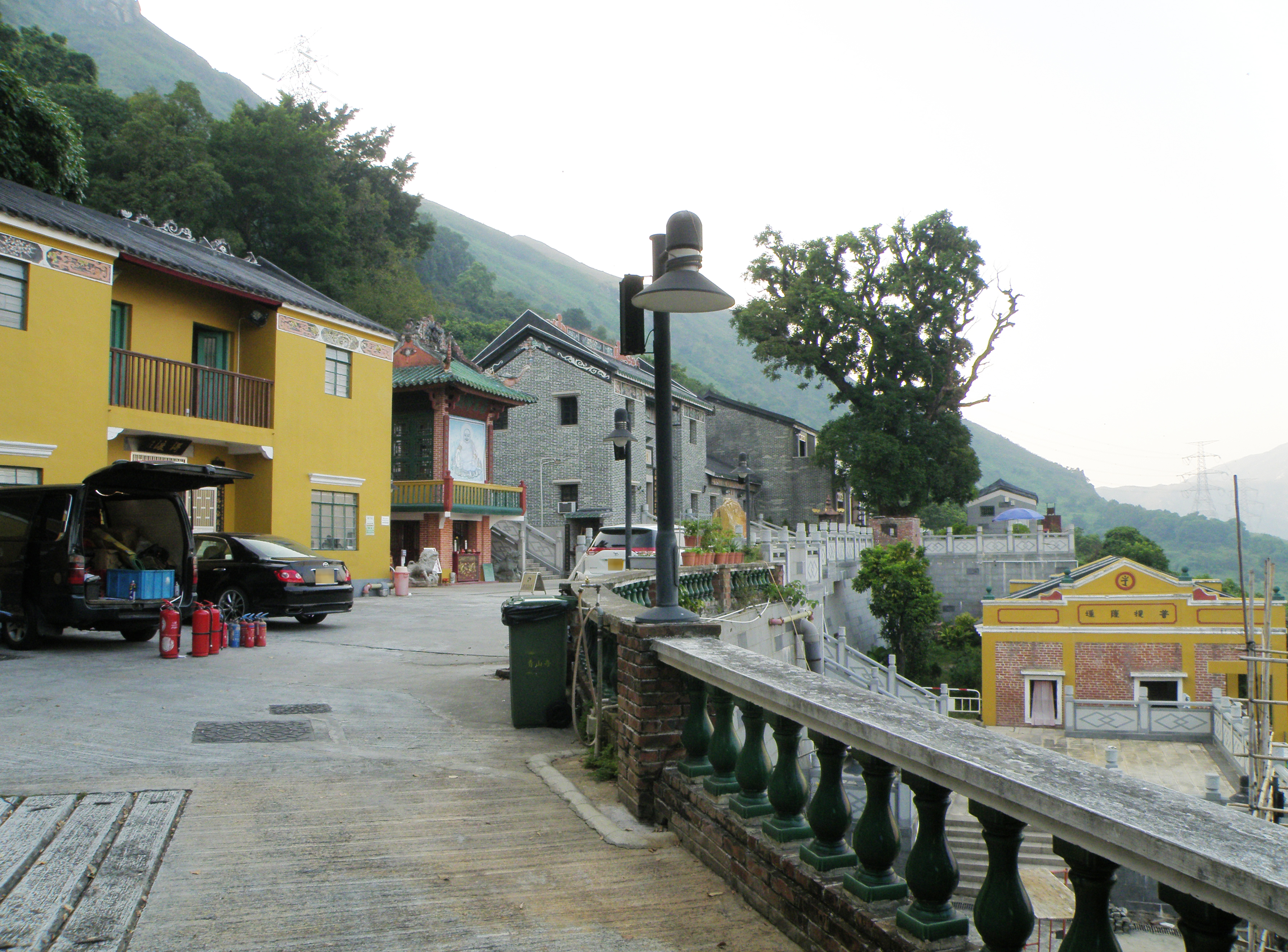
Tsing Shan Monastery

The Tsing Shan Monastery, also known as Castle Peak Monastery, is situated at the foot of Castle Peak, near Tuen Mun, Hong Kong. Parts of the monastery are listed as Grade I historic buildings, others are listed as Grade II historic buildings.

== Overview ==
Inside there are the Pui To Pagoda, Tsing Wan Koon (青雲觀) and the Tsing Shan Temple. These historical monuments have stood through the ages in the tranquil wooded area. The striking and picturesque surroundings create an enjoyable view as well as a solemn ambiance. Upon entering the monastery, the words "香海名山" (Fragrant Sea and Prestigious Mountain) will be perceived engraved on the portico. It is a caption by the former governor Sir Cecil Clementi. On the reverse side are the words "回頭是岸" (Repentance is Salvation), an inscription by Reverend Tit Xim. Originating from Shiwan, the crest tile of the archway is a delicate art treasure.

== Origin ==
According to legend, an Indian monk who liked travelling in a wooden cup was believed to have lodged where the monastery now stands. Attracted by the natural wonders and the serene milieu, he built a chalet there for practicing meditation. Since then, the name of Reverend Pui To (杯渡禪師; 'travelling in a cup') has become widespread. In memory of him, his followers built a pagoda at the place where he formerly resided. At the back of the pagoda was a statue of Reverend Pui To. The time of construction, however, cannot be ascertained. Some say the Pui To Pagoda was built in the Jin dynasty and redeveloped in the Song dynasty. Regular maintenance works has kept the historical relic's original appearance intact.

Adjoining to the Main Worship Hall is Ching Wan Koon, which is dedicated to Dou Lao, a goddess who is believed to be able to relieve people from their worries.

The Tsing Shan Temple is the eldest amongst the temples in Hong Kong. There is a main worship hall inside the temple and the writing "一切有情、同登覺地" (Everything on Earth Has Ties and Reaches Nirvana Together) could be seen in front of the stairs leading to the hall. The peaceful environment of this Buddhist Temple offers an abiding sense of harmony.
