= Crédit Foncier d'Extrême-Orient =

Former Belgian colonial bank

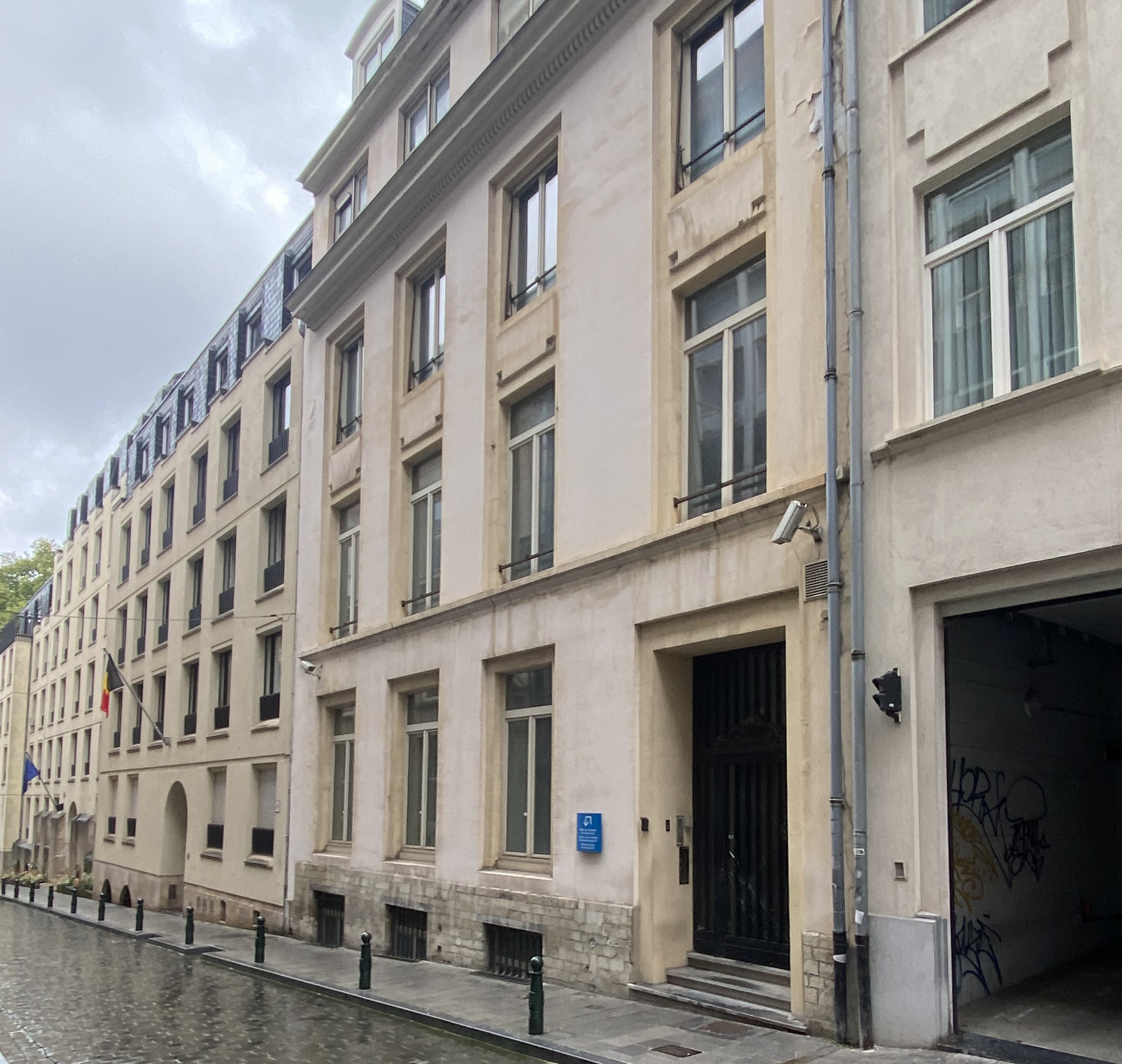
Former seat of the general management of CFEO in Brussels, rue Thérésienne 11

The Crédit Foncier d'Extrême-Orient (CFEO, lit. 'Land Mortgage Bank of the Far East') was a colonial bank headquartered in Brussels, known from its foundation in 1907 to 1910 as the Société Franco-belge de Tien-Tsin (lit. 'Tianjin Franco-Belgian Company'). Its activity was mainly in China and around the Strait of Malacca. It was liquidated in 1959.

== Overview ==
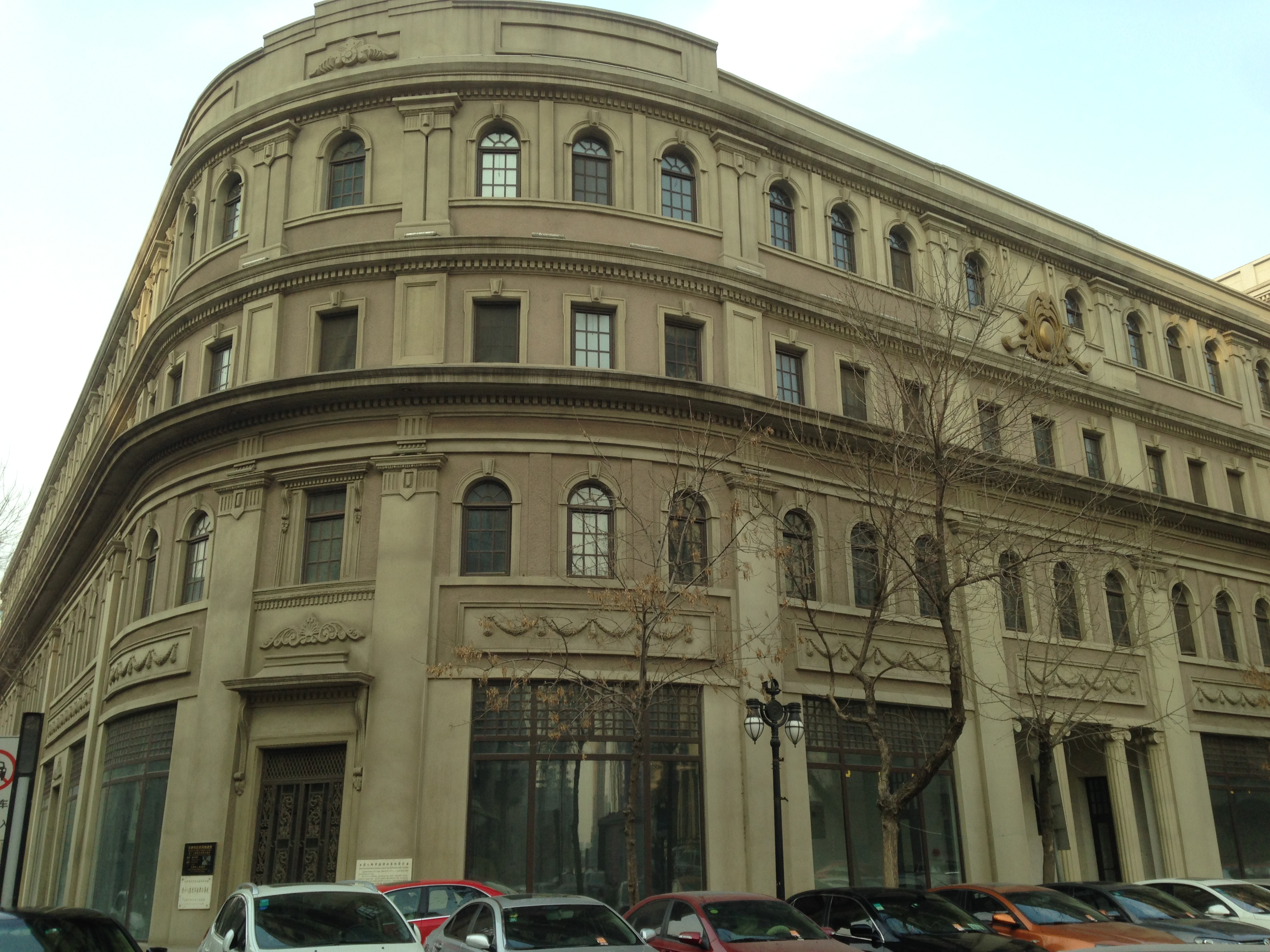
Yipin Building, the CFEO office in Tianjin, completed in 1933

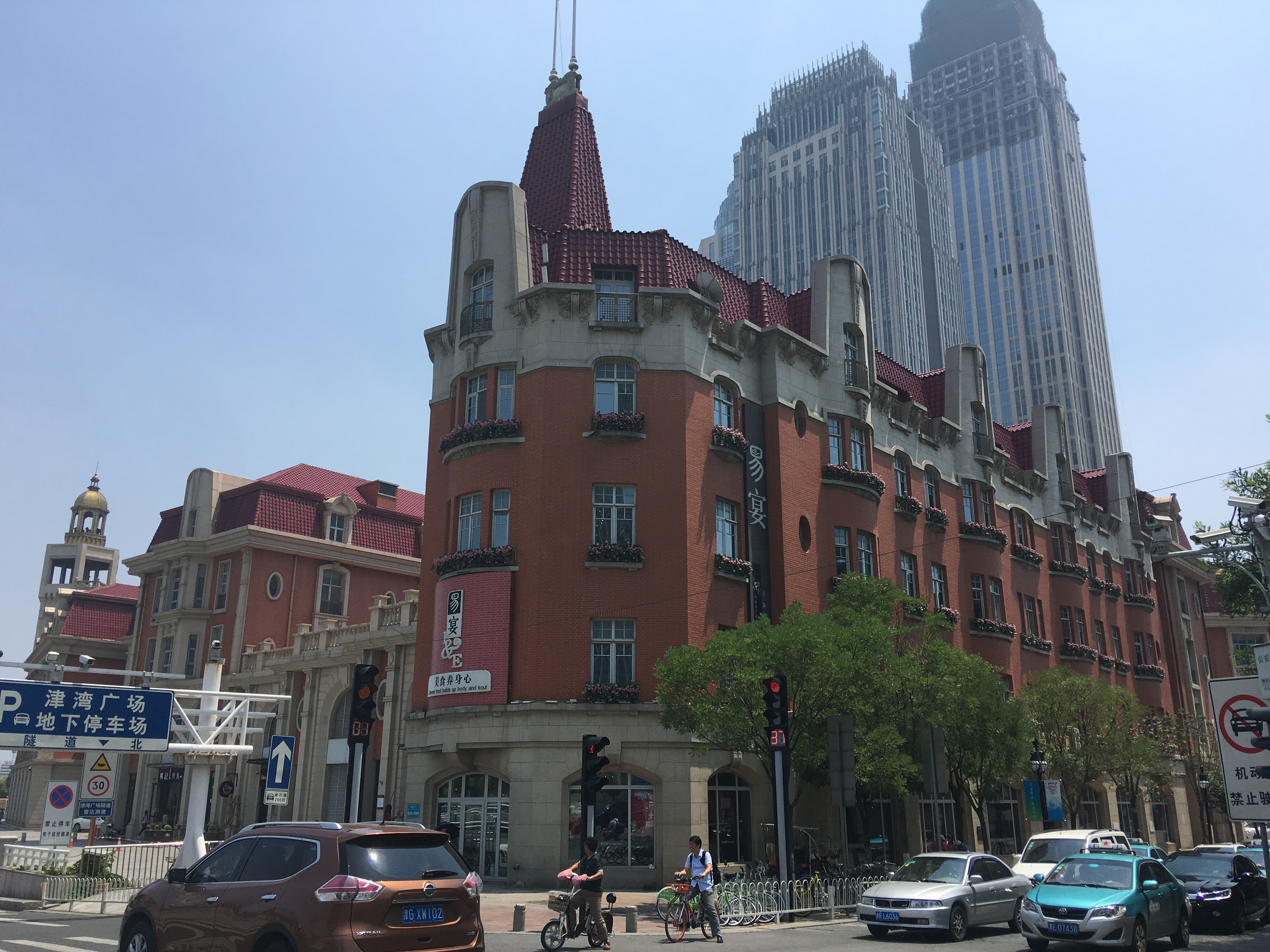
Belfran Building in Tianjin (1927), a residential property developed by the CFEO ("Belfran" was the CFEO's code in telegraphy)

The Société franco-belge de Tien-Tsin was created on 3 August 1907, by a group of Belgian and French banks including the Banque d'Outremer and its China-focused affiliate the Compagnie Internationale d'Orient, the Banque de Paris et des Pays-Bas, and the Banque de l'Indochine among others, with the initial aim of developing a large plot of land in the French concession in Tianjin. Its board was initially chaired by Albert Thys, chairman of the Banque d'Outremer. Headquartered in Thys's offices at 13, rue Bréderode in Brussels, it initially opened branches in Tianjin and Shanghai. In 1910, it changed its name to Crédit Foncier d'Extrême-Orient.

It further opened agencies in Hankou and Hong Kong in 1911, Beijing in 1915, and Jinan in 1918. In 1923, it participated in the creation of the Crédit Foncier de l'Indochine in French Indochina, together with the French Banque de l'Indochine and Société Financière Française et Coloniale. In the late 1920s the bank pivoted to investment in the British Straits Settlements to hedge against monetary instability in China. It thus closed its offices in Beijing and Jinan and opened new agencies in Singapore in 1927, Malacca and Muar in 1929, and Ipoh in 1930. during that period, the CFEO employed dozens of architects in China, Hong Kong and Singapore who also designed buildings for third parties, such as the Yien Yieh Commercial Bank branch in Hankou or the St. Joseph's Home for the Aged in Hong Kong. Most of the CFEO's employees were imprisoned in Japanese camps from September 1944 to August 1945.

By 1946, the bank’s head office (French: direction) was at 11 rue Thérésienne in Brussels, one block away from its registered address (French: siège social) which remained at 13 rue Bréderode together with the Compagnie du Congo pour le Commerce et l'Industrie and other affiliates of the Société Générale de Belgique. Its Parisian office was hosted by the Banque de l'Indochine at 96, boulevard Haussmann.

In 1949, the CFEO's activities in China were disrupted by the Chinese Communist Revolution. In 1952, it sponsored the creation of an affiliate entity in the Tangier International Zone, the Société Hypothécaire de Tanger, with involvement of the Banque de l'Indochine, Crédit Tangérois, Crédit Foncier de l'Indochine, and Crédit Foncier de l'Ouest Africain. in 1955, its operations in the People's Republic of China were terminated, simultaneously as those of all other foreign banks in the country, and in the late 1950s it sold most of its real estate in Hong Kong and Singapore.

For fear of nationalization, the CFEO was liquidated on 2 March 1959 and its assets and liabilities transferred to a newly formed Belgian entity, the Crédit Foncier International, which in turn was eventually wound up in 1991.

Belfran Road in Kowloon, Hong Kong perpetuates the CFEO's telegraphy code, itself referring to the bank's original Belgo-French identity.

== See also ==
- Crédit Foncier d'Algérie et de Tunisie
- List of banks in Belgium
