= Pui To =

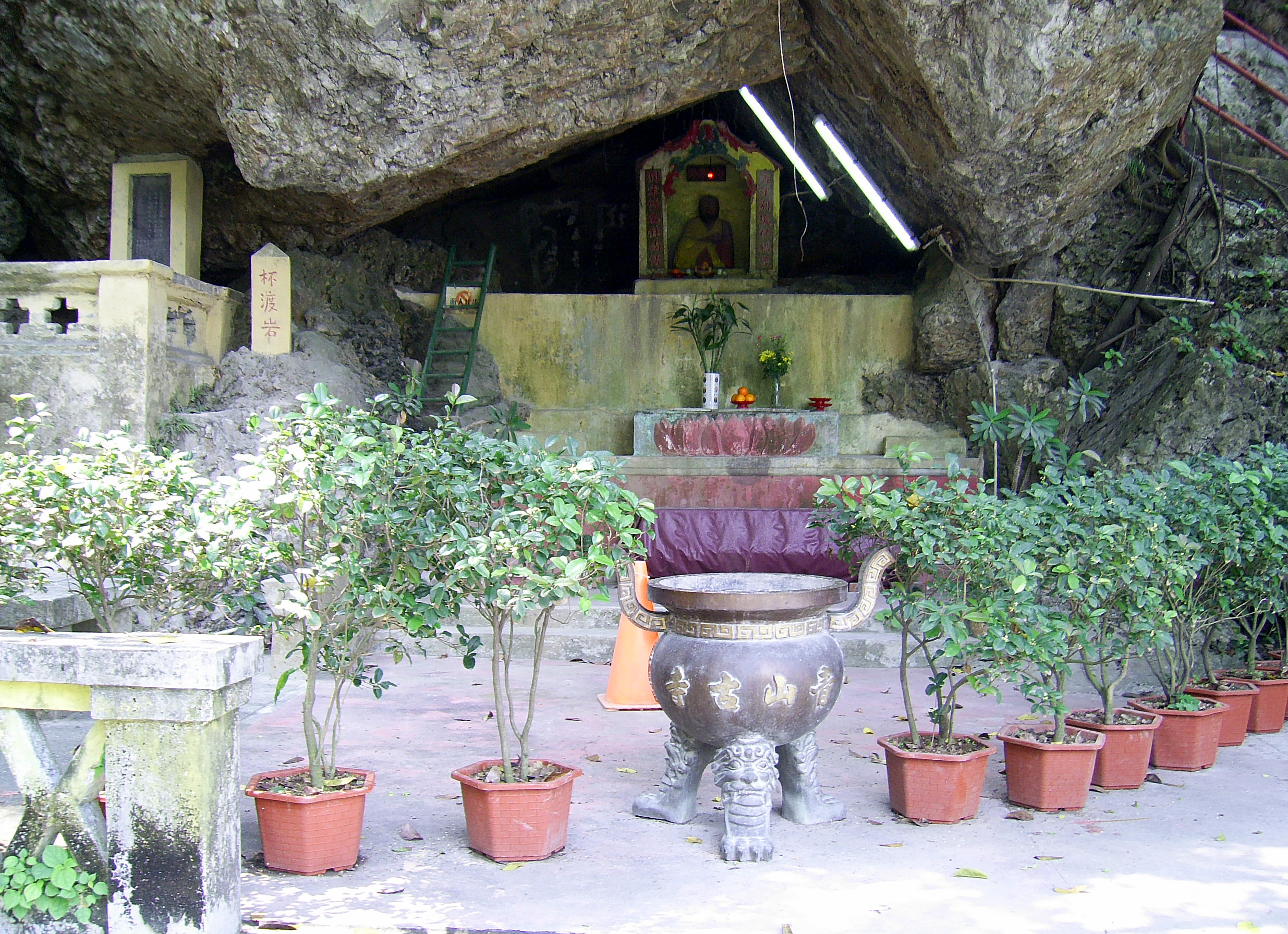
The Tsing Shan Monastery

Pui To (Chinese: 杯渡) was a Buddhist monk living at the time of the Liu Song dynasty in the Northern and Southern dynasties.

The legend has it that he once went to Tuen Mun in the New Territories of Hong Kong to construct roads, and he lived at a big cave at the present-day Castle Peak. It is believed that the Tsing Shan Monastery, the Pui To stop of the MTR light rail and the Pui To Road of Hong Kong are named after him.
