= Mong Tseng Tsuen =

Coordinates: 22.477053°N 114.000725°E

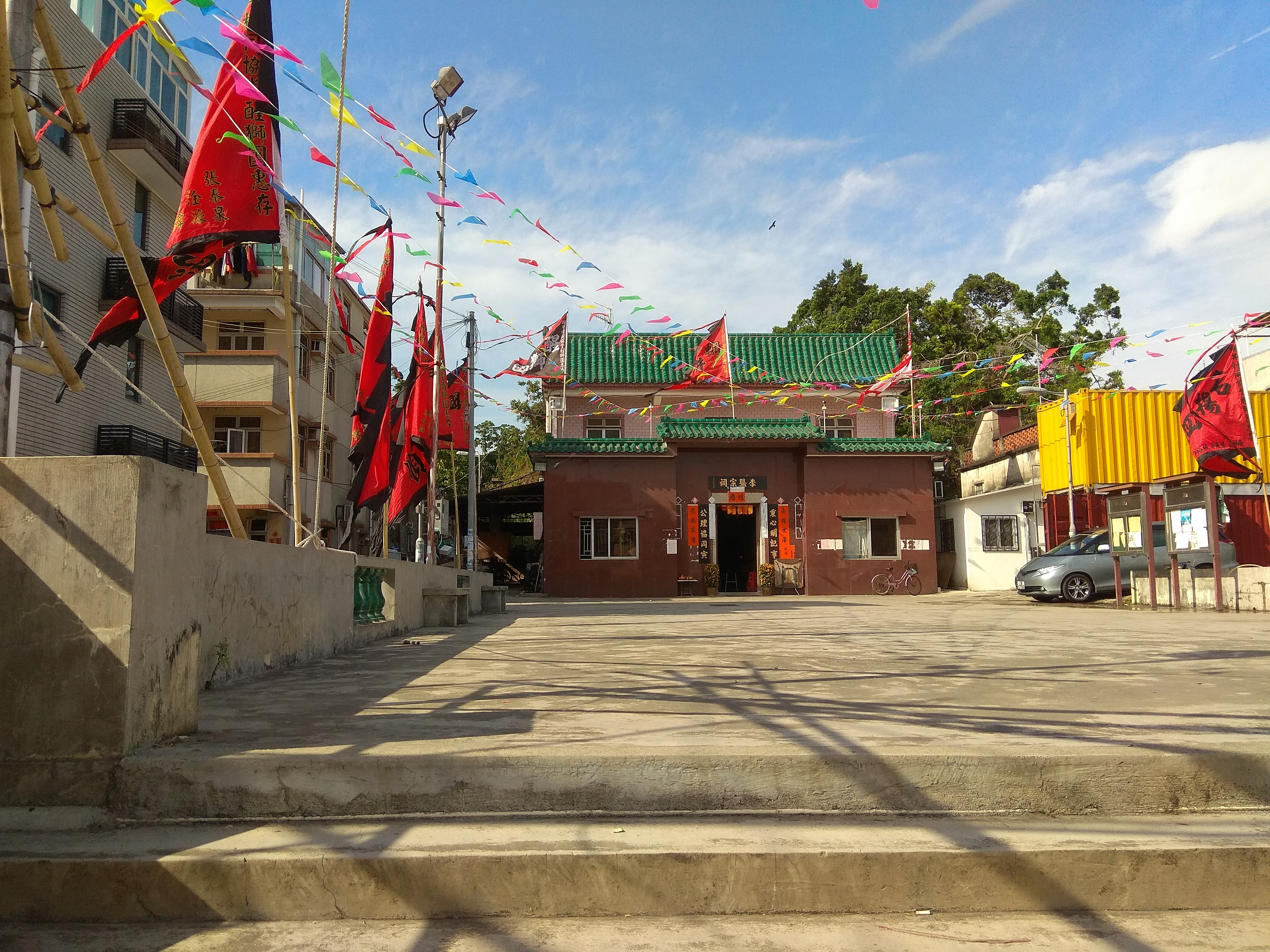
Mong Tseng Tsuen.

Mong Tseng Tsuen (Chinese: 輞井村) is a village in Yuen Long District, New Territories, Hong Kong.

== Administration ==
Mong Tseng Tsuen is a recognized village under the New Territories Small House Policy.

== See also ==
- Mong Tseng Wai
