= St. Joseph's Home for the Aged =

Historic buildings in Hong Kong

Coordinates: 22.3347°N 114.2105°E

- 聖若瑟安老院
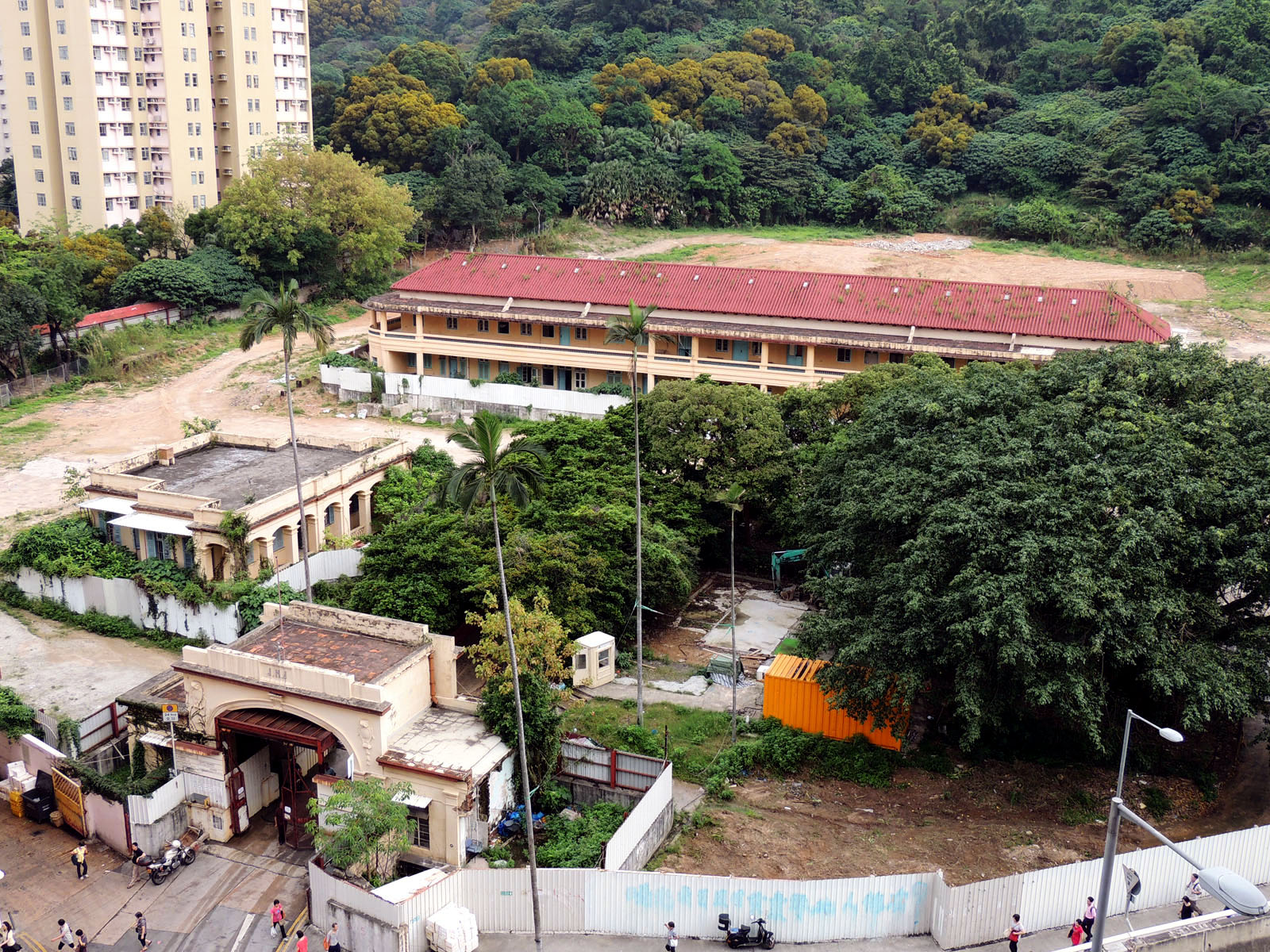
- View of the historic buildings in 2012

General information
- Type: Grade II historic building
- Architectural style: Neo-classical
- Location: No. 35 Clear Water Bay Road, Ngau Chi Wan
- Completed: 1930s

Design and construction
- Architecture firm: Crédit Foncier d'Extrême-Orient

St. Joseph's Home for the Aged
- Traditional Chinese: 聖若瑟安老院
Transcriptions
Yue: Cantonese
- Yale Romanization: Sing yeuhk sāt ōn lóuh yún
- Jyutping: Sing3 yoek6 sat1 on1 lou5 jyun2

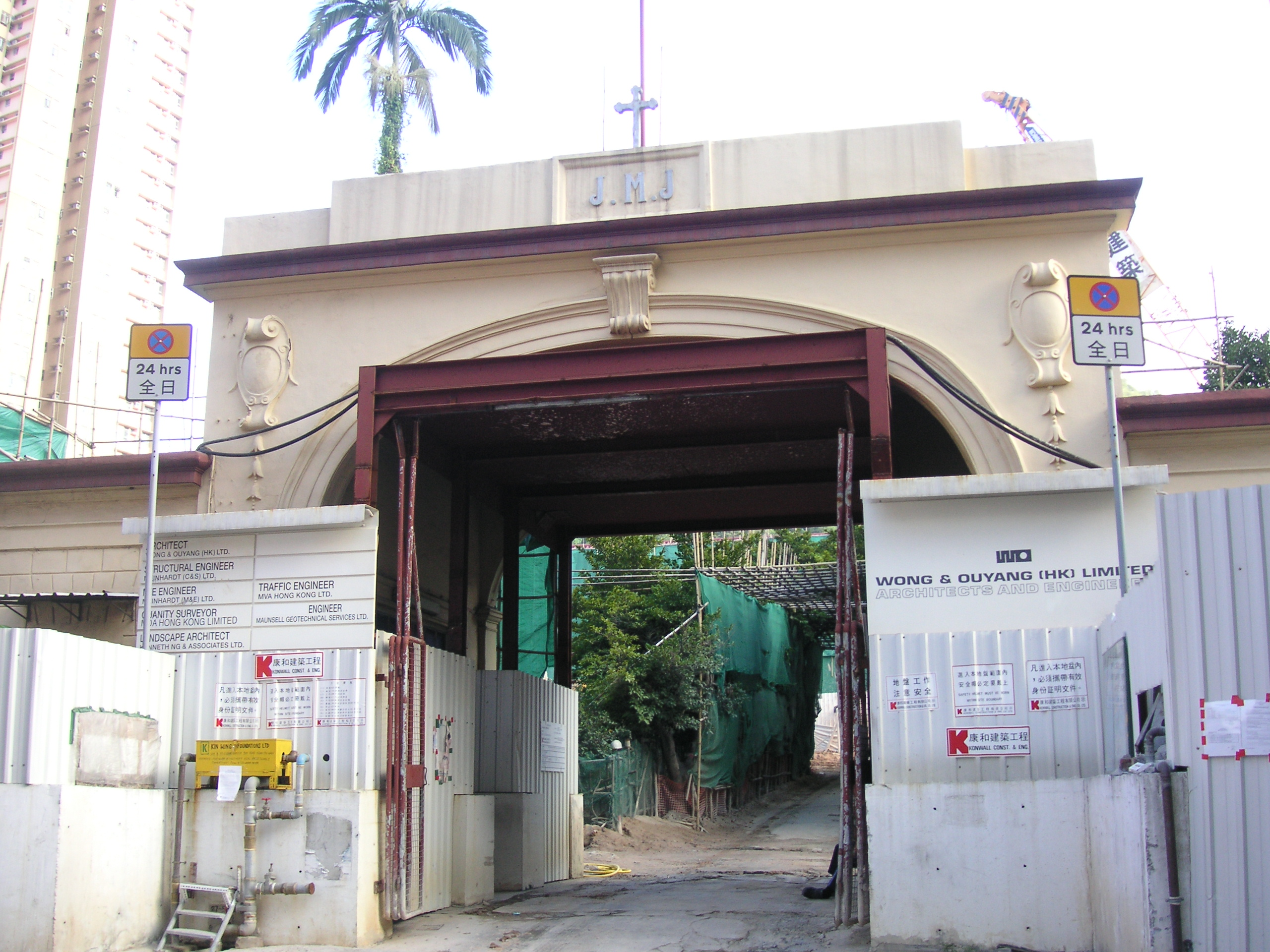
Gate House in 2005

St. Joseph's Home for the Aged is located at No. 35 Clear Water Bay Road, Ngau Chi Wan, Wong Tai Sin, New Kowloon, Hong Kong. The site spans 230,000 square feet (21,000 m^{2}).

St. Joseph's Home for the Aged refers to a compound of historical buildings; more than 10 buildings at its peak. The site was not originally a home for the elderly, but a villa (or storey-house) belonging to Mr. Chan Keng-Yu (陳賡如). This added historical significance to the compound as Mr. Chan Keng-Yu was the Compradore of Douglas Lapraik (Note: Spelled as ‘Laprik’ in Government provided information.) and Co., as well as one of the Founding Directors of Chinese Chamber of Commerce (Note: In 1950, the chamber changed its name to ‘Chinese General Chamber of Commerce’.) (華商總會).

In 1926, the site was sold to the Little Sisters of the Poor, a French-based charitable body and Roman Catholic order for women. The Crédit Foncier d'Extrême-Orient was in charge of the development of St. Joseph's Home for the Aged in the 1930s.

During the 1930s, St. Joseph's Home for the Aged served as a refuge for those who fled from the Japanese invasion in China.

== Grading ==
Despite the proposal of a grade 2 classification, the entire site, villa, gate house, and dormitory A all kept their classification as grade 1 historical buildings on 18 September 2009.

== Parts of the compound ==
=== The Villa ===
The villa was the first building of the compound and dates back to 1919. It is a single-storey bungalow of neo-classical colonial style. It has a colonnaded verandah: 8 Doric-styled columns supporting the entablature on segmental arches. The roof of the villa was found to be flat, but there are indications that it may have been originally, a Chinese tiled pitched roof. Double entry steps introduce the front of the verandah.

The villa served as the quarters for the Little Sisters of the Poor until the relocation of the Sisters and the residents of the home.

=== The Gate House ===
As a later addition by the Little Sisters of the Poor, the gate house was built in the mid-1930s. It followed the neo-classical style of the villa: it had pilasters of the Doric order. A tablet, placed at the centre of the front façade, was inscribed with the initials ‘JMJ’. It represented the recurring motto of the Little Sisters of the Poor: "Jesus, Mary & Joseph" in memory of the Holy Family.

=== Dormitory A ===
Dormitory A was built around 1932-1933. Unlike the villa and the gate house, dormitory A was constructed in a Modernist or Art Deco style. More specifically, it has adapted the "Liner Style", as its features bear resemblance to ocean liners of the period: it has a linear plan, horizontal banding, rounded corners, and plain round columns. The roof is a Chinese tiled pitched roof, imitating the waves of the sea.

=== St. Joseph's Chapel, and Dormitories B and C ===
St. Joseph's Chapel and dormitories B and C have been demolished.

== Redevelopment ==
In 2000, St. Joseph's Home for the Aged attracted the attention of the Antiquities and Monuments Office, which recommended to the Antiquities Advisory Board that the various buildings on the site are to be classified as historic. But if the recommendation was approved, it could prevent the conclusion of an agreement with land developers: the redevelopment of the site in exchange for a new and better facilitated home in the New Territories. This is because the land developers may feel that the profit margins are low due to the high costs of preserving the historic parts of the site.

In addition, millions of dollars were spent each year on maintenance in compliance with fire and safety standards alone. As the home is financially reliant on public donations and fund-raising, it follows that a new home may be preferable as it would cost less to run.

The redevelopment situation of St. Joseph's Home for the Aged is a clear example of the history vs. progress debate, with the government wanting to conserve the heritage, while the land developer hoping to maximise the redevelopment potential of the land. In 2001, the entire site and its various buildings were classified as grade 1 historical buildings. Note that a grade 1 classification does not necessarily mean that the historical building is a declared monument. Nevertheless, a solution which reconciled the conflicting objects was found in 2002, when the Government proposed a ‘transfer of development rights’ ("TDR") scheme. David Lung Ping-yee described the scheme as a win-win situation for both the government and the land developers. Other analysts have also acknowledged that the scheme could conserve the heritage of Hong Kong whilst advancing urban development and progress.

In 2002, Polytec Holdings obtained the development rights on the condition that a new home would be built in Sheung Shui to accommodate the residents of St. Joseph's Home for the Aged. Kowloon Development conditionally agreed to obtain the development rights from Polytec Holdings, its controlling shareholder. It would pay HKD 520 million to the Little Sisters of the Poor. Included in this figure were all costs and expenses, such as the payment of land premium. Kowloon Development planned to invest HKD 5 billion to redevelop the site into a commercial-residential project. Mr. Dickson Lai, the executive director of the developer, expected the redevelopment project to be completed by 2006. However, the developer must preserve the historical buildings, namely the villa, the gate house, and dormitory A of St. Joseph's Home for the Aged. Preservation details were discussed with the Antiquities and Monuments Office.

In 2003, residents of St. Joseph's Home for the Aged moved to their new home in Sheung Shui.

In December 2004, the Town Planning Board ("TPB") gave conditional approval of a redevelopment project. The TPB required the developers to consult the Wong Tai Sin District Council on the redevelopment plan. On 11 January 2005, the 8th meeting of the Wong Tai Sin District Council discussed the redevelopment of St. Joseph's Home for the Aged. Members of the district council expressed approval of the development plan. It was concluded that the developers, Kowloon Development, would preserve part of the site by incorporating the three historic buildings inside a shopping mall. These buildings would be exhibited in the future; predicted to take place 3 years after the completion of the redevelopment project. Traffic arrangements concerning the redevelopment were also discussed.

=== District Council comments on the redevelopment project ===
The problem of transportation has long been the major concern of the District Councilors of Wong Tai Sin District in evaluating the feasibility of the project. They were worried that the traffic system would be under great pressure, especially around Clear Water Bay Road and Fung Shing Street, given the population injection due to people moving into the newly constructed housing estate.

Other councilors stressed on the historical value of the site and expressed their will of preservation. The social trend in preserving cultural heritage also made the realization of the project more difficult. The developer was unable to reach an agreement on the adjustments of the contract.

However, other councilors held the developer socially responsible in cooperating with the District Council and the Land Department to build the connecting facilities. They have also suggested that the developer ought to consult the local community in the district for more useful.

Some councilors expressed appreciation for the concept of grouping modern buildings with old architecture. They regard this as an effort to record different times and classes in Wong Tai Sin. The councilors pointed recommended an area is to be reserved for the purpose of public appreciation of the old architecture, as well as holding cultural or history exhibitions. In addition, the original buildings can be further developed as part of the historical compound of the district. The suggesting councilor asked the developer to conduct further research for the purpose of comparing the site to neighboring heritage sites, such as Sam Shan Kwok Wong Temple and Pak Fa Lam.

=== Government commitments ===
The government announced that the project to be one of the biggest redevelopment projects in relation to historical buildings. It can provide the following public facilities:

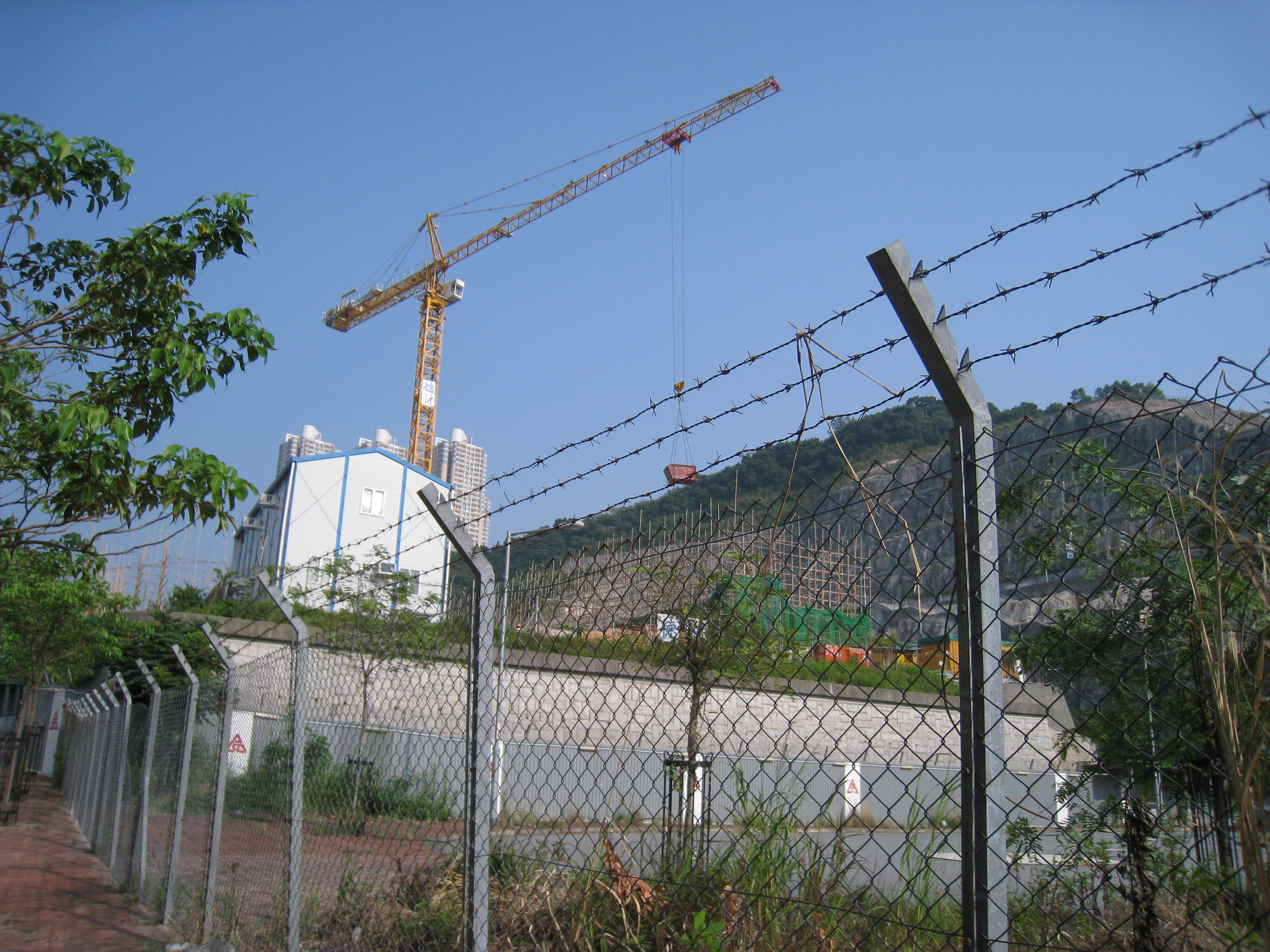
Construction site of the redevelopment of St. Joseph's Home for the Aged in 2009.

1. Provision of entertainment centers, homes and commercial areas:
  The project includes the construction of a 7-storey shopping mall, restaurants, and cinemas. There will be 5 residential buildings possibly as high as 55 floors, providing 2,210 private flats. 53,000 square meters will be allocated for commercial uses.
2. Conservation of heritage:
  The three historic buildings on the original site will be conserved. It will be retained by a huge glass shelter and incorporated into the shopping mall. Access will be available to the public in the near future, providing the public information about the heritage of Hong Kong.
3. Community facilities:
  There was ample discussion on the community facilities to be provided by the redevelopment. Tentatively, there are plans for building a kindergarten; a new home for the aged with a capacity of 200 people; and connecting constructions between shopping malls and Choi Hung MTR station, thereby providing safe passageways for pedestrians.
4. Traffic conditions:
  The redevelopment project also aims at easing traffic along Clear Water Bay Road through the widening the roads and improving transportation infrastructure.

== Ngau Chi Wan District Development in 2000 ==
In 2000, the Chief Executive of Hong Kong approved the blue print on Ngau Chi Wan District Redevelopment.

As indicated in the district planning project, 35.9 hectares were allocated to "Residential (Type A)" uses, such as public housing, the Home Ownership Scheme, and for private housing. Fung Shing Street and Wing Ting Road, covering 2.4 hectares, were planned for "Residential (Type B)" uses, namely private housing.

=== General land use of the site ===
The site on which St. Joseph's Home for the Aged is built is 2.17 hectares in size. It was planned to be a "Multiple Development District" as 1.13 hectares of the site is reserved for "Village-styled development".

== Image gallery ==
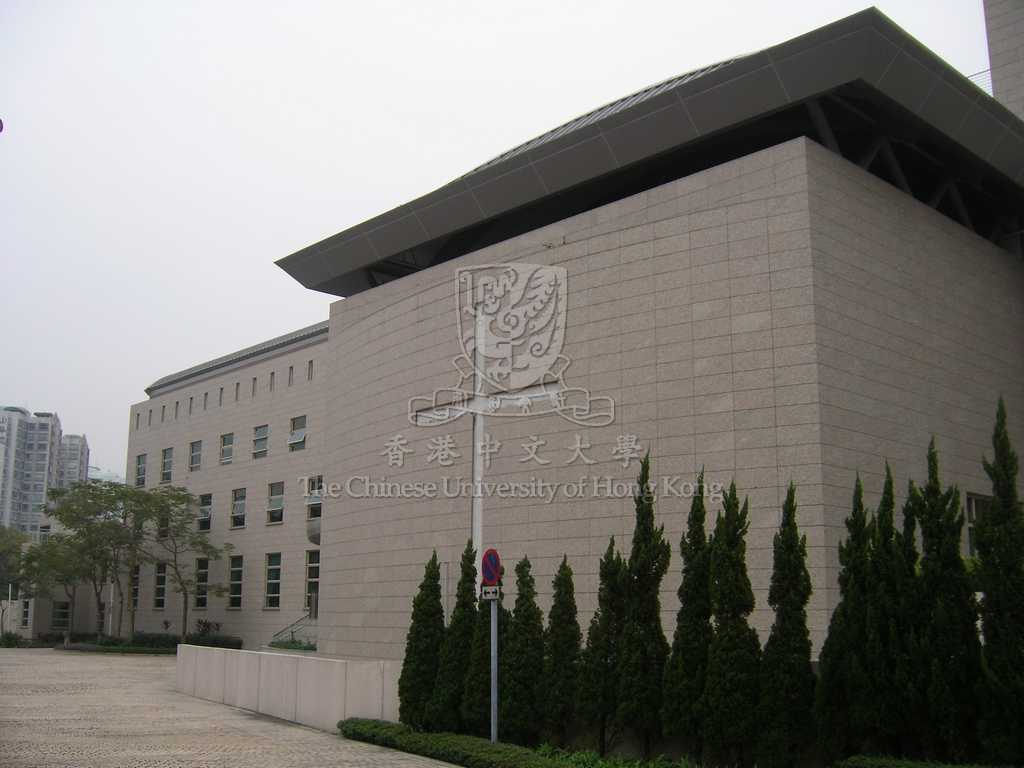
Facilities in Sheung Shui

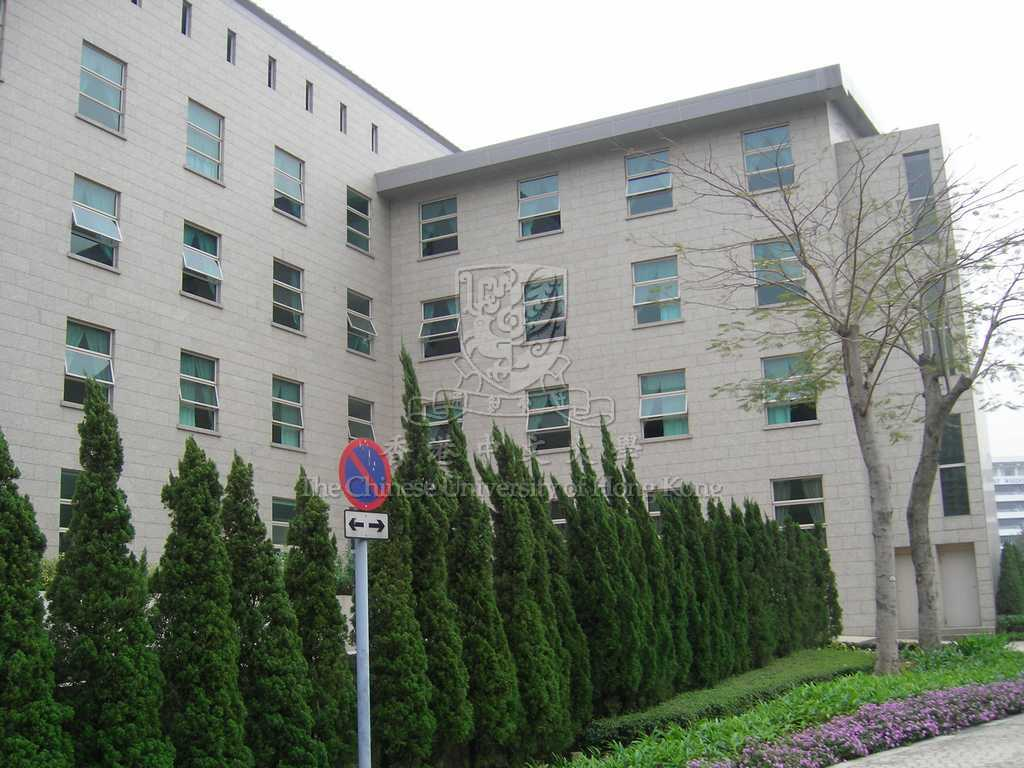
Facilities in Sheung Shui

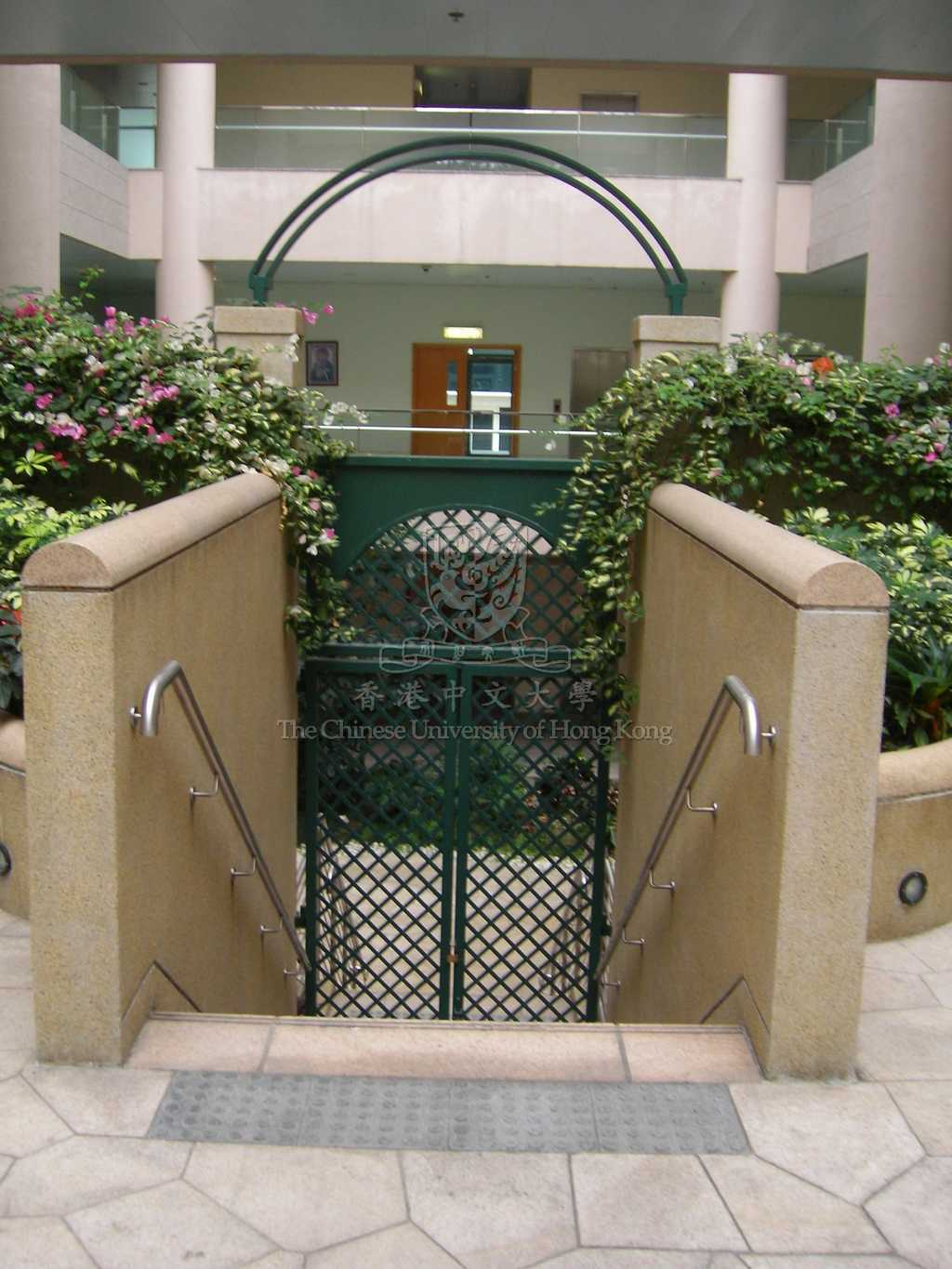
Facilities in Sheung Shui

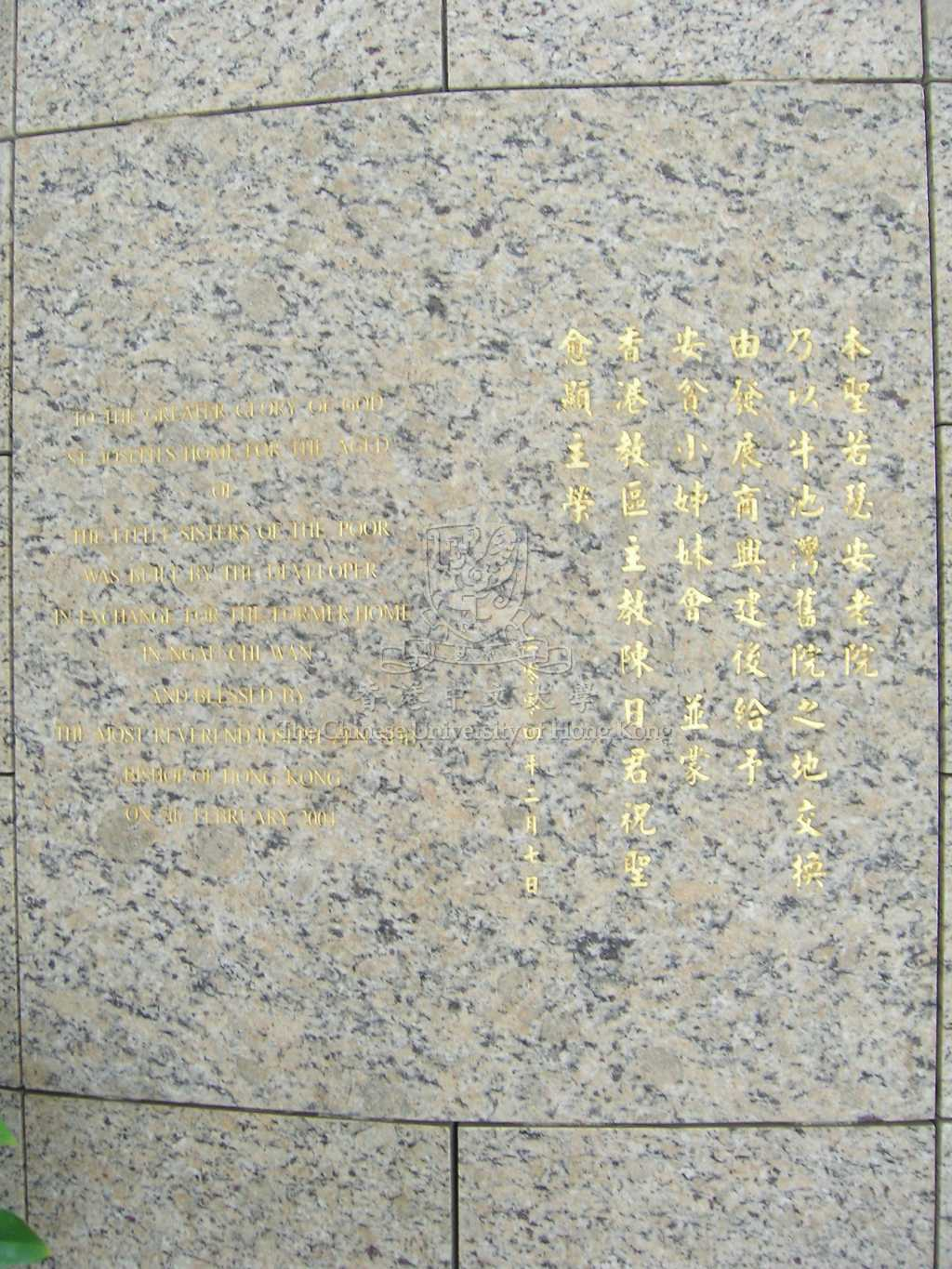
Facilities in Sheung Shui
