= Mong Tseng Wai =

Walled village in Yuen Long District, New Territories, Hong Kong

Coordinates: 22.477555°N 114.003347°E

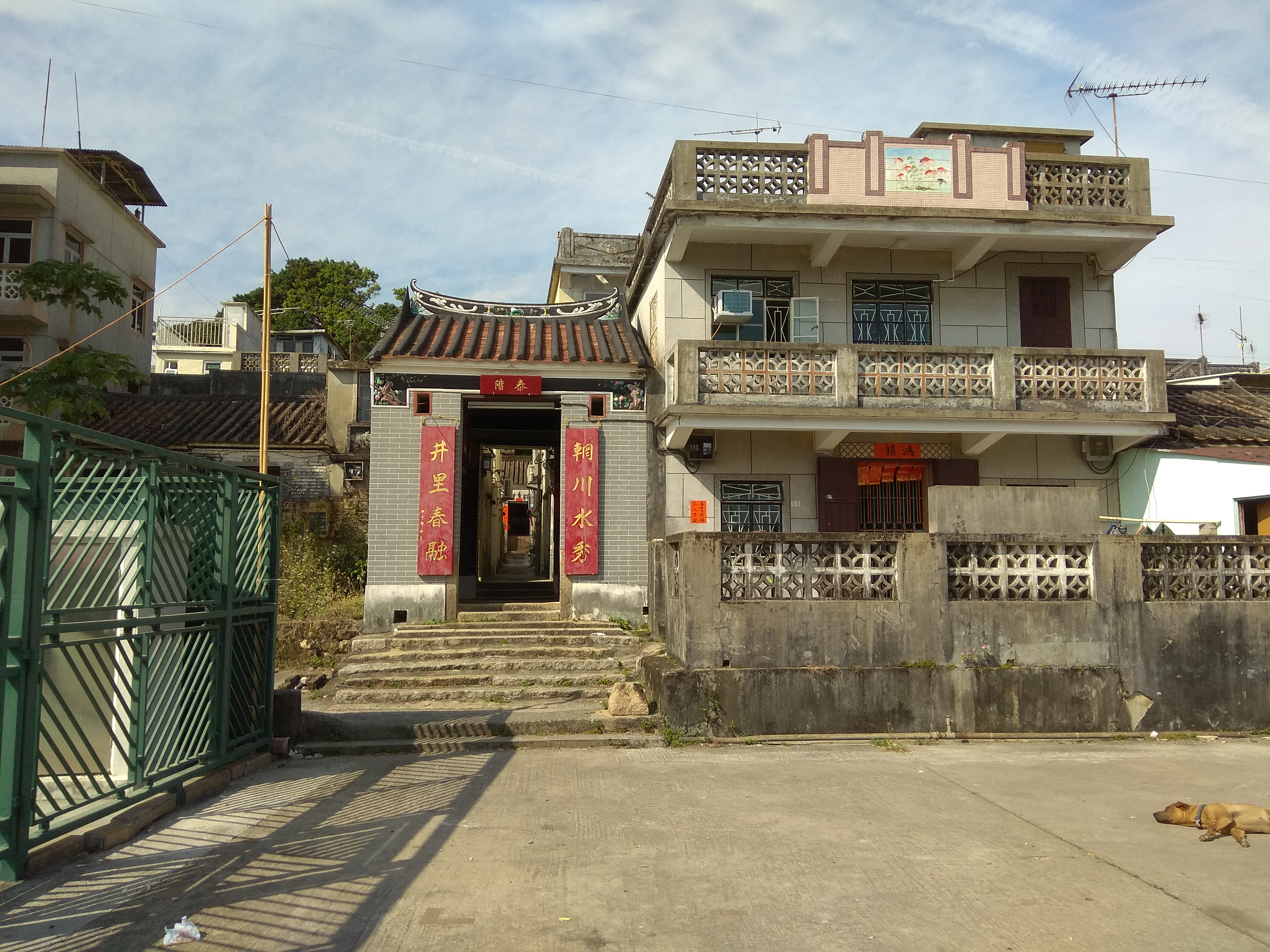
Entrance gate of Mong Tseng Wai.

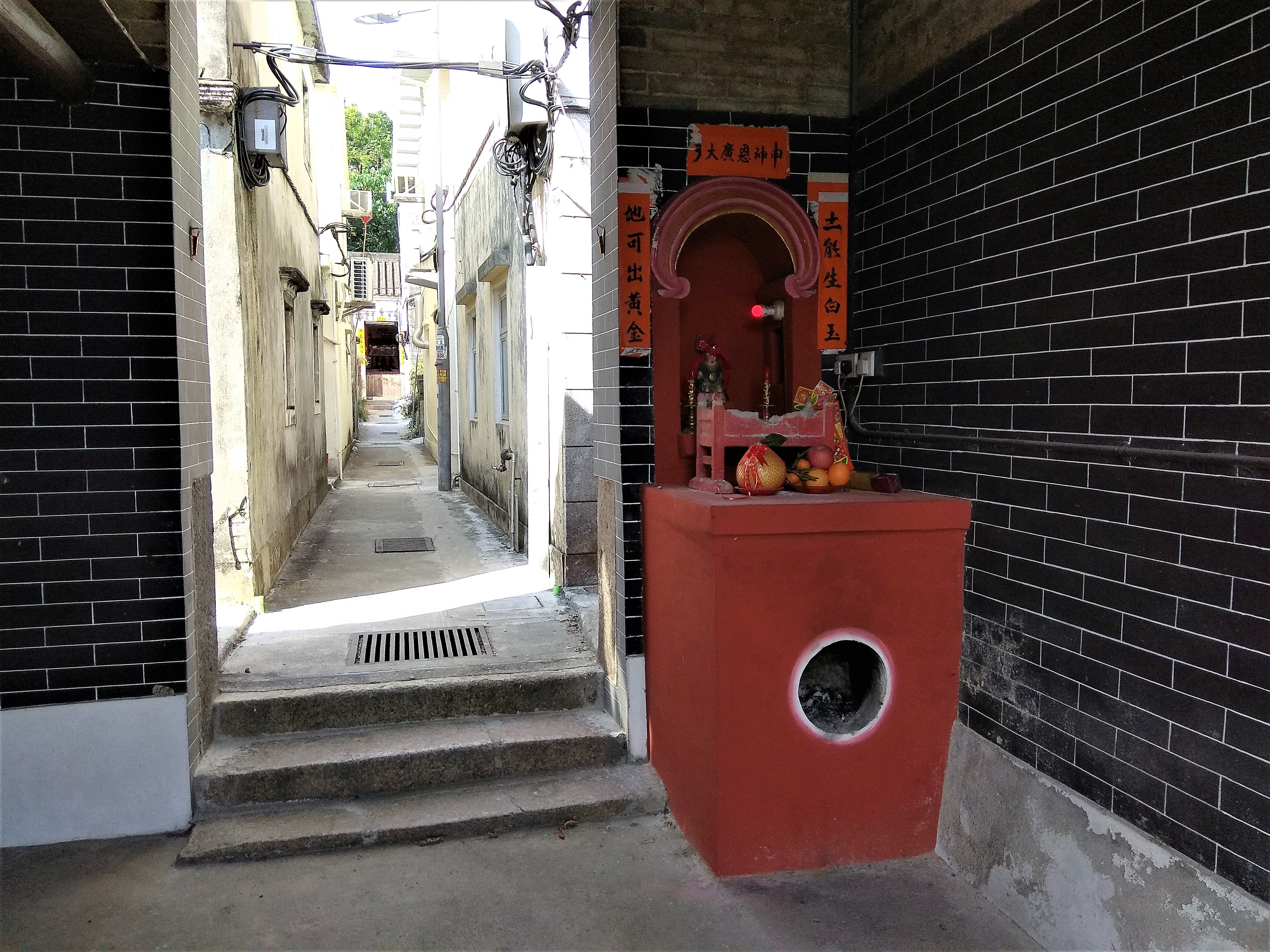
Central axis of Mong Tseng Wai viewed from the entrance gate.

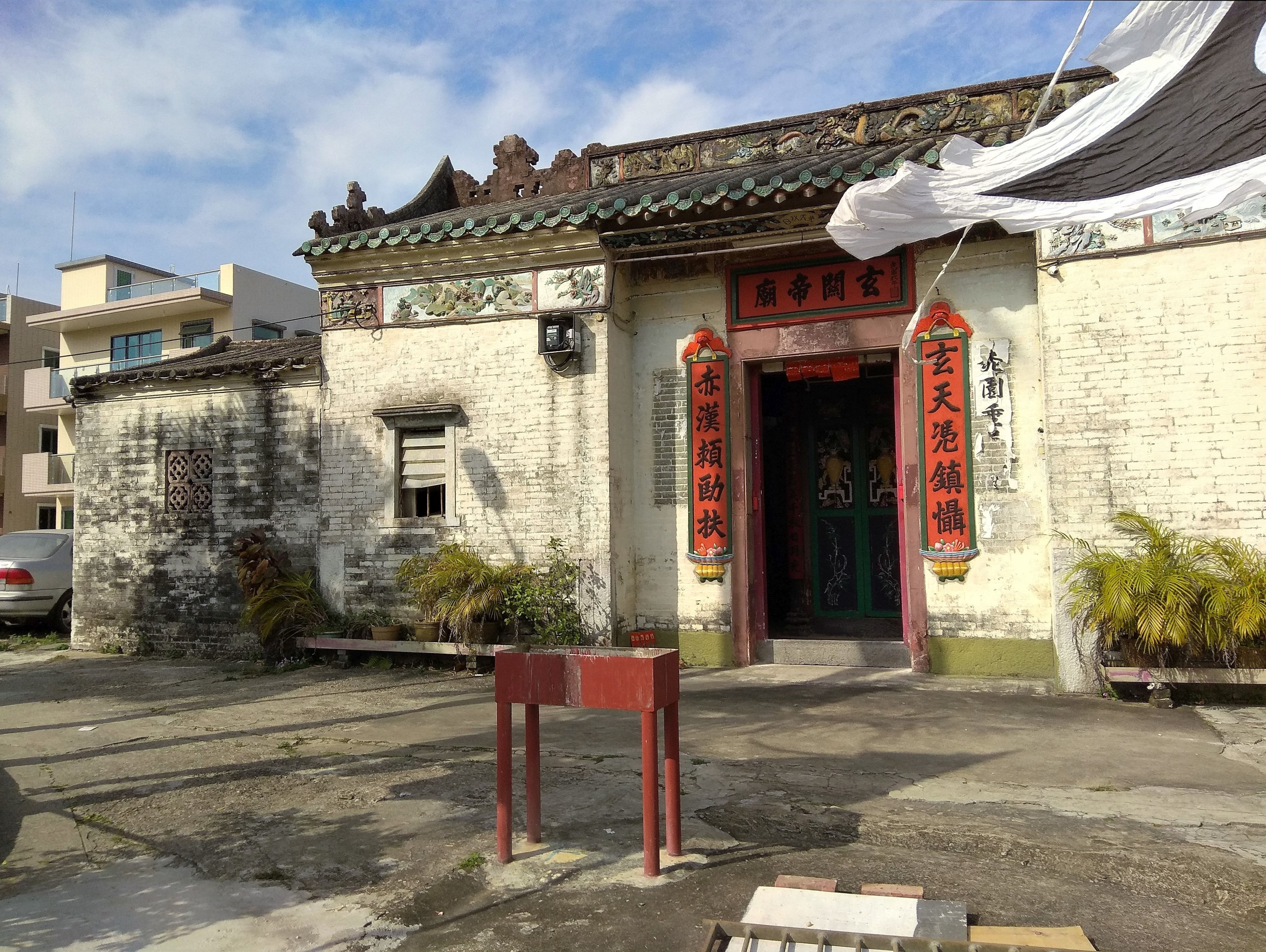
Yuen Kwan Tai Temple in Mong Tseng Wai.

Mong Tseng Wai (Chinese: 輞井圍) is a walled village in Yuen Long District, New Territories, Hong Kong.

== Administration ==
Mong Tseng Wai is a recognized village under the New Territories Small House Policy. For electoral purposes, Mong Tseng Wai is part of the Ping Shan North constituency.

== History ==
In 2001, a house structure with underground water system dated to Song dynasty were discovered in Mong Tseng Wai by the Hong Kong Archaeological Society. It was the only Song dynasty village site in Hong Kong.

Mong Tseng Wai was founded by the Tang Clan of Kam Tin during the Ming dynasty. Mong Tseng Wai was historically probably allied to Ha Tsuen in an oath-sworn alliance, although it was not part of the Ha Tsuen Heung (廈村鄉).

== Features ==
- The entrance gate of the walled village was listed as a Grade III historic building.
- The nearby Yuen Kwan Tai Temple was listed as a Grade I historic building.
- The Tsim Bei Tsui Egretry Site of Special Scientific Interest is located east of Mong Tseng Wai.

== See also ==
- Walled villages of Hong Kong
- Mong Tseng Tsuen
