= Castle Peak (Hong Kong) =

Mountain in Hong Kong

- 青山
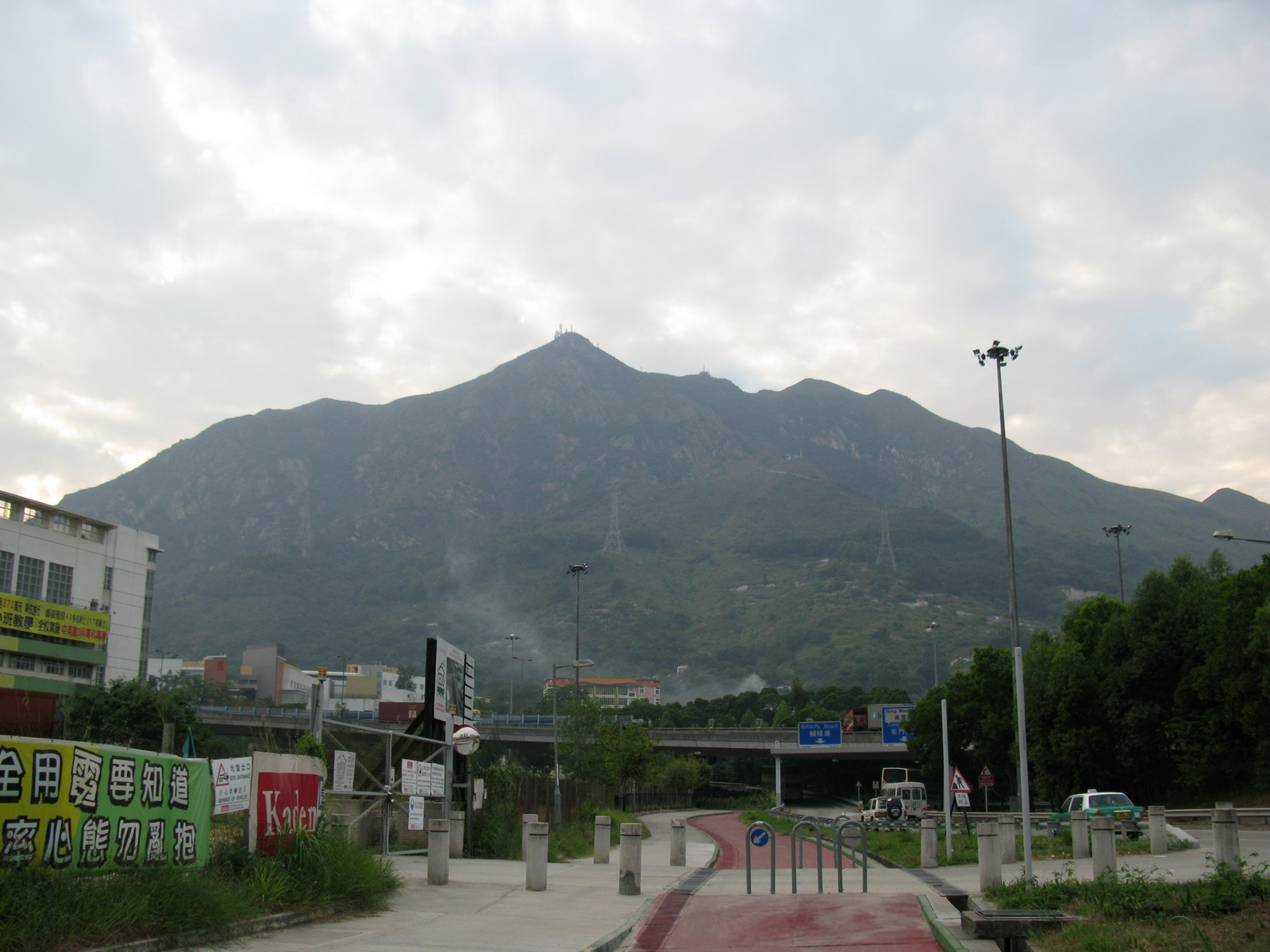
- View of Castle Peak in November 2007 (image by Baycrest)

Highest point
- Elevation: 583 m (1,913 ft); HKPD
- Coordinates: 22°23′18.35″N 113°57′11.63″E

Geography
- Location within Hong Kong
- Location: Hong Kong

Castle Peak
- Chinese: 青山
- Literal meaning: Green/Blue Hill
Transcriptions
Standard Mandarin
- Hanyu Pinyin: Qīng Shān
Hakka
- Romanization: Qing1 San1
Yue: Cantonese
- Yale Romanization: Chīng Sāan
- Jyutping: Cing1 Saan1

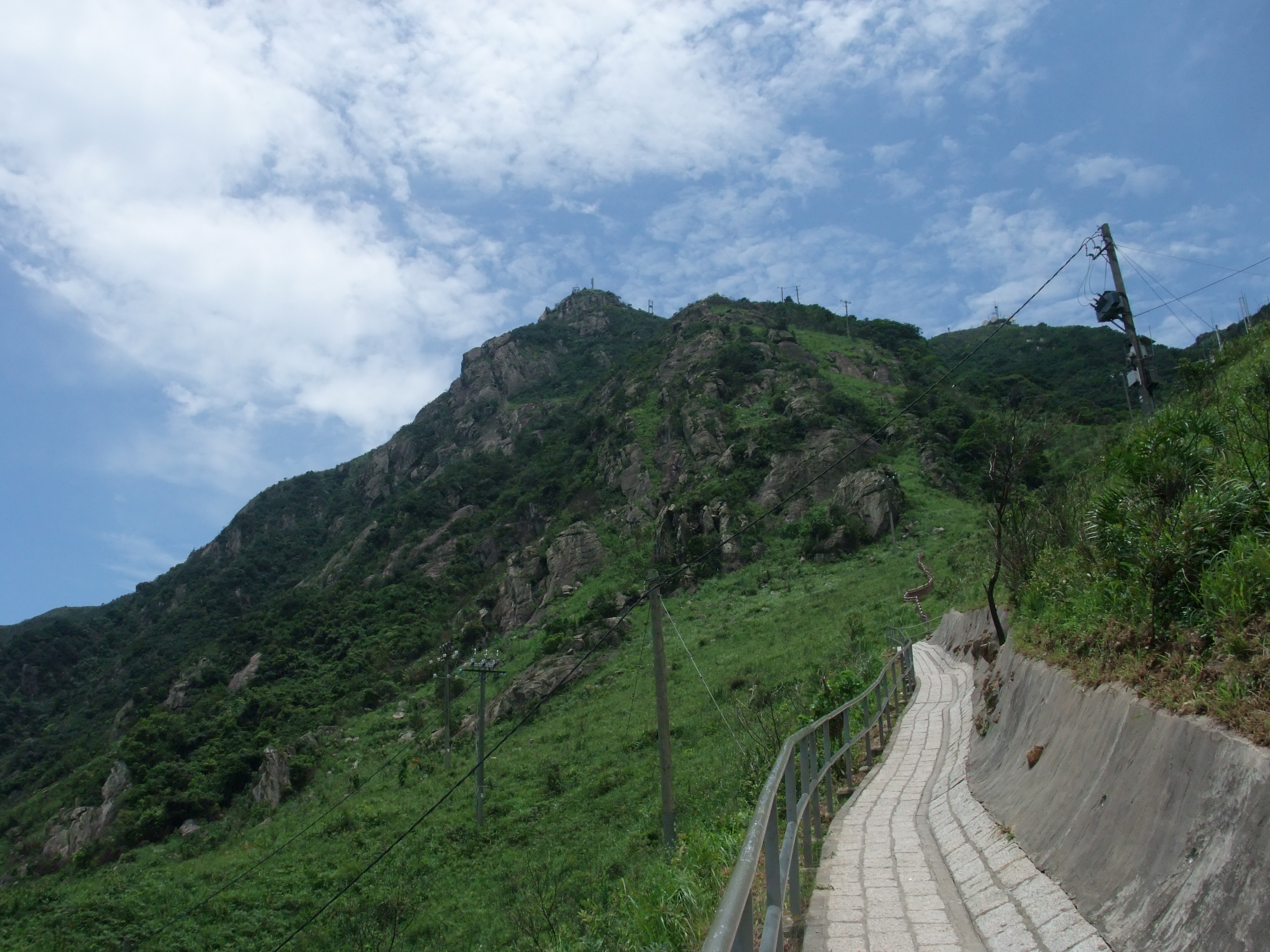
A view of Castle Peak from below on 20 July 2008 (image by Minghong)

Castle Peak (Chinese: 青山, sometimes transcribed Tsing Shan) or Pui To Shan (杯渡山) is a 583-metre (1,913-feet)-high peak in western New Territories, Hong Kong. It is also the highest granitic hill in Hong Kong.

In contrast to its Chinese name, which means green hill, Castle Peak is notorious for its severe loss of vegetation and weathering of its granite surface.

== Geography ==
The hill looks to be triangular, with two other peaks surrounding the hill in its north and south (with heights of 539 metres (1768 ft) and 517 metres (1696 ft) respectively).

The area to the west of the hill is an industrial area with two power plants owned by CLP (Castle Peak Power Station and Black Point Power Station). It is also the old name of Tuen Mun during early British rule before starting development of Tuen Mun New Town. In early proposal of the development, the new town was named Castle Peak New Town.

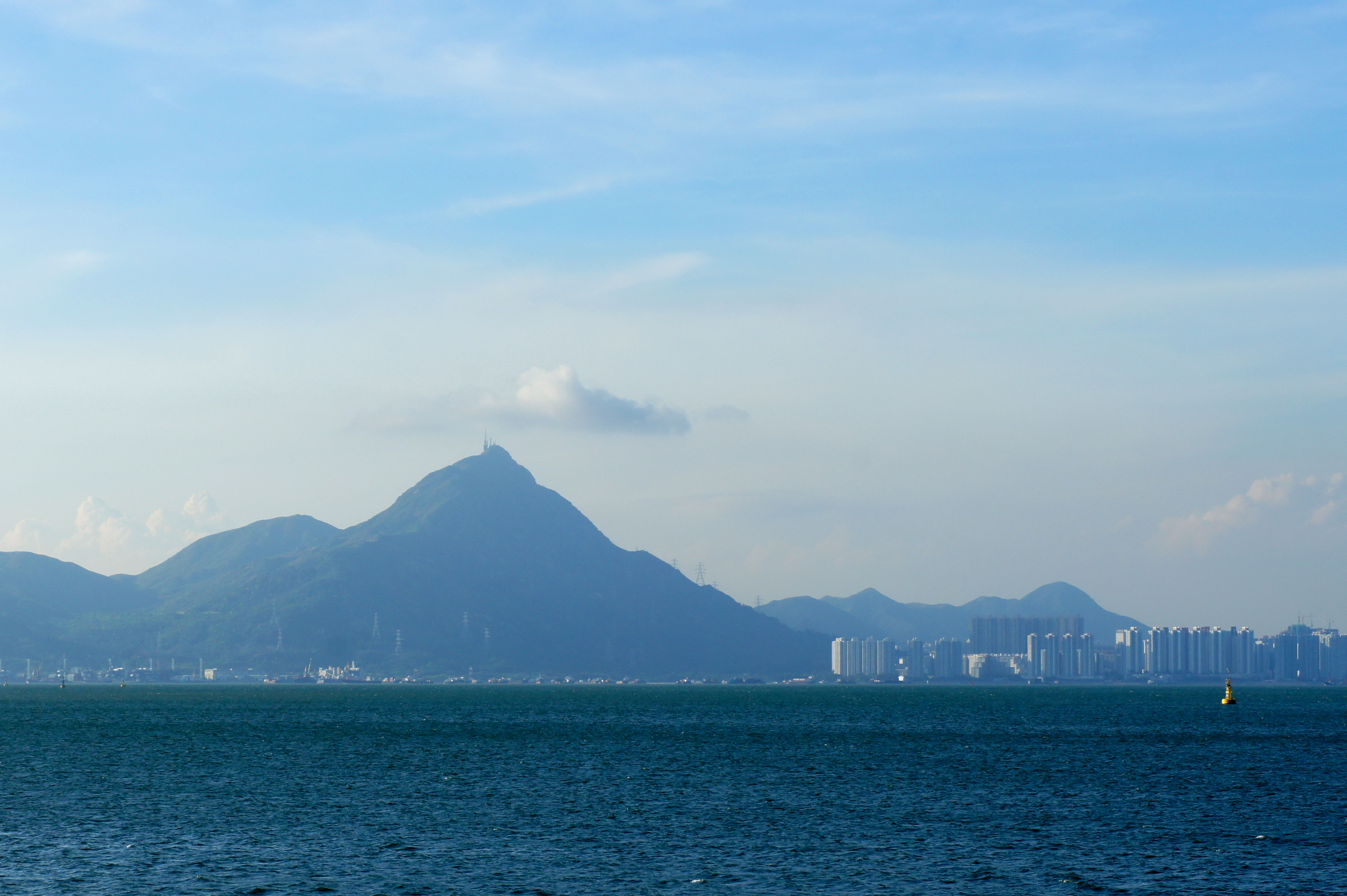
A view of Castle Peak from Tung Chung on 9 June 2011 (image by Malcolm Koo)

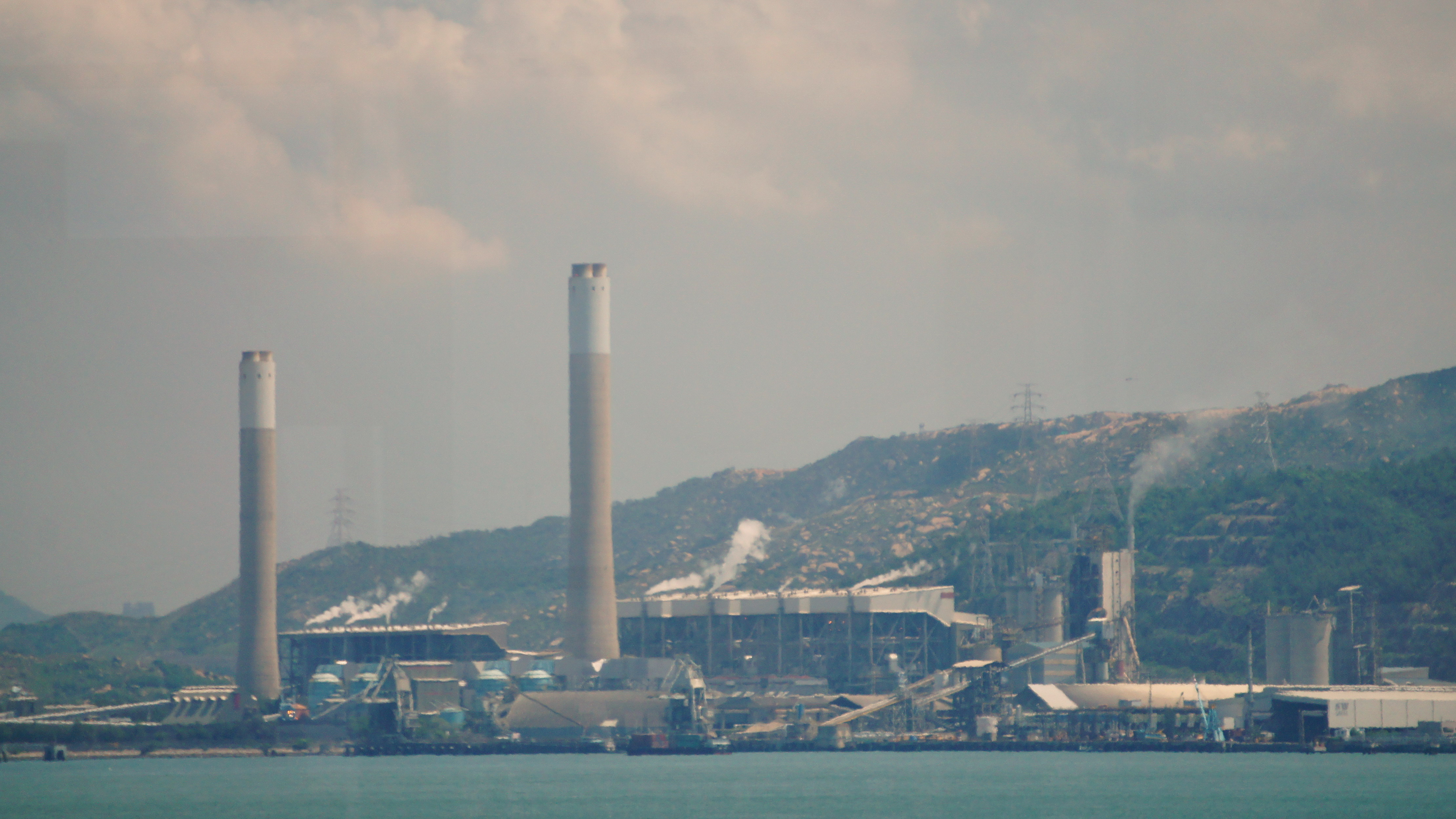
A view of the Castle Peak Power Station in Tap Shek Kok on 30 July 2013 (image by Malcolm Koo)

Castle Peak is unique in that it is among the few prominent mountains in Hong Kong which are not inside a country park.

== Formation ==
The shape of the hill is formed by wearing and erosion on the granite forming the hill. This weathering erodes granite blocks, causing disintegration of the blocks. The granite are broken into smaller pieces, where they fall and accumulate on the less steep slopes in the west of the mountain. As there are more steeper slopes on the eastern side, some of the debris would fall down there to the Tuen Mun Valley.

== Castle Peak Hinterland ==
=== Firing ===
Most areas north of the mountain and west of the mountain are commonly known as the Castle Peak Hinterland. Much of this large rocky hinterland is a designated firing range used by the People's Liberation Army and police forces in Hong Kong, and is named the "Tsing Shan Firing Range". Warnings are issued to the public before live military exercises are carried out. Sometimes the Firing Range is open to the public, but before venturing into the restricted areas, it is best to confirm the days on which the hinterland firing range is open to the public by searching for "firing range" in the Hong Kong Government press release website. The press releases concerning the firing range for any given month is typically released one week prior to the start of that month. Generally speaking, Saturdays, Sundays and Public Holidays are open days.

There are many hills that are considered sub-peaks of Castle Peak within this hinterland. Mountains Kon Shan and Por Lo Shan are frequently visited by hikers because the area's terrain has been compared to that of the Grand Canyon in the US, but on a smaller scale.

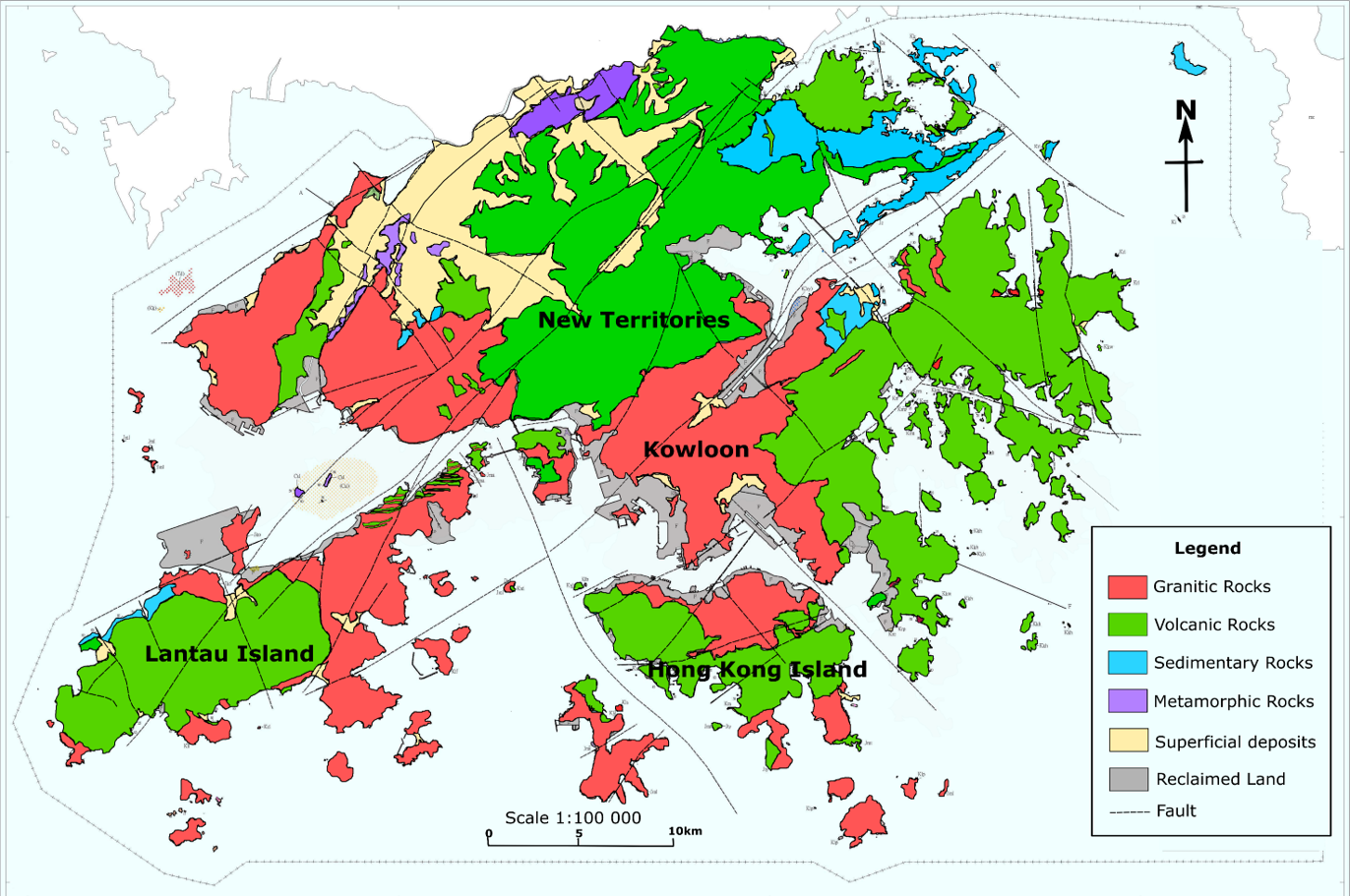
A Hong Kong Geological Map showing the distribution of rock types there. Castle Peak is in red, which shows it consists of Granitic Rocks.

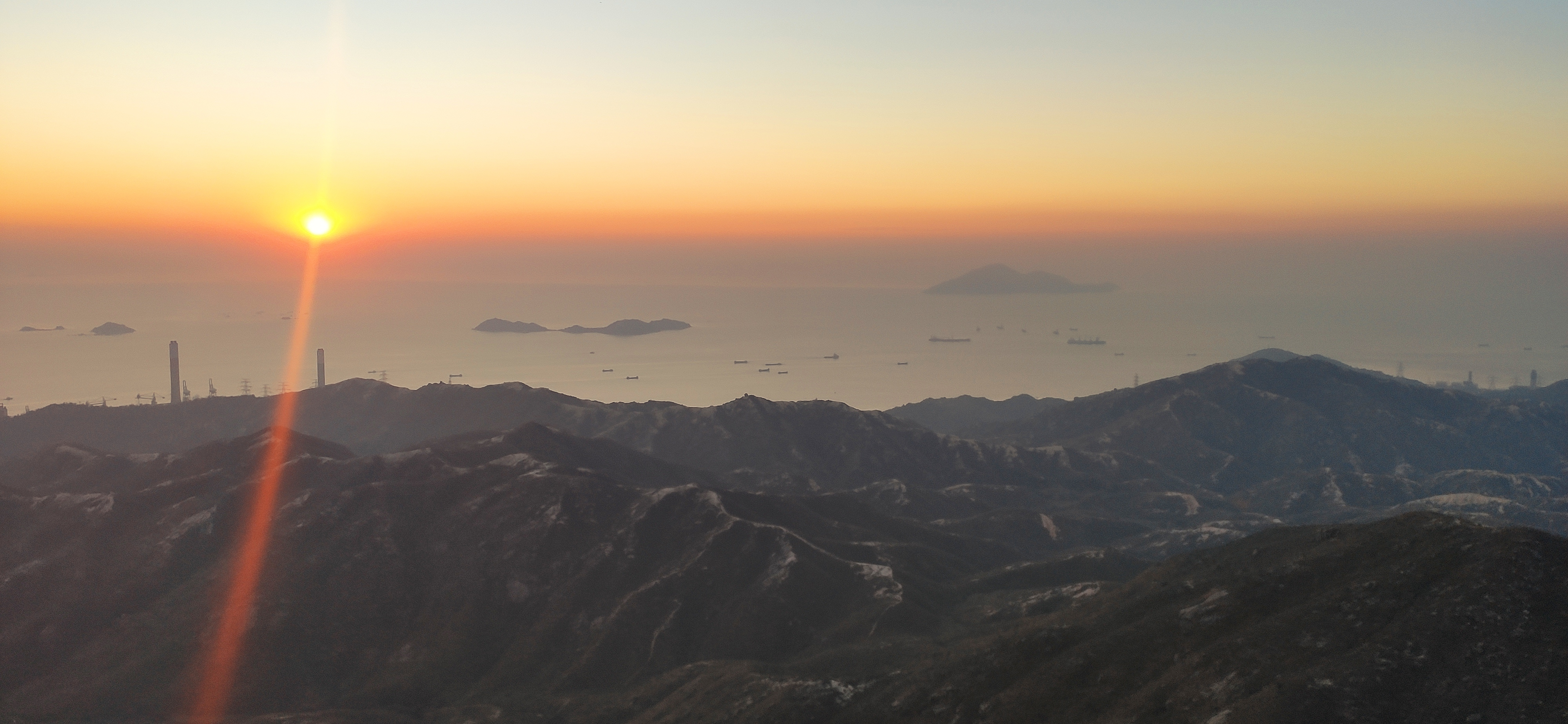
Castle Peak Hinterland viewed from the summit of Castle Peak in 30 November 2019 (image by Nhk9)

The summit of Castle Peak is not part of the Hinterland and is accessible daily, some of the routes leading up to the summit, namely from the north and west, may be closed because of military exercises on select days.

== History ==
The name Pui To Shan was associated with a Buddhist monk Pui To Sim Shi (杯渡禪師). In Cantonese, Pui means "cup", To means "water-crossing", Sim Shi means "Monk of Zen". Legend has it that the monk had travelled over water in a cup and finally reached the Castle Peak. He established a monastery on the hill, which became the present-day Tsing Shan Monastery.

Early records have indicated that the peak was an island once named Tuen Mun Island (屯門島). Its former channel with Kau Keng Shan of an important sea route in South China. Defence structures were built on both hills.

== Hiking ==
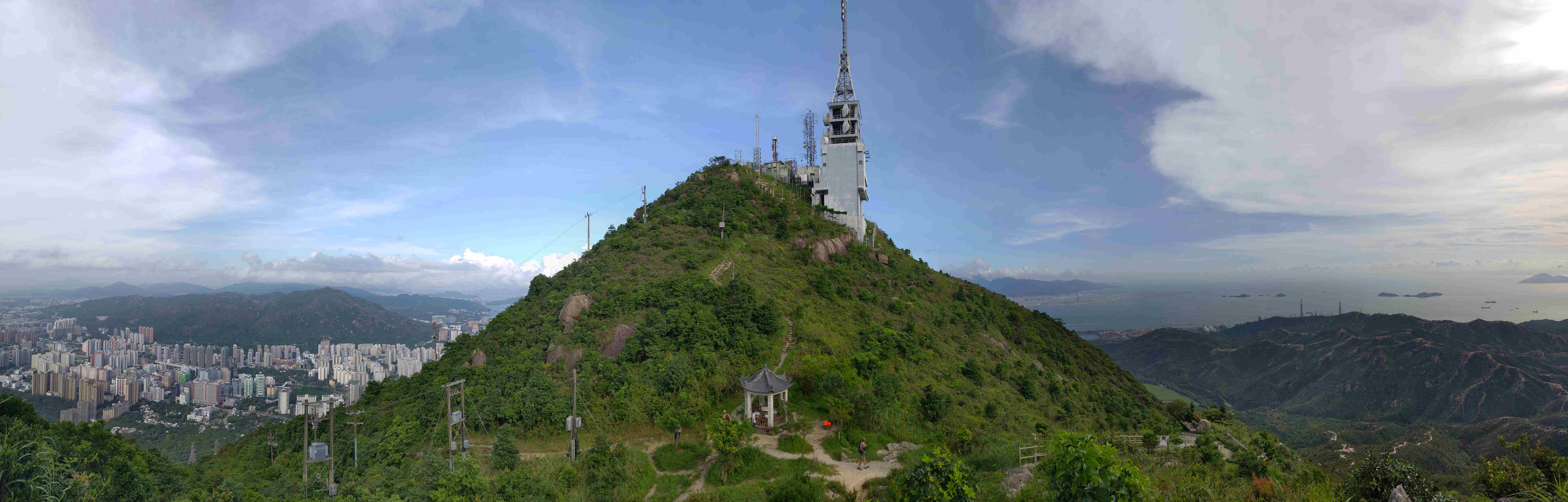
Castle peak pavilion and transmission tower

Known as one of Hong Kong's "Three Sharp Peaks", Castle Peak is a challenging hike that's mainly composed of a series of stairs all the way to its 583-meter summit. The start of the hike is on Yeung Tsing Road in Tuen Mun, right where the Tsing Shan Monastery sign is.

The safest way to hike Castle Peak is to take the stairs straight to the top and then take the same stairs back down. It is also possible to hike down into the "hinterlands" beyond, though this route is steep, slippery and tricky.

== See also ==
- Tuen Mun New Town
- Castle Peak Road
- Kau Keng Shan
- Three Sharp Peaks of Hong Kong
- List of mountains, peaks and hills in Hong Kong
