= A Symphony of Lights =

Permanent Hong Kong light and sound show

A Symphony of Lights 幻彩詠香江
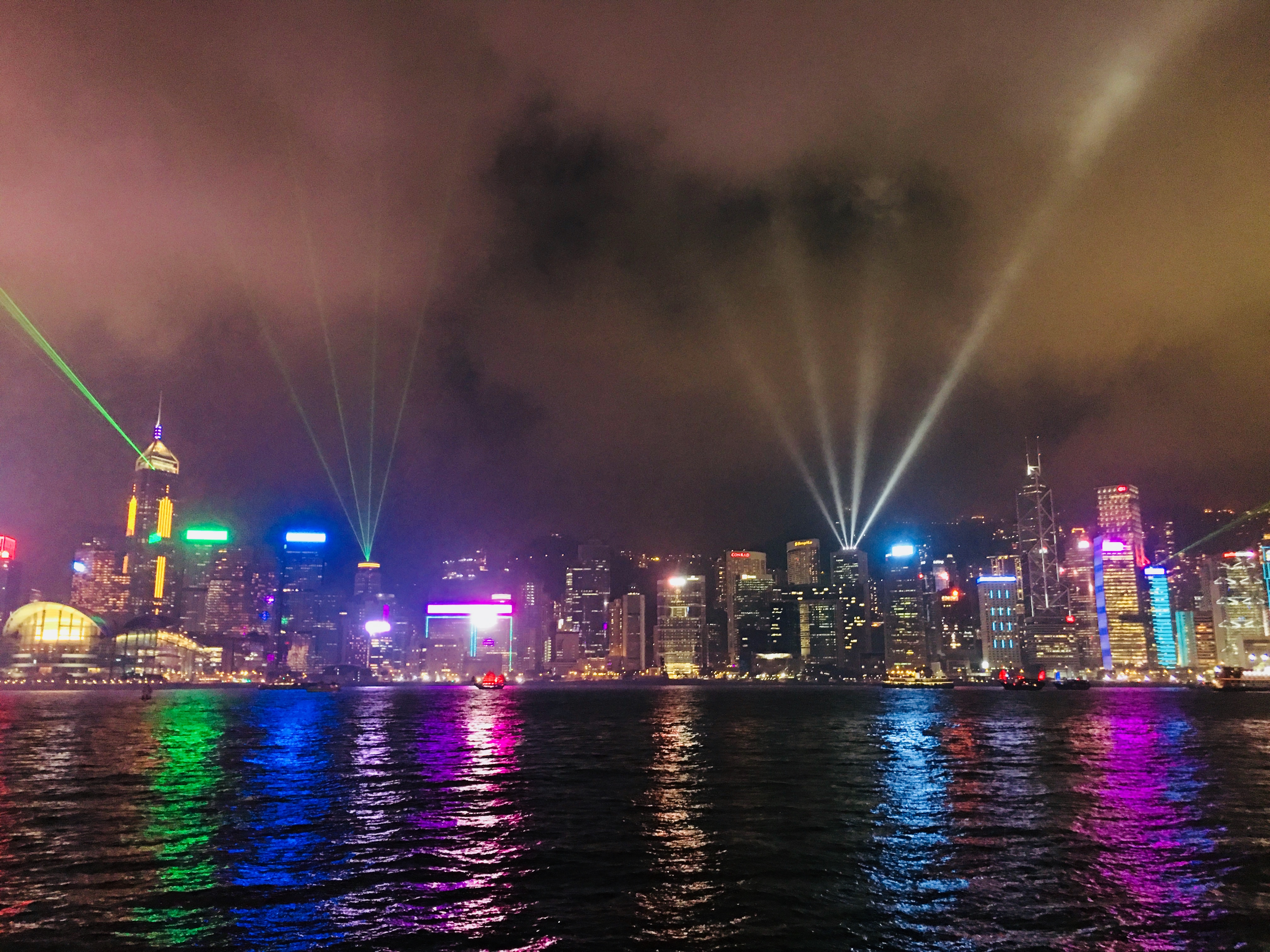
- Decorative lights and lasers from buildings
- Status: Inactive
- Genre: Light show
- Begins: 08:00 PM (HKT)
- Ends: 08:10 PM
- Frequency: Daily
- Venue: Across Victoria Harbour
- Locations: Central; Admiralty; Wan Chai; Tsim Sha Tsui; West Kowloon; Hung Hom
- Coordinates: 22°17′15.91″N 114°10′25.03″E
- Country: Hong Kong
- Years active: 2004–2026
- Inaugurated: 17 January 2004
- Organiser: Hong Kong Tourism Board
- Website: tourism.gov.hk/symphony

A Symphony of Lights
- Traditional Chinese: 幻彩詠香江
- Simplified Chinese: 幻彩咏香江
- Literal meaning: Hong Kong multicolor illusion song
Transcriptions
Standard Mandarin
- Hanyu Pinyin: Huàn Cǎi Yǒng Xiāngjiāng
- Bopomofo: ㄏㄨㄢˋ ㄘㄞˇ ㄩㄥˇ ㄒㄧㄤ ㄐㄧㄤ
Yue: Cantonese
- Jyutping: waan^{6} coi^{2} wing^{6} hoeng^{1} gong^{1}

A Symphony of Lights (Chinese: 幻彩詠香江) was a daily light and sound show across the Victoria Harbour in Hong Kong. It is the world's largest permanent light and sound show, according to Guinness World Records. As of 2017, there were 42 participating buildings in the show. A Symphony of Lights has been retired in 2026, with the final show held at 18 November, with an addition of a rooftop pyrotechnics display.

== Background ==
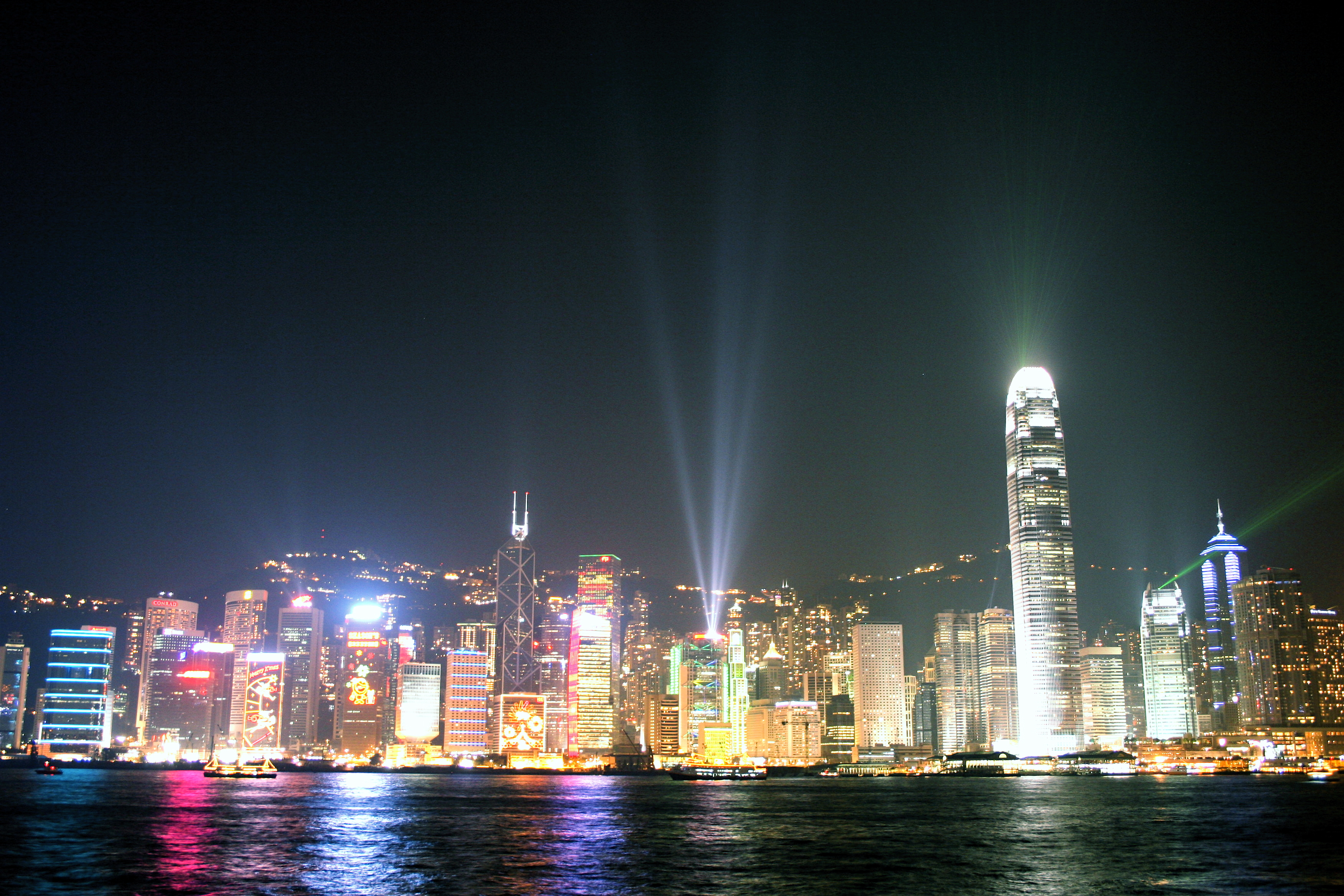
Symphony of lights in 2009

The show was organized by the Hong Kong Tourism Board and was displayed every night with good weather at 8 pm Hong Kong Time (UTC+8). An orchestration of music, decoration lights, laser light displays, and pyrotechnic fireworks, the multimedia light and sound show lasts for around 10 minutes and was conceptualized, created, and installed by LaserVision.

The best vantage points include the "Avenue of Stars" on the Tsim Sha Tsui waterfront, on the waterfront promenade outside the Golden Bauhinia Square in Wan Chai and on sightseeing ferries (i.e. Star Ferry) running across the Victoria Harbour. The Show's music and narration live at the "Avenue of Stars" and the promenade outside the Golden Bauhinia Square in Wan Chai every night. On Mondays, Wednesdays and Fridays the narration is in English, while it is in Mandarin on Tuesdays, Thursdays and Saturdays, and Cantonese on Sundays.

Special pyrotechnic fireworks were added to the show on the rooftop of participating buildings on both sides of the harbour or stages off at the Tsim Sha Tsui waterfront. They are used on special events or holidays, like Chinese New Year and Christmas.

When Tropical Cyclone Warning Signal No.3 or above or a Red or Black Rainstorm Warning Signal is issued by the Hong Kong Observatory at or after 3 pm on any given day, the show is suspended for that evening, even if the warning is subsequently rescinded prior to the 8 pm start time. The show may also be suspended in emergencies without prior notice. The show is also suspended during days of mourning and the night of Earth Hour.

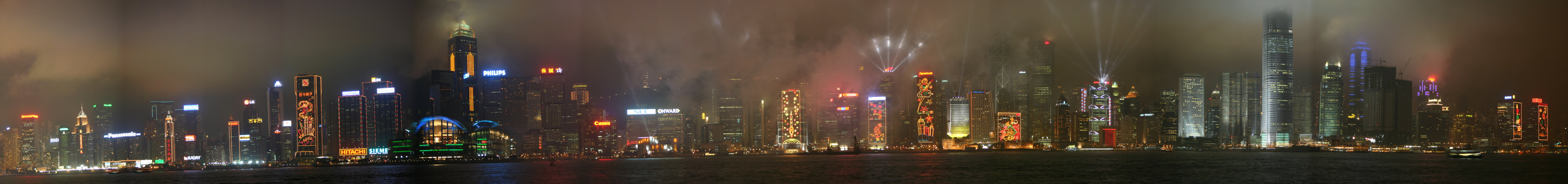
Panoramic night view of Victoria Harbour with Symphony of Lights. Many buildings in this photo also have Chinese New Year decorations on their outer walls.

=== 2017–present ===
A new version was revealed on 1 December 2017 with 40 locations involved. A central feature of the new show was "coloured searchlights, lasers, and all-new beam lights" sent out as a fan-shaped lighting effect from the sent out like a special fan-shaped lighting effect from the Central Government Offices and the Revenue Tower. Music continued to be broadcast nightly from the Tsim Sha Tsui waterfront, and the Golden Bauhinia Square.

After six months of protests heightened security concerns, in December 2019, the Hong Kong Tourism Board (HKTB) said the New Year's Eve fireworks would be cancelled for the first time in a decade, to be replaced by a Symphony of Lights multimedia show at the stroke of midnight instead. Small-scale pyrotechnics were still to be released from nearby buildings. On 31 December 2019, an "enhanced" A Symphony of Lights occurred, with the Hong Kong Convention and Exhibition Centre's facade turning into a count-down clock for the new year. The light show commenced at exactly midnight, with lighting effects synchronized with pyrotechnics.

The LED facade of the M+ museum was used as the countdown clock on 31 December 2021, which once it struck midnight, was complemented by A Symphony of Lights show and lighting effects. In March 2022, the HKTB received an 80 per cent boost in funding to promote "cross-border travel", equating to an additional HK$600 million in funding from the local government. Recurrent funds included HK$113 million to support the launch of more "mega-events," such as A Symphony of Lights laser show as part of the city's handover anniversary in July 2022. As of 2022, there are 39 participating buildings in the show, and two attractions.

On 31 December 2023, after a four-year hiatus, the New Year's Eve countdown returned to Victoria Harbour to celebrate 2024. It was reported that the New Year's Eve fireworks were the largest and most spectacular since 2019. It spanned 1,200 meters across Victoria Harbour from Central, Hong Kong to Causeway Bay. It was followed by "Shooting star" every 15 minutes beginning at 11 pm, A Symphony of Lights display (without music) together with a 12-minute musical fireworks show with color-changing seasons. The show was directed by Lu Lin, assistant director of the 2008 Summer Olympics Opening Ceremony in Beijing.

In 2025, following the fire tragedy at Wang Fuk Court, the show was suspended on 27 November and resumed at the evening of 10 December. The following year, the annual New Year Countdown Celebrations scheduled on 31 December with Fireworks was cancelled, and the celebrations took place at Central, Hong Kong. Instead, the show was replaced by A Symphony of Lights with similar pyrotechnics from the buildings rooftop at midnight (if expected).

On 10 November 2026, HKTB chairperson Peter Lam announced that the final show of A Symphony of Lights will be on 18 November. Lam said that the HKTB will unveil new light shows in 2027.

== Themes ==
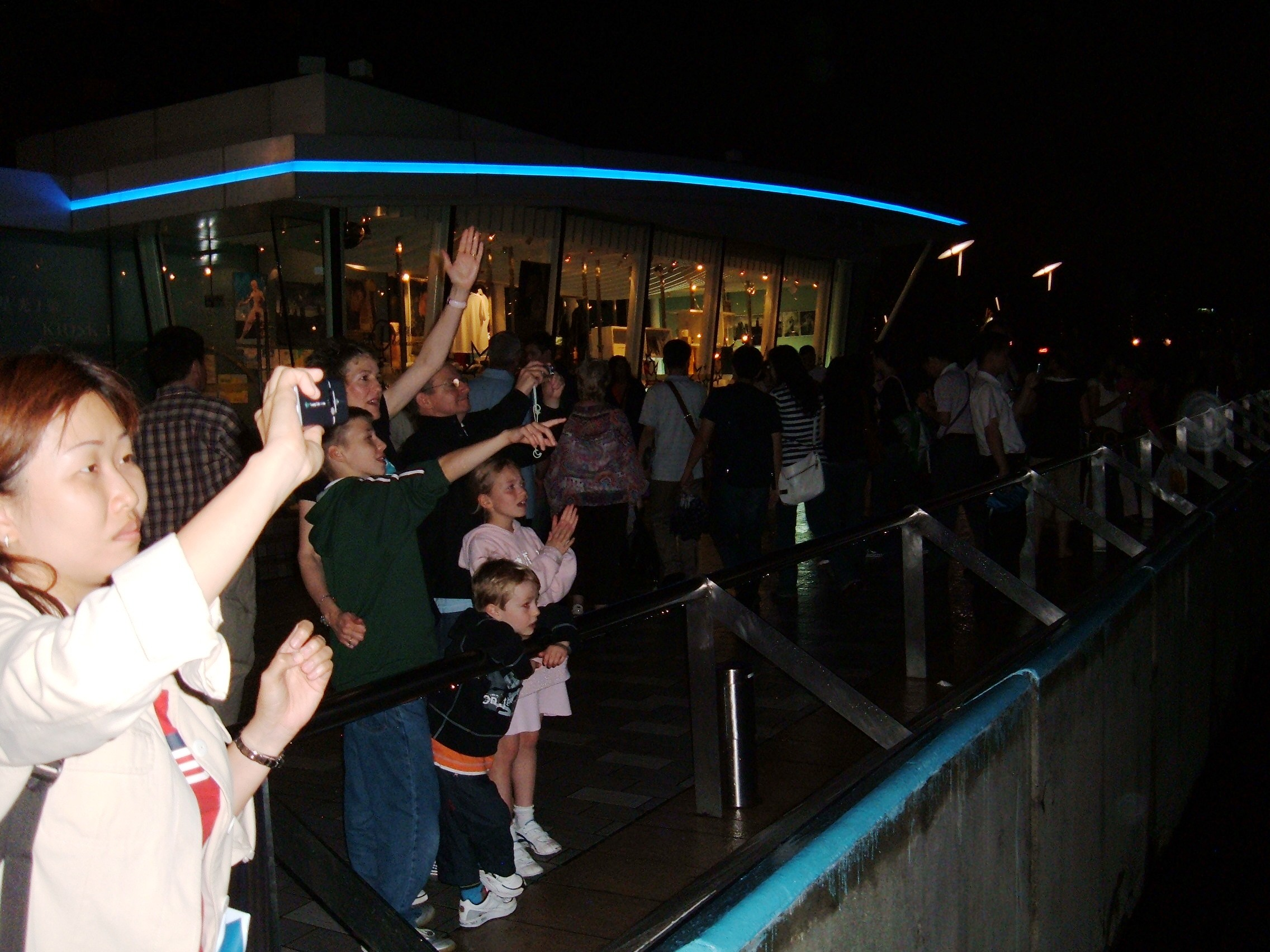
A crowd on the Tsim Sha Tsui waterfront on the Avenue of Stars viewing the show

The show comprises five major themes, taking spectators on a unique journey celebrating the energy, spirit and diversity of Hong Kong:

The first scene "Awakening" begins with flashes of laser lights that give life to a nucleus of light-energy which gradually illuminates participating buildings using an array of dancing lights and rainbow colour. This scene symbolizes the genesis and powerful growth of Hong Kong.

The second scene "Energy" is represented by the display of rising colour patterns and the sweeping of the lasers and searchlights energetically across the night sky, signifying the vibrant energy of Hong Kong.

In the third scene "Heritage", traditional lucky red and gold colours are displayed across buildings on both sides of the harbour, complemented by the introduction of music using Chinese musical instruments, symbolizing Hong Kong's colourful heritage and rich cultural traditions.

The fourth scene "Partnership" features a display of laser beams and sweeping searchlights scanning across the harbour, representing an illuminated connection with the opposite side. Beams reach out to symbolically connect the two sides of the harbour into one greater and unified partnership.

The finale "Celebration" brings out a powerful rhythmic display of swirling, kaleidoscopic patterns of lights and beams dancing lively across the harbour. The exciting final scene signifies the celebration of the close partnership between the two sides of the harbour and represents an even brighter future for Asia's world city – Hong Kong.

== Participating buildings ==
The show has been further expanded with the total number of participating buildings increased to 47 on both sides of Victoria Harbour in 2007. As of 2017, it has been reduced to 42. There are different types of lighting effects included in the show, such as laser, searchlights, LED lights, simple lighting and projection lighting, indicated with brackets below.

=== Original buildings from 2004 ===
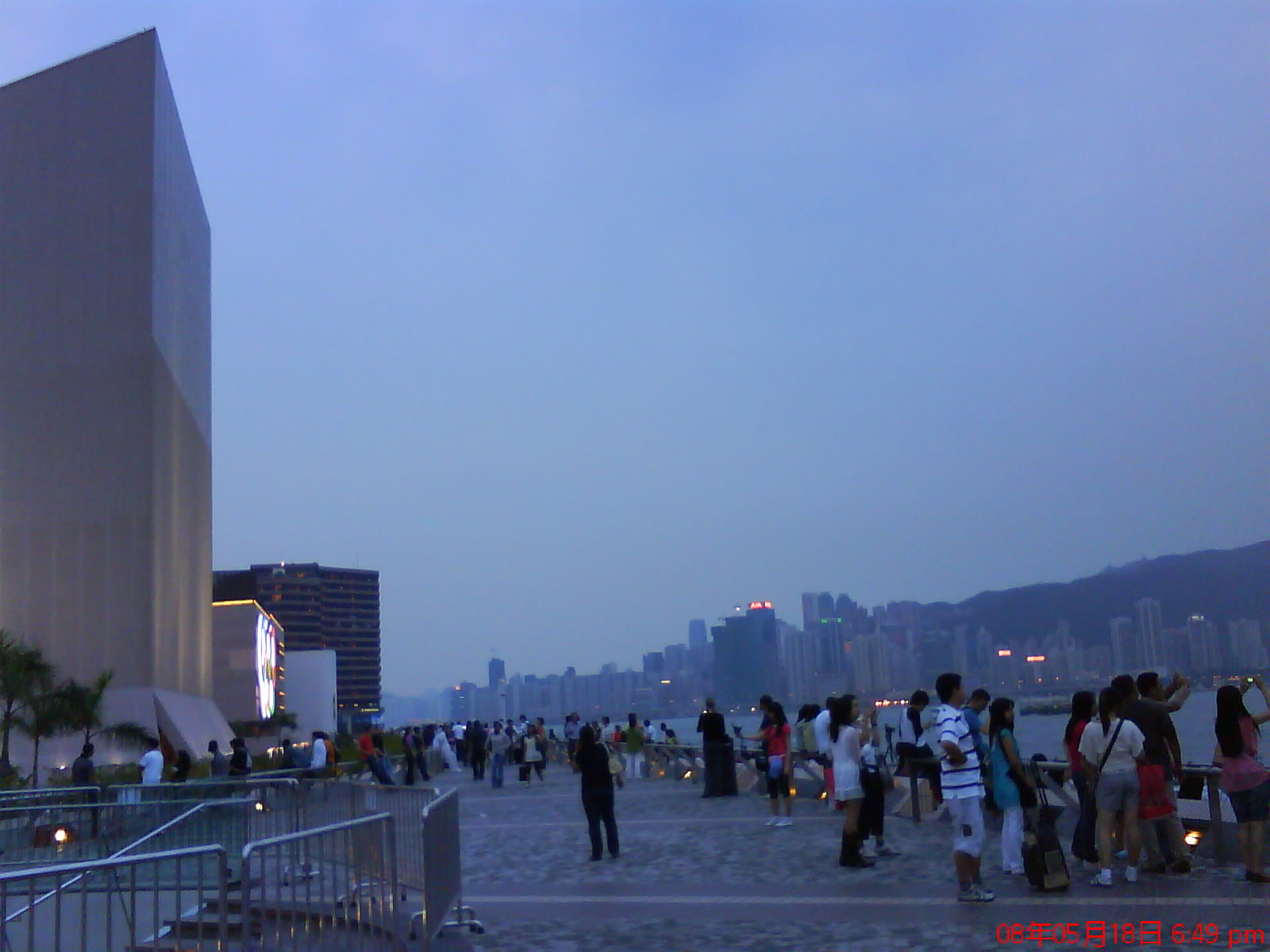
One of the vantage point of A Symphony of Lights at Tsim Sha Tsui – Hong Kong Cultural Centre. Tourists are waiting to enjoy the show

Since 17 January 2004, by the Symphony of Lights in Hong Kong Island North Shore (including Wan Chai, Admiralty and Central ) walls of 18 buildings as a performance venue, after gradually extended to 20. From east to west, including: (brackets indicates lighting devices used; ^ indicates fireworks is included in special days)

The buildings included are listed below:

1. Sun Hung Kai Centre^ (from 17 January 2004) [laser/searchlights]
2. Central Plaza, Hong Kong ^ (from 17 January 2004) [laser]
3. Hong Kong Convention and Exhibition Centre (from 17 January 2004) [LED lights]
4. Hopewell Centre^ (from December 2004) [LED lights/laser]
5. Harcourt House (Hong Kong)^ (from 17 January 2004) [LED lights]
6. The Hong Kong Academy for Performing Arts (from 17 January 2004) [searchlights/projection lighting/LED lights]
7. MassMutual Tower (from 17 January 2004) [LED lights]
8. CITIC Tower^ (from 1 May 2005) [LED lights]
9. Queensway Government Offices^ (from 17 January 2004) [searchlights]
10. The Chinese People's Liberation Army Forces Hong Kong Building (from 17 January 2004) [searchlights/projection lighting]
11. Bank of China Tower (from 17 January 2004) [LED lights/searchlights]
12. Cheung Kong Center^ (from 17 January 2004) [Optical Fiber]
13. HSBC Main Building^ (from 17 January 2004) [LED lights/searchlights]
14. Hong Kong City Hall (from 17 January 2004) [LED lights]
15. Jardine House^ (from 17 January 2004) [searchlights/projection lighting]
16. One Exchange Square (from 17 January 2004) [searchlights/projection lighting]
17. Two Exchange Square (from 17 January 2004) [searchlights/projection lighting]
18. Two International Finance Centre^ (from 17 January 2004) [laser]
19. One International Finance Centre (from 17 January 2004) [laser]
20. The Center (from 17 January 2004) [LED lights]

=== The second phase in 2005 ===
Since 23 December 2005, Symphony of Lights extended to the Kowloon peninsula (including the Tsim Sha Tsui and Hung Hom). There was a building added in Hong Kong Island:

1. AIA Central (from 23 December 2005) [LED lights]

There were 12 buildings added in Kowloon Peninsula in 2005, from west to east including:

1. Star House (from 23 December 2005) [projection lighting]
2. Hong Kong Cultural Centre^ (from 23 December 2005) [searchlights/projection lighting]
3. One Peking^ (from 23 December 2005) [searchlights]
4. Hong Kong Museum of Art^ (from 23 December 2005) [LED lights/searchlights/projection lighting]
5. The Peninsula Hong Kong (from 23 December 2005) [simple lighting ]
6. Avenue of Stars (from 23 December 2005) [searchlights/LED lights]
7. Hotel Panorama^ (from 23 December 2005) [projection lighting]
8. New World Centre^ (from 23 December 2005) [searchlights](Under redevelopment)
9. Tsim Sha Tsui Centre (from 23 December 2005) [LED lights/searchlights]
10. Empire Centre^ (from 23 December 2005) [LED lights/searchlights]
11. InterContinental Grand Stanford Hong Kong (from 23 December 2005) [simple lighting]
12. Hong Kong Coliseum (from 23 December 2005) [LED lights/searchlights/projection]

=== Since 2007 ===
There are two building added in Hong Kong Island, from east to west include:

1. Bank of America Tower (from 1 May 2007) [LED lights]
2. Standard Chartered Bank Building (from 1 May 2007) [LED lights]

There are nine (official will Gateway Tower 5 building combined) building was added in Kowloon Peninsula, from west to east include:

1. The Gateway – Harbour City (from 1 May 2007) [LED lights/searchlights]
2. Ocean Terminal – Harbour City (from 26 June 2007) [projection lighting]
3. Langham Place (from 26 June 2007) [LED lights/searchlights]
4. 26 Nathan Road^ (from 1 May 2007) [LED lights]
5. K11 (from 26 June 2007) [laser]
6. Harbourview Horizon All-Suite Hotel (from 26 June 2007) [LED lights]
7. Harbourfront Horizon All-Suite Hotel (from 26 June 2007) [LED lights]
8. EMax (from 26 June 2007) [searchlights]
9. Megabox (from 1 October 2007) [LED lights/searchlights]

=== Since 2012 ===
There was a building added in Kowloon in 2012:

1. International Commerce Centre (from 1 May 2012) [LED lights/laser]

There was a building added in Hong Kong Island in 2014:

1. CCB Tower (from first 2014) [LED lights/laser]

There was a building added in Kowloon in 2014:

1. Kai Tak Cruise Terminal (from late 2014) [Searchlights]

== A Symphony of Lights New Year Countdown ==
=== 2007 ===
To celebrate the arrival of the year 2008, on New Year's Eve of 2007, pyrotechnics were added to the show on the rooftops of participating buildings on both sides of the harbour.

Moreover, for the last 20 seconds before entering the year of 2008 (23:59:40), Two International Finance Centre started firing pyrotechnic fireworks from the outer walls, which face the Victoria Harbour, and counting down. For the first 2 minutes of the year 2008, (24:00:00), 18 of the participating buildings of both sides of the harbour had a themed pyrotechnic show, along with Two International Finance Centre, to celebrate the arrival of the new year. Reuters Earth TV broadcast the show live to the whole world on that night.

=== 2008 ===
Thousands of spectators gathered along both sides of Victoria Harbour for Hong Kong's 2009 New Year Countdown celebrations. Before entering the new year, there was a 60-second countdown by LED lights with pyrotechnic effects launched on facades of the two International Finance Centre towers.

=== 2009 ===
Hong Kong welcomed 2009 with a 4-minute pyrotechnical show on 10 landmark buildings on Hong Kong island. The show was orchestrated with a special theme song written and produced by Hong Kong musician Peter Kam to illuminate Victoria Harbour, to signify a bright and hopeful New Year for Hong Kong and the world.

A similar display was also launched before entering the year 2010 (23:59:00), followed by fireworks with an installation set on the facade of Two International Finance Centre.

=== 2010 ===
Special countdown activities were held before entering the year of 2011 (at 23:59:00).

== Lights Out Hong Kong ==
Lights Out Hong Kong is a campaign in Hong Kong to protest against the city's light pollution. Organisers of the campaign urged people in Hong Kong to switch off their lights for 3 minutes at 8 pm on 8 August 2006 as a statement of protest. However, chief executive Donald Tsang refused to support the campaign with a delay of the nightly light show. In a reply to the request made to delay the light show, Donald Tsang said that the campaign could "give adverse publicity to Hong Kong as an international metropolis and a major tourist attraction."

== See also ==
- List of tallest buildings in Hong Kong
- spectra (installation)
