= Tianjin Kerry Centre =

Residential complex in Tianjin, China

Tianjin Kerry Centre Tower 1

General information
- Status: Completed
- Type: Residential
- Location: Tianjin, China
- Opening: 2014

Height
- Roof: 705 ft (215 m)

Technical details
- Floor count: 59

Design and construction
- Architects: Skidmore, Owings & Merrill

Tianjin Kerry Centre Tower 2

General information
- Status: Completed
- Type: Residential
- Location: Tianjin, China
- Opening: 2014

Height
- Roof: 705 ft (215 m)

Technical details
- Floor count: 59

Design and construction
- Architects: Skidmore, Owings & Merrill

Tianjin Kerry Centre Tower 3

General information
- Status: Completed
- Type: Residential
- Location: Tianjin, China
- Opening: 2014

Height
- Roof: 705 ft (215 m)

Technical details
- Floor count: 59

Design and construction
- Architects: Skidmore, Owings & Merrill

Tianjin Kerry Centre is a residential complex home to three skyscrapers, Tianjian Kerry Centre Towers 1-3. The complex was designed by Skidmore, Owings & Merrill, and construction was completed in 2014 after beginning in 2009.

Kerry Centre was developed by Kerry Properties.

== See also ==
- Skyscraper design and construction
- List of tallest buildings in China
