= Enterprise Square Five =

Coordinates: 22.31987°N 114.20852°E

MegaBox
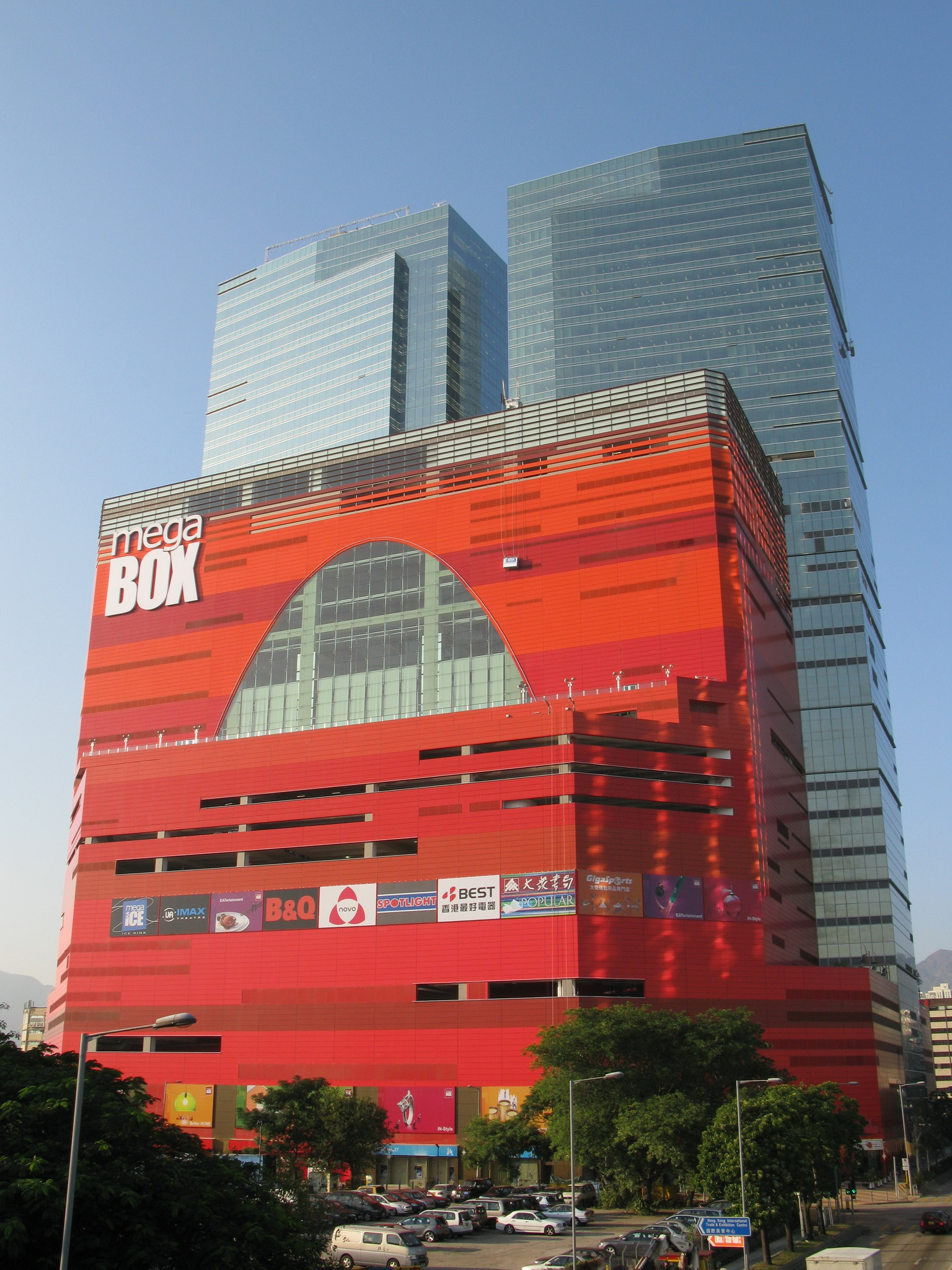
- Enterprise Square Five and MegaBox shopping mall
- Location: Kowloon Bay, Hong Kong
- Opened: June 2007; 19 years ago
- Developer: Kerry Properties
- Manager: MegaBox Management Services Ltd.
- Owner: Kerry Properties
- Floor area: sqft
- Floors: 19
- Website: www.megabox.com.hk

Enterprise Square Five (Traditional Chinese: 企業廣場五期) is a shopping mall and office building complex in Kowloon Bay, Hong Kong. It was developed by Kerry Properties. It opened in June 2007.

The property comprises the MegaBox shopping mall and two office buildings. It is the largest single property among the Enterprise Square properties, occupying 1,600,000 square feet (150,000 m^{2}) and costing HK$2 billion to build. Hang Seng Bank is the biggest tenant that rent the entire Block 2.

== MegaBox ==
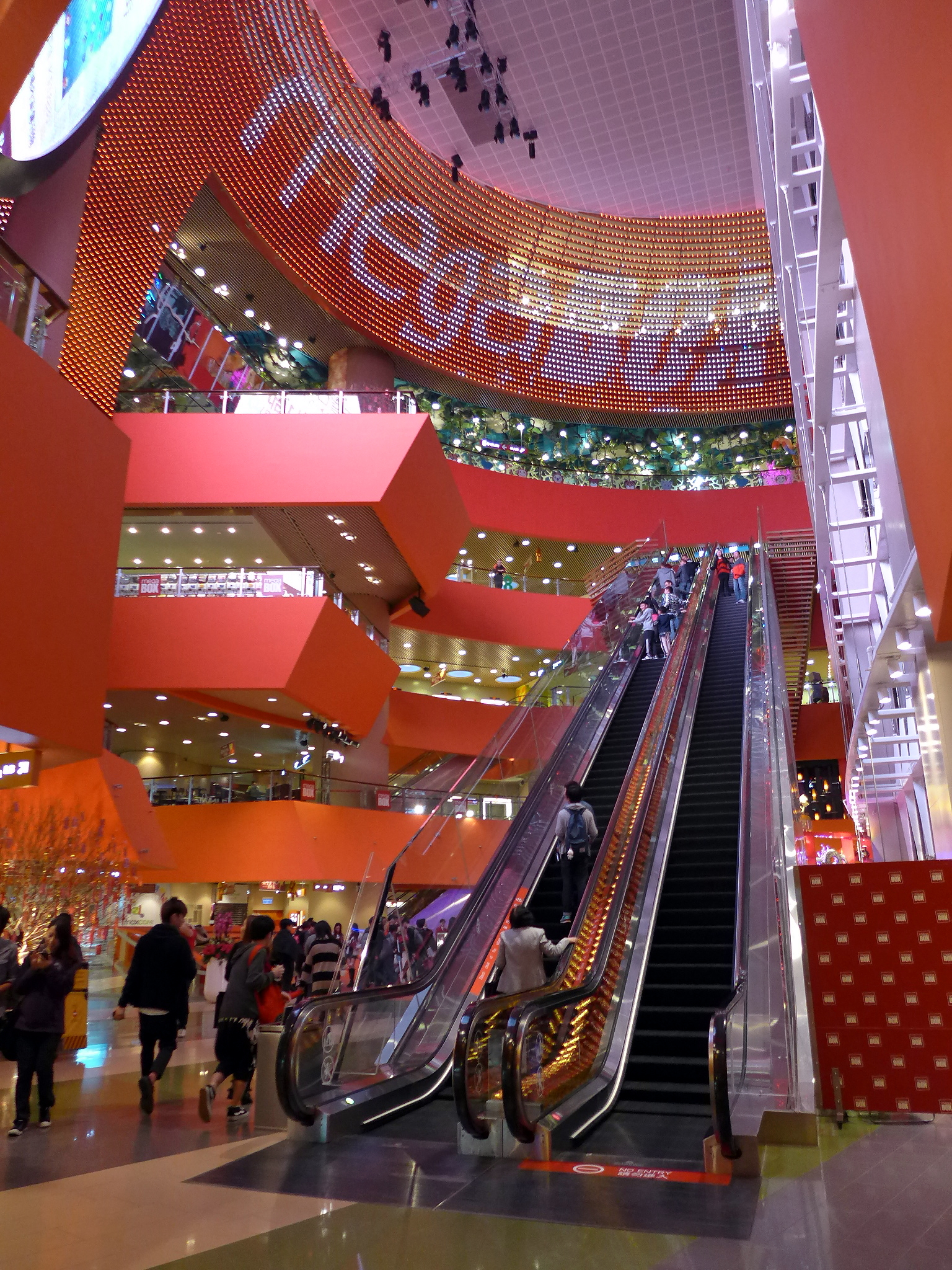
Interior of MegaBox

MegaBox occupies 1,100,000 square feet (100,000 m^{2}) and has 19 floors.

== See also ==
- List of tallest buildings in Hong Kong
