= Megabox =

Megabox may refer to:

- MegaBox (shopping mall), a shopping mall in Kowloon Bay, Hong Kong
- Megabox (cinema chain), a chain of movie theatres in South Korea
- Megabox, a music hosting service of the website Megaupload (now called Mega)
