= Harcourt House =

Harcourt House may refer to:

- Harcourt House, London, a former palatial residence on Cavendish Square, London
- Harcourt House, Edmonton, an art gallery in Canada
- Harcourt House (Hong Kong), a commercial building
