= MegaBox (shopping mall) =

Shopping centre in Kowloon Bay, Hong Kong

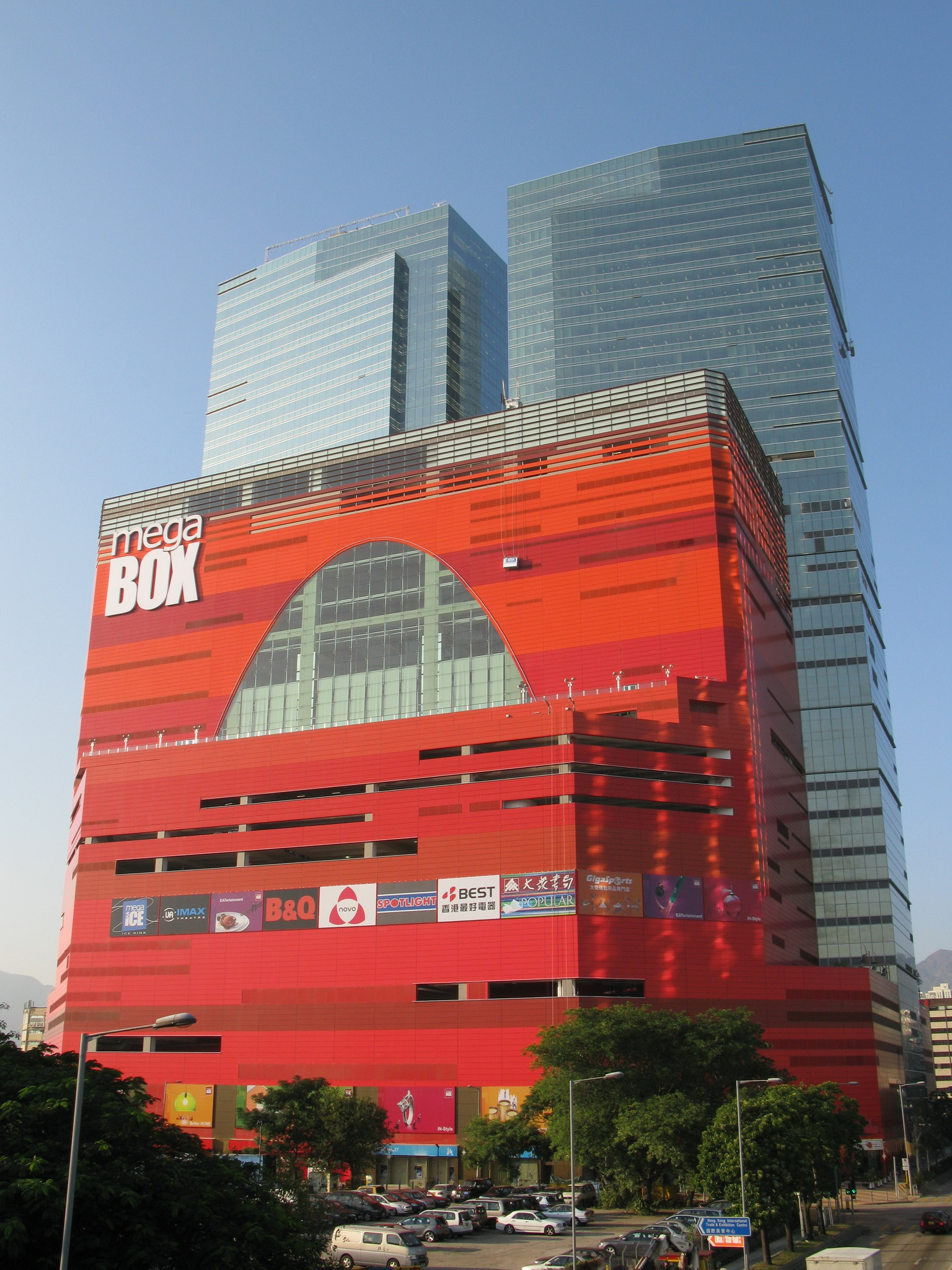
- MegaBox and the rest of Enterprise Square Five
- Location: Kowloon Bay, Hong Kong
- Coordinates: 22.319802°N 114.20815°E
- Address: 38 Wang Chiu Road
- Opened: 1 June 2007; 19 years ago
- Developer: Kerry Properties Limited
- Manager: MegaBox Management Services Ltd.
- Owner: Kerry Properties Limited
- Num. of stores: 145
- Floor area: 1,100,000 sq ft (100,000 m^{2})
- Floors: 19
- Parking: 1000
- Website: www.megabox.com.hk

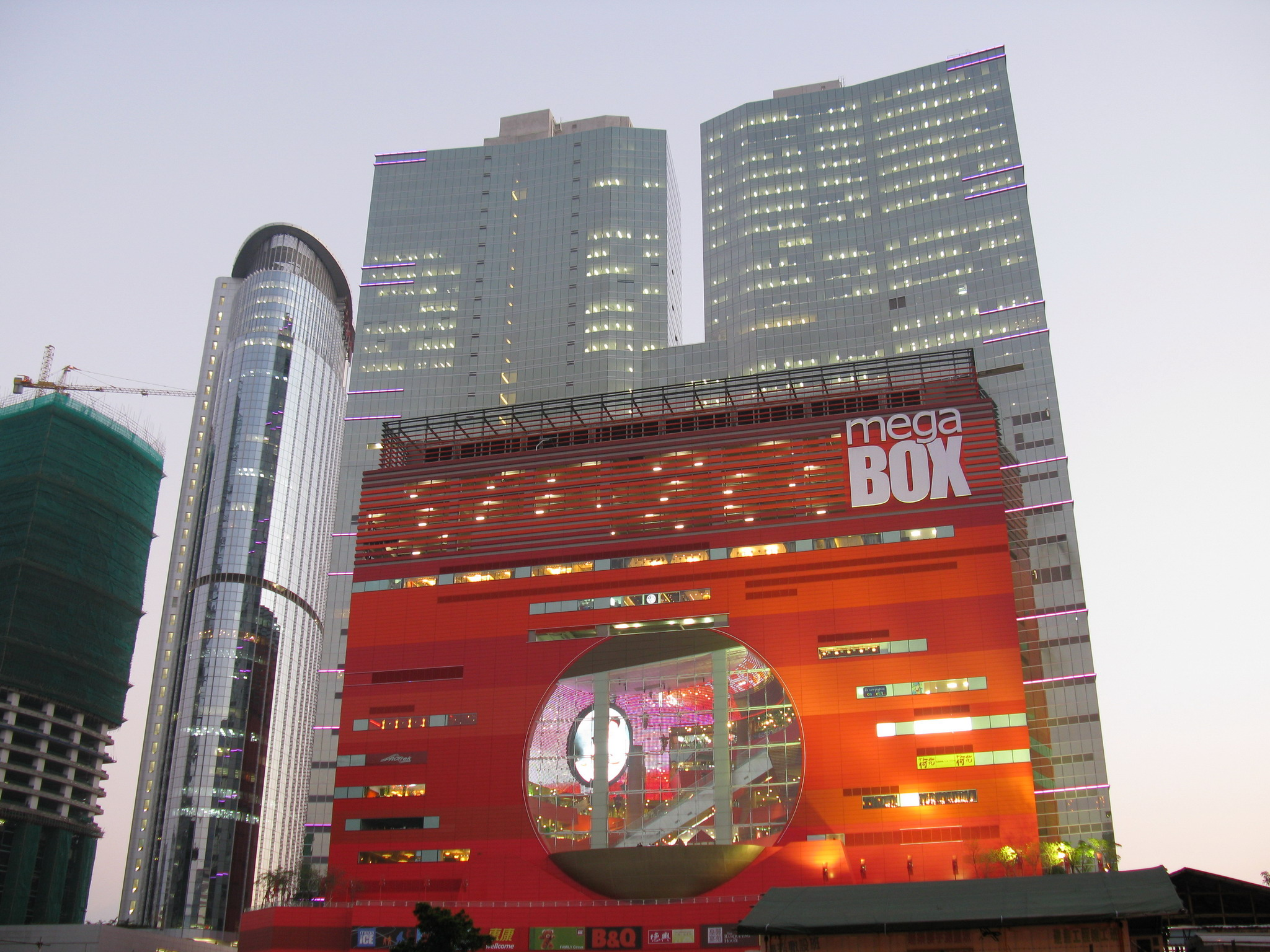
Megabox at night

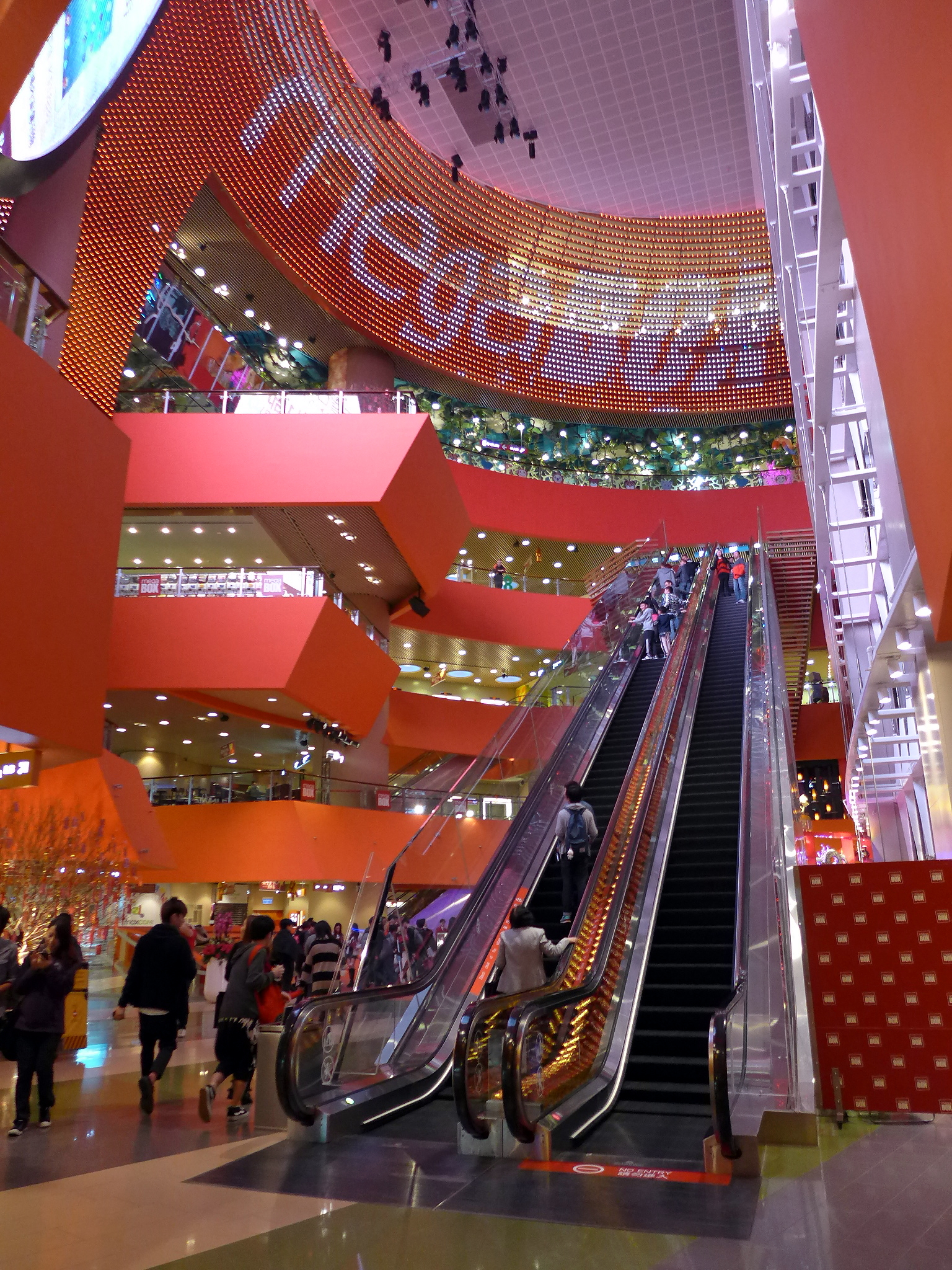
Atrium of Megabox

MegaBox is a large shopping centre in Hong Kong and part of the Enterprise Square Five shopping and office complex, located at 38 Wang Chiu Road, Kowloon Bay, Kowloon. With 19 stories and a floor area of 100,000 m^{2} (1,100,000 sq ft), MegaBox is the largest shopping centre in Eastern Kowloon.

In addition MegaBox houses an ice rink, MegaIce, which is the largest in Hong Kong at 26 metres x 57 metres. MegaBox's UA theatre is the first commercial theatre in Hong Kong to have the IMAX film display system. It also offers a 1000-space car park.

Although it is not built on top of a railway station, the mall is accessible by its free shuttle bus service, plying between the mall and MTR Kowloon Bay station with a frequent headway. Visitors using the MTR have complained of the long delay of around 15 mins from waiting for the shuttle bus to and from the mall. The mall is 15 minutes from the station on foot.

== Enterprise Square Five ==
MegaBox is part of a larger residential and office development, Enterprise Square Five, developed by Kerry Properties. The development has a gross area of 150,000 m^{2} (1,600,000 sq ft). It consists of two 15-storey office towers totalling 46,000 m^{2} (500,000 sq ft) and the 19-storey shopping mall Megabox.

== Architecture ==
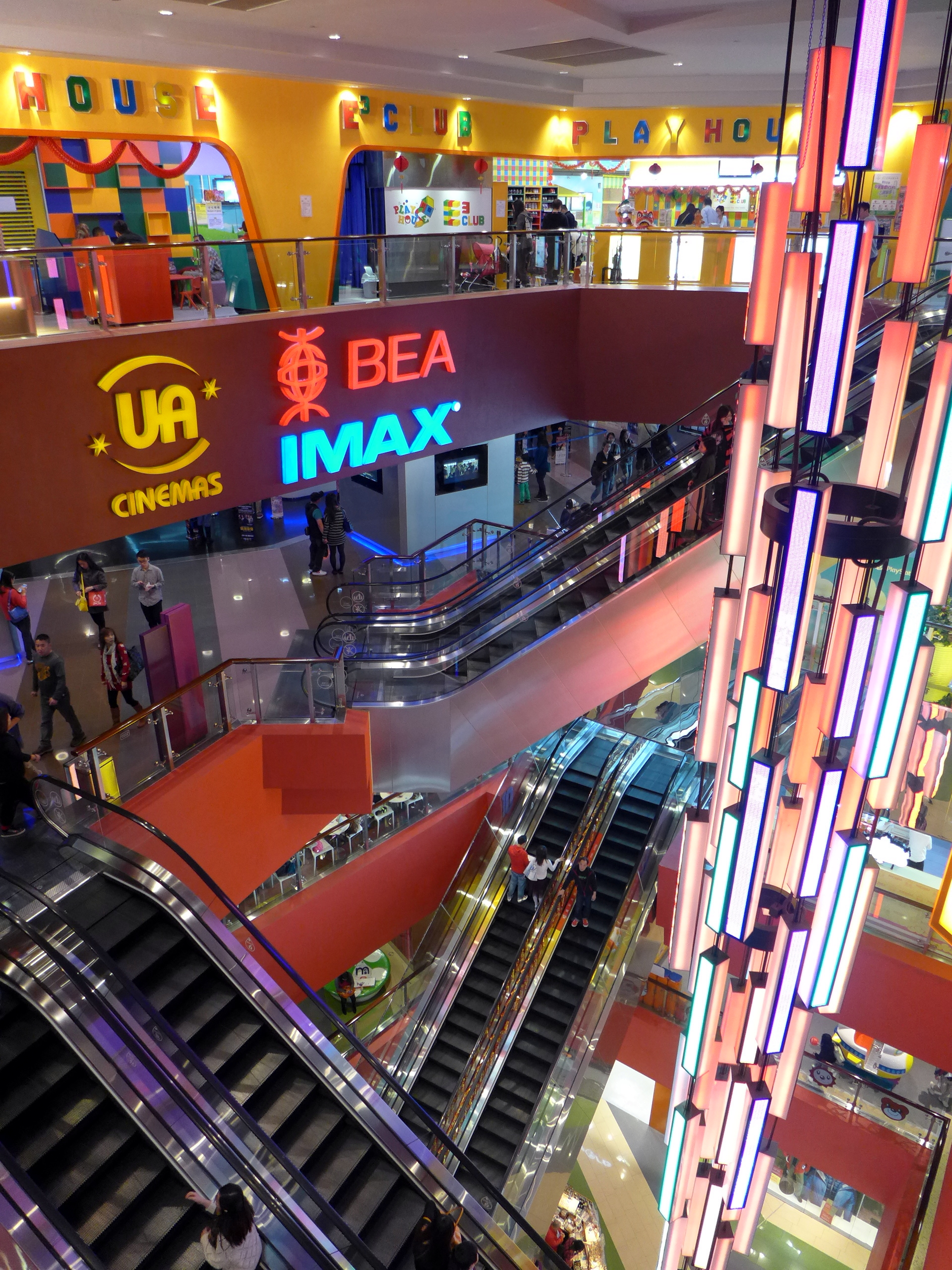
The "Wonderfall" for electronic messages

Designed by architects Jerde, MegaBox has a square and circle front facade in deep red, a propitious Chinese colour.

MegaBox incorporates a concept the mall refers to as "Totally Connected Modules" (TCM), which is purportedly realized in three ways: the free-flow of visitor traffic, facilitated by express escalators and elevators connecting the mall's four major zones; second, through the access driveway reaching all floors; and third, the mall's connectivity with the outside environment through its L5 and Beehive Atriums, both incorporating six-storey glass curtain wall for views natural light.

== The four major zones ==
MegaBox has four distinctive lifestyle-theme zones catering to shoppers’ personalized tastes; they are IN-Style, Better HOME, FAMILY Circus and EATertainment.

=== IN-Style (G/F – L2) ===
The IN-Style Zone spans three floors and encompasses fashion, accessories and superstores. The major tenants are Extravaganza, Hang Seng Bank, McDonald's and Mannings.

Before January 2010, there were several trendy fashion and gift stores, such as PiT, Nici, Mac Look, FX Creations, Extravaganza, Evisu, Scoops, Area 0264 and Novo Concept. However, the shops have since been replaced by a JUSCO Department Store in June 2010, which includes a supermarket and three restaurants.

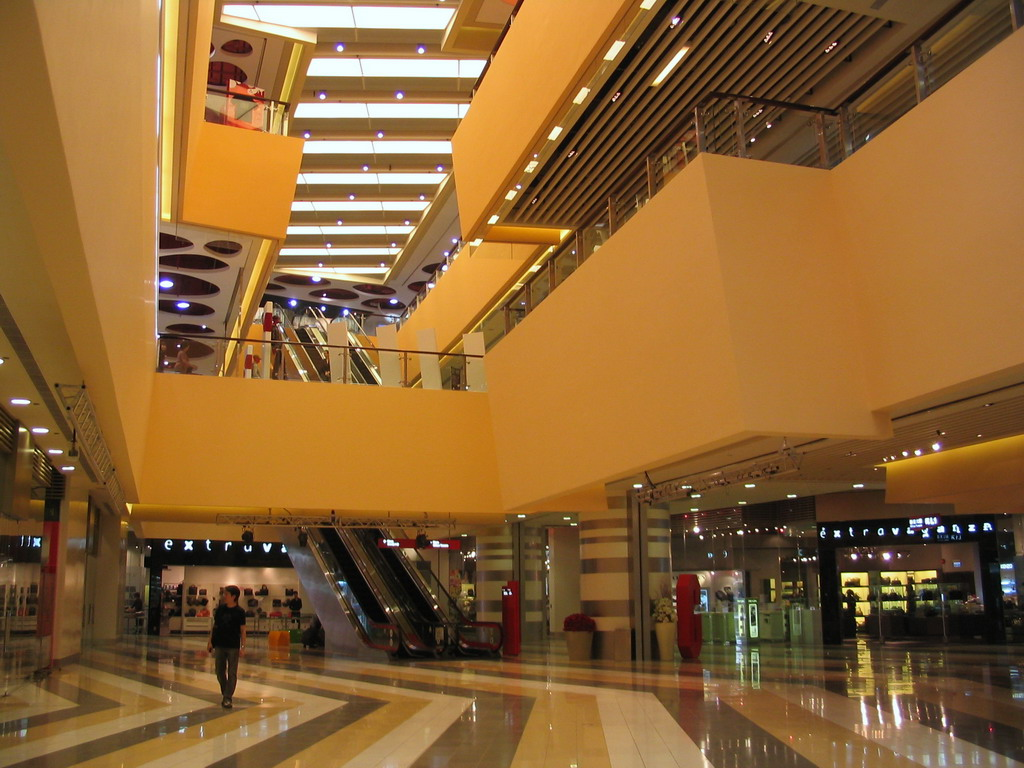
Shops (G/F)

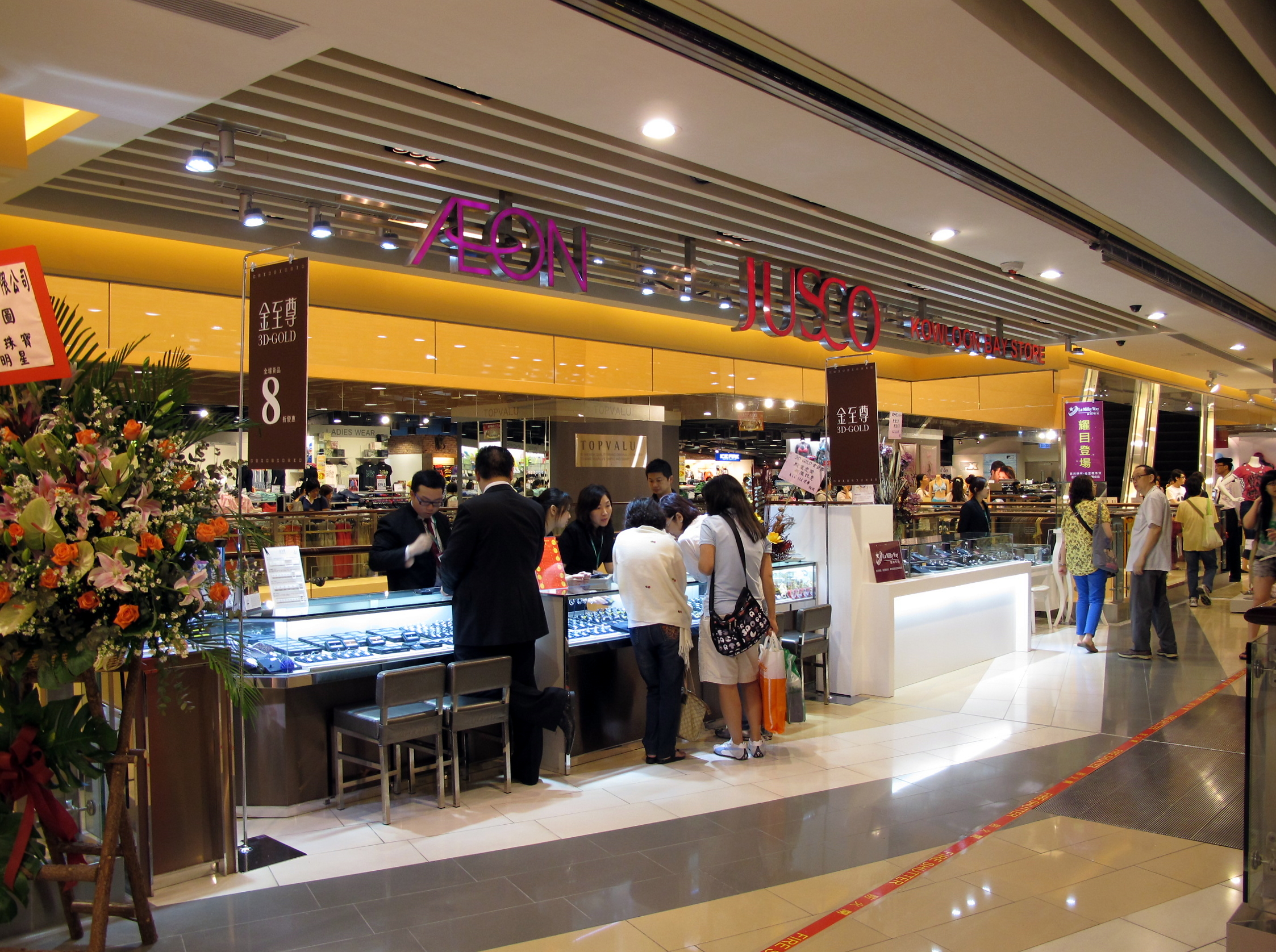
JUSCO Department Store (Level 1-Level 2)

=== Better HOME (L3 – L5) ===
Showcasing house and apartment decoration shops are the three stories of the Better HOME Zone. The major tenants are Giormani Furniture, Simmons, Osim, OTO, and DG Lifestyle Store.

B&Q and Spotlight opened in 2007. However, due to their products' unpopularity in Hong Kong, the shops closed in 2009 and were replaced by IKEA in June 2010.

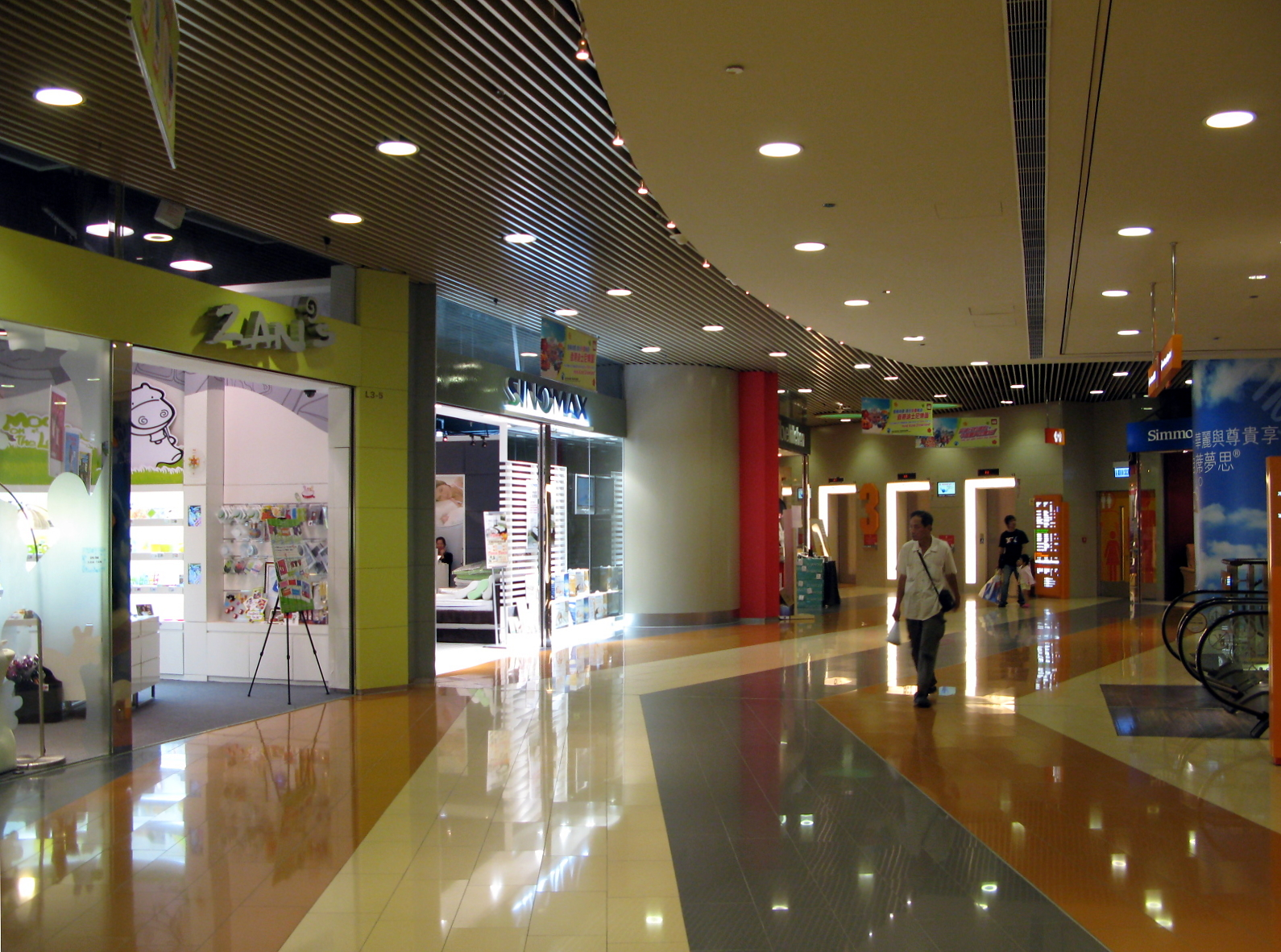
Level 3 Shops

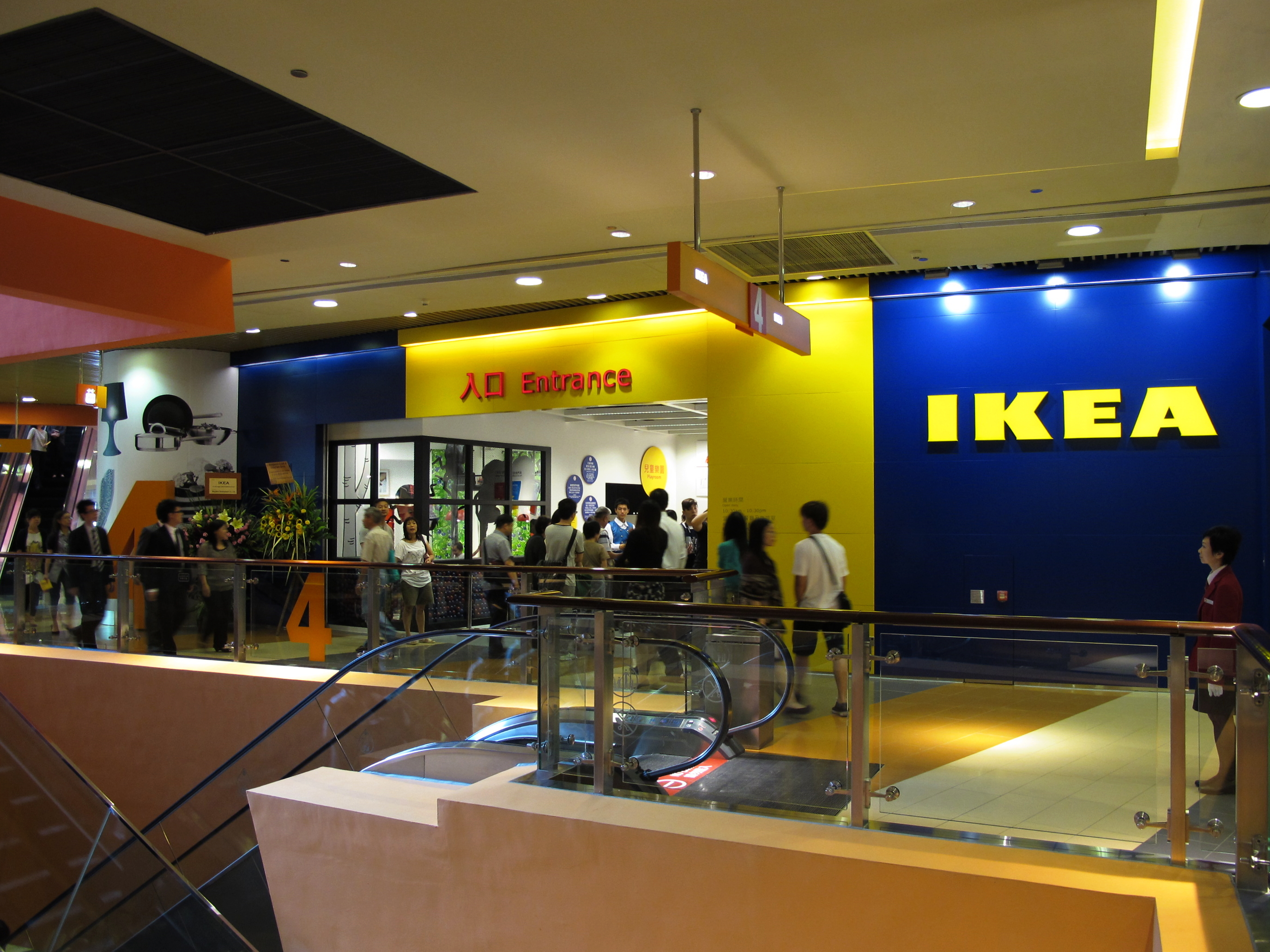
IKEA Kowloon Bay Store Entrance (4/F)

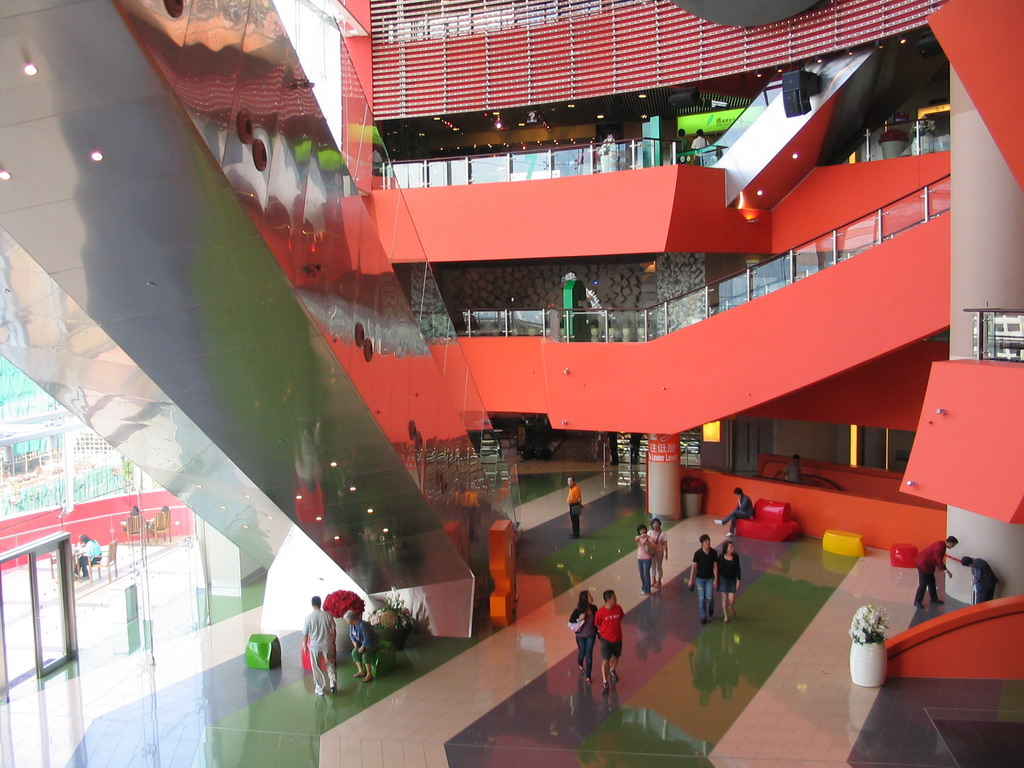
Atrium (5/F)

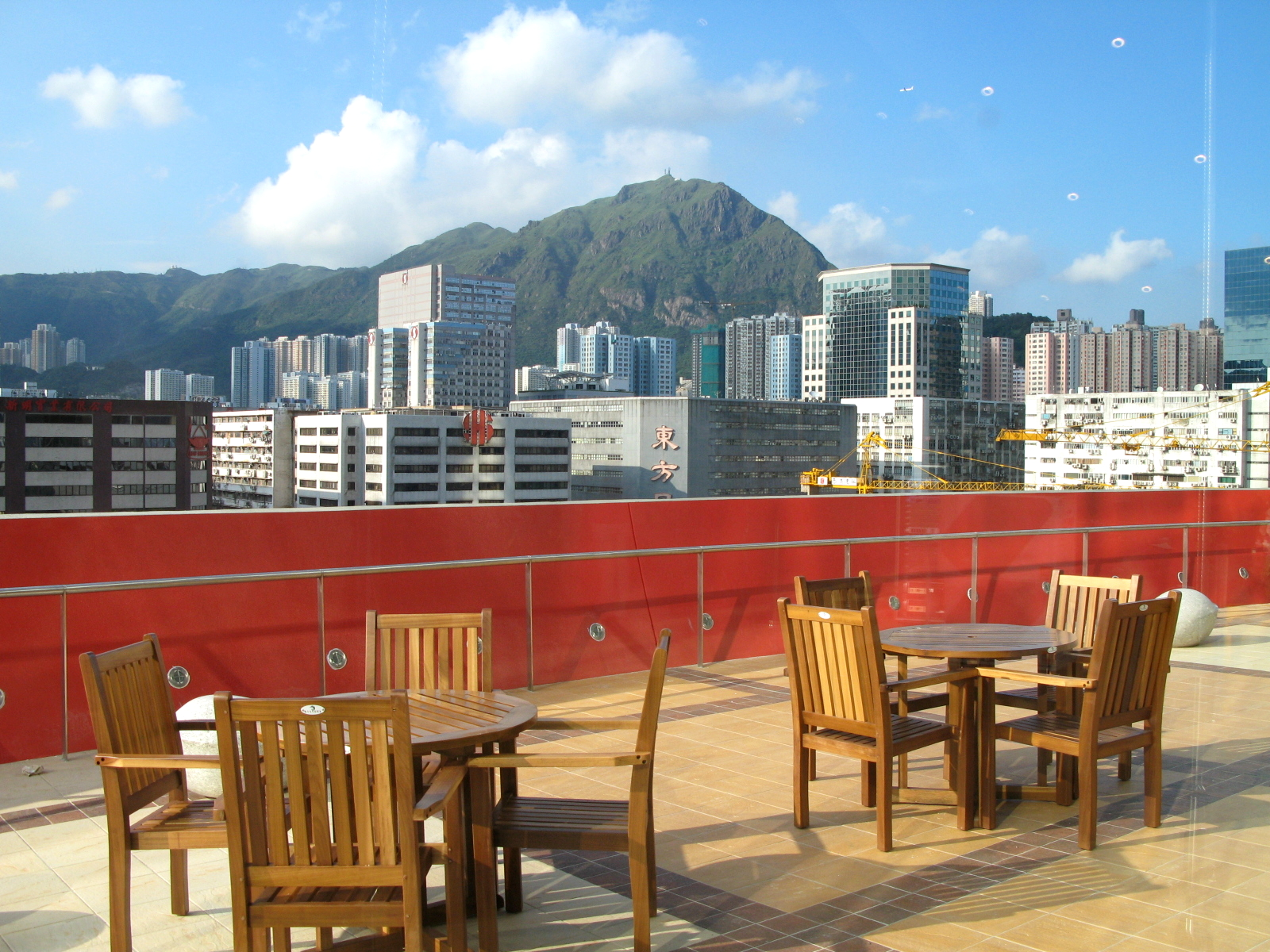
Podium (5/F)

=== FAMILY Circus (L6 – L9) ===
FAMILY Circus offers books, toys, sports, health and music stores as well as electronics & digital outlets.

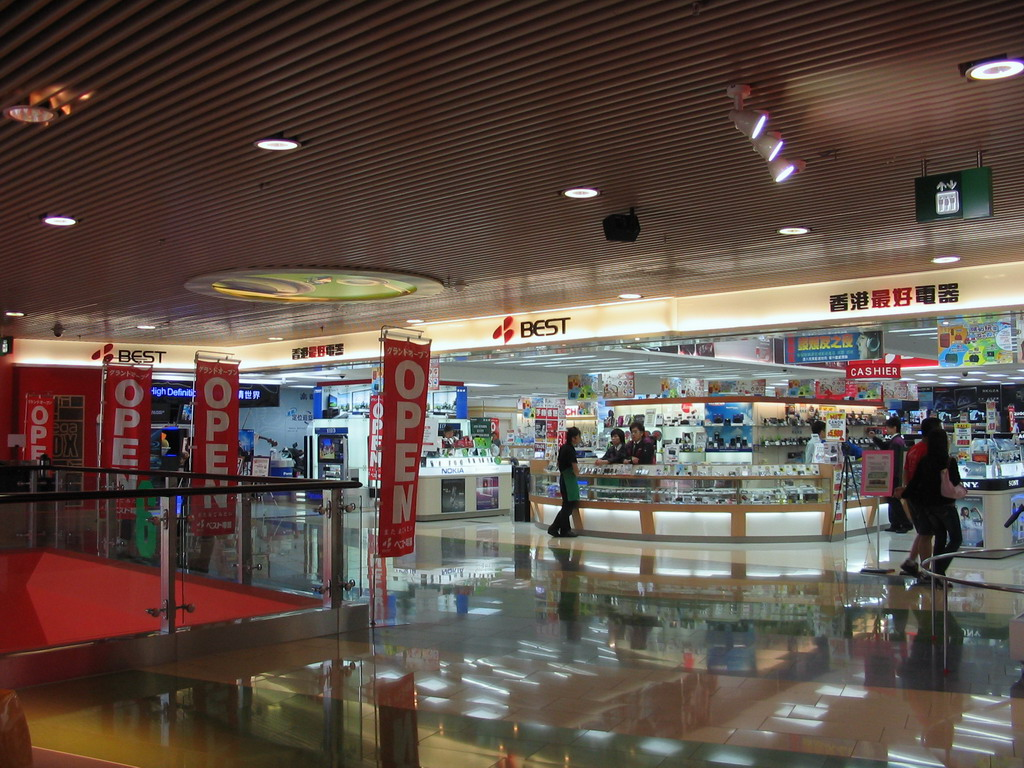
Best Denki in 2007 (6/F)

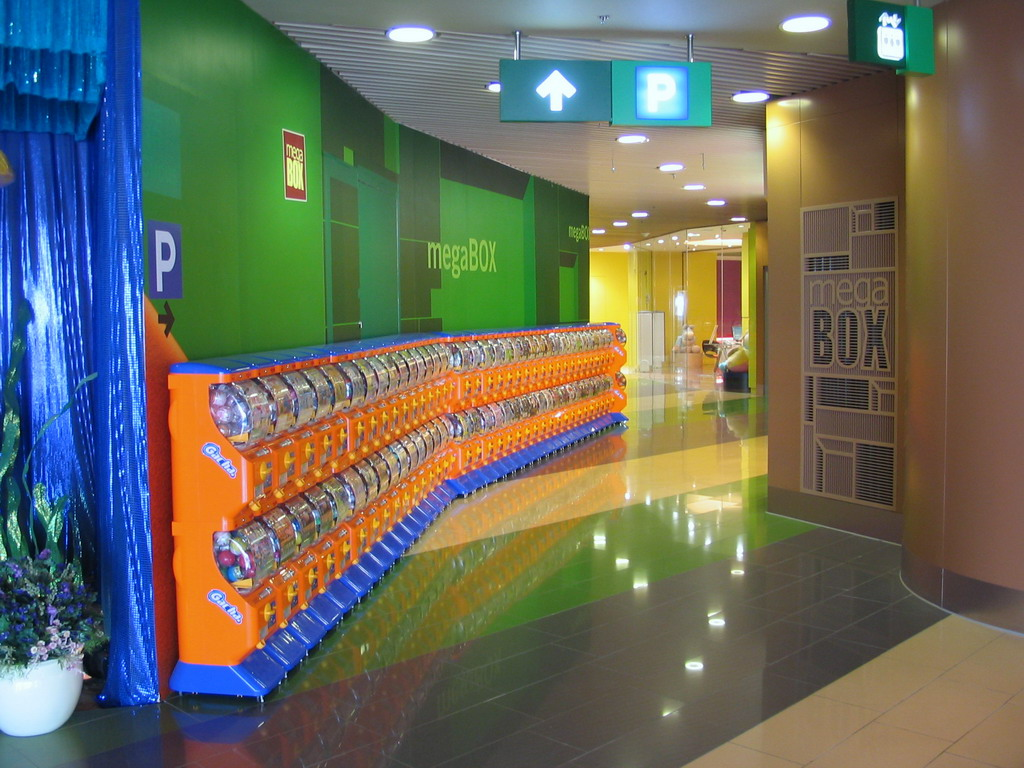
Capsule stations (扭蛋機) (7/F)

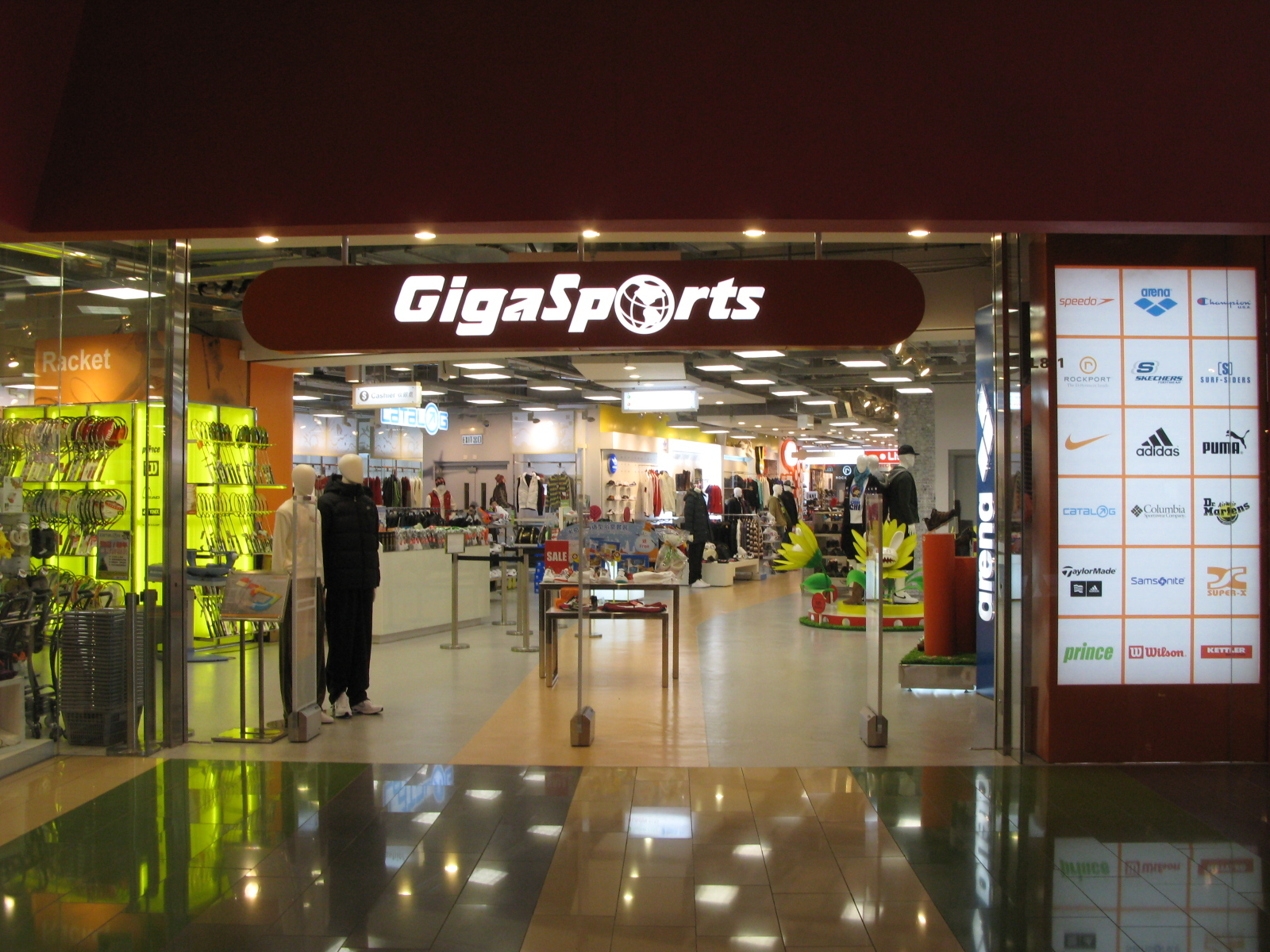
Gigasports (8/F)

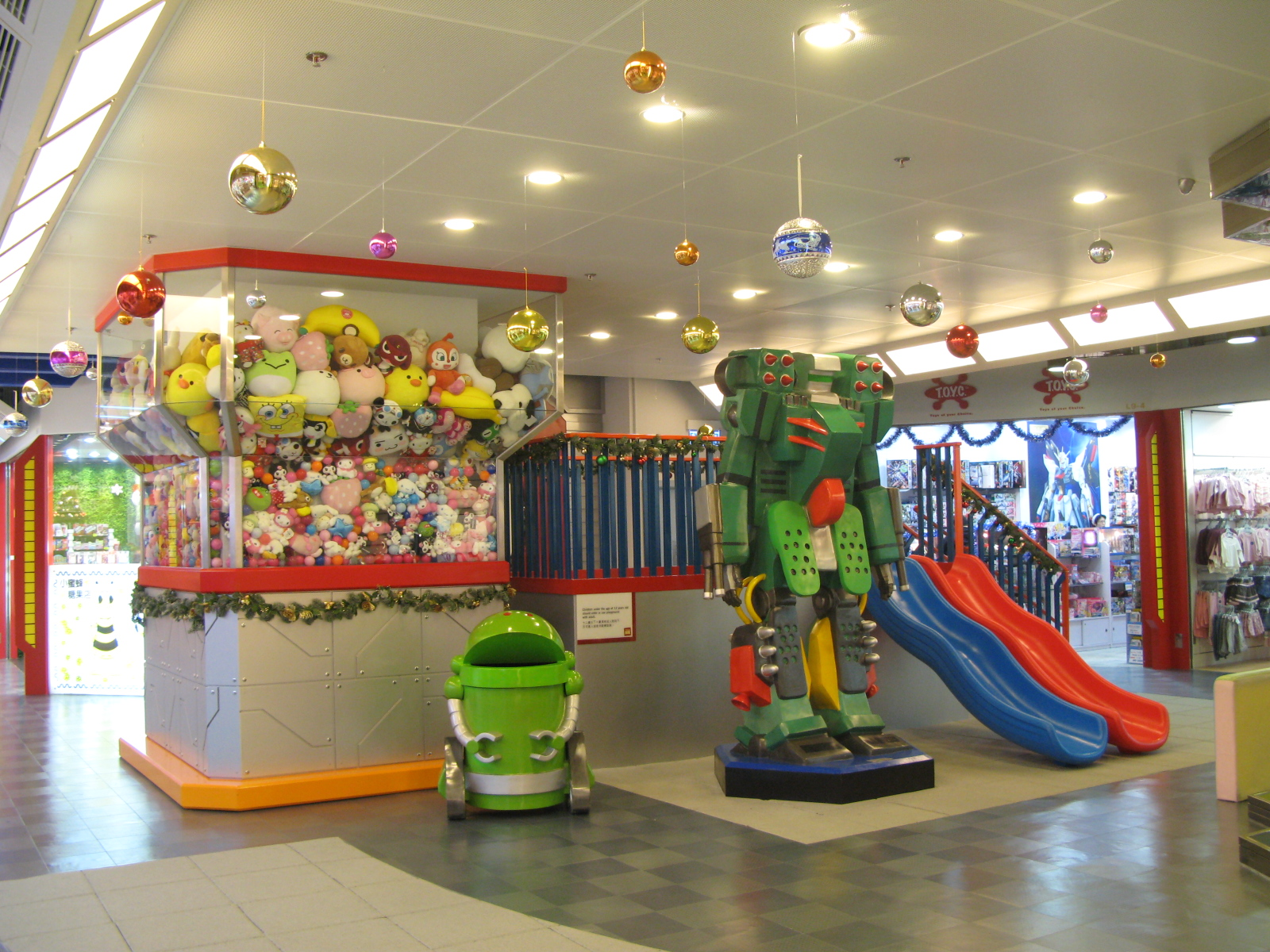
Children's World (9/F)

=== EATertainment (L10 – L14 & L17 – L18) ===
The seven floors of the EATertainment Zone follow, featuring theme restaurants, international deli, ice-skating rink and movie theatres. In November 2020, there is a new open indoor playground, The Wonderful World of Whimsy, which is the first time open in the mall, it is the third shop in Hong Kong.

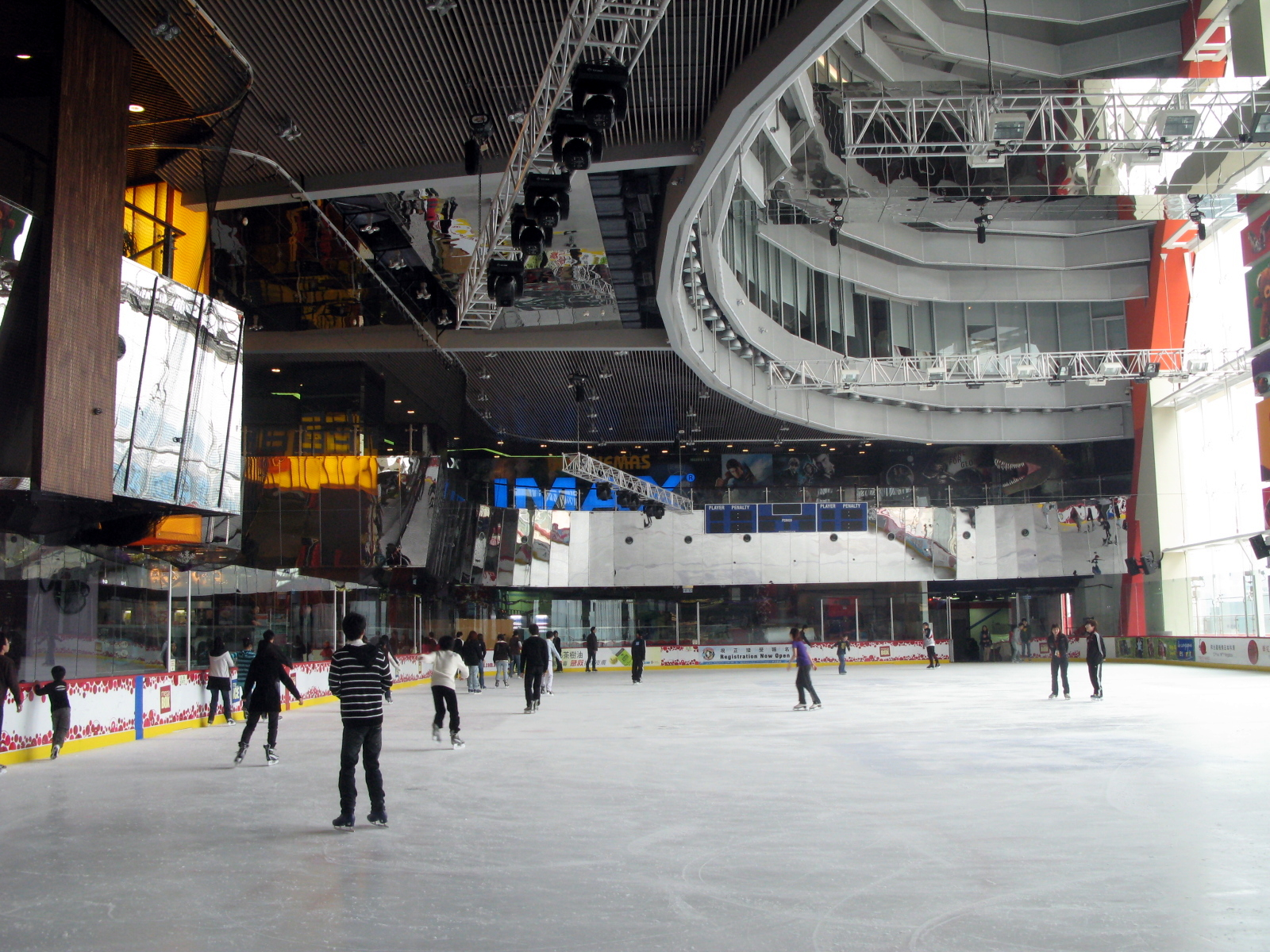
MegaICE skating rink (10/F)

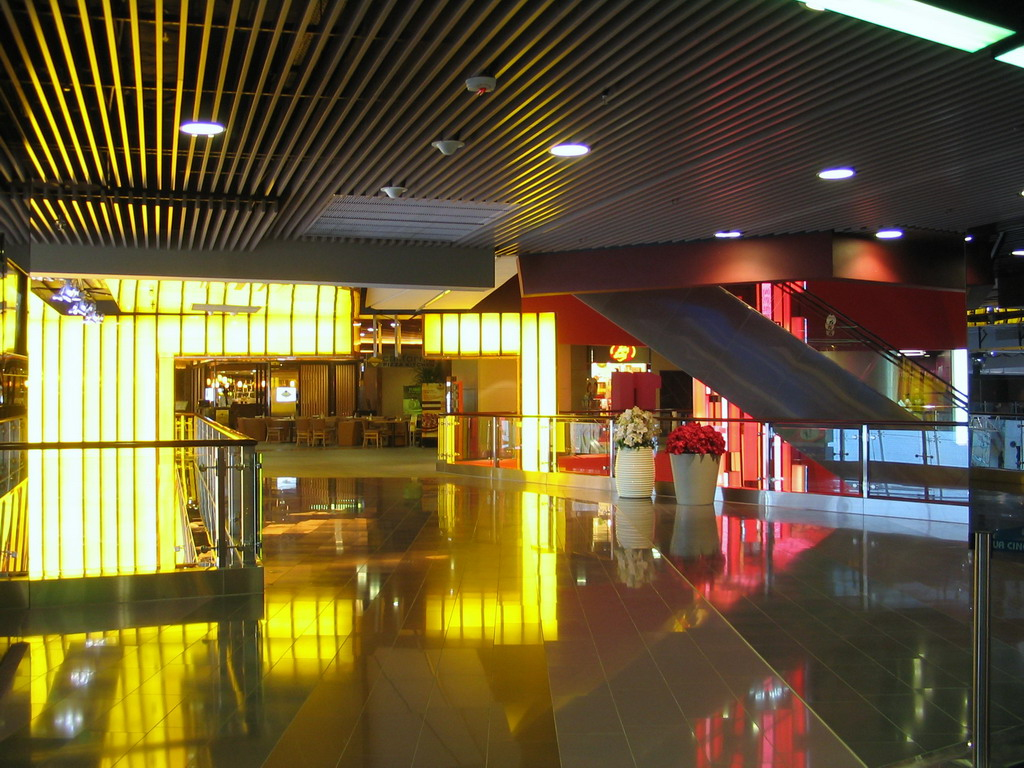
11/F

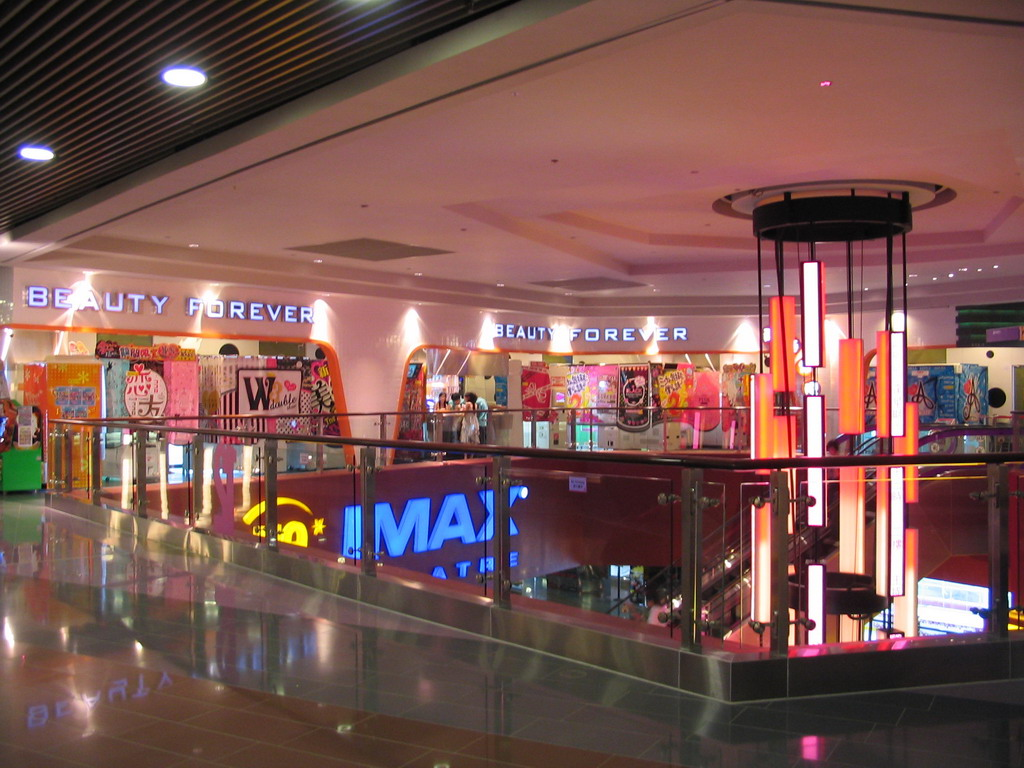
Shops (12/F)

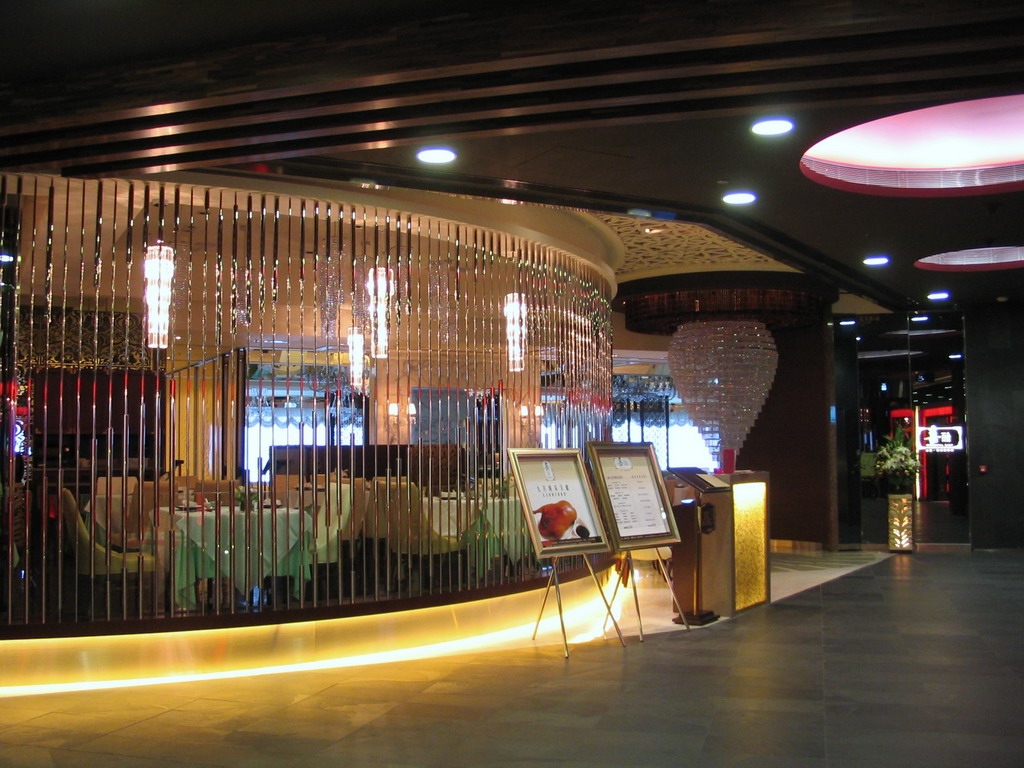
Chinese restaurants (13/F)

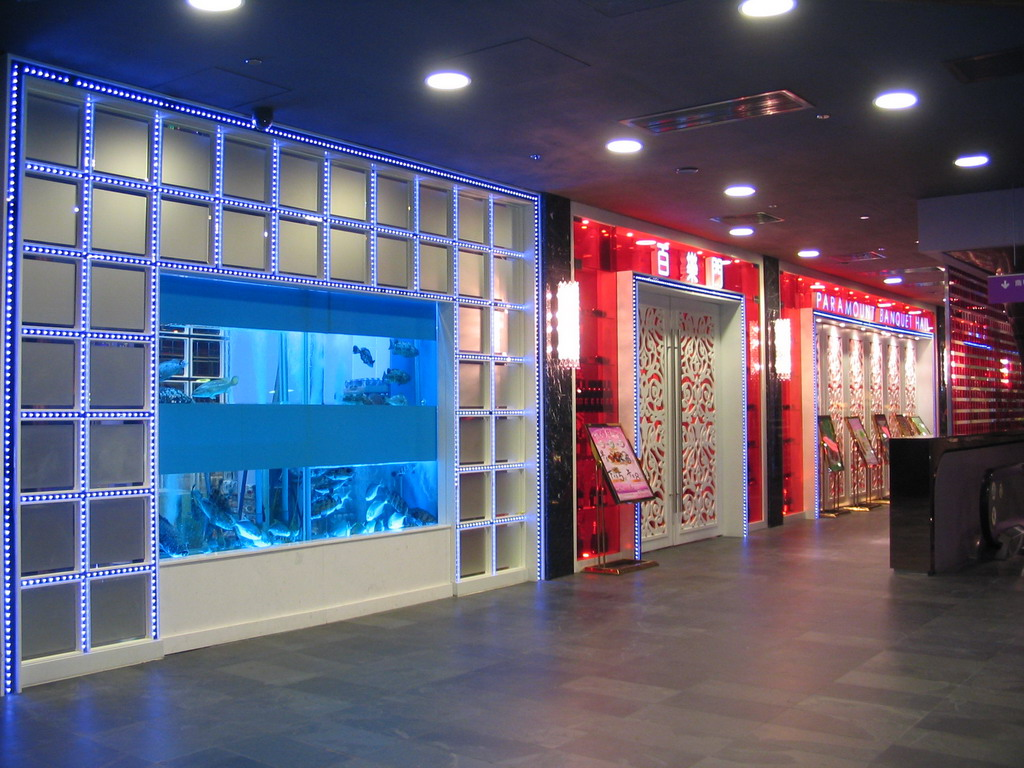
Paramount Banquet Hall (14/F)

== Previous tenants ==
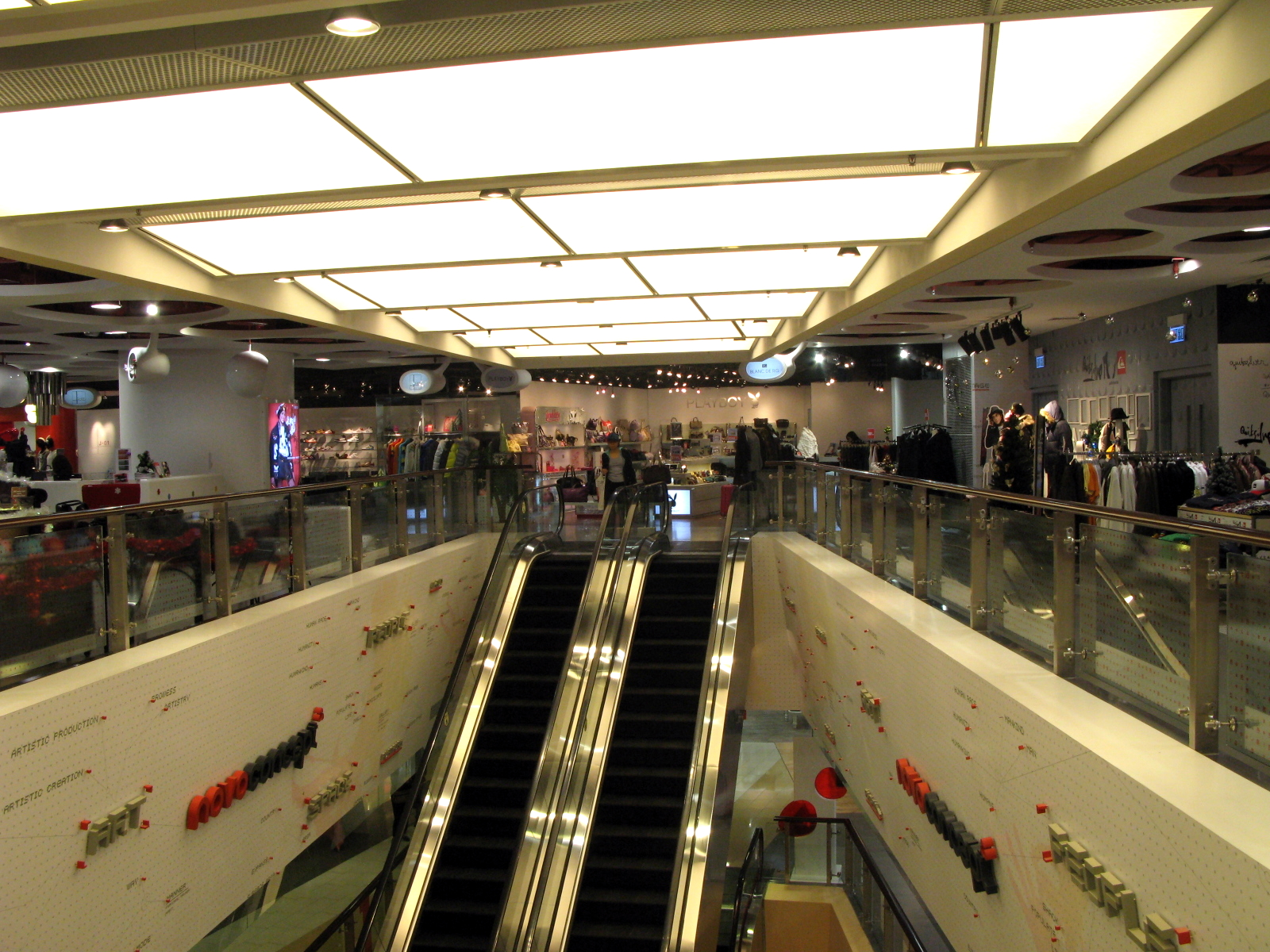
NOVO concept fashion flagship store (2/F)

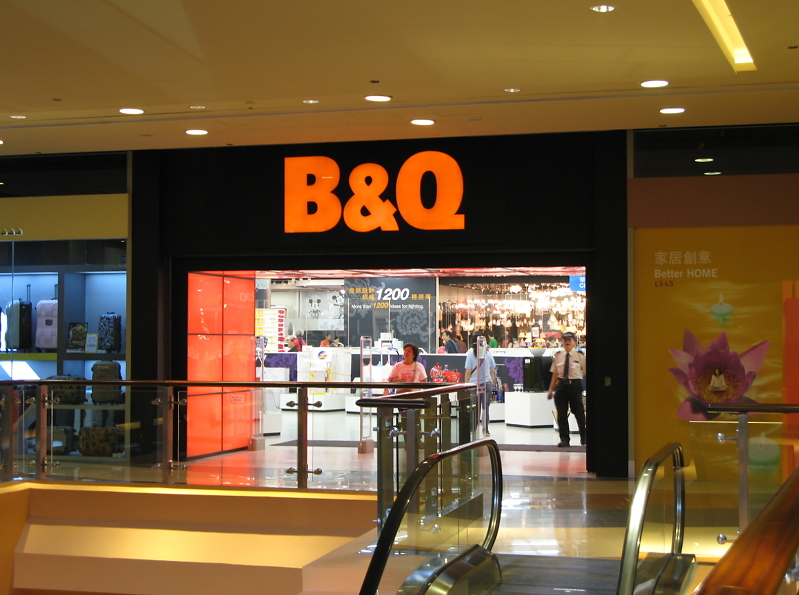
B&Q(4/F)

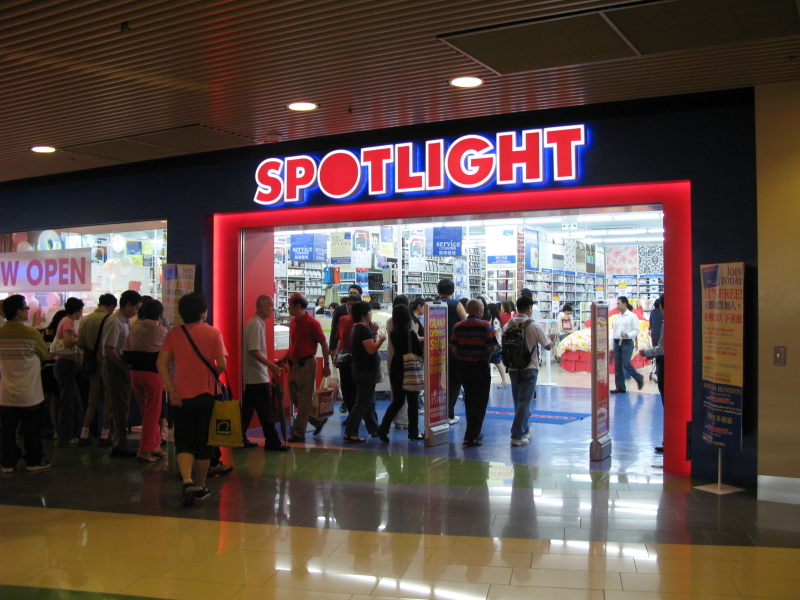
Spotlight(5/F)

- B&Q (closure on September 14, 2009)
- Spotlight (closure on December 31, 2009)
- NOVO Concept (closure in January 2010)
- PlayStation PlayGround (closure on January 28, 2010)

== Transportation ==
MegaBox provides a shuttle bus route to Telford Plaza. The route is free of charge. Bus routes 14X, 15A, 15P, 28B, 74A, 107, 297, 606 and 641 are available for passengers to Kwun Tong, Tai Po, Aberdeen, Tin Wan, Tseung Kwan O, Chai Wan, Central, etc.

Minibus routes 15, 48, 68, 106, 110, 111 are also available for passengers to Kowloon Bay, Shun Lee Estate, Choi Wan Estate and Tseung Kwan O.

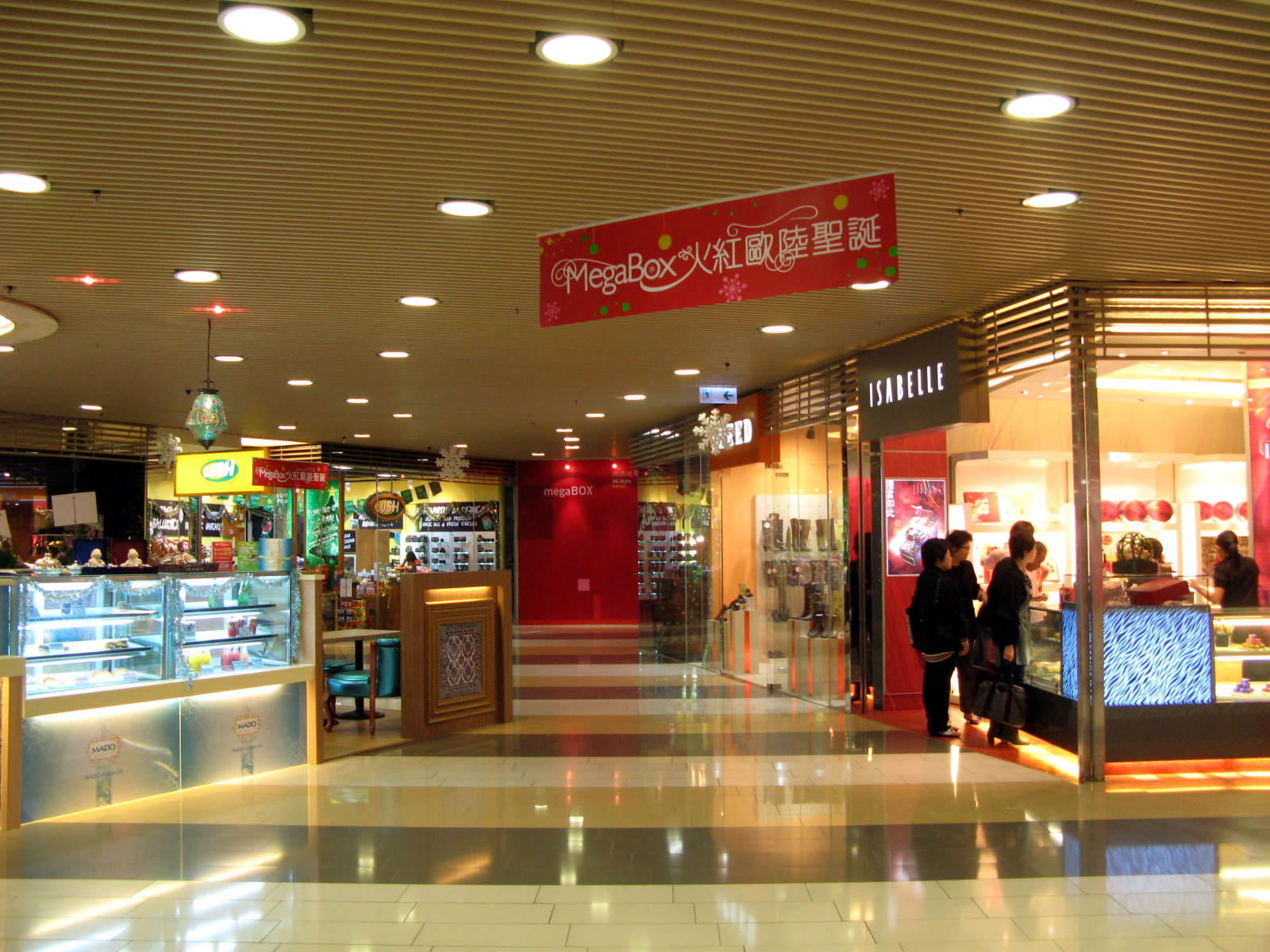
Shops (1/F)

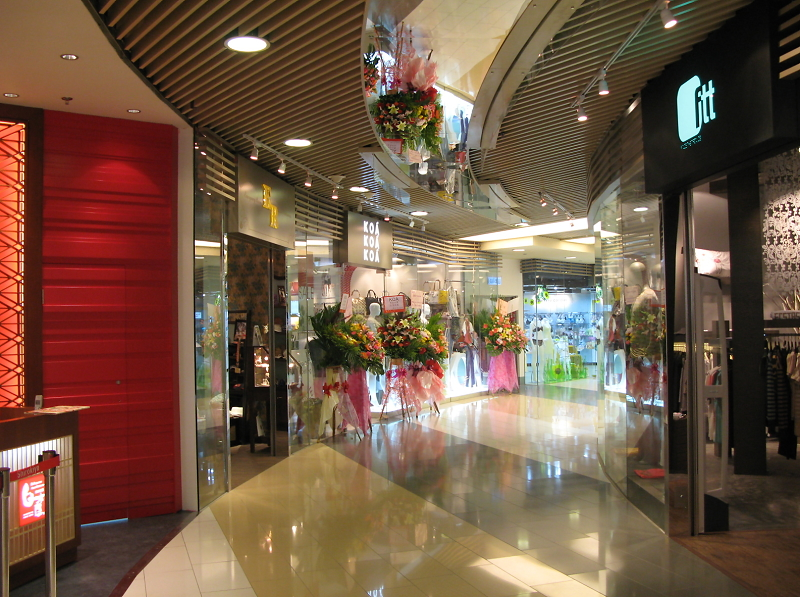
Shops (2/F)
