= The Gateway, Hong Kong =

Building in Hong Kong

Coordinates: 22.29776°N 114.16825°E

- Traditional Chinese: 港威大廈
- Simplified Chinese: 港威大厦
Transcriptions
Standard Mandarin
- Hanyu Pinyin: Gǎngwēi Dàshà
Yue: Cantonese
- Jyutping: gong2 wai1 daai6 haa6

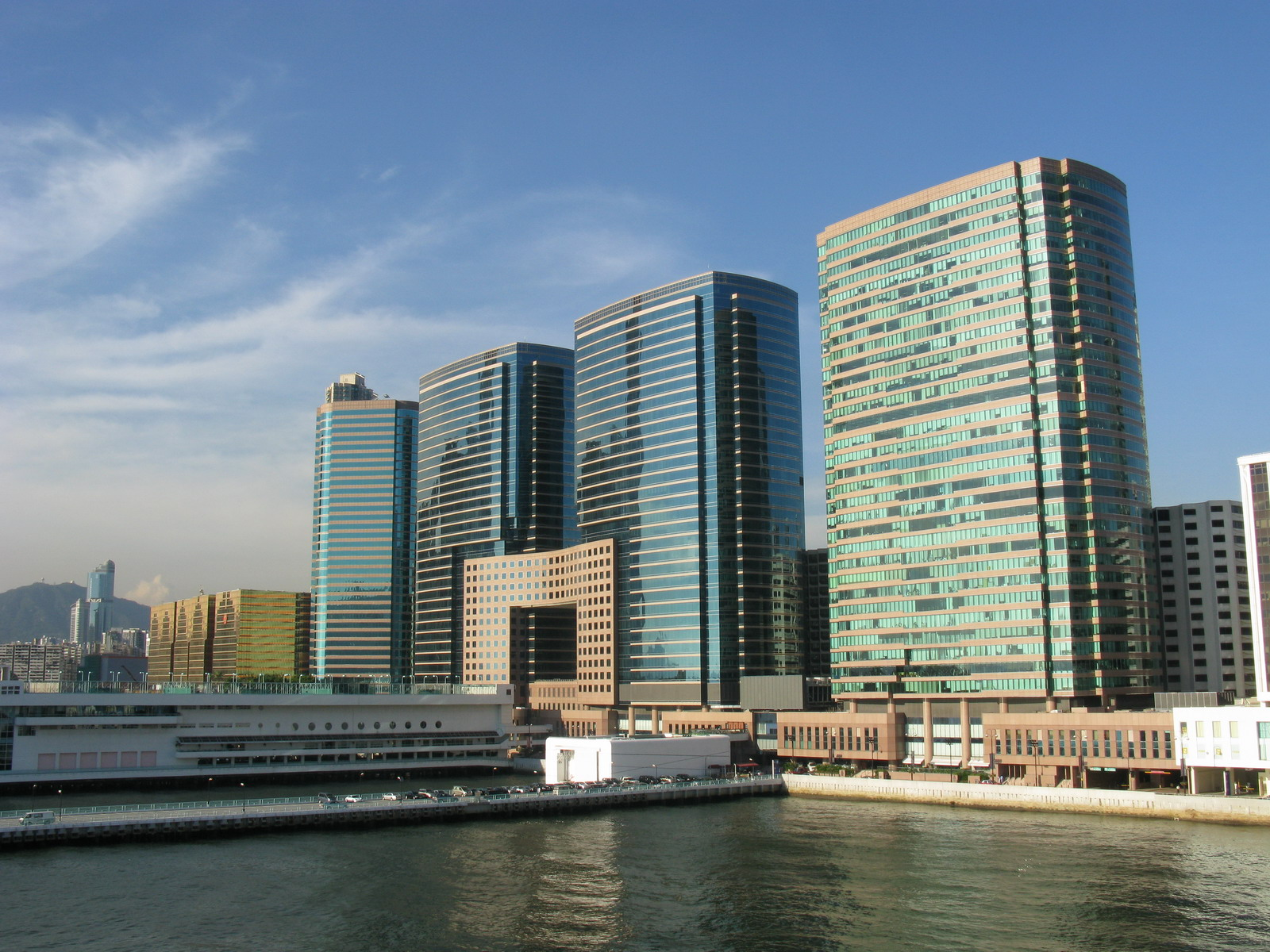
The Gateway

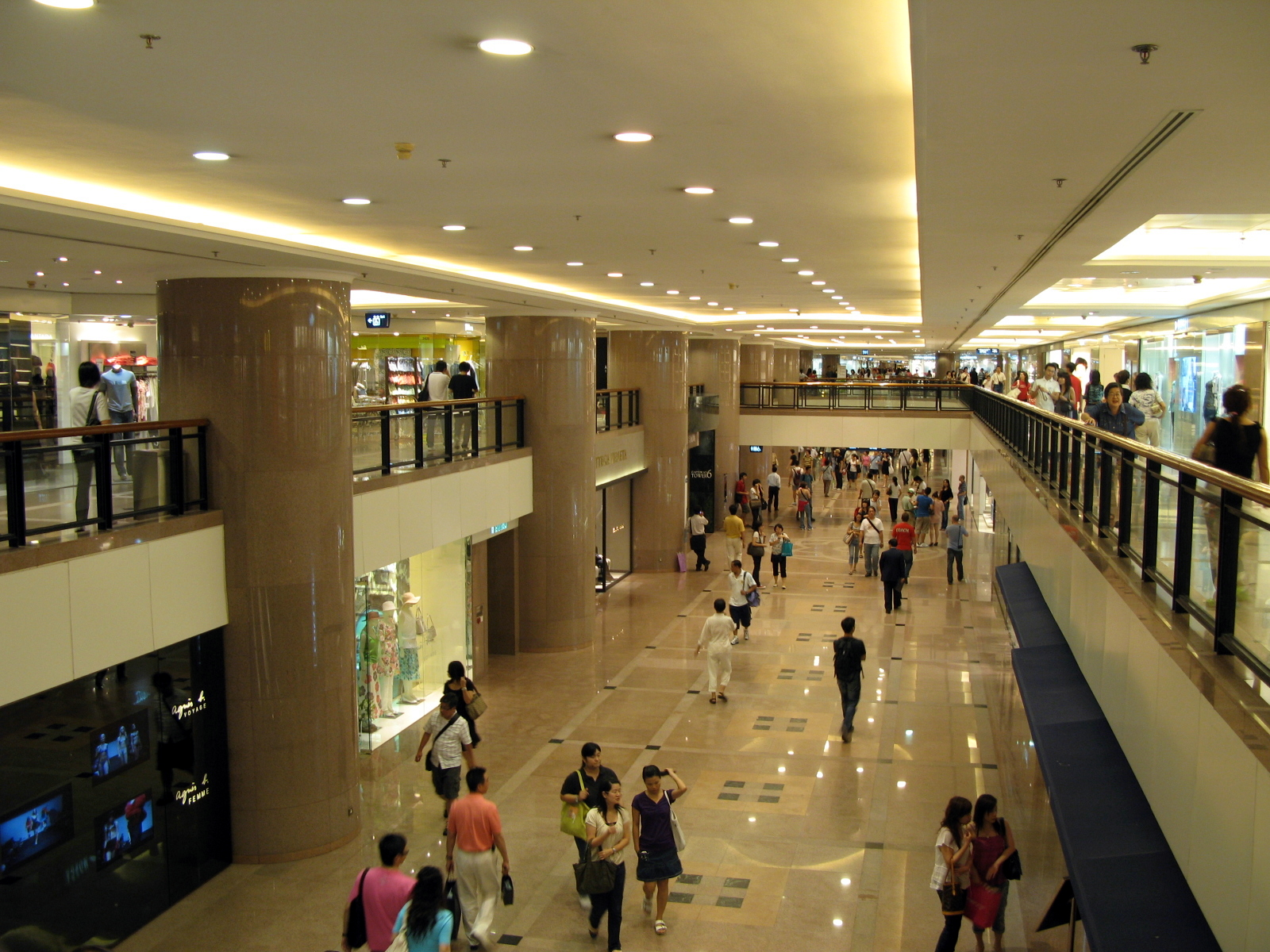
The Gateway Shopping Arcade

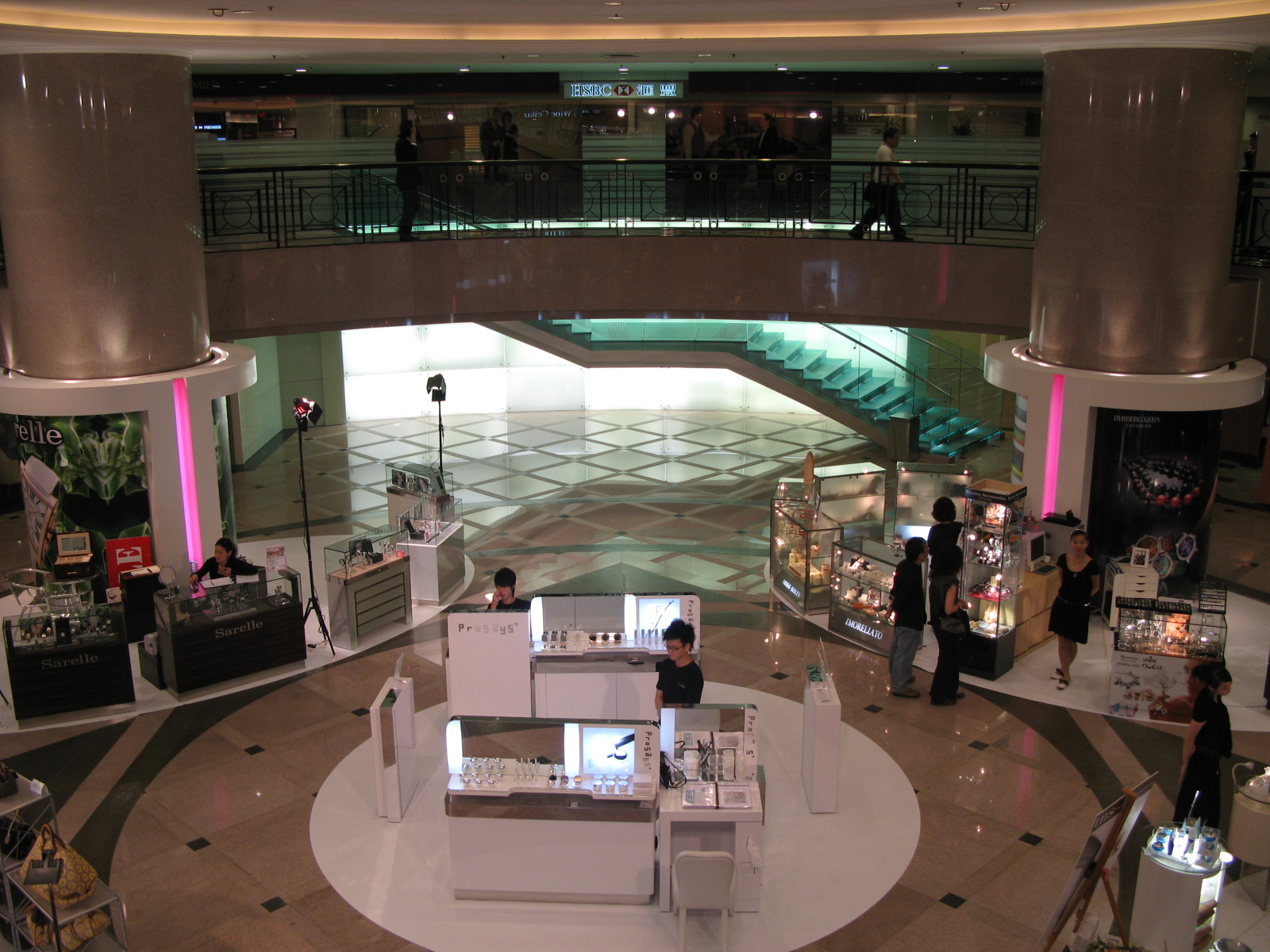
Beauty @ The Atrium in 2007, removed after renovation in 2012

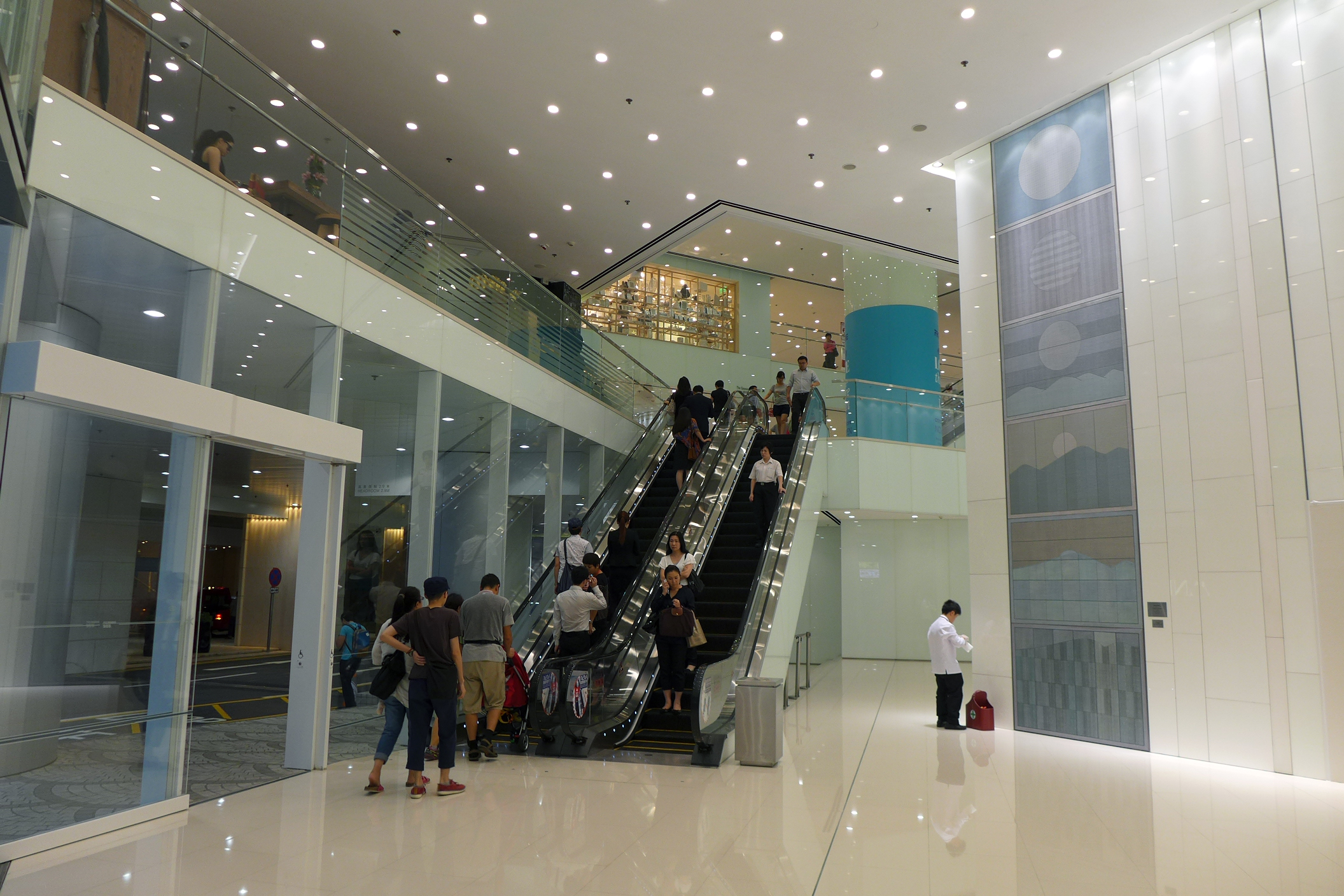
Entrance Atrium after renovation in 2012

The Gateway (Chinese: 港威大廈; Jyutping: gong2 wai1 daai6 haa6), part of Harbour City, is the office buildings with shopping arcade at lower level in Tsim Sha Tsui, Kowloon, Hong Kong.

== Tenants ==
Agoda has its Hong Kong Office in Tower 6. All Nippon Airways has its Hong Kong Office in Room 1908 in Tower 6.
