= Tsim Sha Tsui Centre and Empire Centre =

Buildings in Hong Kong

Coordinates: 22°17′53.15″N 114°10′41.79″E

- Traditional Chinese: 尖沙咀中心及帝國中心
- Simplified Chinese: 尖沙咀中心及帝国中心
Transcriptions
Standard Mandarin
- Hanyu Pinyin: Jiānshāzuǐ Zhōngxīn jí Dìguó Zhōngxīn
Yue: Cantonese
- Jyutping: zim1 saa1 zeoi2 zung1 sam1 gap6 dai3 gwok3 zung1 sam1

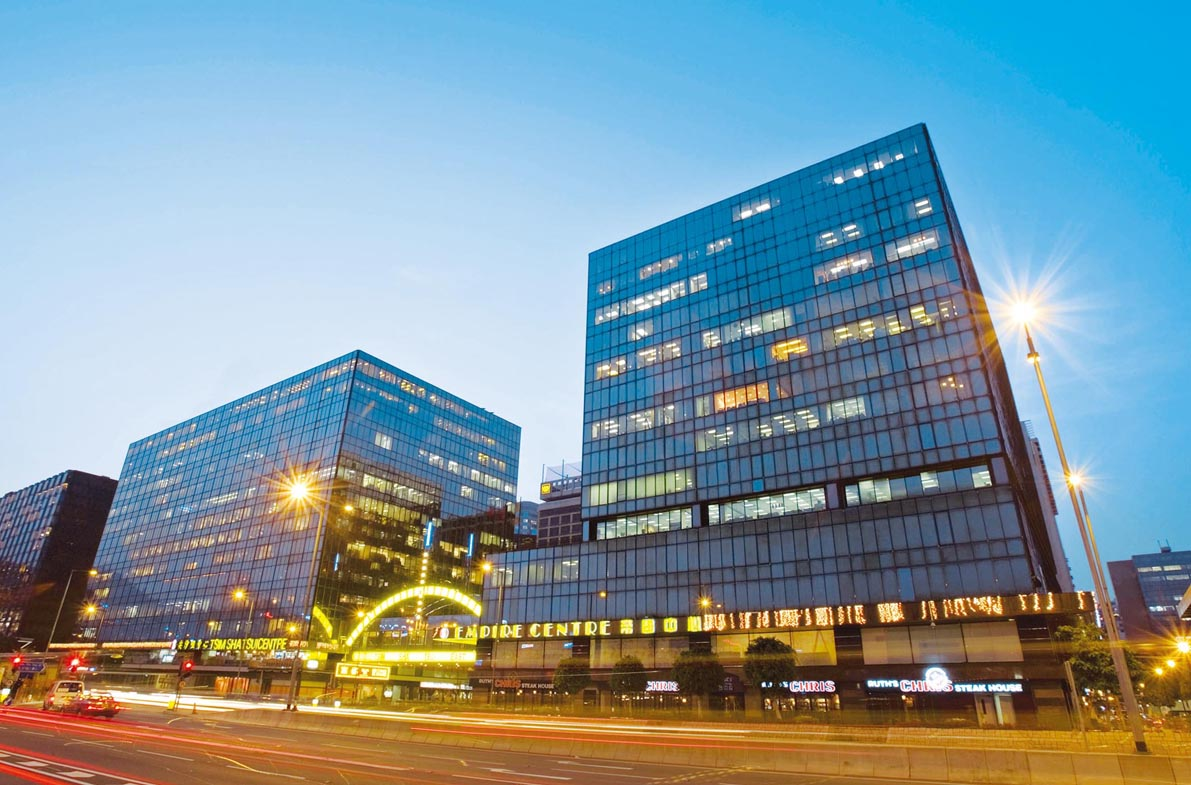
Tsim Sha Tsui Centre (left) and Empire Centre (right) at night.

Tsim Sha Tsui Centre (Chinese: 尖沙咀中心) and Empire Centre (帝國中心) are two office buildings and shopping malls in East Tsim Sha Tsui, Kowloon, Hong Kong. They are connected by a covered pedestrian bridge.

== History ==
The Tsim Sha Tsui Centre was developed in 1980 by Sino Group, where the headquarters are now located. It was the first building built in East Tsim Sha Tsui. The architect of the building was Wong & Ouyang.

== Access ==
They shopping malls are located near the Tsim Sha Tsui East station and the Star Ferry service to Hong Kong Island.
