= Harcourt House (Hong Kong) =

Coordinates: 22.27895°N 114.17003°E

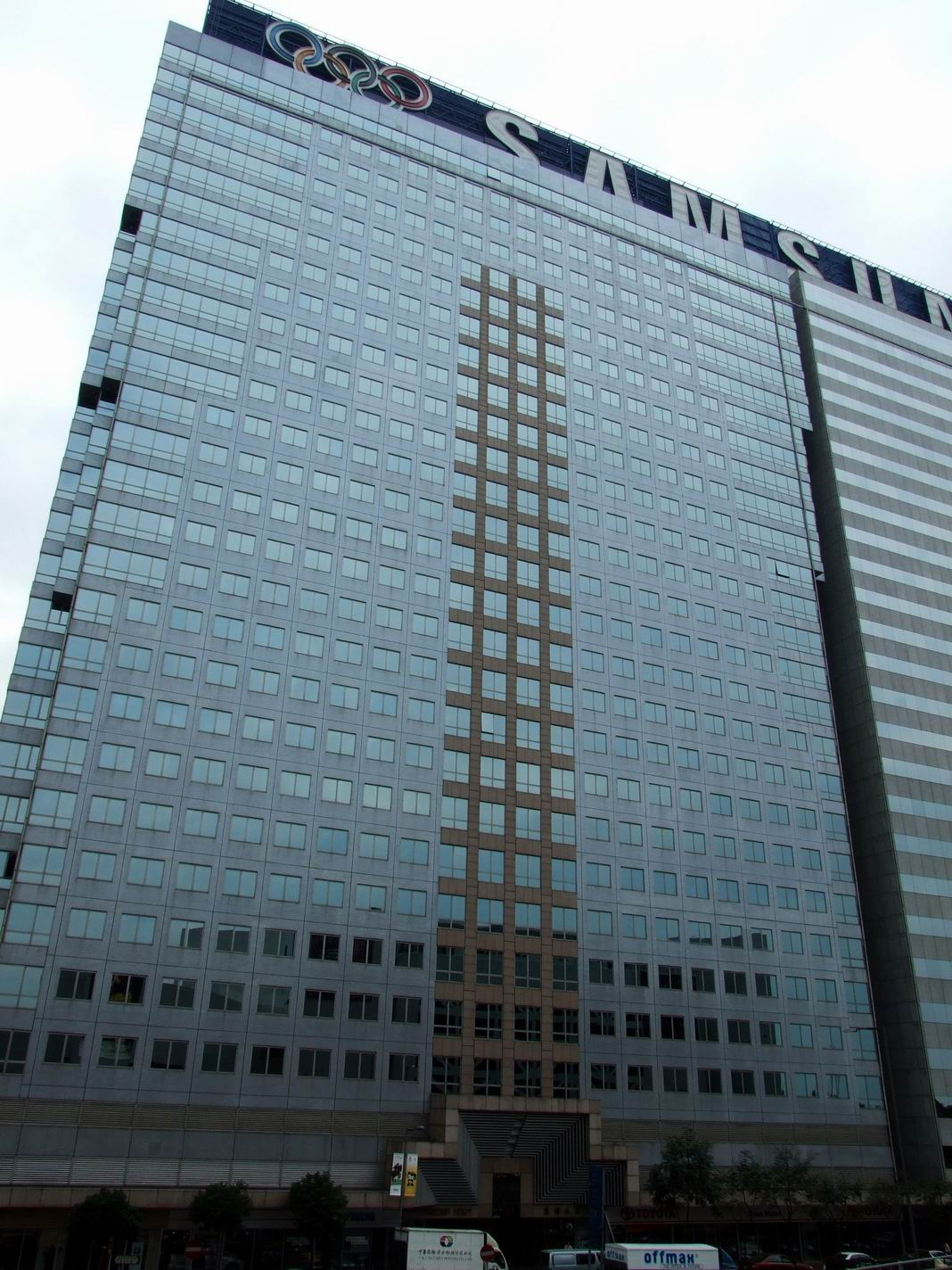
夏愨大廈

Harcourt House (Chinese: 夏愨大廈), located on Gloucester Road in the Wan Chai area of Hong Kong, is a 27 floor Grade A commercial office building. It lies between Admiralty and Wan Chai MTR stations opposite the Hong Kong Academy for Performing Arts.

The building won the Hong Kong Institute of Architects Architectural Design Award. It was built by Hongkong Land in December 1987 who retained ownership until it was sold to Chinese Estates Holdings in 1996. Major tenants formerly included the Hong Kong Law Reform Commission Secretariat on the 20th floor.
