= Kerry Properties =

Hong Kong based property development company

Kerry Properties Limited 嘉里建設有限公司
- Type: Listed company
- Traded as: SEHK: 683
- Founded: 1978; 48 years ago
- Headquarters: Quarry Bay, Hong Kong
- Area served: Hong Kong; Mainland China
- Key people: Khoon Hua Kuok (Chairman)
- Revenue: ▼HK$18.025 billion (2019)
- Operating income: ▼HK$18.025 billion (2019)
- Net income: ▲HK$29.9 million (2019)
- Total assets: ▲HK$158.048 billion (2019)
- Total equity: ▲HK$1.456 billion (2019)
- Number of employees: 8,400 (2019)
- Subsidiaries: Shangri-La Hotels and Resorts; Travel Aim Investment B.V.
- Website: kerryprops.com

Kerry Properties Limited
- Traditional Chinese: 嘉里建設有限公司
- Simplified Chinese: 嘉里建设有限公司
Transcriptions
Standard Mandarin
- Hanyu Pinyin: Jiālǐ Jiànshè Yǒuxiàngōngsī
Yue: Cantonese
- Jyutping: gaa1 lei5 gin3 cit3 jau5 haan6 gung1 si1

Kerry Properties Limited is a listed company engaged in property development in Hong Kong, Mainland China and Asia Pacific region; infrastructure projects in Hong Kong and mainland China; and hotel ownership and operations in mainland China with its head office in Quarry Bay.

== Overview ==
They formerly also engaged in third-party logistics, freight services and warehouse operations, however the former subsidiary was listed on 19 December 2013, under the name Kerry Logistics Network (SEHK: 636).

Its largest shareholder is the family of Robert Kuok, a Malaysian Chinese businessman and the founder of Shangri-La Hotels and Resorts. It incorporated in Bermuda with limited liability and was listed on the Hong Kong Stock Exchange in 1996.

In June 2024, Kerry Properties Limited was among ten companies to receive the (Building and Construction Information) BCI Asia Top 10 Developers Award.

== Subsidiaries ==
=== Operators of Shangri-La Hotels and Resorts brand ===
- Shangri-La Asia Limited is incorporated in Bermuda with limited liability. It is primarily listed on the Stock Exchange of Hong Kong Limited (stock code 00069) with a secondary listing on the Singapore Exchange Securities Trading Limited (stock code Shang Asia 2kHK$) and with American Depositary Receipt traded as SHALY. Since 1997, Shangri-La Asia Limited has owned Shangri-La International Hotel Management Limited.
- Shangri-La Hotels (Malaysia) Berhad is incorporated in Malaysia with limited liability and is traded on the Bursa Malaysia Securities Berhad (stock code 5517).
- Shangri-La Hotel Public Company Limited is incorporated in Thailand with limited liability and is traded on the Stock Exchange of Thailand (stock code SHANG).

=== Travel Aim Investment B.V. ===
Travel Aim Investment B.V. is a privately-held holding company of Kerry Properties, which owns a plurality share of publicly-listed Shang Properties.

== See also ==
- Shangri-La Hotels
