= Aaron Badgley =

Canadian music journalist, music critic, radio host, and author

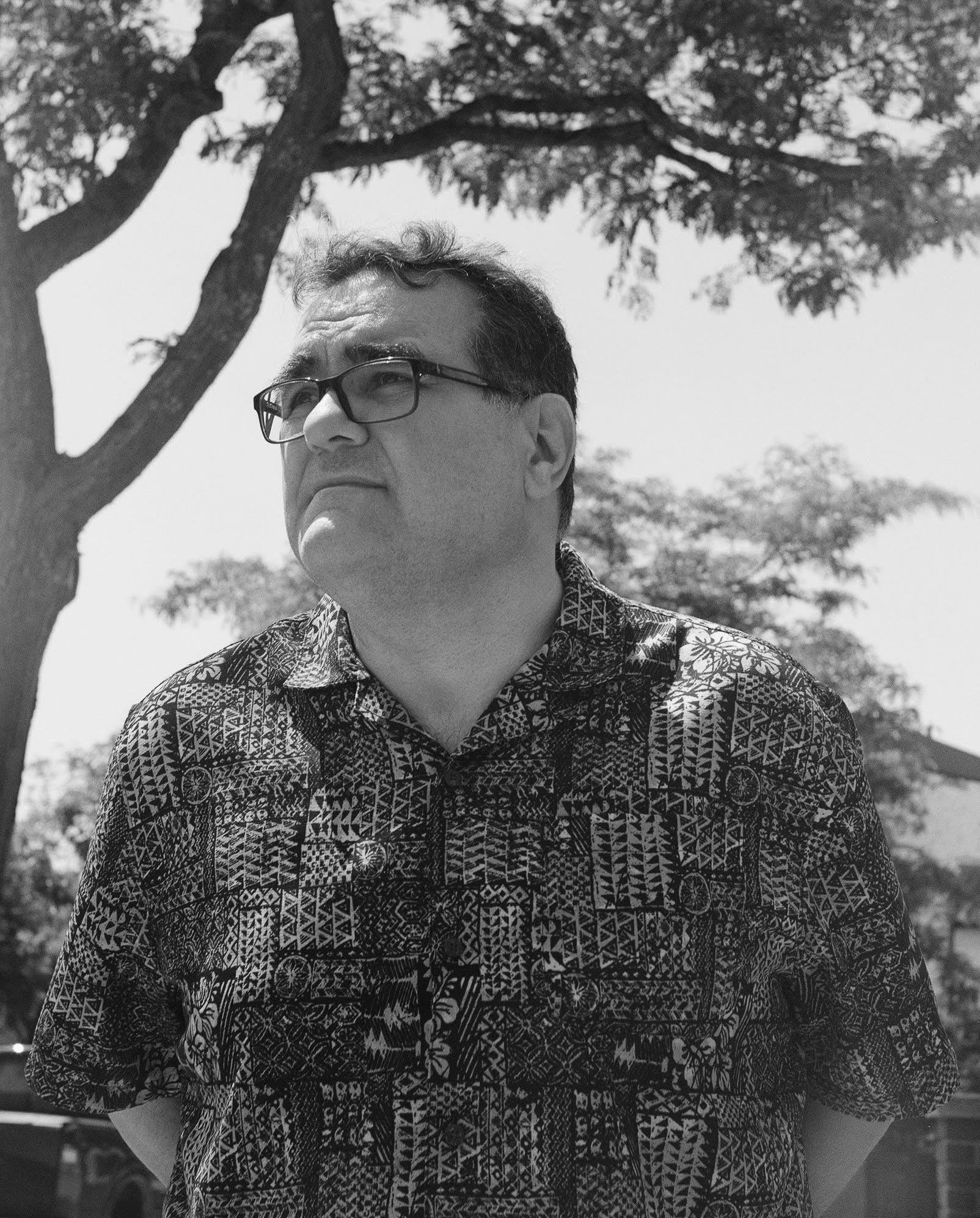
- Badgley in 2021
- Born: August 29, 1964 (age 62); Oshawa, Ontario, Canada
- Education: Anderson Collegiate Vocational Institute; Centennial College; University of Ottawa; University of Toronto
- Occupations: Music journalist; music critic; radio host; podcaster; author; biographer
- Writing career
- Language: English
- Years active: 1978–present
- Subjects: Music review; artist interview; music biography
- Website: www.aaron-badgley.com

Aaron Badgley (born August 29, 1964) is a Canadian music journalist, music critic, radio host, podcaster, author, and biographer. As a music critic and journalist, he has written for AllMusic Guide, The Fulcrum, The Spill Magazine, Lexicon Magazine, Immersive Audio Album, WA12Radio, the Anderson Collegiate Vocational Institute student newspaper, and several Beatles fan magazines, including Strawberry Fields Forever, Beatlefan, and Good Day Sunshine Magazine.

== Background ==
He worked as a writer, producer, and production manager for several radio stations in Ontario's Durham Region, including CKAR-FM and CKQT-FM (both in Oshawa), and CHOO-FM (in Ajax). His first radio show was broadcast on CKCC-FM, Centennial College's campus radio station (in Scarborough), and he later hosted another show, The Meltdown Pot, on University of Ottawa's campus radio station, CFUO-FM (in Ottawa). For CKAR, CKQT, and CHOO, he produced such shows as Durham Top 40, The Inside Track, The Rod Hunter Show, The Scottish Review, Continental Breakfast, Canadian Sunrise, and Canada Country, and also produced commercials. Badgley's Beatles radio program, Beatles Universe, was broadcast for four years on CKGE-FM (in Oshawa), and was later syndicated across North America. He then hosted the online radio show Backwards Traveler for two years on PerturbRadio. His current Canadian music-focused show, Here Today, is broadcast from Guelph's CFRU-FM.

Badgley has co-hosted several radio programs and podcasts with Tony Stuart, including The Stueytunes Show (RedCircle Podcast), The Way-Back Music Machine Podcast (RedCircle Podcast), The Way-Back Music Machine Radio Hour (Bombshell Radio / syndicated to CJNU-FM in Winnipeg, Manitoba and Rideau Lakes Radio in Westport, Ontario), Before My Time (Spotify Podcast), From Memphis to Merseyside (Bombshell Radio / syndicated to CHBB-FM in Norris Point, Newfoundland, CFAJ-AM in St. Catharines, Ontario, and Rideau Lakes Radio), and 8 Days This Week (Bombshell Radio / syndicated to CJNU-FM, CFAJ-AM, and Rideau Lakes Radio).

His contributions to All-Music Guide have appeared in four books co-published by All Media Guide and Backbeat Books: All Music Guide: The Definitive Guide to Popular Music (2001), All Music Guide to Electronica: The Definitive Guide to Electronic Music (2001), All Music Guide to Rock: The Definitive Guide to Rock, Pop, and Soul (2002), and All Music Guide to Country: The Definitive Guide to Country Music (2003); as well as in the liner notes of Splinter's Harder to Live reissue on Grey Scale (2017) and Big Country's Driving to Damascus box set reissue on Cherry Red Records (2023). Badgley's biography of George Harrison's record label Dark Horse Records, Dark Horse Records: The Story of George Harrison's Post-Beatles Record Label, was published in 2023 by Sonicbond Publishing. In promotion of this book, he was an invited guest at both 2024 events of The Fest for Beatles Fans (in New York City in March and in Chicago in August), as well as Toronto's The Word on the Street festival in September. In 2024, the book was selected for preservation into the Rock and Roll Hall of Fame and Museum's Library and Archives. Badgley is currently writing a book about Ringo Starr, as well as the biography of Canadian progressive rock band Klaatu.

== Books ==
- Boddanov, Vladimir; Woodstra, Chris; Erlewine, Stephen Thomas, eds. (2001). All Music Guide: The Definitive Guide to Popular Music (4th ed.). Ann Arbor, Michigan, United States: All Media Guide / Backbeat Books. ISBN 0-87930-627-0.
- Boddanov, Vladimir; Woodstra, Chris; Erlewine, Stephen Thomas; Bush, John, eds. (2001). All Music Guide to Electronica: The Definitive Guide to Electronic Music (1st ed.). Ann Arbor, Michigan, United States: All Media Guide / Backbeat Books. ISBN 0-87930-628-9.
- Boddanov, Vladimir; Woodstra, Chris; Erlewine, Stephen Thomas, eds. (2002). All Music Guide to Rock: The Definitive Guide to Rock, Pop, and Soul (3rd ed.). Ann Arbor, Michigan, United States: All Media Guide / Backbeat Books. ISBN 0-87930-653-X.
- Boddanov, Vladimir; Woodstra, Chris; Erlewine, Stephen Thomas, eds. (2003). All Music Guide to Country: The Definitive Guide to Country Music (2nd ed.). Ann Arbor, Michigan, United States: All Media Guide / Backbeat Books. ISBN 0-87930-760-9.
- Badgley, Aaron (2023). Dark Horse Records: The Story of George Harrison's Post-Beatles Record Label. Tewkesbury, Gloucestershire, United Kingdom: Sonicbond Publishing. ISBN 978-1-7-8952-287-7.
