= Black Rabbit (disambiguation) =

Black Rabbit is a television series starring Jude Law and Jason Bateman.

Black Rabbit may also refer to:

- Black Rabbit (Problem Children Are Coming from Another World, Aren't They?), a character from the light novel series, manga, and anime
- Black Rabbit of Inlé, a mythical character from the English novel Watership Down

== See also ==
- Black Rabbits, an album by Australian band Grinspoon
- Blac Rabbit, an American psychedelic rock band
  - Blac Rabbit (EP), debut extended play by the band
