= Rocky Harbour =

Rocky Harbour, or Rocky Harbor, may refer to:

- Rocky Harbour (Hong Kong), a harbour in the Hong Kong Special Administrative Region of China
- Rocky Harbour, Newfoundland and Labrador, a village on the island of Newfoundland, Canada
