= The Fest for Beatles Fans =

American music festival

- Poster for 2024 convention
- Status: Active
- Genre: The Beatles
- Frequency: Twice per year
- Locations: New York Metro area, Chicago
- Country: United States
- Inaugurated: September 1974
- Founder: Mark Lapidos
- Website: www.thefest.com

The Fest for Beatles Fans (previously known as Beatlefest) is a twice-annual, three-day festival that honors the lasting legacy of the Beatles. The festival takes place in the New York metropolitan area, ordinarily in March or April, and in Chicago, Illinois, each August. Running Friday through Sunday, the Fest features special guests, live concerts, exhibits, art contests, a Beatles marketplace, a sound-alike contest, a Battle of the Beatles Bands, and more.

== History ==
External image
- Cover of Rolling Stone, October 24, 1974

The Fest for Beatles Fans began in 1974 after founder Mark Lapidos ran the idea by John Lennon during an encounter at the Pierre Hotel in New York City. Lapidos asked Lennon for permission, to which Lennon replied, "I’m all for it! I’m a Beatles fan too!"

The first Fest, titled Beatlefest '74, took place over the weekend of 7-8 September 1974 at the Commodore Hotel in New York City. Over 8,000 Beatles fans attended. The event was supported by BBC TV and Apple Corps in London; both organisations supplied archive films and promotional clips, some of which had never been seen in the US. Each Beatle donated an item to be auctioned off for charity – guitars from Lennon and Paul McCartney, a table from George Harrison, and autographed drumsticks from Ringo Starr. Lennon considered attending, but decided not to because he was nervous about the crowd. May Pang, his girlfriend at the time, went in his place, with instructions to buy any interesting-looking memorabilia. Melody Maker journalist Chris Charlesworth helped Pang select items. Beatlefest '74 was recognized on the cover of Rolling Stone magazine.

Since its inception in 1974, the Fest has taken place every year in the New York Metropolitan area, except for the first two years of the COVID-19 pandemic. It has taken place in Chicago, Illinois, every year since 1977. The Fest has also taken place in Atlanta, Boston, Houston, Las Vegas, Los Angeles, Orlando, Philadelphia and San Francisco.

For the 60th anniversary of the Beatles landing in America at JFK airport, The Fest for Beatles Fans was held at the new TWA Hotel at JFK Airport, whose main public spaces are in the historic Eero Saarinen TWA flight Center where the Beatles landed.

Lapidos' 1977 application for a registered trademark on Beatlefest was granted by the United States Patent and Trademark Office in 1979. Nearly two decades later, it was challenged by Apple Corps in 1997 and ceded by Lapidos in 2002; thereafter, the name The Fest for Beatles Fans has been used.

== Events and activities ==
Among the events and activities at the Fest for Beatles Fans are nightly concerts by Beatles tribute band Liverpool, appearances and performances by various musical guests, photo exhibits, a Beatles museum and art contest, a Beatles sound-alike contest, the Battle of the Beatles Bands, panels and discussions with authors and Beatles experts, movie screenings, live auctions, puppet shows, and a Beatles marketplace. In 2014, the Fest included a bus trip to JFK Airport to commemorate the 50th anniversary of the Beatles' arrival in America.

== Past attendees ==
Since its inception in 1974, the Fest has hosted hundreds of special guests, including:

=== Musicians ===
- Randy Bachman, Canadian musician and founder of The Guess Who and Bachman–Turner Overdrive Bachman was also a part of Ringo Starr's 1992 All-Starr Band.
- Pete Best, drummer for the Beatles before being replaced by Ringo Starr
- Gregg Bissonette, drummer for Ringo Starr & His All-Starr Band
- Blac Rabbit, American psychedelic rock band who gained popularity covering Beatles music
- Glen Burtnik, performed with Beatlemania, Styx and the Orchestra; performs in Fest house band Liverpool
- Howie Casey, saxophonist for Tony Sheridan's Beat Brothers, Liverpool band Howie Casey & the Seniors, and Wings
- Chad & Jeremy, 1960s English folk rock duo
- Jon Cobert, Grammy Award-nominated pianist who performed with John Lennon
- Spencer Davis, leader and guitarist for the Spencer Davis Group
- Micky Dolenz, drummer and lead singer for the Monkees
- Donovan, Rock and Roll Hall of Famer
- Richie Havens, singer, guitarist, songwriter
- Greg Hawkes, keyboardist for the Cars, played keyboards for McCartney
- Steve Holley, Laurence Juber, Denny Laine, Henry McCullough, and Denny Seiwell – former members of Paul McCartney & Wings
- Jim Horn, saxophonist/flutist on solo recordings by all four Beatles
- Brett Hudson, vocalist, guitarist and bassist for the Hudson Brothers
- Mark Hudson, member of the Hudson Brothers, Ringo Starr's producer for ten years
- Neil Innes, musician for Bonzo Dog Doo-Dah Band, Monty Python and The Rutles, performed at the Concert for George
- Billy J. Kramer, 1960s pop singer who recorded several Lennon–McCartney songs
- Jackie Lomax, vocalist/guitarist for the Undertakers, original artist for Apple Records
- Gerry Marsden, leader of the British Merseybeat band, Gerry and the Pacemakers
- Mike McCartney, vocalist/writer for The Scaffold as Mike McGear, Paul McCartney's younger brother
- Delbert McClinton, singer/songwriter, taught John Lennon how to play blues harmonica
- Robbie McIntosh, guitarist for the Pretenders and the Paul McCartney backing band
- Ron McNeil, co-founder of Emmy-award winning tribute band The Fab Four
- Joey Molland, Mike Gibbins, guitarist and drummer for Apple Records band Badfinger
- Chris Montez, singer/musician, toured with the Beatles
- Harry Nilsson, singer-songwriter who was close with John Lennon and Ringo Starr. In 1982, Nilsson released an exclusive limited-edition single called "With a Bullet" at Beatlefest to raise money for gun control.
- Peter Noone, lead singer of Herman's Hermits
- Roy Orbison Jr., American musician and record producer
- David Peel, singer and Apple Records recording artist
- Mike Pender, founding member and lead vocalist for the Searchers
- Peter and Gordon (Peter Asher and Gordon Waller), who performed at Fest conventions together and separately
- Billy Preston, keyboardist who appeared on several Beatles tracks in the late 1960s
- The Quarrymen, a British skiffle/rock and roll group formed by Lennon which eventually evolved into the Beatles
- Mark Rivera, saxophonist who played with Lennon and toured with Ringo Starr and His All-Starr Band
- Tom Scott, saxophonist on solo recordings by Harrison, Starr and McCartney
- Tony Sheridan, singer-songwriter and guitarist who was an early collaborator with the Beatles
- Earl Slick, guitarist for New York Dolls, Phantom, Rocker & Slick, Silver Condor; sideman for the John Lennon and David Bowie "Fame" sessions
- The Smithereens, American rock band influenced by the Beatles who released two albums of Beatles covers
- Ronnie Spector, singer and former member of the Ronettes
- Hamish Stuart, guitarist for Average White Band and the Paul McCartney backing band
- Terry Sylvester, English guitarist/singer with The Escorts, The Swinging Blue Jeans and The Hollies
- Doris Troy, singer and Apple Records recording artist
- Lon & Derrek Van Eaton, singers/guitarists and brothers, Apple Records recording artists
- Klaus Voormann, met the Beatles in Hamburg in the early 1960s, designed the cover of Revolver, and played bass with Lennon as part of the Plastic Ono Band. He also recorded with Lennon, McCartney, Harrison and Starr.
- Alan White, drummer for John Lennon, George Harrison and Yes
- Andy White, drummer on "Love Me Do"
- Gary Wright, recorded with George Harrison and Ringo Starr, toured with the All-Starr Band
- Roy Young, piano player, Tony Sheridan's Beat Brothers, Cliff Bennett & The Rebel Rousers, Roy Young Band

=== Other guests ===
- Nancy Lee Andrews, former international model turned photographer, formerly engaged to Ringo Starr
- Aaron Badgley, music critic, radio host of Beatles Universe, and author of Dark Horse Records: The Story of George Harrison's Post-Beatles Record Label
- Tony Barrow, Beatles press officer who coined the phrase "The Fab Four"
- Sid Bernstein, booked The Beatles at Carnegie Hall and Shea Stadium
- Jenny Boyd, model, sister to Pattie Boyd, former wife of Mick Fleetwood
- Pattie Boyd, the former wife of George Harrison and Eric Clapton
- Al Brodax, producer of The Beatles TV series and the Yellow Submarine film
- Chris Carter, Los Angeles-based disc jockey who hosts Breakfast with the Beatles
- Alan Clayson, pop music historian who wrote a book on each Beatle
- Ray Coleman, biographer of Lennon and McCartney
- Ken Dashow, disc jockey at New York City's WAXQ "Q104.3" classic rock radio, Fest MC
- Jack Douglas, Grammy Award-winning record producer for Double Fantasy
- Geoff Emerick, engineer for the Beatles 1966–69, producer for Paul McCartney
- Bob Eubanks, before gaining fame as the host of The Newlywed Game, was a DJ who produced The Beatles performances at the Hollywood Bowl
- Prudence Farrow, author and film producer, subject of the Beatles song "Dear Prudence"
- Robert Freeman, photographer for four Beatles album covers
- Bob Gruen, photo–journalist and author
- Terri Hemmert, Chicago DJ at WXRT-FM, Fest MC in Chicago since 1978
- Larry Kane, Philadelphia television news anchor, the only American journalist to accompany the Beatles on their 1964–1965 American tours
- Freda Kelly, secretary for the Beatles and Epstein, president of the Beatles fan club
- Astrid Kirchherr, met the Beatles in Hamburg in the early 1960s, took early photographs of the group, and dated former bassist Stuart Sutcliffe
- Cynthia Lennon, John Lennon's first wife
- Martin Lewis, Beatles historian, Fest MC for over 20 years
- Mark Lewisohn, Beatles historian and author
- Ken Mansfield, former manager of Apple Records
- Bruce Morrow, American radio personality known to many listeners as Cousin Brucie
- Jack Oliver, former President of Apple Records (1969-1971)
- May Pang attended the first Beatlefest where she purchased a photograph that became the cover of Lennon's Rock 'n' Roll album
- Alan Parsons, engineer for the Beatles 1969–70, musician, leader of the Alan Parsons Project
- Paul Saltzman, film and TV producer/director, joined the Beatles in India
- Ken Scott, Beatles engineer 1967-69
- Norman Smith, Beatles engineer 1962–65, record producer, singer, premiered his memoir at the March 2007 convention
- Victor Spinetti, Welsh actor who appeared in the Beatles films A Hard Day's Night, Help! and Magical Mystery Tour. He also appeared in the video for the 1978 Wings song “London Town”.
- Bruce Spizer, Beatles historian and author
- Alistair Taylor, personal assistant of Beatles' manager Brian Epstein, General Manager of Apple Corps
- Vivek Tiwary, author of the graphic novel The Fifth Beatle about Epstein
- Kenneth Womack, Beatles historian and biographer of record producer George Martin
