= Bun Bei Chau =

Small island in Sai Kung District, Hong Kong

Coordinates: 22.336538°N 114.367839°E

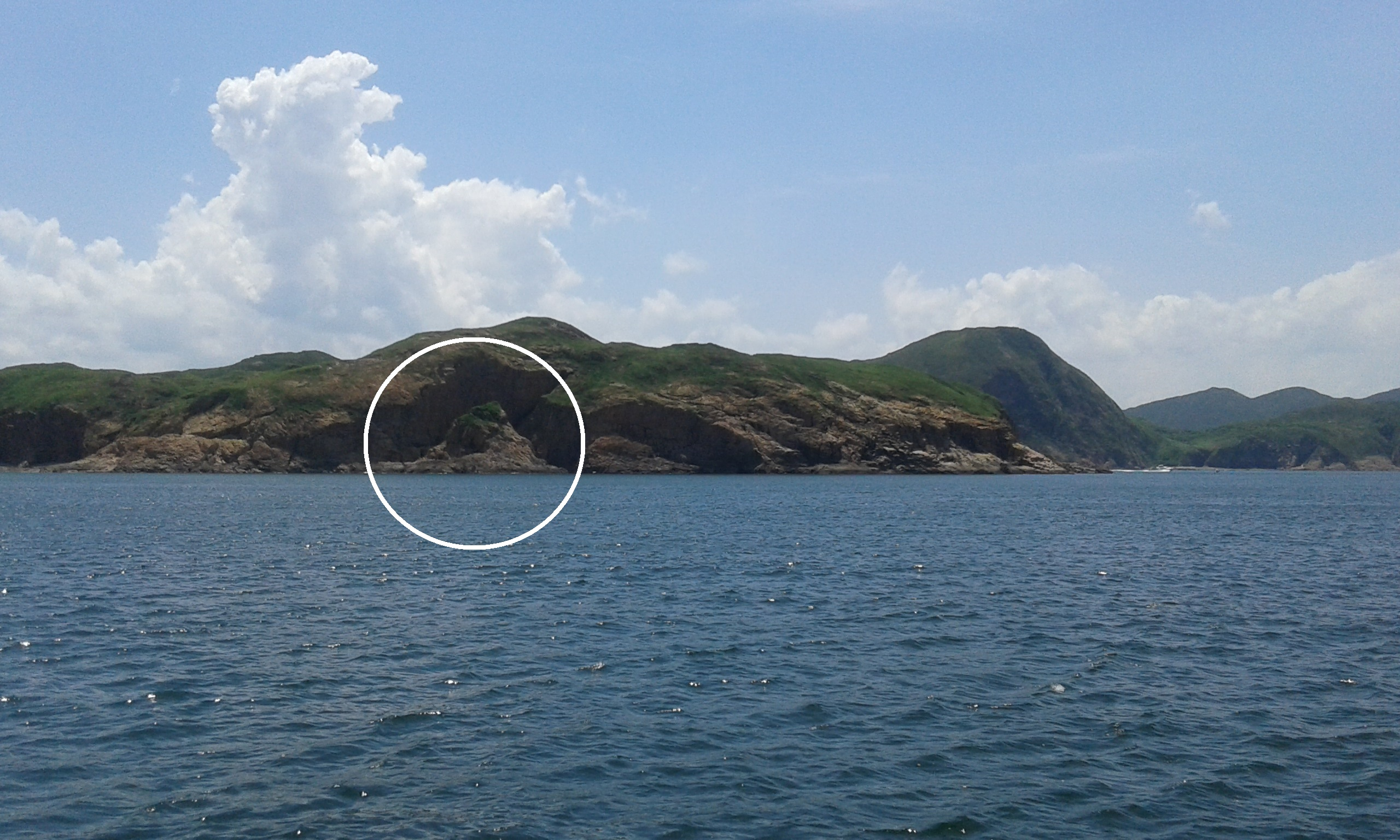
View of the northwestern coast of Town Island. Bun Bei Chau is highlighted.

Bun Bei Chau (Chinese: 崩鼻洲) is a small island in Sai Kung District, Hong Kong. It is located just off the northeast coast of Town Island near Rocky Harbour.
