= Dark Horse Records: The Story of George Harrison's Post-Beatles Record Label =

2023 book by Aaron Badgley

- Author: Aaron Badgley
- Language: English
- Subject: Dark Horse Records
- Genre: Biography
- Publisher: Sonicbond
- Publication date: December 8, 2023
- Publication place: United Kingdom
- Media type: Print, paperback
- Pages: 208
- ISBN: 978-1-789-52287-7
- OCLC: 1378931942
- Website: www.sonicbondpublishing.co.uk/other-books/dark-horse-records

Dark Horse Records: The Story of George Harrison's Post-Beatles Record Label is a biography of George Harrison's record label Dark Horse Records by Canadian music journalist, broadcaster, and The Beatles historian Aaron Badgley. It was published by British publisher Sonicbond Publishing on December 8, 2023, in the United Kingdom and Europe, and on January 24, 2024, in North America.

== Background ==
As a music journalist and critic, Aaron Badgley has written for such publications as All-Music Guide, The Fulcrum, The Spill Magazine, Lexicon Magazine, Immersive Audio Album, WA12Radio, the Anderson Collegiate Vocational Institute student newspaper, and several Beatles fan magazines, including Strawberry Fields Forever, Beatlefan, and Good Day Sunshine Magazine. He also hosted a Beatles radio program, Beatles Universe, on CKGE-FM in Oshawa, Ontario, Canada, which was later syndicated across North America. Badgley's review of Splinter's Harder to Live (originally released by Dark Horse Records) for All-Music Guide was used in the liner notes of the album's reissue by Grey Scale Records in 2017.

After interviewing Beatles researcher Kenneth Womack for a The Spill Magazine feature in 2017, Womack encouraged Badgley to write a Beatles-related book. Badgley was a long-time collector and admirer of George Harrison's record label Dark Horse Records, and after further discussing the company's lack of documentation with Womack, Badgley began working on a detailed biography in book form in 2018, spending three years on the project. He started his research by exploring Splinter, which was the record label's first signing, and interviewing its members. Badgley also conducted extensive interviews with nearly all members of the bands signed to Dark Horse Records and session musicians who played on the albums. He also spoke with some of the artists' managers, as well as former employees and executives of A&M Records, which initially financed, distributed, and promoted Dark Horse Records.

Discussing his motivation behind the book with Ted Woloshyn on the Ted Woloshyn Podcast in 2024, Badgley stated "I've read a lot of Beatles books, hundreds, and when they talk about George Harrison's career, they tend to go: All Things Must Pass, Living in the Material World, and then it's like he disappears until Cloud Nine in the '80s. And it was far from the truth, he did a lot in the '70s and '80s. One of the things he did was this label and I was always fascinated by this whole Dark Horse label, given that he, initially, was not even on his own record label - he was promoting other bands. It was a really diverse label. It was just an incredible label. And no one's written a book about it. I always wanted to read about it, I wanted to learn about it, so I thought maybe I'll write the book." He told Gerrod Harris during an interview for his podcast Beats By Ger that he was influenced by the documentative work collected in the book All Together Now: The First Complete Beatles Discography 1961–1975 by Harry Castleman and Walter J. Podrazik. He also shared, when interviewed by Angie and Ruth McCartney on their podcast TeaFlix, that he used to go to A&M Records' Canadian office in Scarborough, Ontario as a child, where he would receive free promotional records of Dark Horse Records' releases from friendly employees.

== Release and promotion ==
The book was announced on May 20, 2023, and originally scheduled for release by British publisher Sonicbond Publishing on September 28, 2023, but it was delayed by three months. It was finally released on December 8, 2023, in the United Kingdom and Europe, and on January 24, 2024, in North America. A book-launch party was held at the Dead Dog Records record store in Toronto, Ontario on March 2, 2024.

In promotion of the book, Badgley was an invited guest at both 2024 events of The Fest for Beatles Fans (in New York City in February, and in Chicago in August), as well as at Toronto's The Word on the Street festival (in September). In 2024, the book was selected for preservation into the Rock and Roll Hall of Fame and Museum's Library and Archives.

== Content ==
The book begins with Harrison's work at Apple Records and his motivation for starting his own company, Dark Horse Records, in 1974. It covers the bands Harrison took with him from Apple to Dark Horse and the work he did as a producer and session musician for the artists he released, including Ravi Shankar, Splinter, Attitudes, The Stairsteps, Keni Burke, Henry McCullough, and Jiva.

It also details the financing and distribution deals the record label had with A&M Records, then with Warner Bros. Records, and later with Capitol Records, along with Harrison's solo recording and touring career through Dark Horse Records. The last portion of the book covers the record company's revival by Harrison's widow, Olivia Harrison, and their son, Dhani Harrison, the distribution deals made with EMI, Universal Music Group, and BMG, and the signing of Joe Strummer, Cat Stevens, Billy Idol, Leon Russel, and Jon Lord.

Badgley's first draft was close to 500 pages but he edited it down to around 300 pages. In the final manuscript submitted to the publisher, Badgley had written reviews for every Dark Horse Records album and single, but Sonicbond Publishing cut them to bring the book down to around 200 pages. In an interview conducted for It's Psychedelic Baby! Magazine, Badgley explained that a couple of early publishers that originally showed interest in the book ultimately rejected it because the content did not include enough gossip about Harrison's personal life - a choice the author made deliberately in order to keep the focus on the record company. He also told Mike Kennedy of SleeveNotes that "one publisher that I spoke to before the book was published said 'we'll publish it if you can put more in about his addictions and divorce,' and I said that's not what I'm writing about." Badgley made sure that everything that was included in the book could be backed up with proof, omitting rumors and hearsay.

== Reception ==
Nigel Pearce on his Future Radio show Groove Britain called it "a splendid book" and "a fascinating insight." Alexander Julien of It's Psychedelic Baby! Magazine praised the book, writing it was "so enjoyable and informative that I read it through in just two days." For Record Collector, Daryl Easlea wrote, "Aaron Badgley pieces the history together with great detail, proving that Dark Horse was much more than the few paragraphs it is usually allowed in a Harrison biography, and as such [the book] is a fascinating addition to the Beatles bookshelf." During the Things We Said Today video podcast, Ken Michaels said "I don't think there's ever been a book just on this [record label], which makes it even more exciting." On the same broadcast, Allan Kozinn added "It's got tons of fascinating stuff in it. It's an area that even in Harrison bios there's a little about it, but they don't go into the depth that Aaron has."

Joe Wisbey of Beatles Books said "Dark Horse Records is one of those things that lots of Beatles fans know existed, but that's about where their knowledge ends. [This book] is brilliant at telling the story of the label and the acts that appeared on it. Aaron tells the story of this varying bunch of artists and we find out why the label wasn't quite the success that Harrison had hoped for." On his Ted Woloshyn Podcast, broadcaster Ted Woloshyn said "Aaron Badgley has written a fabulous book" and "just when you think you know everything about The Beatles, out comes another book and you think, wow, there's even more." He ended the broadcast with "For anybody who is a Beatles fan, or even if you're just a bit of a Beatles fan, or if you're a music fan at all, I highly recommend you pick up [the book]. It is as fascinating as the group itself."

Writing for The Vinyl District, Steve Matteo said: "This is the first time a book has focused on the record label of one of The Beatles as a solo artist. This book perfectly balances covering Harrison’s solo albums on Dark Horse and the work of other artists who recorded for the label." He added, "There is no question that this is the definitive book on Dark Horse Records and a significant and singular addition to the growing history of George Harrison as a man, a musician, and even a businessman." Mike Kennedy of SleeveNotes said "One thing that impressed me particularity about the book is there's no sensationalism in there, there's no gossip in there. It draws you in just through the human interest and the facts that [Badgley] presents and the great amount of people that [Badgley] got to talk to as well."

Gerrod Harris of The Spill Magazine wrote "Badgley has sought to provide a detailed account of a different side of Harrison, one we often forget about when remembering the singer, songwriter, and guitarist." He said of the author "Badgley separates himself from most authors through a unique tone that is both well sourced and with the enthusiasm of a superfan" and that he had "set his sights on Harrison the producer and label executive in a compelling way." He also wrote that the book is "an incredibly well researched deep dive into Harrison’s life in the ‘70s and beyond" and that it was "a passionate read." He finished his review by stating that the book "is a Beatles book unlike any other out there and will prove to be a must read for fans of the band, Harrison, and ‘70s popular music alike."

Writing for The Rider, Glenda Fordham offered "This is the first book to discuss Harrison’s label in such detail. This book is like reading the intimate diary of George Harrison’s life in music, his recording label, his collaborations and lifelong friendships with other trailblazing artists whose music is still played and appreciated today." She added, "At the back of the book, there are pages and pages of reference works and a bibliography so extensive, one can only imagine the hours, days, weeks, months Badgley put in to research for his book."

Reviewing the book for Meet the Beatles for Real, Sara Schmidt wrote "If you ever wanted to learn about George Harrison's Dark Horse label, then [this book] by Aaron Badgley is the book for you. If you are a George Harrison fan, this is a must-read book. If you are interested in how the record business worked in the 1970s, you'd be interested in it as well." She praised the book as "very well-researched and interesting" and stated that Badgley "goes through all the ups and downs of Dark Horse with A&M and Warner Bros. He also examines in depth each of the artists signed to the label, the singles released, and all of George's solo albums from 1974 to today."

Martin Burns of DPRP called the work "well written" and noted that Badgley is a "Beatles obsessive with a more than passing interest in how record companies work." He added, "The main issue for the label was distribution and Badgley goes extensively into how this works between established record companies and independents and focuses on the labyrinth of business and legal matters."
