= Amiri and Rahiem Taylor =

American musicians

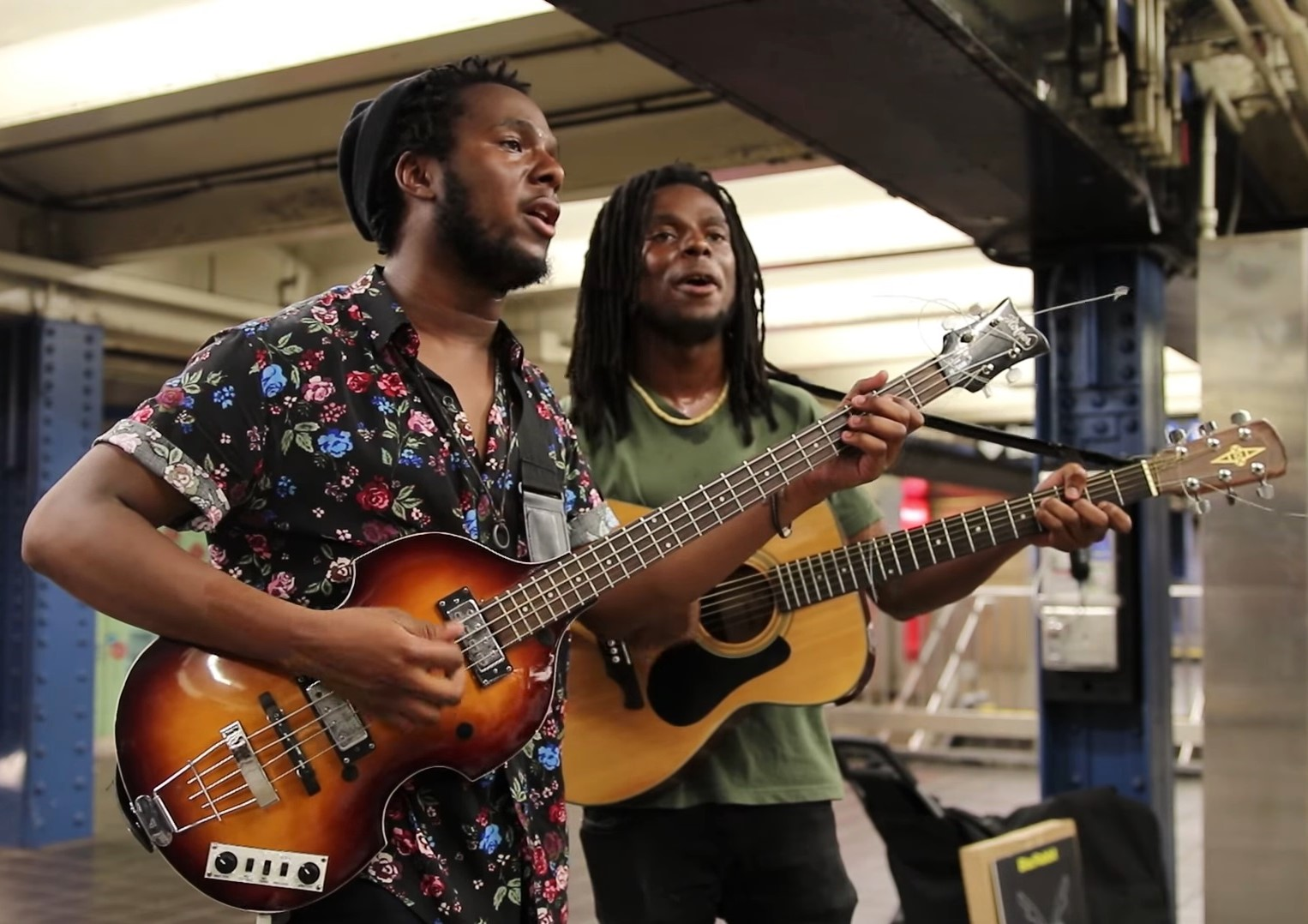
- The Taylors sing in the New York City subway in 2017

Background information
- Born: 1994 or 1995 (age 31–32); Bedford–Stuyvesant, Brooklyn, New York, U.S.
- Genres: Psychedelic rock
- Occupation: Singer-songwriters
- Instruments: Vocals; guitar; bass

Amiri and Rahiem Taylor (born c. 1994) are American singer-songwriters. They lead the psychedelic rock band Blac Rabbit and are identical twin brothers.

The Taylors were raised in Bedford–Stuyvesant, Brooklyn, and learned to play instruments in imitation of the Beatles. After high school they formed Blac Rabbit, recruiting a drummer and bassist, and eventually left supermarket jobs. They became known for Beatles covers on New York City Subway stations with voices said to closely resemble John Lennon and Paul McCartney's harmonies.

== Early life ==
Amiri and Rahiem Taylor are identical twins, born in Bedford–Stuyvesant, Brooklyn, New York City, in the mid-1990s. They grew up around their grandfather's jazz and their grandmother's Beatles records. Despite being surrounded by hip hop music in Brooklyn, they were influenced more by the pop, funk, and soul of the 1960s and 1980s.

In high school they were introduced to playing guitar through the video game The Beatles: Rock Band, a Christmas gift from their grandmother. From there they started emulating the Beatles by watching recordings of them; they call the Lennon–McCartney partnership "arguably the greatest songwriting duo of all time".

== Career ==
They began composing original music after they learned how to play Beatles songs on actual instruments. Originally a hobby, their music evolved and "eventually turned into a band". Shortly after graduating from high school in the early 2010s, they met drummer Patrick Jones at an open mic in Brooklyn. Keeping in contact, they formed a band which became the psychedelic rock group Blac Rabbit. The band released the self-titled EP Blac Rabbit in December 2017.

The Taylors' first street performance was to raise enough money to visit their mother in Puerto Rico. They earned fare for round-trip plane tickets, about $400, within two days. After some time working in supermarkets and being prompted by their family to enroll in college, they began busking full-time, five or six times a week. "For us, it was music or die," Raheim said. In the New York City Subway, their regular performing locations became the Times Square, Herald Square, and Delancy Street stations. "Busking definitely sharpened our skills in terms of performing," Rahiem later said.

Cell-phone recordings of the Taylors' street performances have garnered hundred of thousands of views online. On January 26, 2018, New York Nico filmed them singing the Beatles' "Eight Days a Week" and released the video on his Instagram account. In March 2018, his recording was posted to Twitter and received 58 thousand retweets and three million views; the attention increased Blac Rabbit's Twitter follower count 33-fold. "Now in the subway they recognize us much more," they told La Voz del Interior.

Soon after they received greater online publicity, several fans began petitioning for them to go on The Ellen DeGeneres Show. They appeared on the program on March 22, 2018. Before playing "Eight Days a Week", they told the host about their delight in seeing reactions to their Beatles covers: "When we play, usually people are expecting Bob Marley or Stevie Wonder or something," Amiri said. Rahiem added, "It's cool to break people's expectations and to see their faces. A lot of people walk from around the corner and they just hear the music. Then, they see us and they're like, 'Whoa, really?'" After their performance, DeGeneres gifted them guitars and amplifiers; they had mentioned that they lost a guitar at a subway station. Jones and Lugo joined them on the show to play a cover of the Tame Impala song "Solitude Is Bliss".

As of March 2018, they reside together in Far Rockaway, Queens. They went on several tours with Blac Rabbit throughout 2018.

== Musical style ==
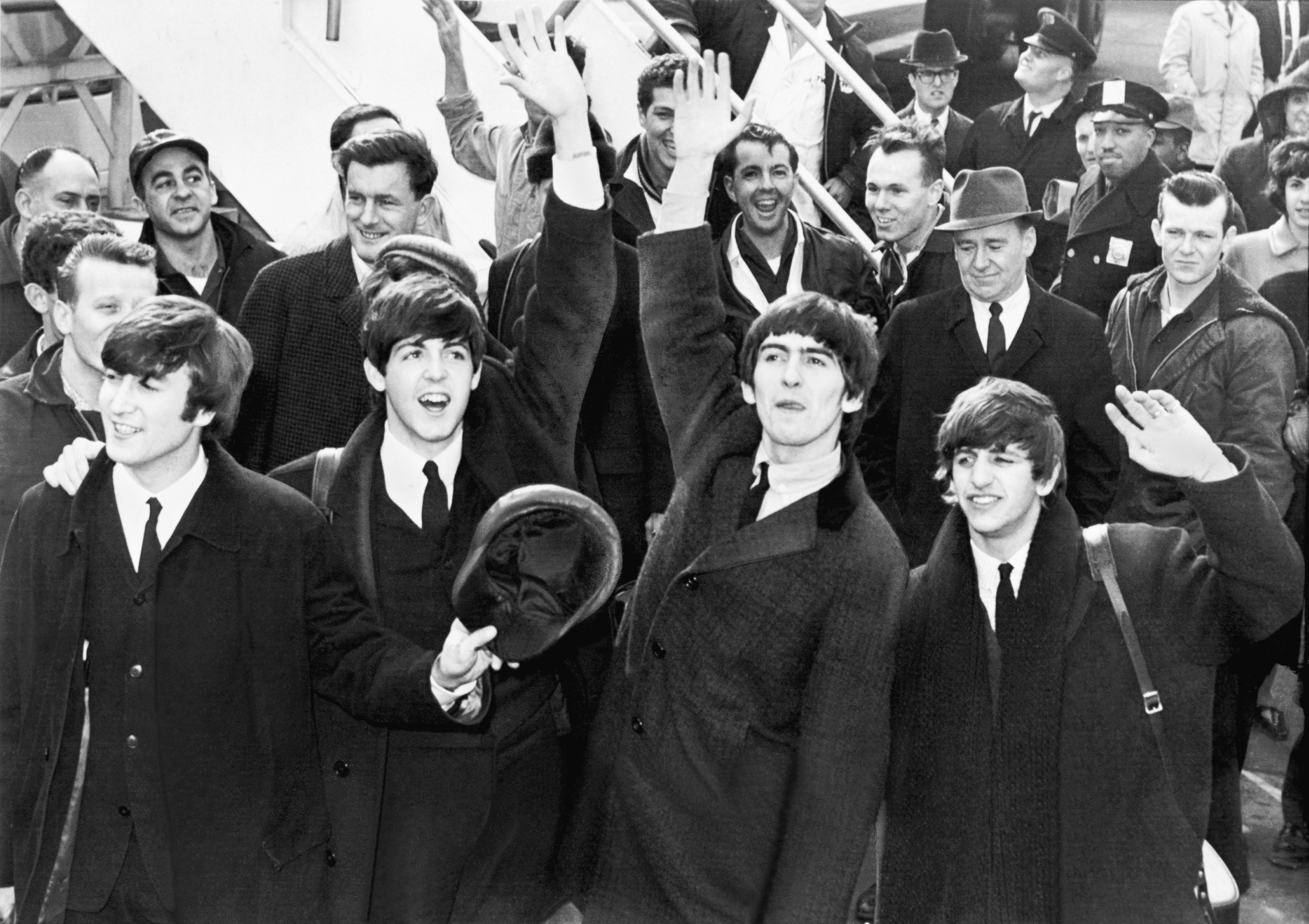
The Beatles arriving at Kennedy Airport in 1964

The Taylor brothers rose to prominence with their covers of Beatles song in the New York City Subway. Singing in harmony and accompanied by acoustic guitar and amplified bass, they according to several writers sound so similar to the original artists that "you could close your eyes and mistake them for Lennon and McCartney". Some listeners once asked if their vocals were prerecorded, and they responded, "[We] wish we had the tech to dub ourselves out there!"

Compared to his brother, Rahiem says that he is "the tech nerd" and "the mixing guy", being drawn to audio mixing and engineering more than Amiri, "the songwriting guy", who "has developed a great ear for chords". Artists the twins credit as influences (besides the Beatles) include Tame Impala, Radiohead, Toro y Moi, Mac DeMarco, the Police, Talk Talk, and Michael Jackson. The music of Blac Rabbit, their psychedelic rock band, incorporates elements of funk, surf music, and psychedelia. With the band, they perform both Beatles covers and original songs.
