= Nam Fung Chau =

Island of Hong Kong

Native name: 南風洲
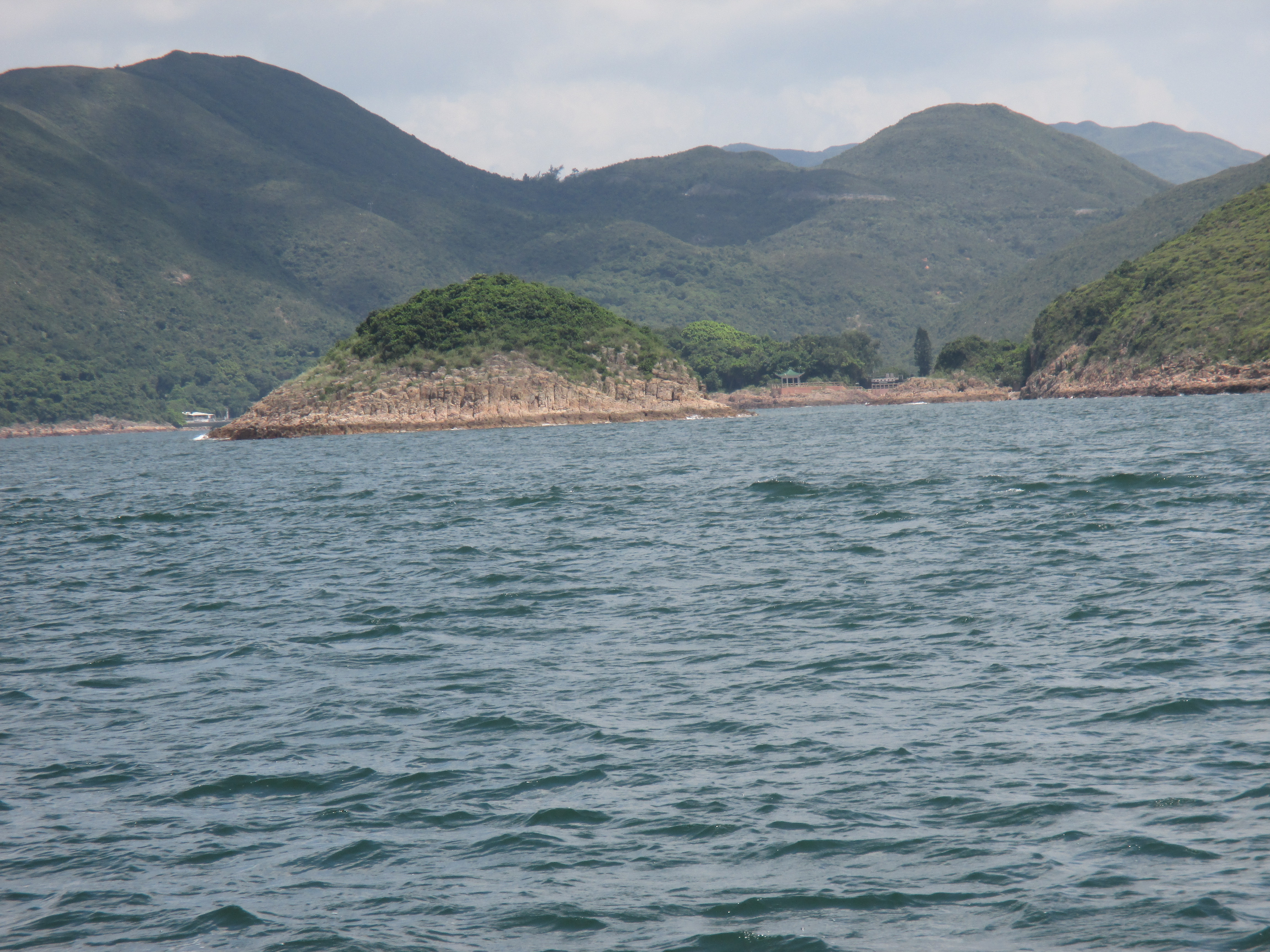
- The islet of Nam Fung Chau is visible in the centre left. The land in the background is the southwestern coast of High Island, a former island of Hong Kong.

- Location within Hong Kong

Geography
- Coordinates: 22.342300°N 114.351792°E

Administration
- Hong Kong
- Districts: Sai Kung District

Nam Fung Chau (Chinese: 南風洲), also called Green Island, is an island of Hong Kong, under the administration of Sai Kung District. It is located in Rocky Harbour (糧船灣海, Leung Shuen Wan Hoi), off the coast of High Island.

The island has a maximal elevation of 15 m.
