= Norris Point =

Norris Point North Point
- Town
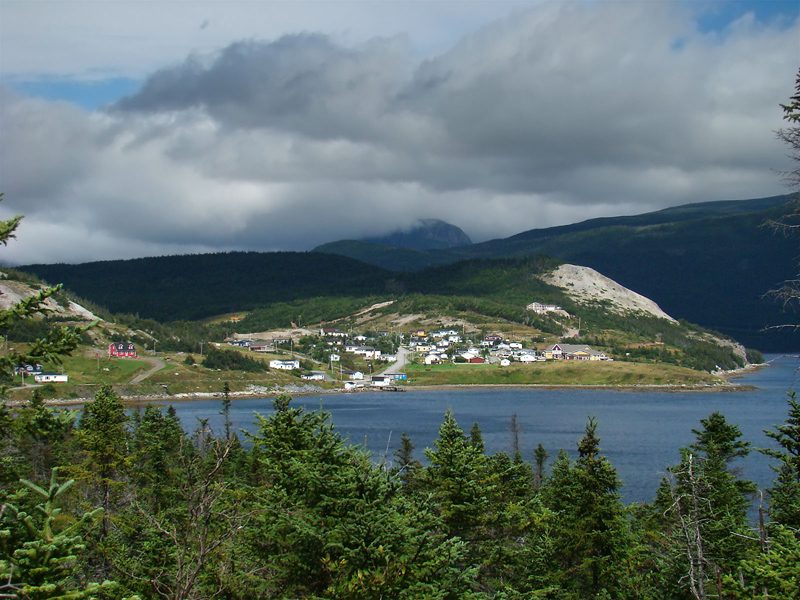
- View from the Burnt Hill Hiking Trail

- Location of Norris Point in Newfoundland
- Coordinates: 49°31′10″N 57°52′21″W
- Country: Canada
- Province: Newfoundland and Labrador

Population (2021)
  - Total: 602
- Time zone: UTC-3:30 (Newfoundland Time)
  - Summer (DST): UTC-2:30 (Newfoundland Daylight)
- Area code: 709

Norris Point is a community in the Canadian province of Newfoundland and Labrador.

Located on the northern peninsula of Newfoundland and 10 minutes south of Rocky Harbour, the community hosts a marine biology centre, a pharmacy, a modern health care facility, and several businesses. The community is adjacent to Gros Morne National Park.

Norris Point is located on the northern side of Bonne Bay and is named after one of its first settlers, Neddy Norris, who came to the area with his wife and children between 1789 and 1790. The Norrises apparently disappeared or left the area; consequently, there is no official account of their residency. The radio station CHBB-FM is broadcast from Norris Point and also serves Bonne Bay.

== Demographics ==
In the 2021 Census of Population conducted by Statistics Canada, Norris Point had a population of 602 living in 263 of its 351 total private dwellings, a change of −10.1% from its 2016 population of 670. With a land area of 4.84 km^{2} (1.87 sq mi), it had a population density of 124.4/km^{2} (322.1/sq mi) in 2021.
