= CHBB-FM =

Coordinates: 49.5286°N 57.8819°W

- Norris Point, Newfoundland and Labrador; Canada
- Broadcast area: Gros Morne National Park, Bonne Bay
- Frequency: 95.9 MHz
- Branding: The Voice of Bonne Bay

Programming
- Format: Community radio

Ownership
- Owner: Bonne Bay Cottage Hospital Heritage Corporation

History
- Call sign meaning: Bonne Bay (broadcast area)

Technical information
- Class: LP
- ERP: 30 watts (vertical polarization only)
- HAAT: 41 metres (135 ft)
- Repeater: CHRH-FM 98.1 MHz Rocky Harbour

Links
- Website: vobb.org

CHBB-FM, is a Canadian radio station, which broadcasts a community radio format at 95.9 MHz in Norris Point, Newfoundland and Labrador.

Owned by the Bonne Bay Cottage Hospital Heritage Corporation, the station received CRTC approval on November 4, 2009.

On September 12, 2012, Bonne Bay Cottage Hospital Heritage Corporation received CRTC approval to add a new FM transmitter in Rocky Harbour, which operates on 98.1 MHz. Bonne Bay stated that the topography of the region interferes with its signal in Rocky Harbour and that the addition of a rebroadcasting transmitter is necessary for it to adequately serve that community.
