= Rocky Harbour (Hong Kong) =

Harbour at the south-east of Sai Kung Peninsula, Hong Kong

Coordinates: 22°20′36.57″N 114°20′16.89″E

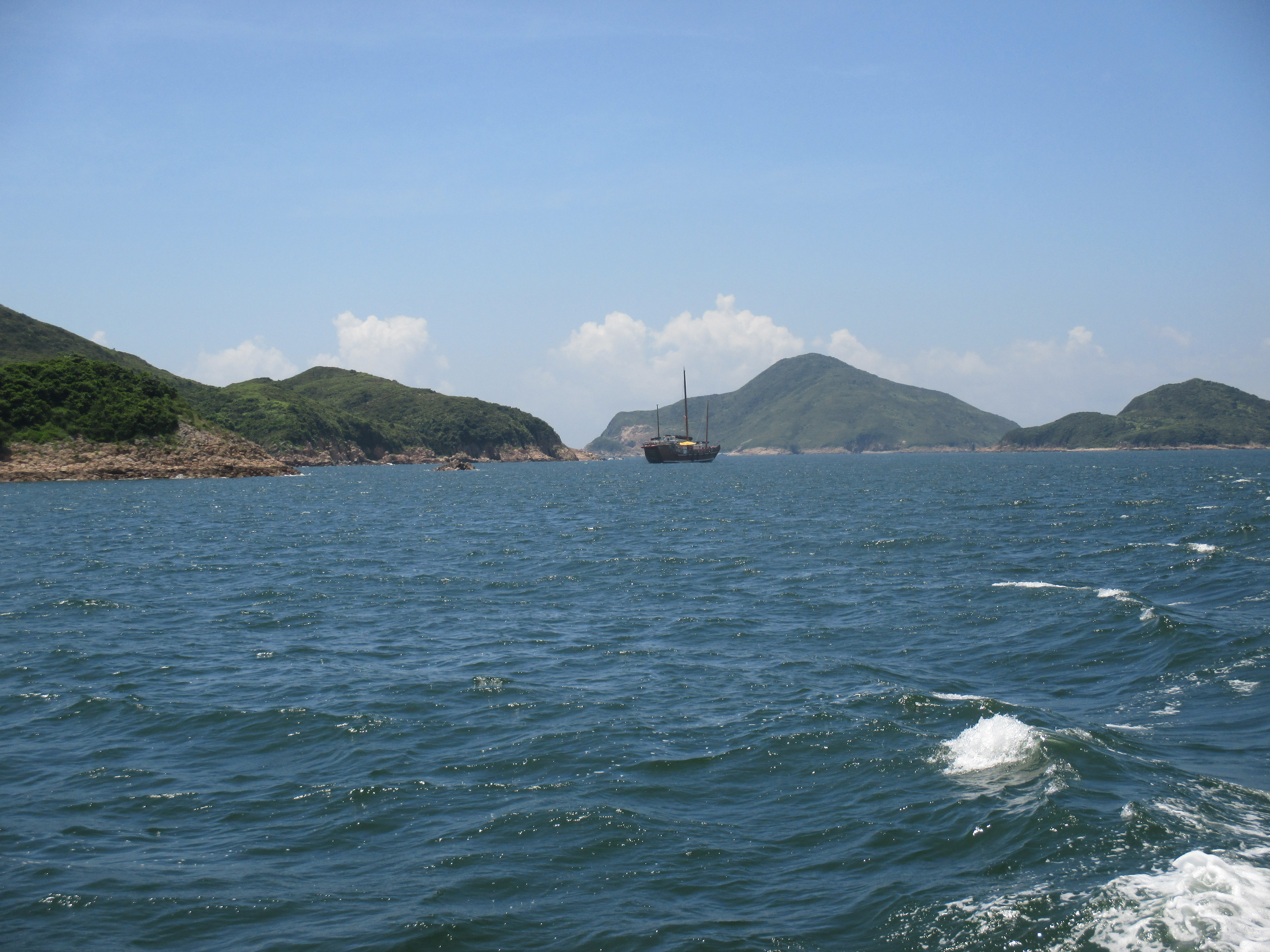
View of Rocky Harbour. From left to right: High Island, Basalt Island, Bluff Island.

Rocky Harbour or Leung Shuen Wan Hoi (Chinese: 糧船灣海; lit. 'the sea of the bay of food vessels') is a harbour at the south-east of Sai Kung Peninsula, Hong Kong.

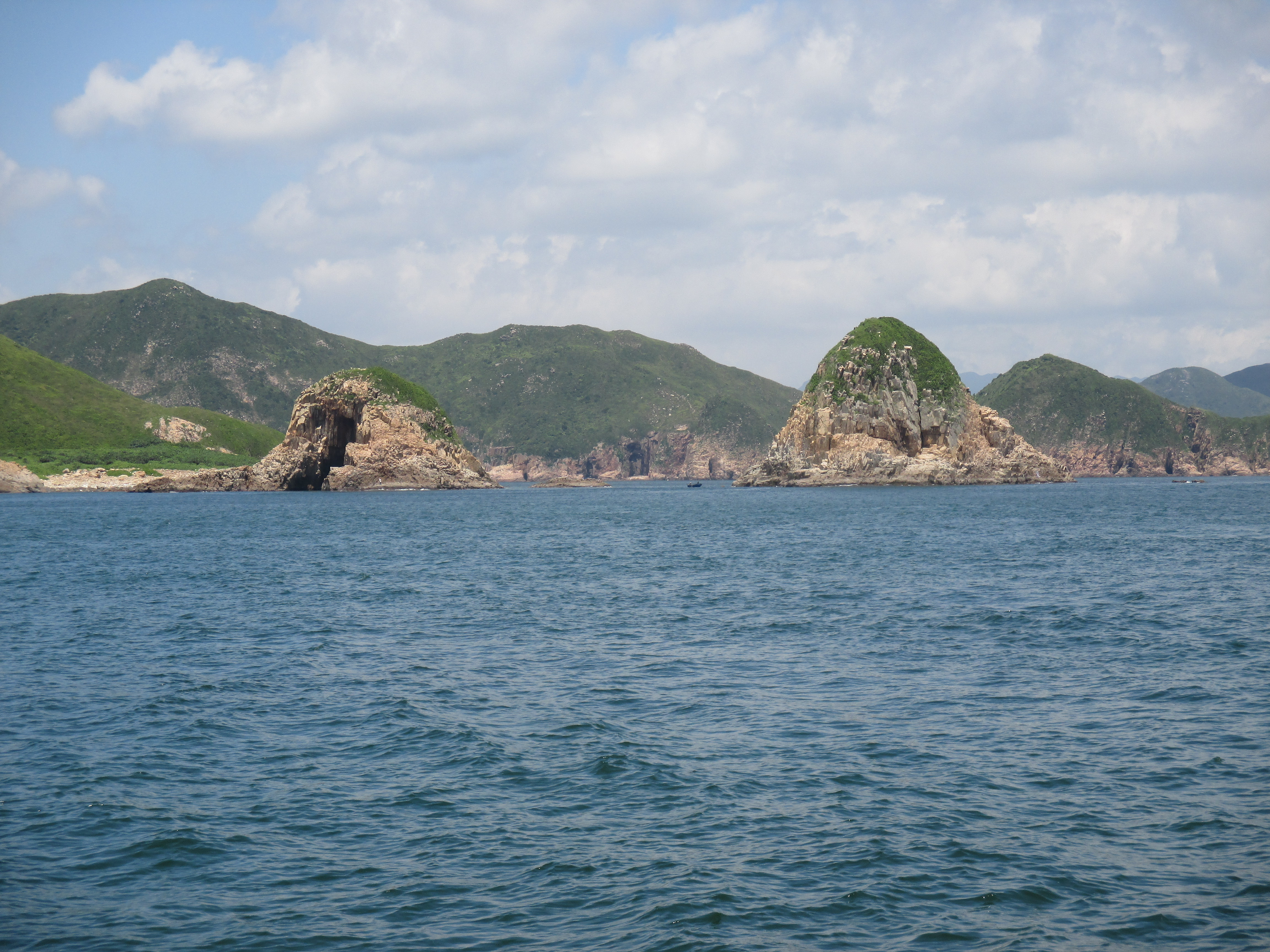
Pyramid Rock (on the right), within Rocky Harbour, Sai Kung District, Hong Kong. The land on the left is part of Basalt Island, and the one in the back is part of Bluff Island.

== Islands ==
Several islands are hugging the harbour. It is adjacent to the former island of Leung Shuen Wan, also known as High Island.

List of islands

- Basalt Island (火石洲)
- Bay Islet (匙洲)
- Bluff Island (沙塘口山)
- Bun Bei Chau (崩鼻洲)
- Cham Pai (沉排)
- Chau Tsai (洲仔)
- Kong Tau Pai (光頭排)
- Lung Shuen Pai (龍船排)
- Ma Tsai Pai (孖仔排)
- Nam Fung Chau (南風洲)
- Pin Chau (扁洲)
- Po Yue Pai (蒲魚排)
- Pyramid Rock (尖柱石)
- Sam Pai (三排)
- Tai Pai (大排)
- Tong Hau Pai (塘口排)
- Town Island (伙頭墳洲)
- Tung Sam Chau (棟心洲)
- Wai Kap Pai (桅夾排)
- Wang Chau (橫洲)
- Wong Nai Chau (黃泥洲)
- Yi Pai (二排)
- Yuen Kong Chau (圓崗洲)
