= Blac Rabbit (EP) =

EP by Blac Rabbit
- Released: December 22, 2017
- Studio: Private residences Rockaway, Queens, New York, U.S.
- Genre: Psychedelic rock
- Length: 24:52
- Label: How Far Music

Blac Rabbit is the debut extended play (EP) by American psychedelic rock band Blac Rabbit. It was released digitally by How Far Music on December 22, 2017. Inspired by the Beatles and Tame Impala, it was recorded in the homes of band members and the band's manager. Amiri Taylor wrote five of the songs on the EP, while his twin brother and co-frontman Rahiem wrote a sixth and handled audio mixing.

== Background and production ==
Psychedelic rock band Blac Rabbit of Rockaway Beach, Queens, New York City, is fronted by twins Amiri and Rahiem Taylor and backed by drummer Patrick Jones and bassist Josh Lugo. The band often covers songs by the Beatles, which it cites as a major inspiration. On October 31, 2016, demo versions of two Blac Rabbit songs were published online: "All Good", itself released as a single earlier in the year, and "Mind Space".

The group's first release with How Far Music, Blac Rabbit, followed the next year, several months before a cellphone recording of the Taylors' cover of a Beatles song went viral online. The EP was recorded and mixed at the Taylors' house and at their How Far Music manager's house in Rockaway Beach. Rahiem Taylor handled mixing for the Blac Rabbit EP; it was mastered by Lino Martinez. Rahiem later explained that on the EP, the main guitar effects came from Zoom G2 and G3 effects pedals, specifically applying compression to raise the mid-range tone; delay and reverb for a "washe[d] ... ghostly" sound; and vibrato, slightly warping the pitch. The cover art shows the band's logo, an outline drawing of a rabbit, superimposed on "vibrant swirls of bright indigo, orange and red".

Well after the EP was released, Blac Rabbit recorded live in studio versions of six songs with the record label Audiotree on June 21, 2018, including three from Blac Rabbit—"Mindspace", "All Good", and "Over the Rainbow"—as well as new songs "Seize the Day", "Rooftops", and "I'm Your Last". Also at Audiotree, Rahiem Taylor said that some of the new songs were to be included on an album titled Interstella yet to be recorded.

In October 2018, while recording the follow-up album to the EP, Rahiem said "our tastes have developed" since Blac Rabbit, which "was kind of a test run". He said the experience of "experimenting with some gear at home" gave the band a better idea of "what we wanted going into this [new] project".

== Composition and songs ==
The Blac Rabbit EP contains six songs. The opener, "All Good", is described as a "sunsoaked" and "lazy day, day-dreamy track" with "delightful Beatles-inspired melodies". A lively tune, its "chugging" psychedelic guitar riffs change as the song progresses. The next song, "Over the Rainbow", is based on several hooks. It draws more inspiration from funk than the EP's other compositions, though it is still based in surf music and psychedelia.

"Closer to the Sun", inspired by Tame Impala, contains vocals notably processed with echo and reverberation. The song "speeds up and slows down in all the right places," wrote Olivia D'Orazio, "and treads the fine line between stripped-down-and-raw and all-the-bells-and-whistles." She called it the song that "definitely ... sets Blac Rabbit apart from its competition."

As Nicole Moore put it, in the instrumentation of "The Way the Wind Whips", each part "freely breathes in the mix, with a very cymbal-heavy drum beat occupying the high end of the track, guitars in the mids, and basses in the lows".

The only song not composed by Amiri Taylor for the EP is "Mindspace", written and recorded by Rahiem. The EP's longest song, it alternates between variations on only two chords. The final track, "I Don't Mind if You're Around", layers a psychedelic base with "breezy" hooks. Like with "Mindspace", the song is a part where "the garage band opens up and lets their psychedelic tendencies loose".

== Critical reception ==
D'Orazio called Blac Rabbit "the exact psychedelic dream that we needed to start 2018 off right", while Nathan Leigh found it "destined to be a soundtrack to summer" and "the uplift we've all been waiting for". Moore wrote that Blac Rabbit had "mastered mixing" since "everything is right where it needs to be", referring to the audio levels in the mix.

Moore said she was "hooked on the aesthetic the band had drawn up" in the cover art even before listening and was "very pleased with this project". Yet she found unresolved "the question of identity", as "Blac Rabbit seems to think of themselves as tied around their influences' little finger". She asked, "Will Blac Rabbit become Blac Rabbit, or will Blac Rabbit live as nothing more than a Beatles/Tame Impala impression?"

== Track listing ==
Adapted from album liner notes.

All tracks are written by Amiri Taylor, except where noted.

No.	Title	Length
1.	"All Good"	4:18
2.	"Over the Rainbow"	3:26
3.	"Mindspace" (written by Rahiem Taylor)	5:20
4.	"Closer to the Sun"	2:52
5.	"The Way the Wind Whips"	4:31
6.	"I Don't Mind if You're Around"	4:25
Total length:		24:52

== Personnel ==
Adapted from album liner notes.

- Kiyan Hagan – album art
- Patrick Jones – drums (tracks 2, 4)
- Lino Martinez – mastering (all tracks)
- Amiri Taylor – bass (tracks 1–2, 5–6), guitar (1–2, 4–6), vocals (1–2, 4–6)
- Rahiem Taylor – bass (tracks 3–4), drums (1, 3, 5–6), guitar (1, 3), mixing (all), vocals (3)

== Release history ==
List of release dates, showing region, format(s), label(s), and reference(s)
Region	Date	Format(s)	Label(s)	Ref.
Various	December 22, 2017	Digital download	How Far Music	
Various	December 29, 2017	Streaming	How Far Music	
Various	Unknown	Compact disc	How Far Music	
