= Anderson Collegiate Vocational Institute =

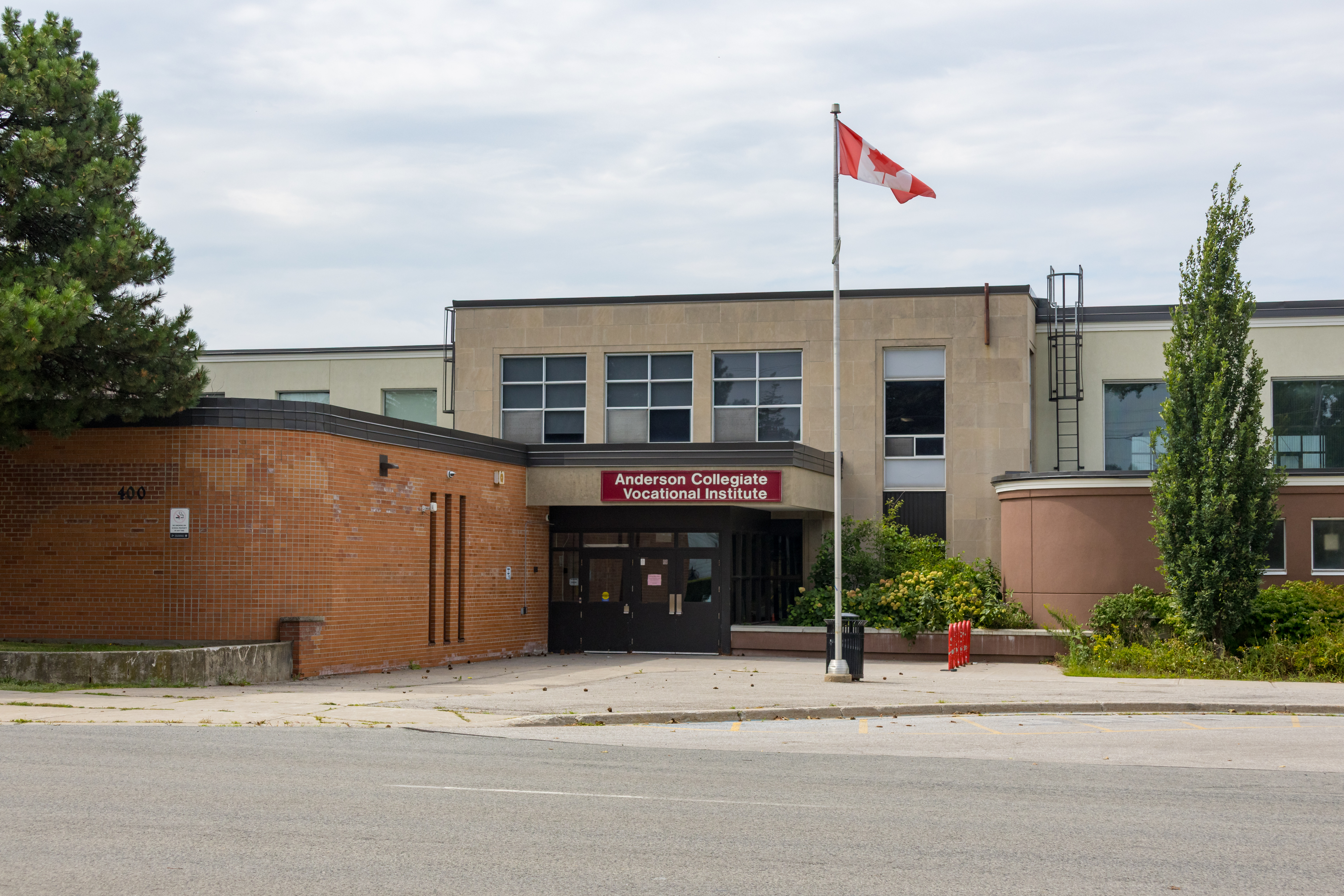
- Anderson CVI in 2026

Location
- 400 Anderson Street; Whitby, Ontario, L1N 3V6; Canada; 43°53′15″N 78°55′28″W

Information
- School type: Public Secondary School
- Motto: Scientia crescat, vita colatur (Latin) (English: "Increase knowledge, enrich life")
- Founded: 1960
- School board: Durham District School Board
- Area trustee: Michelle Arseneault; Tracy Brown; Christine Thatcher
- School number: 882025
- Principal: Cheryl Rock
- Vice Principals: Senthuran Paramasamy; Dorothy Lai
- Grades: 9-12
- Enrolment: 1200 (2025/2026)
- Language: English
- Colours: Red and Grey
- Mascot: Raider
- Website: http://ddsb.ca/school/andersoncvi/

Anderson Collegiate Vocational Institute (Anderson CVI, Anderson Collegiate, Anderson, or ACVI) is located in Whitby, Ontario within the Durham District School Board. Established in 1960, the school has students in grades 9–12 and offers a wide range of academic and extracurricular activities. Anderson is the only high school in Whitby that offers the gifted program and thus acts as a magnet school, attracting students across the municipality. This program provides an enriched and accelerated curriculum for students in specific courses from grades 9–11. Anderson's feeder elementary schools are Bellwood Public School, C. E. Broughton Public School, Dr. Robert Thornton Public School, Julie Payette Public School, John Dryden public school, Pringle Creek Public School (regular and gifted), and Jack Miner Public School (gifted only).

In 2007, then Principal John Morrison was named one of Canada's Outstanding Principals.

== Notable alumni ==
- Aaron Badgley – music journalist
- A. J. Cook – actress
- Christine Elliott – politician
- Sandy Hawley – jockey
- K-os – musician
- Andrew "Test" Martin - wrestler
- Lori Melien – Olympian
- Dyshawn Pierre – basketball player
- Keith Primeau – professional hockey player
- Wayne Primeau – professional hockey player

== See also ==
- Education in Ontario
- List of secondary schools in Ontario
