= Blac Rabbit =

American psychedelic rock band

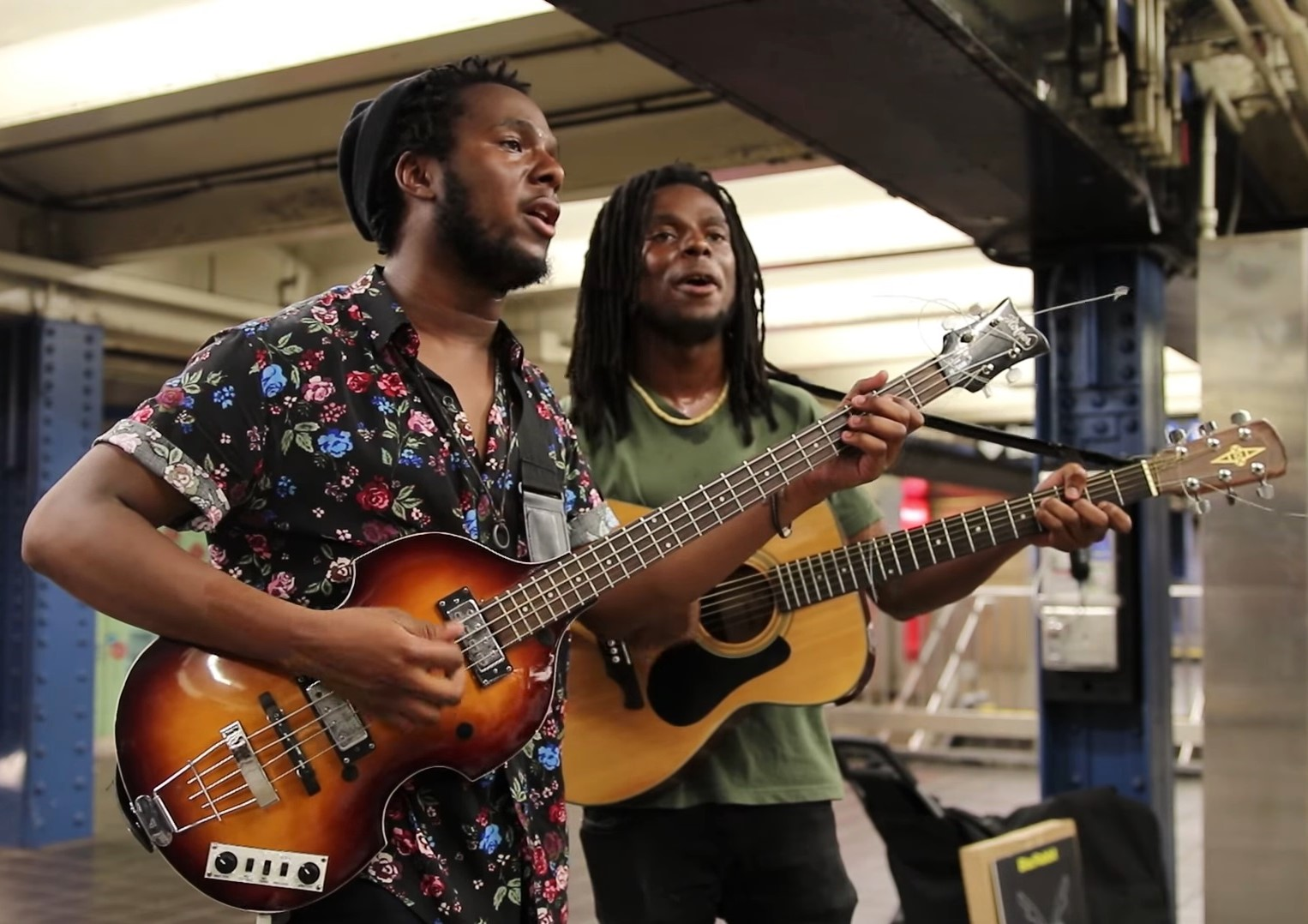
- Amiri and Rahiem Taylor perform in the New York City subway in 2017

Background information
- Origin: Rockaway Beach, Queens, New York, U.S.
- Genres: Psychedelic rock
- Years active: c. 2013–present
- Labels: N/A
- Members: Amiri Taylor; Rahiem Taylor; Patrick Jones; Frank Corr; Michael Meneses
- Website: www.blacrabbit.com

Blac Rabbit is an American psychedelic rock band based in Rockaway Beach, Queens, New York City. It is led by twin brothers, songwriters, singers, and guitarists Amiri and Rahiem Taylor, and backed by Patrick Starr (drums), Frank Corr (bass), and Michael Meneses (keyboards). The band has released one self-titled EP. Their first full-length album, Interstella, was released on March 8, 2022.

== History ==
=== 2013-2018: Early beginnings and Blac Rabbit EP ===
Around 2013, identical twin brothers Amiri and Rahiem Taylor met Patrick "Sticks" Jones at an open mic at a Sam Ash Music store in Brooklyn, New York City. All recent high-school graduates, the trio formed Blac Rabbit—they say the name Black Rabbit was already taken. The Taylors are known for covering the Beatles on the New York City Subway, and they left supermarket jobs and put off college to pursue music full-time. Bassist and occasional guitarist Josh Lugo joined later. The band is based in Rockaway Beach, Queens, New York City.

Blac Rabbit digitally released the song "All Good" as a single in June 2016. The song was later included on their six-track debut extended play (EP), self-titled Blac Rabbit, which How Far Music released digitally on December 22, 2017. A CD later became available on Bandcamp. The EP was recorded in the Taylors' and their manager's houses and mixed by Rahiem. As critic Olivia D'Orazio writes, "Hazy guitar riffs and rumbling bass are steadfast throughout the EP, and the echoey vocals whisk you from one song to another."

A recording of the Taylors playing the Beatles' "Eight Days a Week" received 3 million views on Twitter and 14 million on Facebook in February 2018. The viral online recognition increased the number of the band's Twitter followers from around 500 to 16,700 in two days. The band had to update its website due to traffic spurred by the 48-second video.

With more exposure, the band were able to perform outside the subway with bookings in music venues, eventually playing festivals in Berlin and Guatemala as well as New York City's Bowery Ballroom and the Knitting Factory. They also covered the Beatles' "Michelle" for a Gucci advertisement featuring Harry Styles. From June 15 to July 3, 2018, the band went on a 16-date tour of the East Coast. On early tour dates far from New York City, Rahiem later recalled, some audiences who had only seen the Taylors' Ellen appearance thought they were a cover band and asked for Beatles tunes, which they did sometimes use to end sets. Amiri said their toughest crowd was in Montreal, where the audience had put on a "game face".

On September 13, Blac Rabbit was the musical act at an event to promote the John Lennon Educational Tour Bus in New York City recreating the 1969 Bed-In For Peace. The band performed "Give Peace a Chance" alongside speakers including Yoko Ono, Ringo Starr, actor Jeff Bridges, and New York mayor Bill de Blasio; "it was so surreal in person," Amiri said. The Seize the Day Tour, Blac Rabbit's second concert tour of 2018, ran October 23 to November 10. It was followed by a tour of Europe and the United Kingdom, ending on December 3 at the Beatles Story and The Cavern Club in Liverpool. Summarizing their ascent from busking in the subway and "playing for audience of barely anyone" to booking larger venues and festivals, Amiri said: "I was scared ... All of that happened in one rush and it was just overnight."

=== 2018-present: Interstella ===
In 2018, the Taylors announced a new Blac Rabbit record titled Interstella., with its first single, "Seize the Day", being released on November 21, followed by "Windy Cities" on May 10, 2019. During the next year, keyboardist Justin Jagbir joined the band, playing with the band during the Interstella North America Tour from April 2 to May 18.

On the day of the 92nd Academy Awards in 2020, Blac Rabbit played Beatles covers at Charles Finch and Chanel's pre-Oscar party at the Polo Lounge in Beverly Hills. Later that month (February 2020), the band launched a Kickstarter campaign for the Interstella album release.

On March 8, 2022, Interstella was finally released on all streaming platforms, preceded by the singles "Hey Hey" and "Gave It Away".

== Musical style ==
The Taylors describe their original music as psychedelic rock, influenced by the Beatles, Radiohead, 1980s music, and contemporaries MGMT, Tame Impala, and Toro y Moi. Rahiem has said: "We just want to make wholesome, melodic, digestible but also very intelligent, deep, thought-provoking music," and he has noted the difficulty in balancing their love of the Beatles with forming Blac Rabbit's own identity. The band performs both Beatles covers and original songs with a "vintage" sound.

Afropunk contributor Erin White wrote, "Their music has all of the positivity and optimism of an LSD trip with none of the existential dread." According to José Heinz of La Voz del Interior, the band is "as indebted to the sounds of the '60s as to this era's New York scene". The band's EP fuses surf and psychedelic music, with some tracks tinged by funk. The Taylors' vocals, doused with reverb, have drawn comparison to those of Tame Impala.

== Discography ==
=== Studio albums ===
List of studio albums
Title	Album details
Interstella	Released: March 8, 2022; Label: Self-released; Format: digital download, streaming

=== Extended plays ===
List of extended plays
Title	EP details
Blac Rabbit	Released: December 22, 2017; Label: How Far Music; Format: CD, digital download, streaming
Blac Rabbit on Audiotree Live	Released: July 12, 2018; Label: How Far Music; Format: Digital download, streaming

=== Singles ===
List of singles as lead artist
Title	Year	Album
"Seize the Day"	2018	Interstella
"Windy Cities"	2019	Interstella
