= Town Island =

Island in Hong Kong

Coordinates: 22°20′4.51″N 114°21′53.32″E

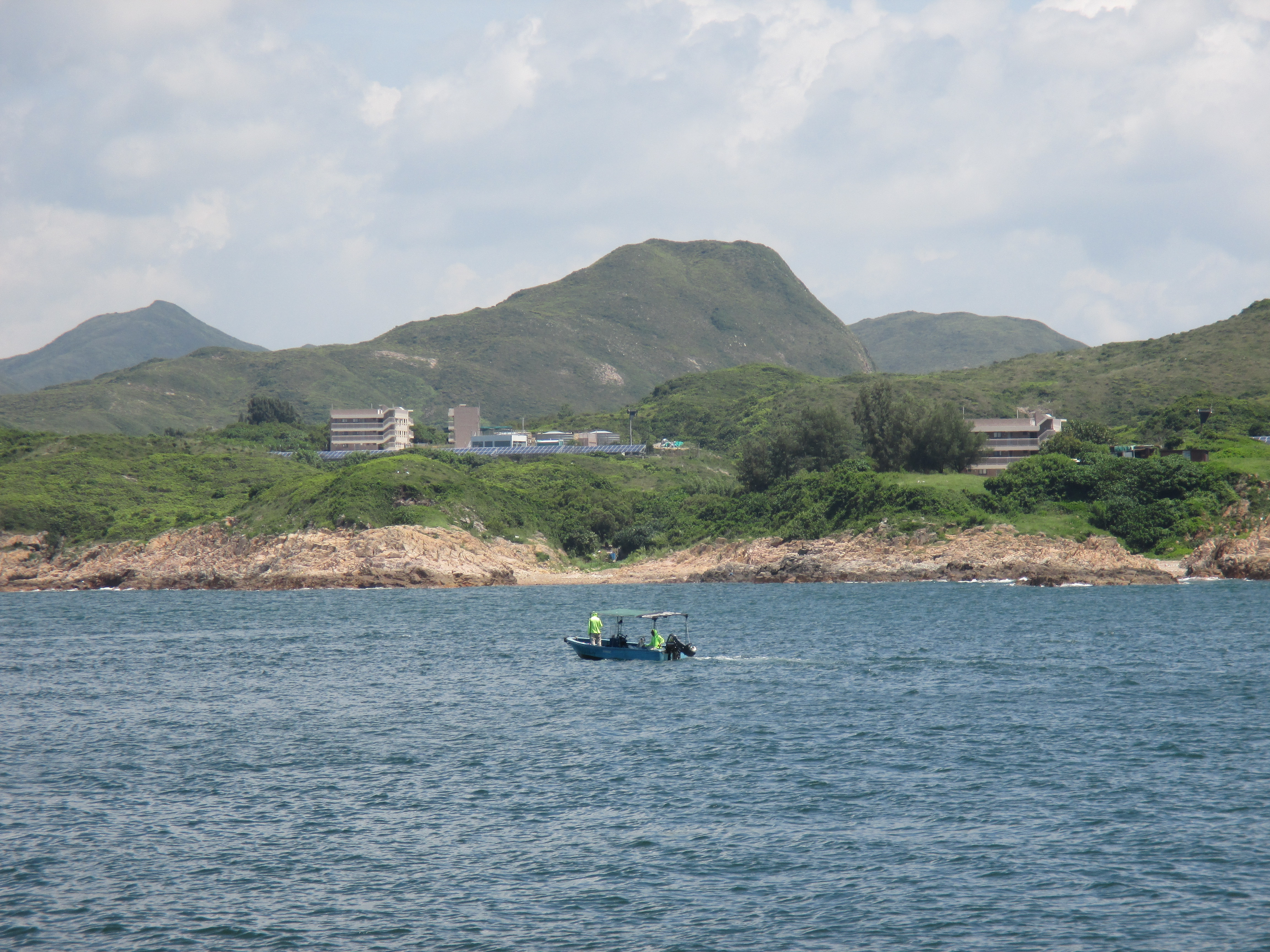
Town Island, viewed from the south.

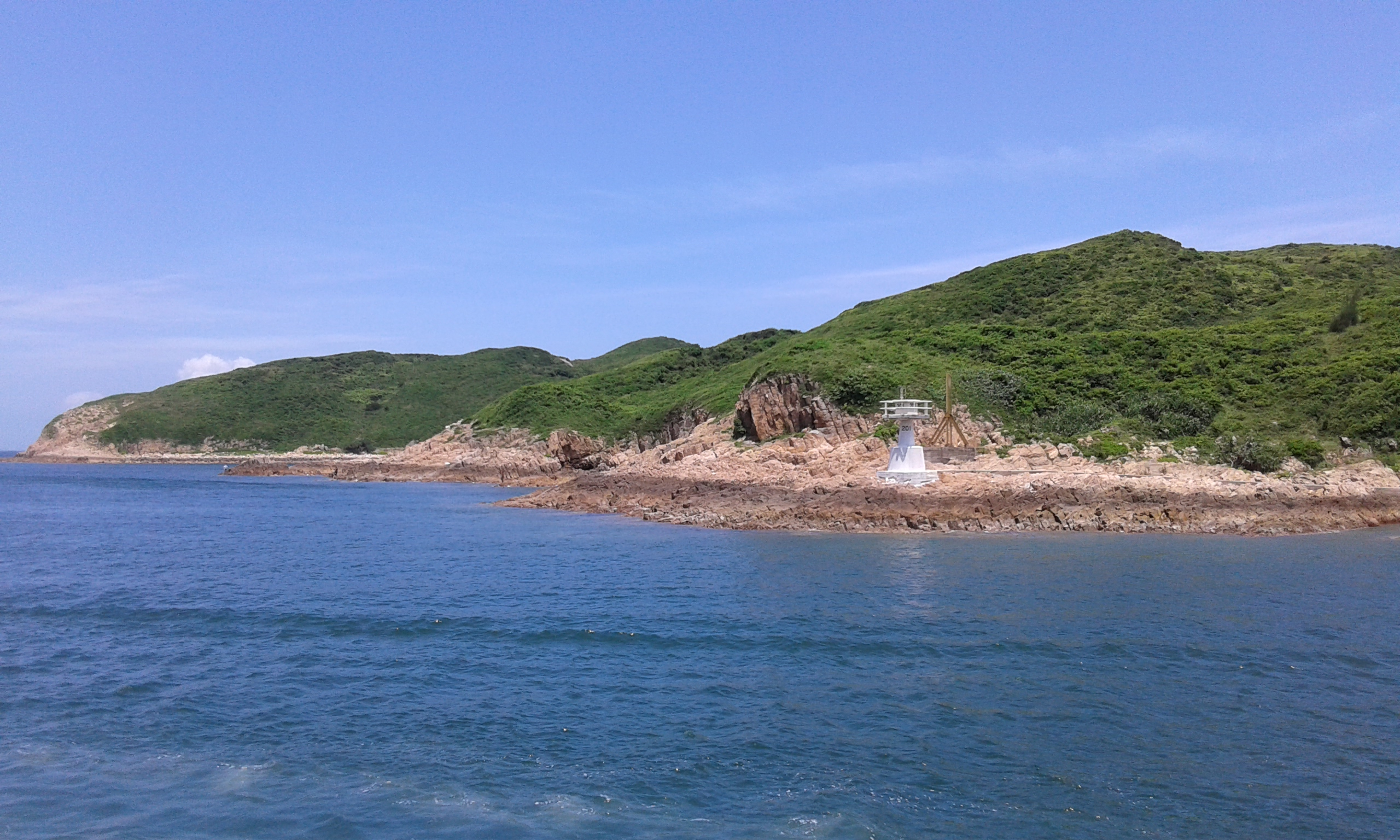
Lighthouse at the northwestern corner of Town Island.

Town Island (Chinese: 伙頭墳洲, Fo Tau Fan Chau), also known as Dawn Island is an island in the New Territories of Hong Kong. It is located south of the former High Island, in the Sai Kung District of the territory.

A drug rehabilitation centre was established on the island in 1976. It is run by Operation Dawn.

The electricity for the island is supplied from photovoltaic panels by CLP Group.

The island is served by a ferry route from Sai Kung twice a day, except public holidays.

== See also ==
- List of islands and peninsulas of Hong Kong
