= Rocky Harbour, Newfoundland and Labrador =

Rocky Harbour Small Bay, Little Harbour
- Town
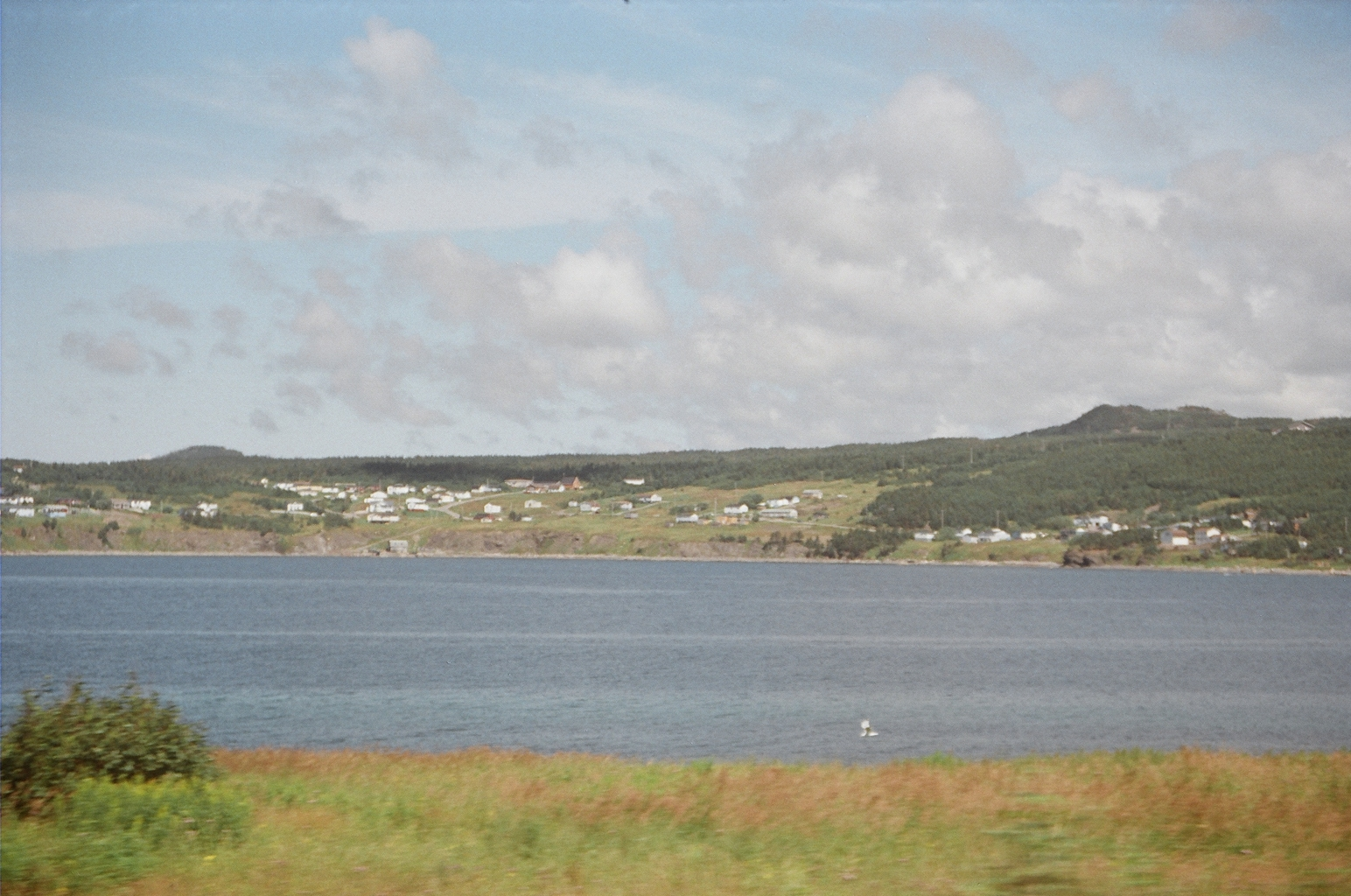

- Location of Rocky Harbour in Newfoundland
- Coordinates: 49°35′40″N 57°55′10″W
- Country: Canada
- Province: Newfoundland and Labrador
- Incorporated: 1966

Population (2021)
  - Total: 937
- Time zone: UTC-3:30 (Newfoundland Time Zone)
  - Summer (DST): UTC-2:30 (Newfoundland Daylight)
- Area code: 709
- Highways: Route 430
- Website: www.rockyharbour.ca

Rocky Harbour is a town located on the western edge of Newfoundland, near the entrance to Bonne Bay. The harbour was previously known as Small Bay or Little Harbour. This town is home to Gros Morne National Park, a World Heritage Site.

== History ==
Arrowheads show that Mi'kmaw once inhabited the area. During the 18th and 19th centuries, the harbour was frequented by the early French fisherman when it came under the French Shore fishery. The first year Rocky Harbour appeared in the census figures was in 1874, when it had a population of 35.

A post office was established there in 1900. It became a Local Government Community in April 1966. Following the opening of Gros Morne National Park in 1973, the population further increased and services such as an RCMP detachment were added. It had a population of 357 in 1921. In 2011, the population was 979.

Rocky Harbour is a key tourist town in central Gros Morne National Park. It offers nature and scenery viewing, and access to hiking trails. The town's only school, Gros Morne Academy, is also home to the Rocky Harbour Public Library. Neighbouring communities include Norris Point and Neddie's Harbour. Rocky Harbour has two exits from Newfoundland and Labrador Route 431.

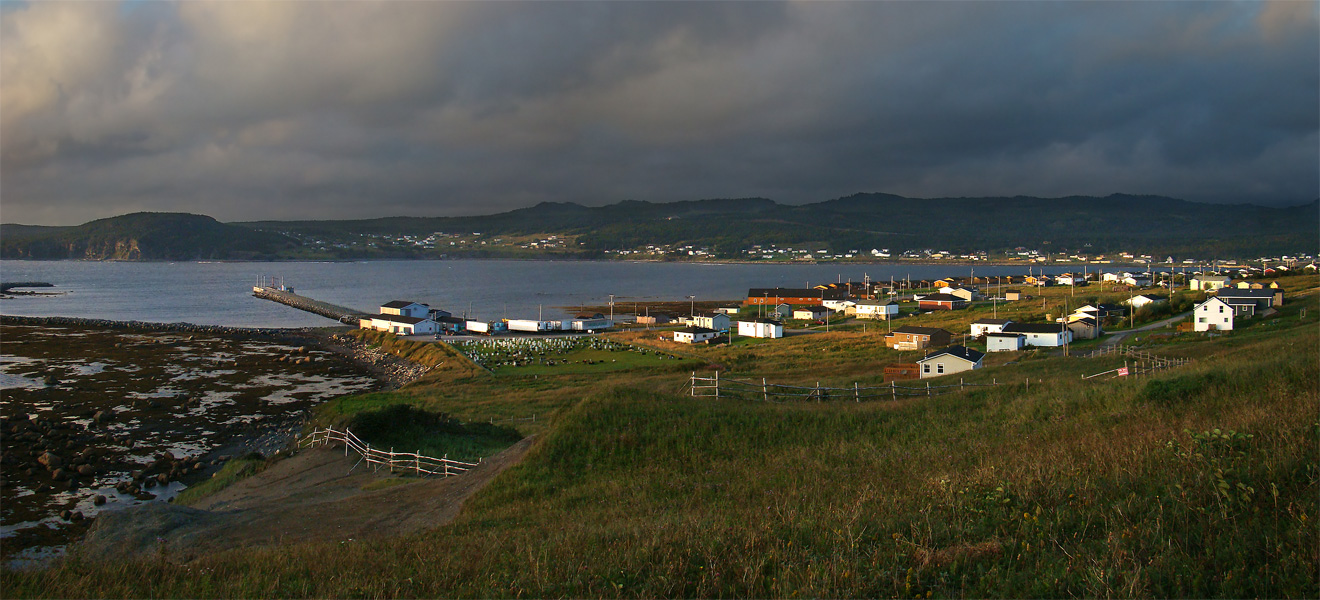
Rocky Harbour at sunset

== Demographics ==
In the 2021 Census of Population conducted by Statistics Canada, Rocky Harbour had a population of 937 living in 436 of its 556 total private dwellings, a change of −1.1% from its 2016 population of 947. With a land area of 12.08 km^{2} (4.66 sq mi), it had a population density of 77.6/km^{2} (200.9/sq mi) in 2021.

== Transport ==
The town does not have it own airport. The nearest airport is Deer Lake Regional Airport, located 71 km (44 mi) south east, the airport provides direct routes to other parts of Canada including to Toronto, Montreal and St. John's.

== Gallery ==
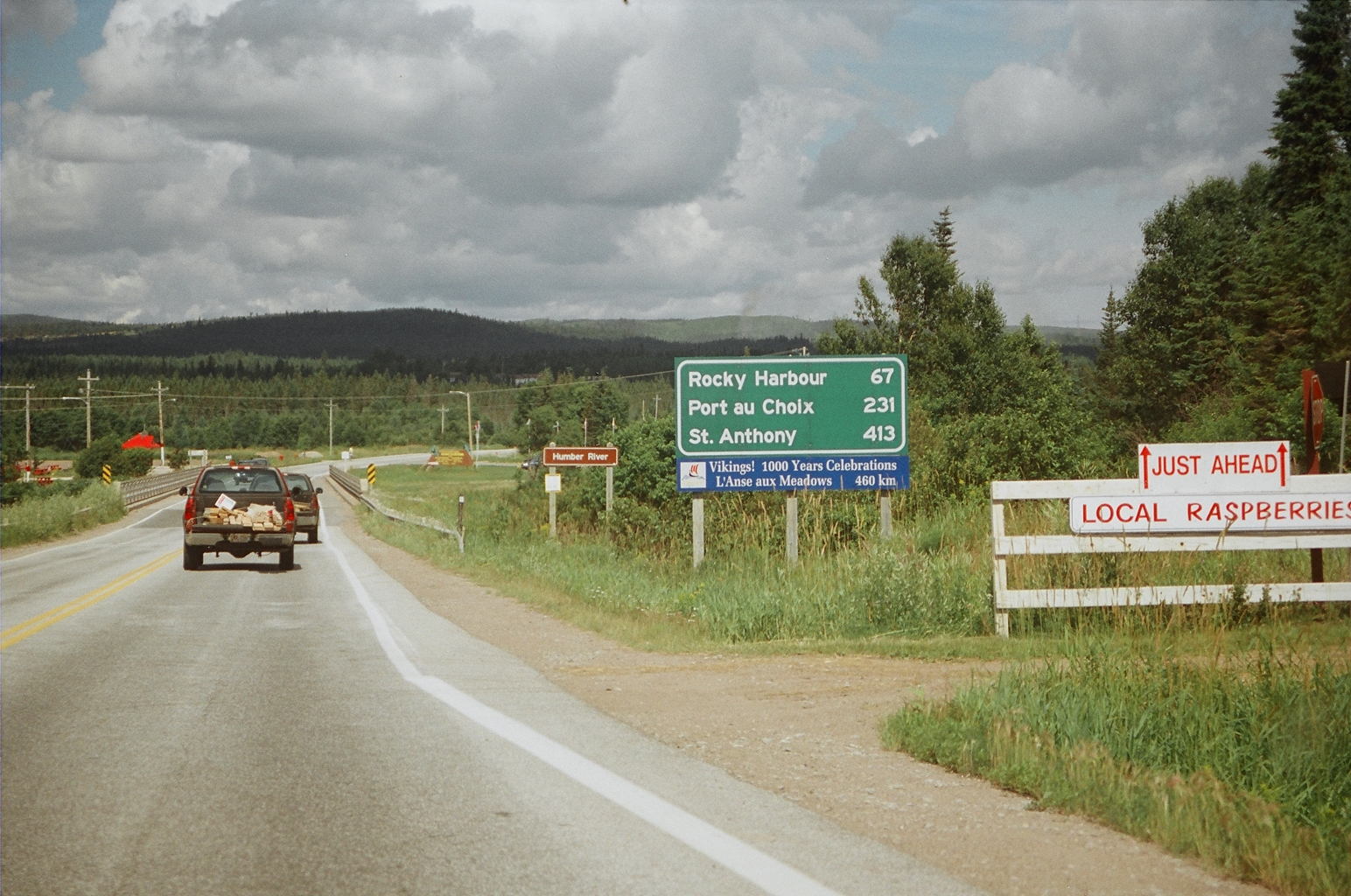

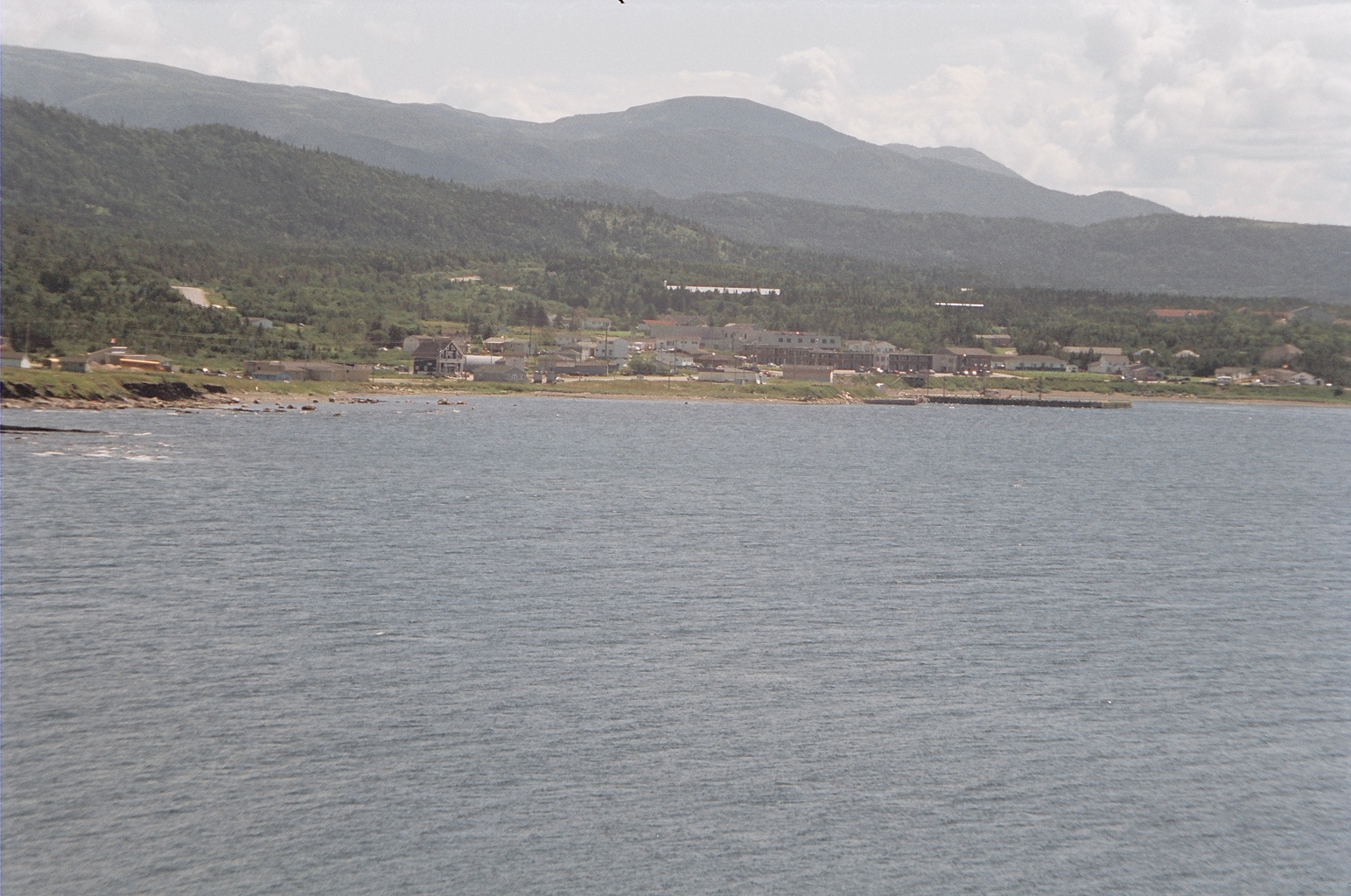

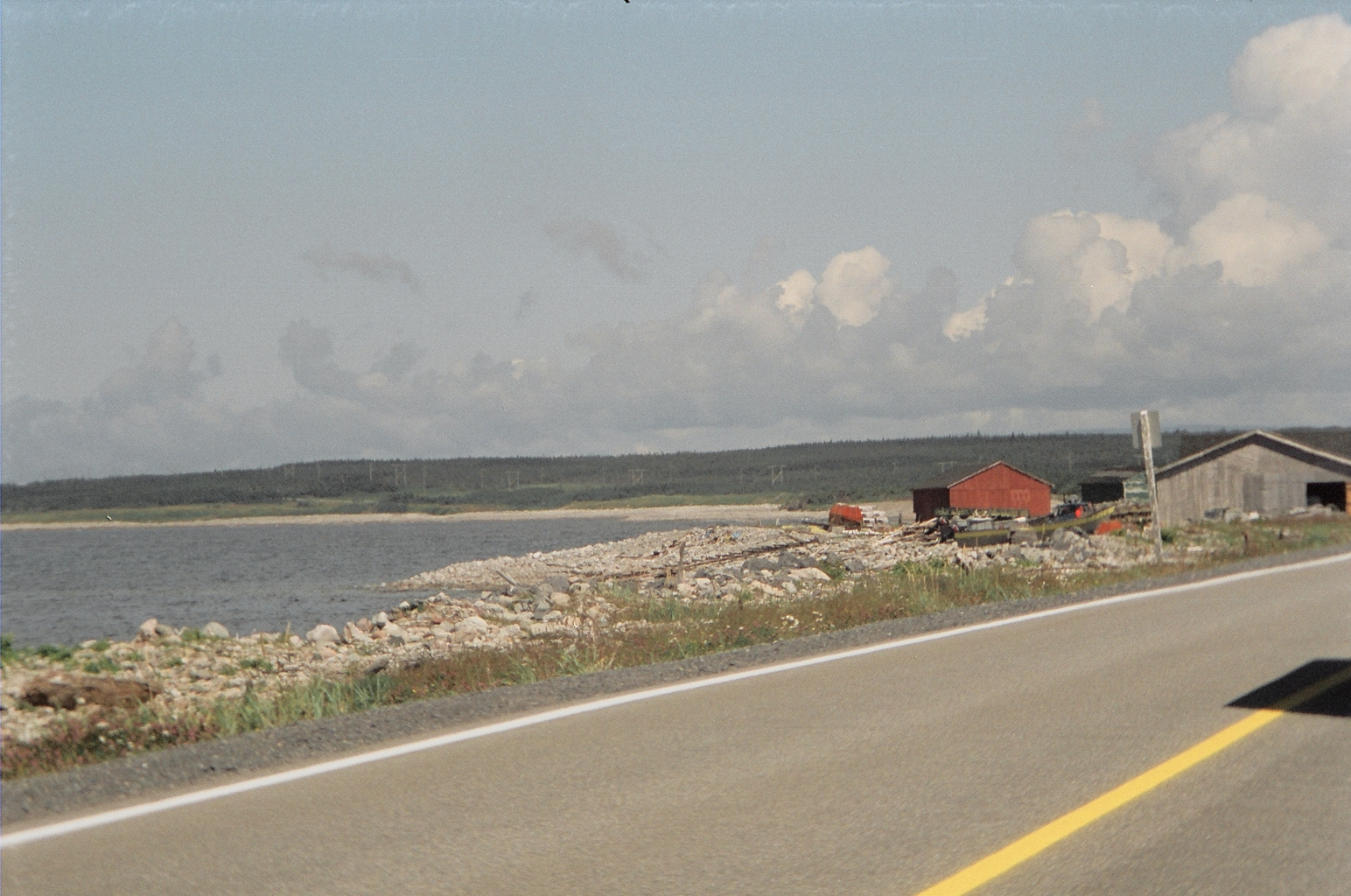

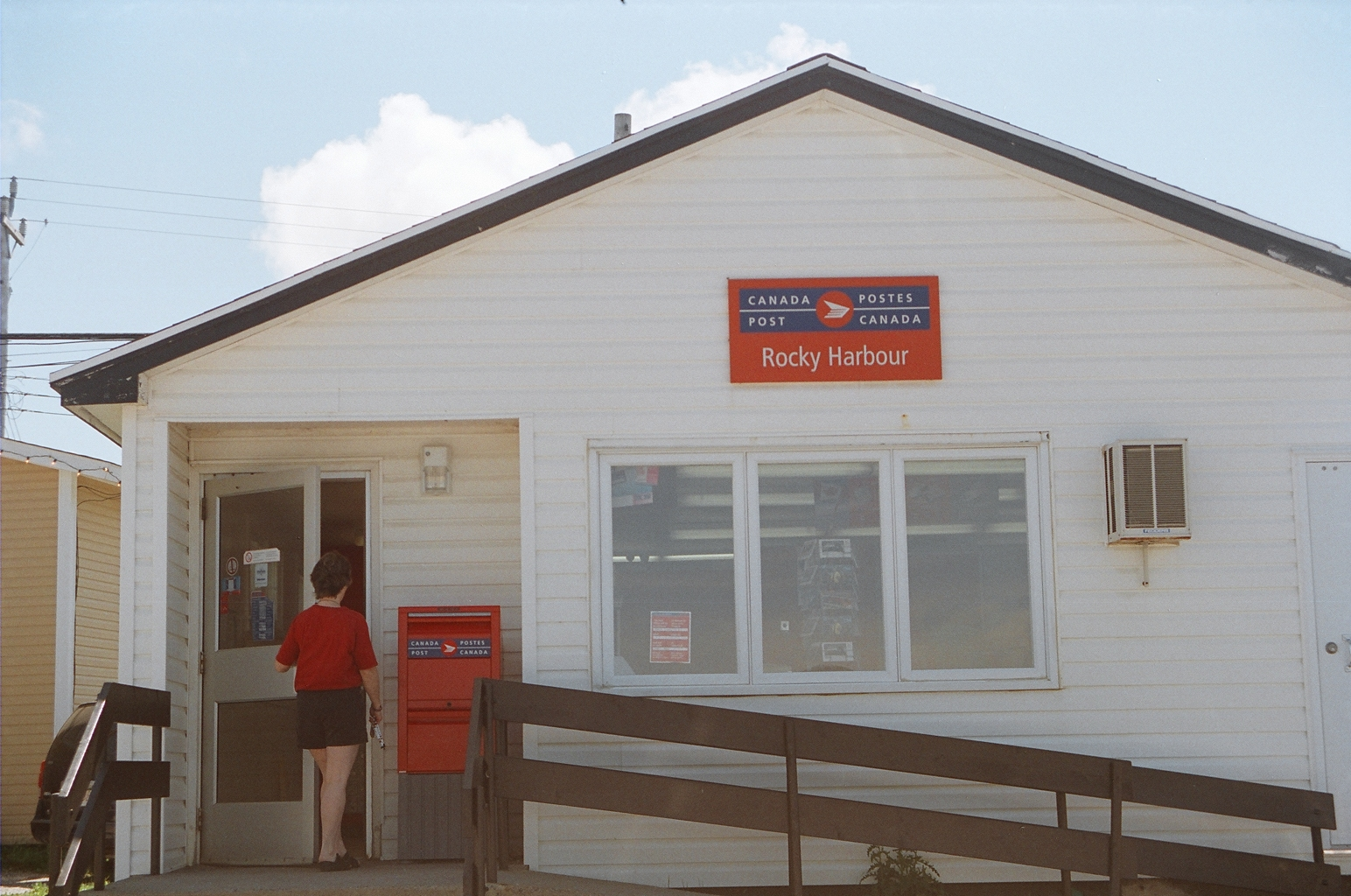

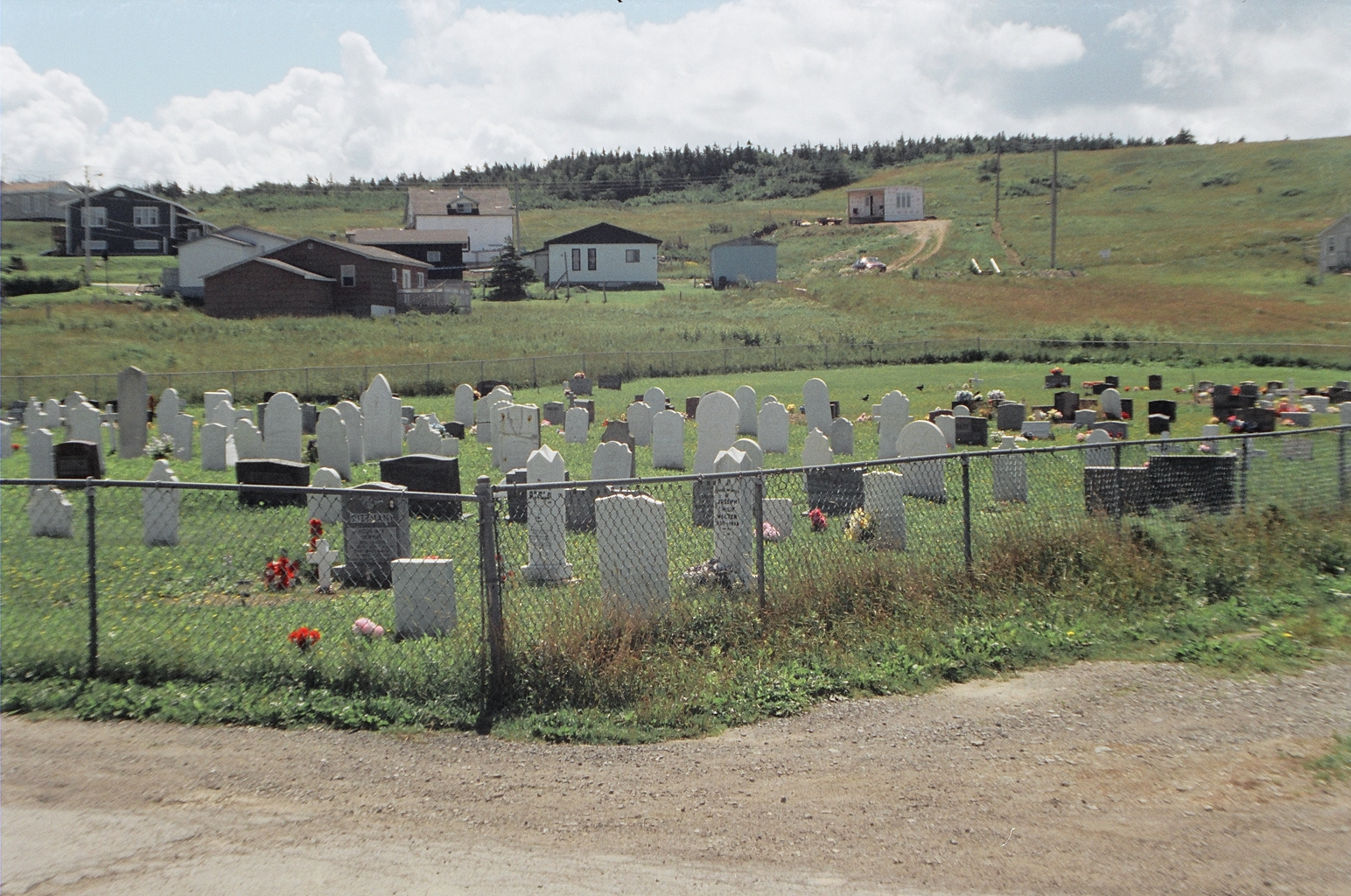

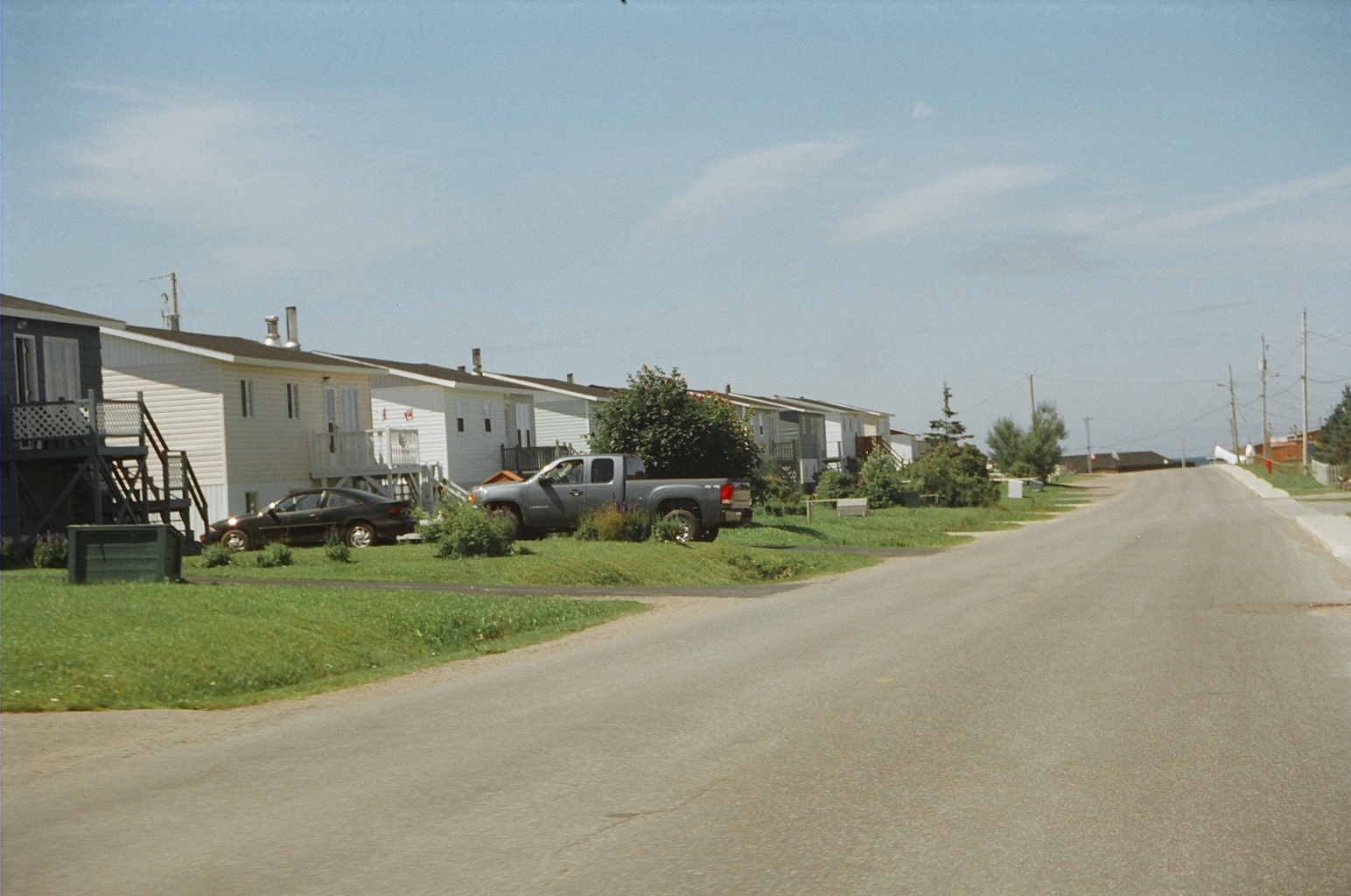

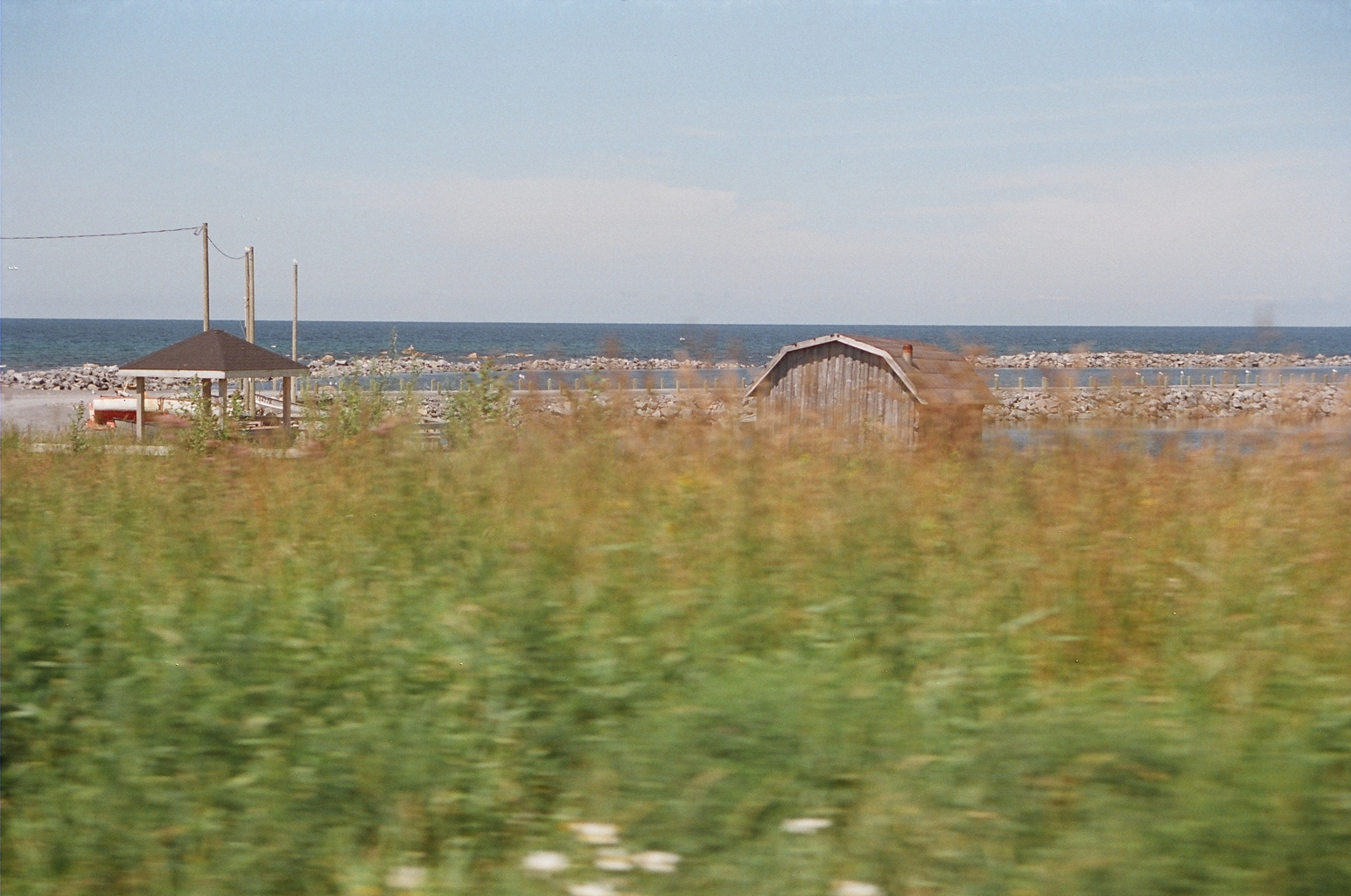

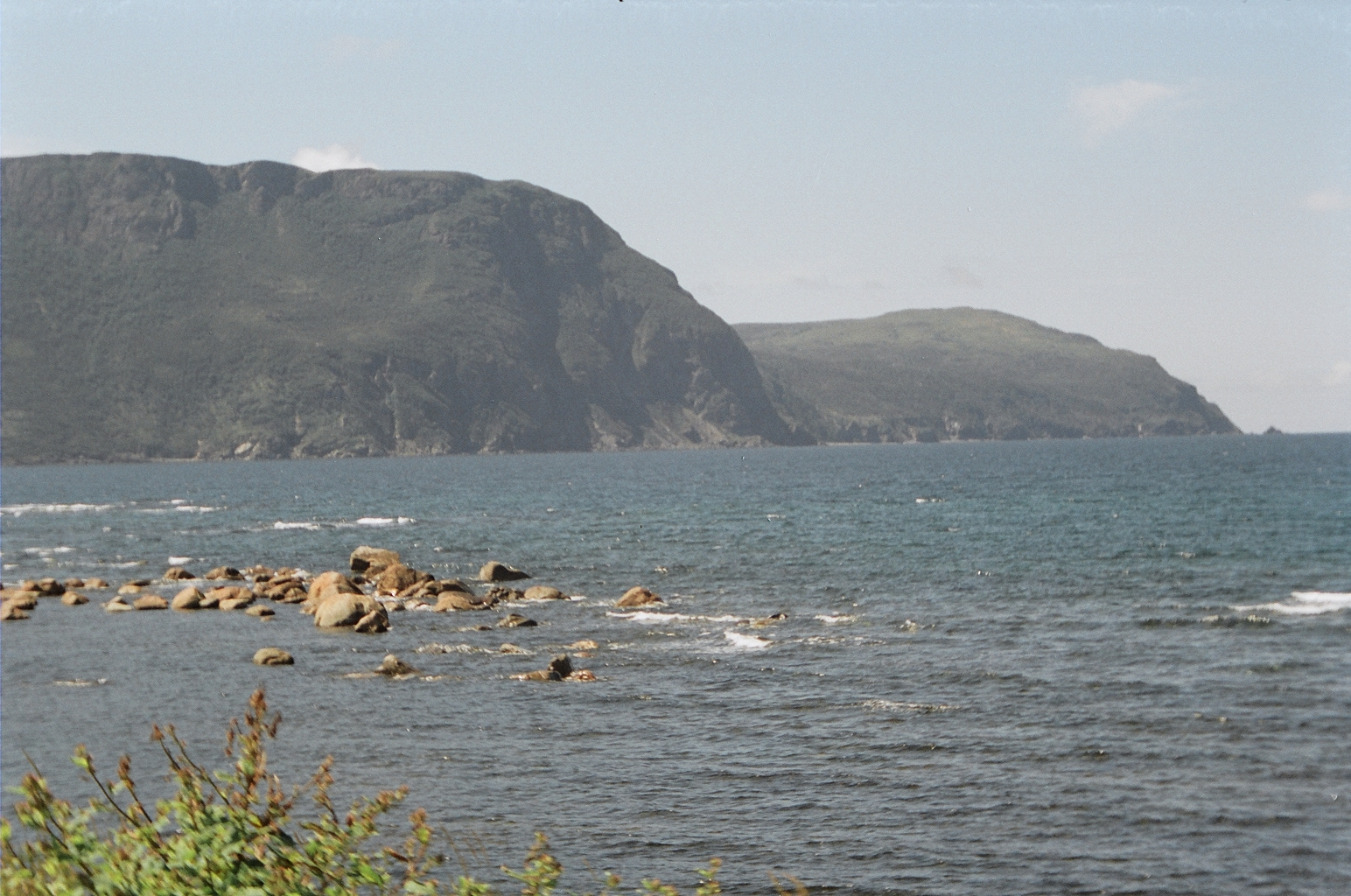

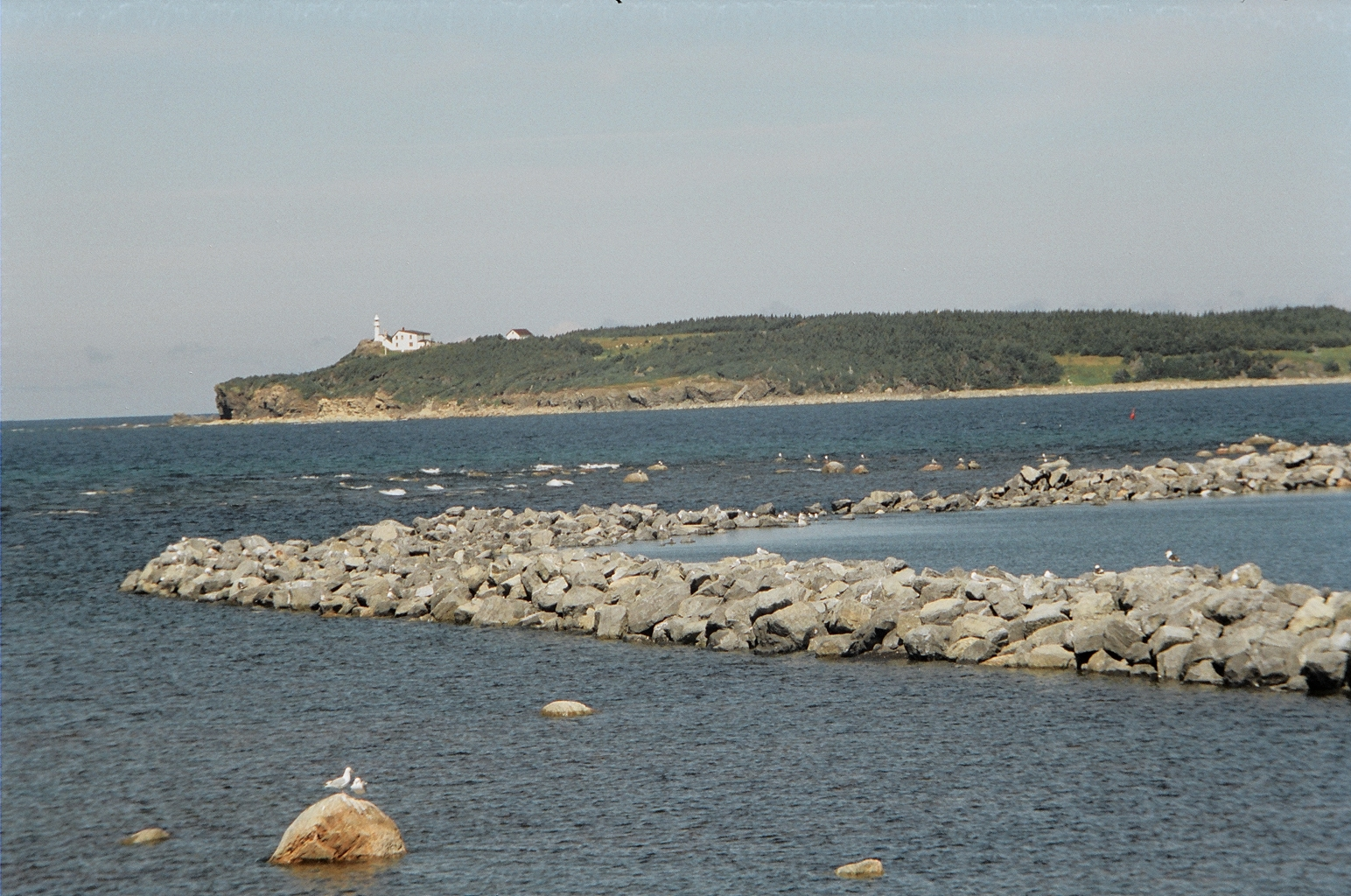

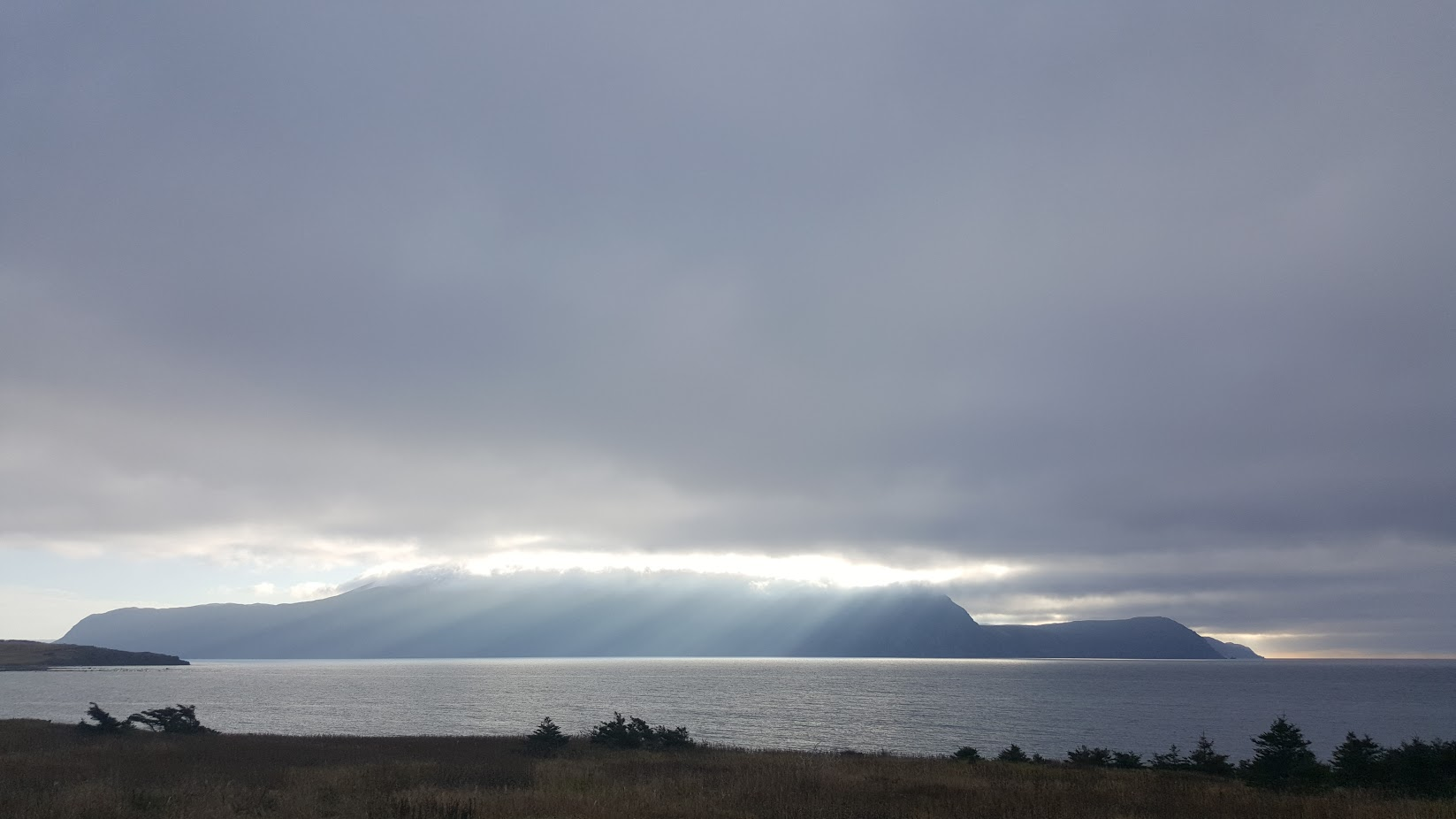

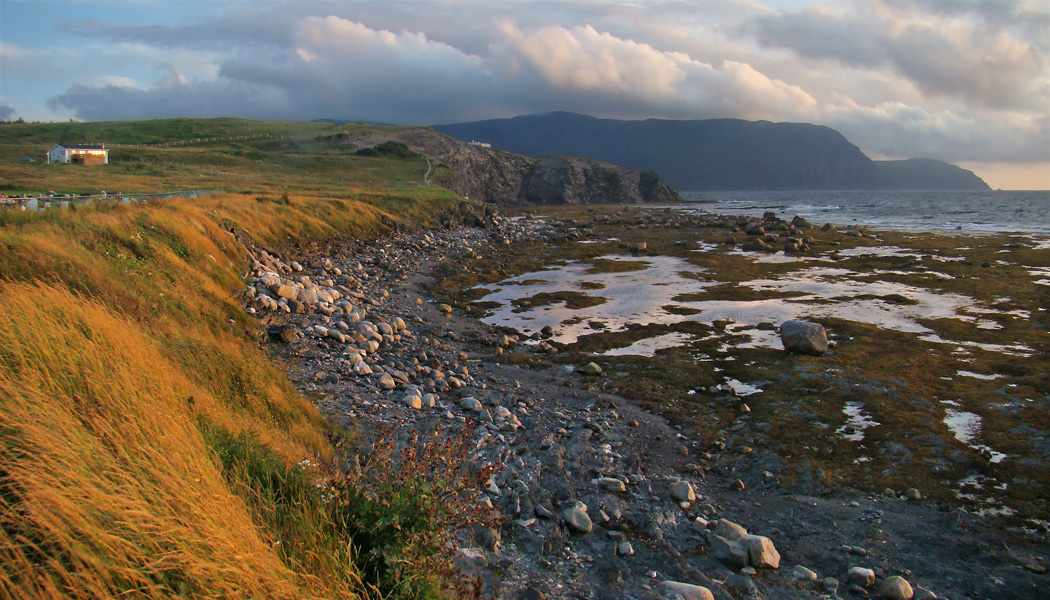

== See also ==
- List of cities and towns in Newfoundland and Labrador
