= List of islands and peninsulas of Hong Kong =

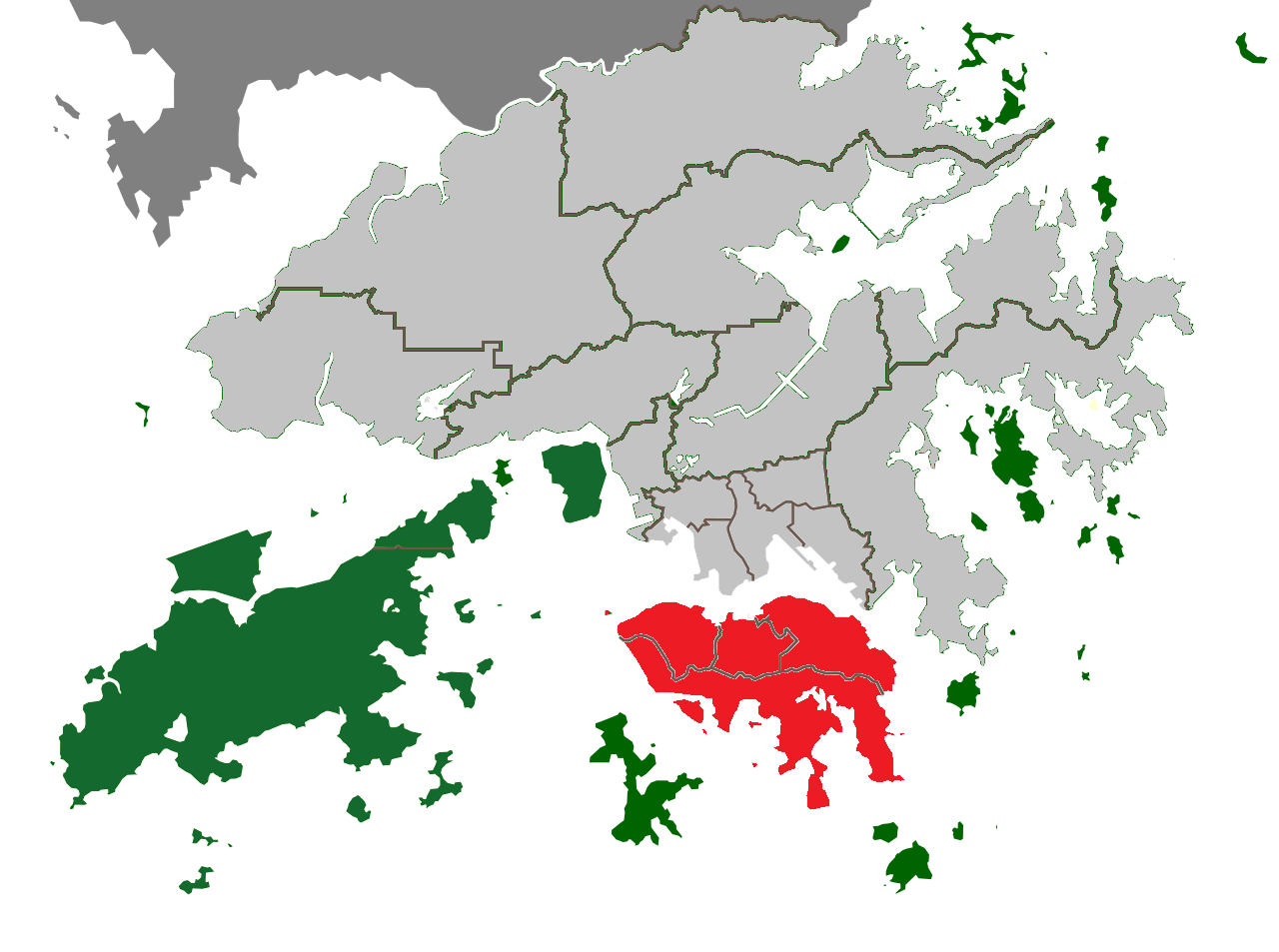
Islands of Hong Kong Island (red) and New Territories (green), but Kowloon Rock, the only island in Kowloon is so small that cannot be labelled

Hong Kong comprises Kowloon (including the Kowloon Peninsula and New Kowloon), the mainland of the New Territories, and 263 nearby islands over 500 m^{2} (5,400 sq ft) — the largest being Lantau Island and the second-largest being Hong Kong Island. Ap Lei Chau is one of the most densely populated islands in the world.

Hong Kong Island is historically the political and commercial centre of Hong Kong. It was the site of the initial settlement of Victoria City, where the financial district of Central is now located. Most of the other islands are commonly referred to as the Outlying Islands.

The Kowloon Peninsula, across Victoria Harbour from Hong Kong Island is another notable commercial centre in Hong Kong.

In terms of the districts of Hong Kong, while one of the 18 districts is called the Islands District, many islands of Hong Kong are actually not part of that district, which only consists of some twenty large and small islands in the southern and the south-western waters of Hong Kong. These islands belong to respective districts depending on their locations.

== Peninsulas ==
Below is a partial list of the peninsulas of Hong Kong and the districts they belong to:

=== Mainland ===
- Clear Water Bay Peninsula
- Fu Tau Sha Peninsula
- Kowloon Peninsula – Geographically, it refers to the area south of the mountain ranges of Beacon Hill, Lion Rock, Tate's Cairn, Kowloon Peak, etc. and covers five districts itself. Historically, only the portion south of Boundary Street was ceded to Britain by the Convention of Peking in 1860, covering the area of only one district in its entirety (Yau Tsim Mong) and portions of two other districts (southwestern part of Kowloon City, Stonecutters Island of Sham Shui Po).
- Sai Kung Peninsula
  - Pak Sha Wan Peninsula
- Sha Tau Kok Peninsula
- Tsing Chau Tsai Peninsula - Tsuen Wan District
- Wan Tsai Peninsula

=== Hong Kong Island ===
- D'Aguilar Peninsula – Southern District
- Red Hill Peninsula – Southern District
- Shek O Peninsula – Southern District
- Stanley Peninsula – Southern District

=== Lantau Island ===
- Chi Ma Wan Peninsula – Islands District
- Fan Lau – Islands District

=== Former peninsulas ===
- Tai Kok Tsui – Yau Tsim Mong District, can hardly be identified on maps now, due to land reclamation.
- Texaco Peninsula – Kwai Tsing District

== Islands ==
Below is a partial list of the islands of Hong Kong and the districts they belong to:

- A Chau (丫洲, Centre Island) – Tai Po
- A Chau (鴉洲) – North
- Adamasta Rock (北長洲石) – Islands
- Ap Chau Mei Pak Tun Pai (鴨洲尾白墩排) – North
- Ap Chau Pak Tun Pai (鴨洲白墩排) – North
- Ap Chau (鴨洲, Robinson Island) – North
- Ap Lei Chau (鴨脷洲, Aberdeen Island) – Southern
- Ap Lei Pai (鴨脷排) – Southern
- Ap Lo Chun (鴨籮春) – North
- Ap Tan Pai (鴨蛋排) – North
- Ap Tau Pai (鴨兜排) – North
- Bay Islet (匙洲, See Chau) – Sai Kung
- Breaker Reef (打浪排) – Tai Po
- Bun Bei Chau (崩鼻洲) – Sai Kung
- Bun Sha Pai (崩紗排) – Tai Po
- Cha Kwo Chau (茶果洲) – Islands
- Cha Yue Pai (炸魚排) – Sai Kung
- Cham Pai (杉排) – Tai Po
- Cham Pai (沉排) – Sai Kung
- Cham Tau Chau (枕頭洲) – Sai Kung
- Chap Mo Chau (執毛洲) – North
- Chau Tsai Kok (洲仔角) – Tai Po
- Chau Tsai (洲仔) – Sai Kung
- Che Lei Pai (扯里排) – Tai Po
- Chek Chau (赤洲, Port Island) – Tai Po
- Chek Lap Kok (赤鱲角) – Islands – now assimilated with Lam Chau into the airport platform and connected to Lantau Island by two bridges
- Cheung Chau (長洲) – Islands
- Cheung Shek Tsui (長石咀) – North
- Cheung Sok (長索) – Tsuen Wan
- Cheung Tsui Chau (長咀洲) – Sai Kung
- Ching Chau (青洲, distinct from Steep Island) – Sai Kung
- Conic Island (飯甑洲) – Sai Kung
- Douglas Rock (德己利士礁) – Islands
- Flat Island (銀洲, Ngan Chau) – Tai Po
- Fo Shek Chau (火石洲, Basalt Island) – Sai Kung
- Fo Siu Pai (火燒排) – Sai Kung
- Fu Wong Chau (虎王洲) – North
- Fun Chau (墳洲) – North
- Green Island (青洲) – Central & Western
- Ha So Pai (蝦鬚排) – Islands
- Hau Tsz Kok Pai (孝子角排) – Tai Po
- Hei Ling Chau (喜靈洲) – Islands
- Hin Pai (蜆排) – Tai Po
- Hok Tsai Pai (殼仔排) – Sai Kung
- Hong Kong Island (香港島)
- Hung Pai (紅排) – North
- Kai Chau (雞洲) – Sai Kung
- Kat O (吉澳, Crooked Island) – North
- Kau Pei Chau (狗脾洲) – Southern
- Kau Sai Chau (滘西洲) – Sai Kung
- Kau Yi Chau (交椅洲) – Islands
- Kiu Tau (橋頭) – Sai Kung
- Kiu Tsui Chau (橋咀洲, Sharp Island) – Sai Kung
- Ko Pai (高排) – North
- Kok Tai Pai (角大排) – North
- Kong Tau Pai (光頭排) – Sai Kung
- Kowloon Rock (九龍石) – Kowloon City
- Kung Chau (弓洲) – Tai Po
- Kwun Cham Wan (罐杉環) – Sai Kung
- Kwun Tsai (觀仔) – Sai Kung
- Lak Lei Tsai (癩痢仔) – Sai Kung
- Lamma Island (南丫島) – Islands
- Lan Shuen Pei (爛樹排) – North
- Lan Tau Pai (爛頭排) – Sai Kung
- Lantau Island (大嶼山) – Islands
- Lap Sap Chau (垃圾洲) – Sai Kung
- Little Green Island (小青洲) – Central & Western
- Lo Chau (羅洲) – Southern
- Lo Chi Pai (鷀鸕排) – North
- Lo Chi Pai (鷀鸕排) – Sai Kung
- Lo Fu Tiu Pai (老虎吊排) – Sai Kung
- Lo Shue Pai (老鼠排) – Eastern
- Loaf Rock (饅頭排) – Islands
- Luk Chau (鹿洲), formerly George I. – Islands
- Lung Kwu Chau (龍鼓洲) – Tuen Mun
- Lung Shan Pai (龍山排) – Southern
- Lung Shuen Pai (龍船排) – Sai Kung
- Lut Chau (甩洲) – Yuen Long
- Ma Shi Chau (馬屎洲) – Tai Po
- Ma Tsai Pai (孖仔排) – Sai Kung
- Ma Wan (馬灣) – Tsuen Wan
- Ma Yan Pai (媽印排) – Tai Po
- Magazine Island (火藥洲, Fo Yeuk Chau) – Southern
- Mei Pai (尾排) – Islands
- Middle Island (熨波洲) – Southern
- Mong Chau Tsai (芒洲仔) – Sai Kung
- Moon Island (磨洲, Mo Chau) – Tai Po
- Muk Yue Chau (木魚洲) – Sai Kung
- Nam Fung Chau (南風洲) – Sai Kung
- Ng Fan Chau (五分洲) – Southern
- Nga Ying Chau (牙鷹洲) – Sai Kung Southeast to Ching Chau (青洲)
- Nga Ying Pai (牙鷹排) – Sai Kung
- Ngam Hau Shek (岩口石) – Tsuen Wan
- Ngan Chau (銀洲) – Islands
- Ngau Shi Pui (牛屎砵) – Sai Kung
- Ngau Tau Pai (牛頭排) – Sai Kung
- Ngo Mei Chau (娥眉洲, Crescent Island) – North
- Ninepin Group (果洲群島) – Sai Kung
  - Lung Shuen Pai (龍船排)
  - North Ninepin Island (北果洲)
  - Sai Chau Mei (細洲尾)
  - Shue Long Chau (薯莨洲)
  - Tai Chau (大洲)
  - Tai Chau Mei (大洲尾)
  - Tuen Chau Chai (短洲仔)
- Pak Chau (白洲, Tree Island) – Tuen Mun
- Pak Ka Chau (筆架洲) – North
- Pak Ma Tsui Pai (白馬咀排) – Sai Kung
- Pak Pai (白排) – Sai Kung
- Pak Sha Chau (白沙洲, Round Island) – North
- Pak Sha Chau (白沙洲, White Sand Island) – Sai Kung
- Pat Ka Chau (筆架洲) – North
- Peaked Hill (雞翼角) – Islands
- Peng Chau (坪洲) – Islands
- Pearl Island (龍珠島) – Tuen Mun
- Pin Chau (扁洲) – Sai Kung
- Ping Chau (平洲) – Tai Po
- Ping Min Chau (平面洲) – Sai Kung
- Po Pin Chau (破邊洲) – Sai Kung
- Po Toi Islands (蒲苔群島) – Islands
  - Castle Rock (螺洲白排)
  - Beaufort Island (螺洲, Lo Chau)
  - Mat Chau (墨洲), an islet off Po Toi Island
  - Mat Chau Pai (墨洲排), an islet off Mat Chau
  - Po Toi Island (蒲苔島)
  - Sai Pai (細排)
  - San Pai (散排)
  - Sung Kong (宋崗)
  - Tai Pai (大排)
  - Waglan Island (橫瀾島)
- Po Yue Pai (蒲魚排) – Sai Kung
- Pun Shan Shek (半山石) – Tsuen Wan
- Pyramid Rock (尖柱石) – Sai Kung
- Round Island (銀洲) – Southern
- Sai Ap Chau (細鴨洲) – North
- Sam Pai (三排) – Sai Kung
- Sam Pui Chau (三杯酒) – Tai Po
- Sha Chau (沙洲) – Tuen Mun
- Sha Pai (沙排) – North
- Sha Pai (沙排) – Tai Po
- Sha Tong Hau (沙塘口山, Bluff Island) – Sai Kung
- Sham Shui Pai (深水排) – Islands
- Shau Kei Pai (筲箕排) – North
- Shek Chau (石洲) – Sai Kung
- Shek Kwu Chau (石鼓洲) – Islands
- Shek Ngau Chau (石牛洲) – Tai Po
- Shelter Island (牛尾洲) – Sai Kung
- Sheung Pai (雙排) – North
- Shui Cham Tsui Pai (水浸咀排) – North
- Shui Pai (水排) – Islands
- Siu Kau Yi Chau (小交椅洲) – Islands
- Siu Nim Chau (小稔洲) – North
- Siu Tsan Chau (小鏟洲) – Sai Kung
- Soko Islands (索罟群島) – Islands
  - Cheung Muk Tau (樟木頭)
  - Ko Pai (高排)
  - Lung Shuen Pai (龍船排)
  - Ma Chau (孖洲)
  - Shek Chau (石洲)
  - Siu A Chau (小鴉洲)
  - Tai A Chau (大鴉洲)
  - Tau Lo Chau (頭顱洲)
  - Wan Hau Chau (灣口洲)
  - Wu Yeung Chau Pai (湖洋洲排)
  - Yuen Chau (圓洲)
  - Yuen Kong Chau (圓崗洲)
- Steep Island (青洲, Ching Chau) – Sai Kung
- Sunshine Island (周公島) – Islands
- Ta Ho Pai (打蠔排) – North
- Tai Chau (大洲) – Sai Kung
- Tai Lei (大利) – Islands
- Tai Nim Chau (大稔洲) – North
- Tai O (大澳) – Islands
- Tai Pai (大排) – Sai Kung
- Tai Tau Chau (Sai Kung District) (大頭洲) – Sai Kung
- Tai Tau Chau (Southern District) (大頭洲) – Southern
- Tai Tsan Chau (大鏟洲) – Sai Kung
- Tang Chau (燈洲) – Tai Po
- Tang Lung Chau (燈籠洲) – Tsuen Wan
- Tap Mun Chau (塔門, Grass Island) – Tai Po
- Tau Chau (頭洲) – Southern
- The Brothers (磨刀洲) – Tuen Mun
  - Siu Mo To (小磨刀)
  - Tai Mo To (大磨刀)
  - Tsz Kan Chau (匙羹洲)
- Tit Cham Chau (鐵蔘洲) – Sai Kung
- Tit Shue Pai (鐵樹排) – Tai Po
- Tiu Chung Chau (吊鐘洲, Jin Island) – Sai Kung
- Tiu Chung Pai (吊鐘排) – Sai Kung
- Tong Hau Pai (塘口排) – Sai Kung
- Tong Yan Pai (劏人排) – Southern
- Town Island (伙頭墳洲) – Sai Kung
- Trio Island (大癩痢) – Sai Kung
- Tsim Chau Group – Sai Kung
  - Tai Chau (大洲)
  - Tsim Chau (尖洲)
- Tsing Chau (青洲, Table Island) – North
- Tsing Yi Island (青衣島) – Kwai Tsing
- Tsui Pai (咀排) – Islands
- Tuen Tau Chau (斷頭洲) – Sai Kung
- Tung Lung Chau (東龍洲) – Sai Kung
- Tung Sam Chau (棟心洲) – Sai Kung
- Wai Chau Pai (灣仔排) – Tai Po
- Wai Kap Pai (桅夾排) – Sai Kung
- Wang Chau (橫洲) – Sai Kung
- Wang Pai (橫排) – Sai Kung
- Wo Sheung Chau (和尚洲) – Sai Kung
- Wong Mau Chau (黃茅洲) – Sai Kung
- Wong Nai Chau Tsai (黃泥洲仔) – Sai Kung
- Wong Nai Chau (黃泥洲) – North
- Wong Nai Chau (黃泥洲) – North
- Wong Nai Chau (黃泥洲) – Sai Kung
- Wong Wan Chau (往灣洲, Double Island) – North
- Wong Wan Pai (往灣排) – Sai Kung
- Wong Yi Chau (黃宜洲) – Sai Kung
- Wu Chau (烏洲) – North
- Wu Chau (烏洲) – Tai Po
- Wu Pai (烏排) – North
- Wu Yeung Chau Pai (湖洋洲排) – North
- Wu Ying Pai (烏蠅排) – Islands
- Yan Chau (印洲) – North
- Yau Lung Kok (游龍角) – Sai Kung
- Yeung Chau (洋洲) – North
- Yeung Chau (洋洲) – Tai Po
- Yeung Chau (羊洲), Sheep Island – Sai Kung
- Yi Long Pai (二浪排) – Islands
- Yi Pai (二排) – Sai Kung
- Yim Tin Tsai (鹽田仔) – Tai Po
- Yim Tin Tsai (鹽田仔, Little Salt Field) – Sai Kung
- Yuen Kong Chau (圓崗洲) – Sai Kung

=== Former islands ===
- Channel Rock – Kowloon City – now a part of the Kai Tak former airport runway
- Chau Tsai – absorbed by reclaimed land of Tsing Yi Island, near CRC Oil Depot of Nam Wan Kok
- Fat Tong Chau (佛堂洲, Junk Island) – now a part of Tseung Kwan O, Sai Kung as a result of land reclamation
- Hoi Sham Island – Kowloon City (also To Kwa Wan Island) – now part of Hoi Sham Park in To Kwa Wan as a result of reclamation
- Kellett Island – now part of Causeway Bay as a result of gradual land reclamation, Eastern
- La Ka Chau (勒加洲)
- Lam Chau – Islands – now assimilated with Chek Lap Kok into the airport platform and connected to Lantau by two bridges
- Lo Shue Pai
- Leung Shuen Wan (糧船灣洲, High Island), Sai Kung – connected to the mainland to form the High Island Reservoir
- Mong Chau – an island off the hill of Lai King, buried under the Terminal 2 of the Container Terminal
- Mouse Island – an island in Sam Shing, Tuen Mun and now a part of Mouse Island Children's Playground
- Nga Ying Chau – now at the northeast corner of Tsing Yi Island as a result of land reclamation, which name was preserved in the street name nearby "Nga Ying Chau Street"
- Rumsey Rock – now a part of shore between Tsim Sha Tsui East and Hung Hom
- Stonecutters Island – a former island, now part of the Kowloon Peninsula, following land reclamation
- Tsing Chau, or Pillar Island – absorbed into reclaimed land of Gin Drinkers Bay or Lap Sap Wan. It is at Kwai Chung, next to Tsing Yi Bridge
- Tung Tau Chau (東頭洲) – connected to the mainland to form the Plover Cove Reservoir
- Yuen Chau Tsai (元洲仔)
- Un Chau
- Careening Island
- New Wing of Hong Kong Convention and Exhibition Centre

== Largest islands ==
The following is a list of the largest islands of Hong Kong, sorted by area (km^{2}):

1. Lantau Island 147.16
2. Hong Kong Island 78.52
3. Lamma Island 13.74
4. Chek Lap Kok – the site of the airport platform, 12.70 km^{2}
5. Tsing Yi Island 10.69
6. Kau Sai Chau 6.70
7. Po Toi 3.69
8. Cheung Chau 2.44
9. Tung Lung Chau 2.42
10. Crooked Island (Kat O) 2.35
11. Wong Wan Chau (Double Island) 2.13
12. Hei Ling Chau 1.93
13. Tap Mun Chau (Grass Island) 1.69
14. An artificial island for the Boundary Crossing Facilities and the southern entrance of the Tuen Mun–Chek Lap Kok Link Tunnel 1.50
15. Ap Lei Chau 1.30
16. Tai A Chau 1.20
17. Tung Ping Chau 1.16
18. Peng Chau 0.97
19. Ma Wan 0.97

Leung Shuen Wan was connected to the mainland in the 1970s to form the High Island Reservoir. It historically had an area of 8.511 km^{2} and was in 1960 the 4th largest island of Hong Kong. At that time, the airport platform had not yet been built and the area of Tsing Yi increased later as a consequence of land reclamation.

The original Chek Lap Kok had an area of 3.02 km^{2} (other sources mention 2.8 km^{2}). By the time when the airport was open the size of the island was cited to be 1,248 hectares.

== Islands by population ==
1. Hong Kong Island
2. Tsing Yi
3. Lantau
4. Ap Lei Chau
5. Cheung Chau
6. Ma Wan
7. Lamma
8. Peng Chau
9. Pearl Island
10. Grass Island
11. Crooked Island

== See also ==
- Geography of Hong Kong
- List of artificial islands of Hong Kong
- List of islands and peninsula of Macau
- List of islands of Asia
- List of islands of China
- List of islands in the Pacific Ocean
- List of islands in the South China Sea
- List of islands of Taiwan
- List of places in Hong Kong
- Transport in Hong Kong – for details about the ferry services between the islands and the rest of the territory
- Wanshan Archipelago – a series of islands south of Hong Kong
