= Loaf (disambiguation) =

Loaf is a food shape, typical of bread.

Loaf may also refer to:

- Loaf (album), by moe.
- Loaf (company), a retailer
- Loaf Island, Alaska, US
- Loaf Island (Nunavut), Canada
- Loaf Mountain, Wyoming, US
- Loaf Rock, Antarctica
- Catloaf, a cat body position
- Loaf, a character in the film Hoppers
- The UAZ-452 Russian military transport, commonly called a "loaf"

== See also ==
- Loafer (disambiguation)
- Social loafing
- Loafing (ice hockey)
