= Breaker Reef =

Uninhabited island of Hong Kong

Coordinates: 22.4666°N 114.4166°E

Breaker Reef (Chinese: 打浪排; pinyin: Dǎlàng Pái) is an uninhabited island of Hong Kong which is part of Tai Po District, New Territories. It is located in Mirs Bay to the southwest of Shek Ngau Chau.
