= Kowloon Bay =

Bay and neighbourhood in Kowloon, Hong Kong

Coordinates: 22°19′N 114°12′E

- Traditional Chinese: 九龍灣
- Simplified Chinese: 九龙湾
- Jyutping: Gau2 lung4 waan1
- Cantonese Yale: Gáu lùhng wāan
- Hanyu Pinyin: Jiǔlóng Wān
- Literal meaning: bay of the 9 dragons
Transcriptions
Standard Mandarin
- Hanyu Pinyin: Jiǔlóng Wān
Yue: Cantonese
- Yale Romanization: Gáu lùhng wāan
- Jyutping: Gau2 lung4 waan1

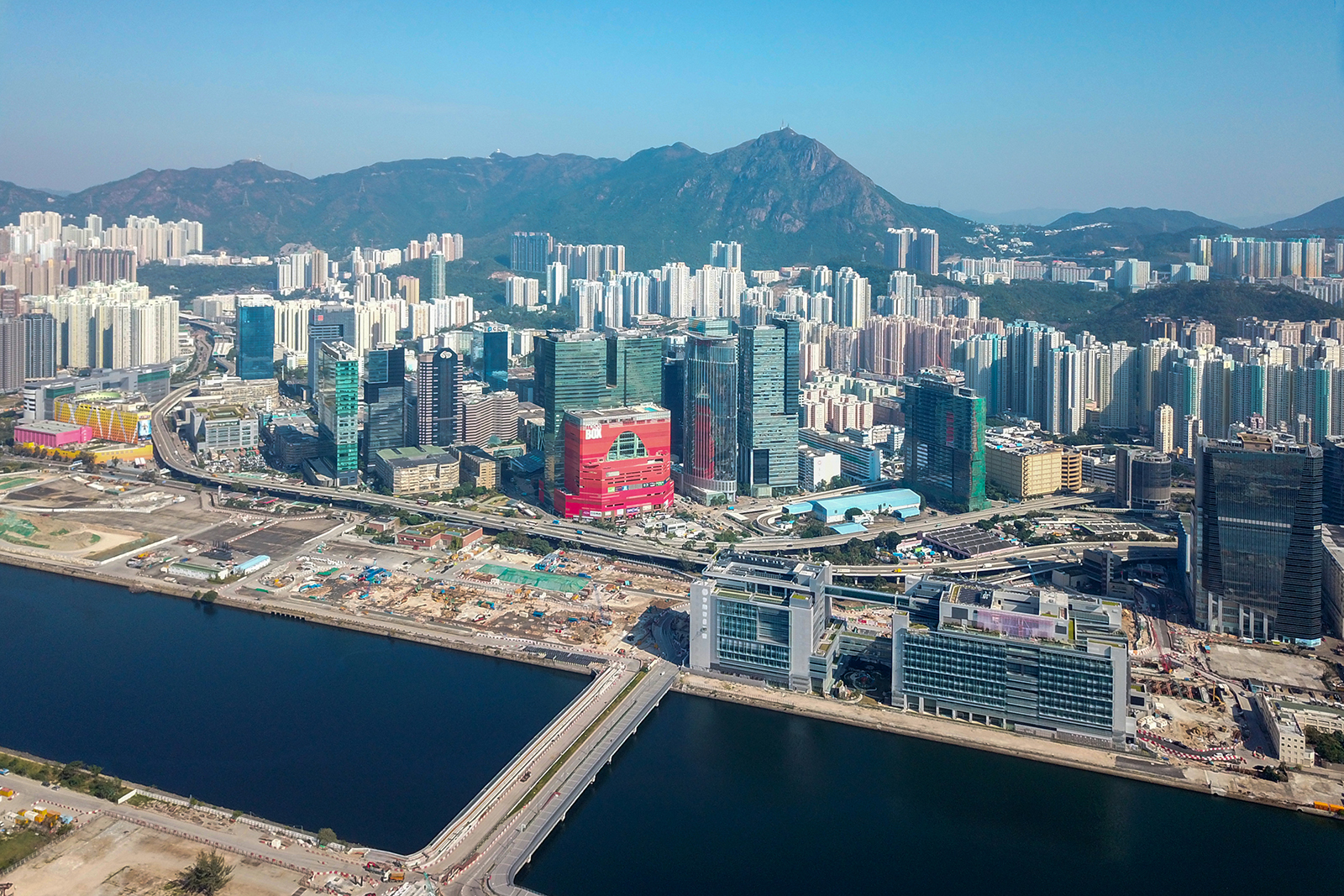
A panoramic view of Kowloon Bay reclamation (left) and Ngau Tau Kok (right) across from it. The old Kai Tak Airport runway is on the left.

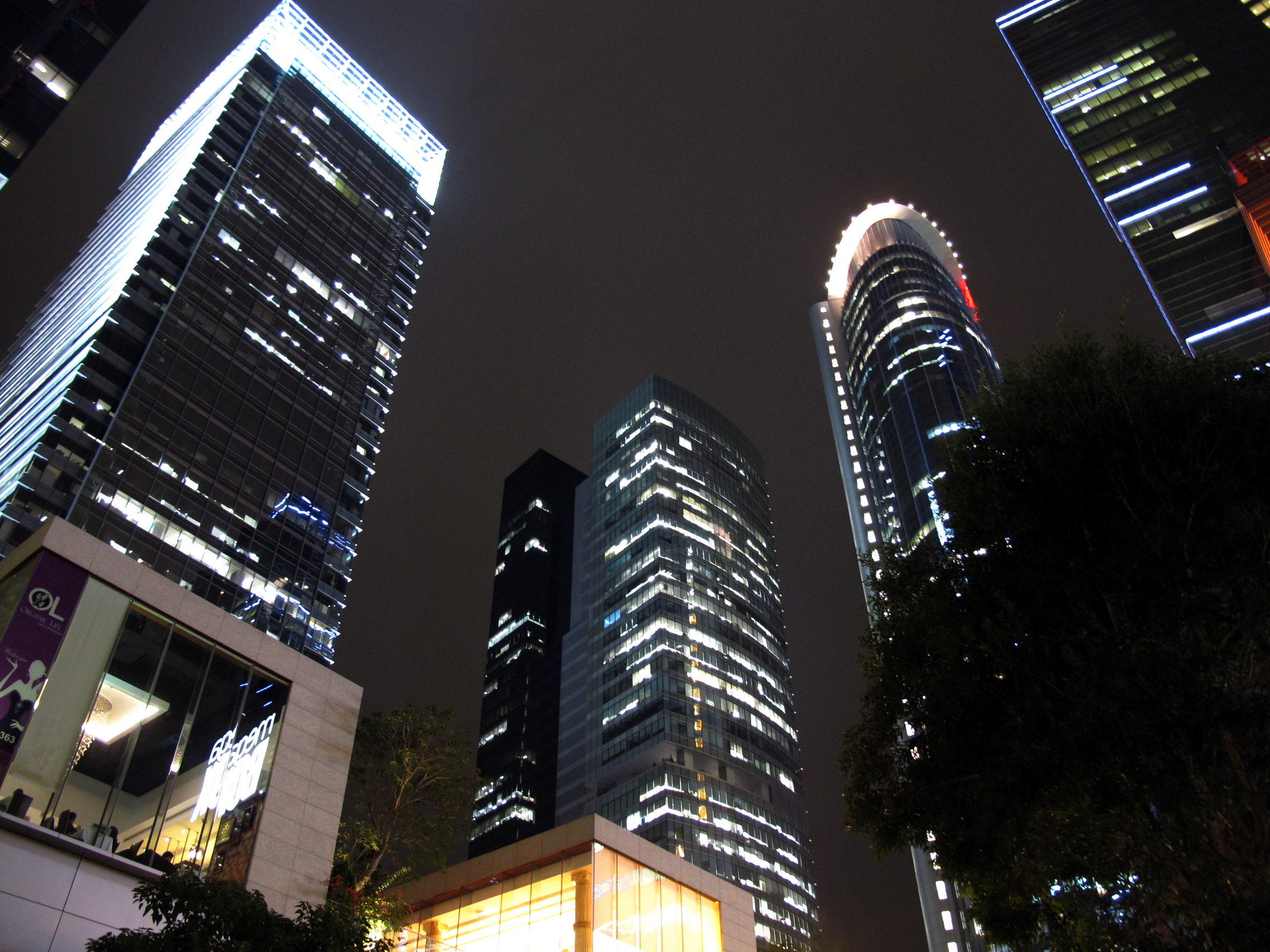
High-rise office buildings in Kowloon Bay

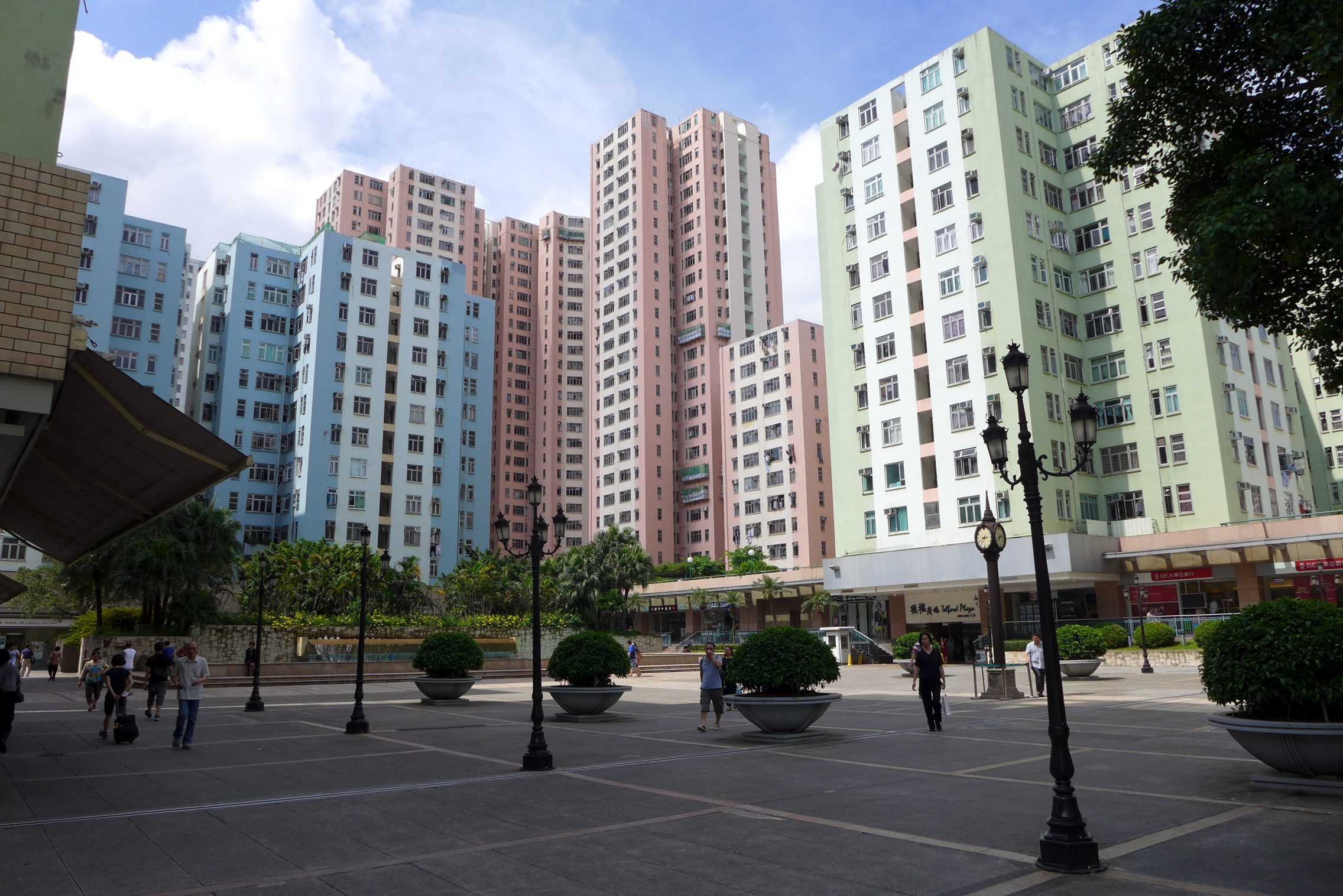
Telford Gardens

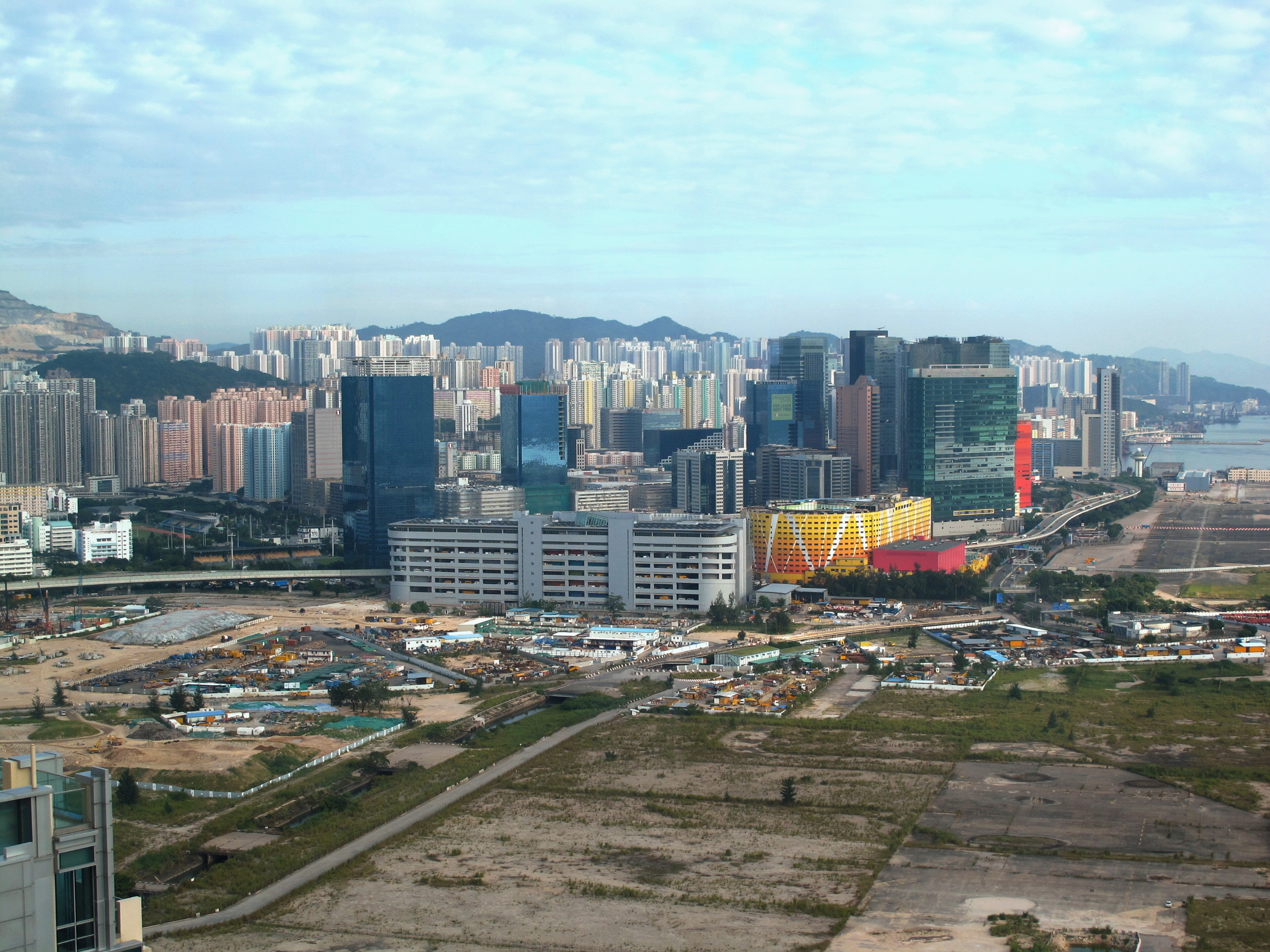
The skyline of Kowloon Bay

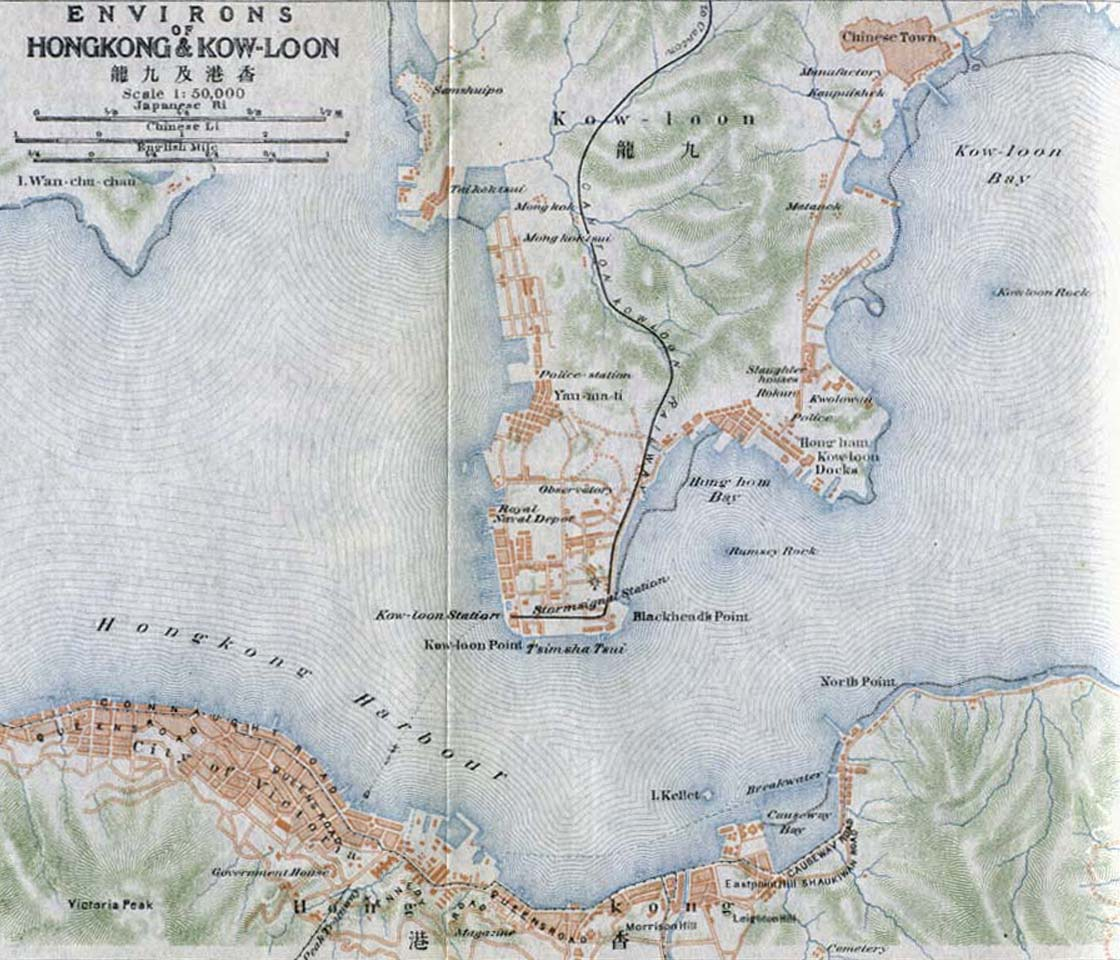
A 1915 topographical map of Kowloon Bay, Kowloon Peninsula and Hong Kong Harbour. Kowloon Bay is located in the upper right part of the map.

Kowloon Bay (Chinese: 九龍灣; Jyutping: gau2 lung4 waan1) is a bay within Victoria Harbour and a neighbourhood within Kowloon, Hong Kong.

The bay is located at the east of the Kowloon Peninsula and north of Hong Kong Island. It is the eastern portion of Victoria Harbour, between Hung Hom and Lei Yue Mun. The bay was divided into half when the 13/31 runway of the former Kai Tak International Airport was constructed in the middle of the bay in the mid-1950s.

The reclamation of north-eastern Kowloon Bay near Ngau Tau Kok is also named Kowloon Bay. It was formerly known as Ngau Tau Kok Industrial Area. After the construction of MTR Kowloon Bay station, the area is referred to as Kowloon Bay. The area near the MTR station is residential while the area near the shore is industrial. The area is traditionally an extension of Ngau Tau Kok, and thus facilities such as Ngau Tau Kok Police Station are located there.

== Governance ==
Administratively, the reclamation of Kowloon Bay and water east of the runway except the airport area is part of Kwun Tong District. The airport and the waters of the district, on the other hand, belong to Kowloon City District.

== Geography ==
Kowloon Bay has undergone massive reclamation over the past century. San Po Kong, which is now far from the coast, was reclaimed from the bay in the early days.

The western part of the bay is now protected from the sea by a breakwater, and forms the To Kwa Wan typhoon shelter. A small barrel rock, the Kowloon Rock, is in the typhoon shelter. Other barrel rocks, the Channel Rock and the Hoi Sham Island (also To Kwa Wan Island), are now connected to land at the former Kai Tak International Airport runway and at To Kwa Wan respectively, by land reclamation.

== Features ==
The former Kai Tak International Airport was built on land in Kowloon Bay and its one and only runway, which juts out into the bay, is surrounded by water on three sides. The airport was closed in 1998 and now a cruise terminal occupies a part of the site.

Kowloon Bay Depot, the first MTR depot, is located in the area.

== Buildings ==
- Amoy Gardens, large private estate
- Electrical and Mechanical Services Department Headquarters
- Enterprise Square Five, a complex comprising MegaBox shopping mall and two office buildings
- The Bay Hub, an office building formerly named Goldin Financial Global Centre
- Hong Kong Pacific Tower, a grade-A commercial building
- Kai Yip Estate, a public housing estate
- Kowloonbay International Trade & Exhibition Centre (KITEC), an exhibition and convention centre which also hosts many concerts, closed in 2024 for redevelopment.
- Richland Gardens, a Private Sector Participation Scheme estate
- Skyline Tower 2, an office tower
- Billion Centre, an office building
- Telford Gardens, a private housing estate built on top of MTR's Kowloon Bay station depot
- East Kowloon Cultural Centre, opening in 2025

== Economy ==
Fung Seng Enterprises has its head office in Kowloon Bay.

== Education ==
Schools and institutions are scarce in this district. The most famous ones include the SPACE of the University of Hong Kong, Town Center of City University of Hong Kong and YCH Law Chan Chor Si College.

Kowloon Bay is in Primary One Admission (POA) School Net 46. Within the school net are multiple aided schools (operated independently but funded with government money); no government primary schools are in this net.

== Schools ==
- Kellett School
- Kowloon Bay St. John The Baptist Catholic Primary School

== Future ==
In the 1990s, there were plans to convert the bay (reclaiming part or even the entire bay) and the former airport site into an in-city new town which would house 240 to 340 thousand residents and a sports stadium. The reduction in demand for land, environmental issues, and public outcry led to a revision of the project. The scheme would not comply with the Protection of the Harbour Ordinance. Hence, the Kai Tak Development plans do not include any land reclamation. A cruise terminal opened on the southern part of the runway.

== Transport ==
The area is serviced by MTR Kowloon Bay station on the Kwun Tong line which is beside Telford Plaza, along with many bus routes along Kwun Tong Road.

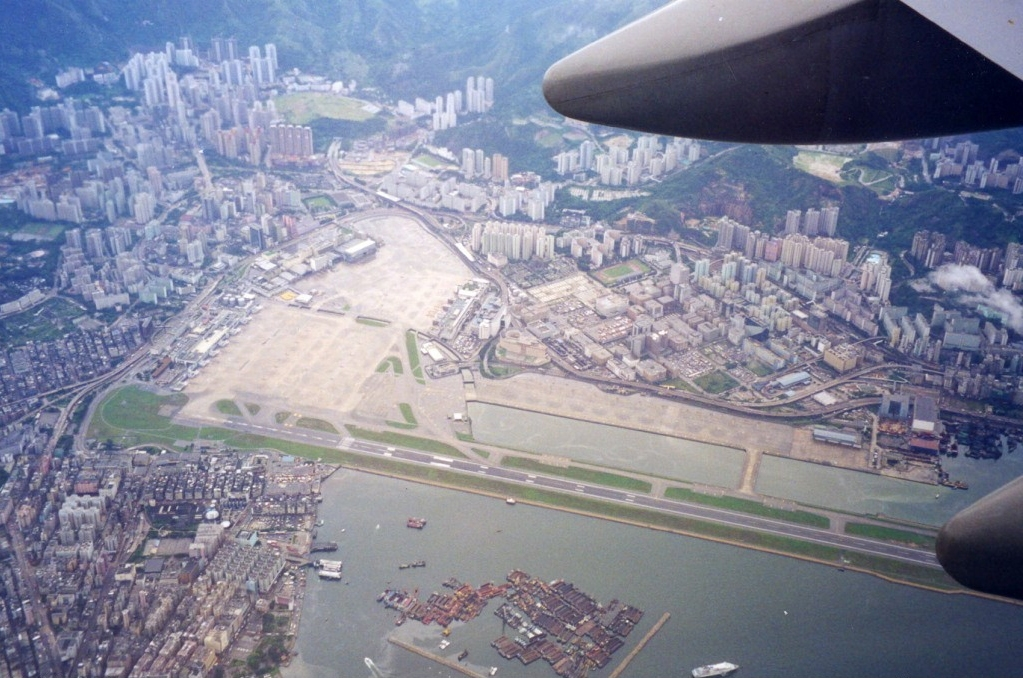
Kai Tak airport and Kowloon Bay.

The old airport Kai Tak Airport was located next to Kowloon Bay. The airport was closed in 1998 and the new one was opened on Chep Lap Kok.

== See also ==
- Public housing estates in Ngau Tau Kok and Kowloon Bay
- List of bays in Hong Kong
- List of places in Hong Kong
