= Pearl Island =

Pearl Island may refer to:

- Mikimoto Pearl Island in Japan
- Pearl Island (Hong Kong)
- Pearl Island (Washington)
- The Pearl-Qatar
- Pearl Island, a small island of New Zealand
- An alternative name of Perl Island, Alaska

== See also ==
- Pearl Islands
