= Fung Seng Enterprises =

Fung Seng Enterprises Limited 豐盛創建企業有限公司
- Company type: Listed company
- Industry: Conglomerate
- Headquarters: Hong Kong, People's Republic of China
- Area served: Hong Kong, Mainland China, Thailand, Vietnam, Macau
- Key people: Chairman: Mr. Doo Wai Hoi, William JP
- Website: Fung Seng Enterprises Limited

Fung Seng Enterprises
- Traditional Chinese: 豐盛創建企業有限公司
- Simplified Chinese: 丰盛创建企业有限公司
Transcriptions
Standard Mandarin
- Hanyu Pinyin: Fēngshèng Chuàngjiàn Qǐyè Yǒuxiàngōngsī
Yue: Cantonese
- Jyutping: fung1 sing6 cong3 gin3 kei5 jip6 jau5 haan6 gung1 si1

Fung Seng Enterprises Limited (FSE, Chinese: 豐盛創建企業有限公司) is a leading conglomerate in the services industry, employing nearly 13,000 people in Hong Kong.

FSE has three major competencies: facilities management services, electrical & mechanical engineering services and financial services within which several business units specialize, including Property Management, Security Service, Cleaning, Laundry, Landscaping, Electrical & Mechanical Engineering, Trading of Building Materials, and Insurance Consultancy.

NWS Holdings announced on 11 June 2010 that they had entered into an agreement with Fung Seng Enterprises Limited to dispose of certain subsidiary companies engaged in service businesses (NWS Engineering Group Ltd) for a total consideration of HK $888.5 million.

Its head office is in Kowloon Bay.

== Business areas ==
Fung Seng Enterprises Limited (FSE) in three segments: facilities management services, electrical & mechanical engineering services and financial services. The other business includes the insurance business, project consultancy services, and the sales of building materials and pre-cast structure.

Fung Seng Enterprises Limited (FSE) in five geographical segments: Hong Kong, Mainland China, Macau, Vietnam and Thailand.

== Notable Companies in Hong Kong ==
- Urban Property Management
- Kiu Lok Management Company
- General Security (HK)
- Waihong Environmental Services
- Hong Kong Island Landscape Company
- FSE Engineering Group
- Extensive Trading Company
- Nova Insurance Consultants
