= FSE Engineering Group =

FSE Engineering Group Ltd (FSEE) 豐盛機電工程集團有限公司
- Company type: Limited Company
- Industry: Engineering
- Founded: 1997
- Headquarters: Hong Kong, People's Republic of China
- Area served: China, Hong Kong, Macau, Thailand, Vietnam, Singapore
- Key people: Director: Mr. Poon Lock Kee
- Services: Electrical & Mechanical Engineering Services
- Revenue: 2166 million HKD
- Number of employees: 1389
- Parent: Fung Seng Enterprises
- Website: FSE Engineering Group Ltd (FSEE)

FSE Engineering Group Ltd (FSEE) (Chinese: 豐盛機電工程集團有限公司) is an Electrical Engineering & Mechanical Engineering business company. It was established in 1997 when its predecessor, NWS Engineering Group Ltd, sold out to Fung Seng Enterprises. Now, FSE Engineering Group Ltd (FSEE) is the largest E&M Building Services engineering companies in Hong Kong

== History ==
NWS Holdings announced on 11 June 2010 that the Group had entered into an agreement with Fung Seng Enterprises Limited to dispose of certain subsidiary companies (NWS Engineering Group Ltd) engaged in service businesses for a total consideration of HK$888.5 million.

It is operated mainly under the subsidiaries of Fung Seng Enterprises Limited (FSE). FSE Engineering Group Ltd (FSEE), previously named NWS Engineering Group Ltd, mainly comprising Young's Engineering Company Limited, Majestic Engineering Company Limited and Far East Engineering Services Limited.

== Services areas ==
FSE Engineering Group Ltd income is mostly from the projects in the government, public organizations and large private corporations.

It can provided Initial Consultation, Design & Value Engineering, Supply & Installation, Energy Audit, Testing & Commissioning, Operation & Maintenance, Facility Management etc. in HVAC, Fire Services, Plumbing & Drainage, Lighting, Power & ELV, Building Automation, Acoustic & Water Treatment and Clean Room engineering field.

This company encompass a wide range of building types and facilities including office, shopping mall, convention and exhibition center, bank, hotel, residential, university, hospital, recreational, airport, power plant, container and ferry terminal, industrial and environments

== Projects ==
- Hong Kong Museum of Art
- Hong Kong Convention and Exhibition Centre Atrium Link Extension
- Hong Kong Convention and Exhibition Centre Extension (Phases I and II)
- Hong Kong Stadium Redevelopment
- Hong Kong Disneyland Resort - Back of House Facilities, Hollywood Hotel and Tomorrow land
- Hong Kong Electric Headquarters
- Hong Kong Institute of Biotechnology Complex
- Hong Kong International Airport - Cathay Pacific City, Sea Rescue Berth and Seawater Pumping Equipment
- Macau Grand Hyatt, City of Dreams, Macau
- Macau International Airport - Passenger Terminal Building
- Mandarin Oriental Macau - Hotel and Services Apartment
- Singapore Esplanade Mall
- Singapore Ritz Carlton Millenia
- Thailand All Seasons Place Phase 1, Bangkok
- Thailand Krisda Plaza Ph I, Bangkok
- Thailand SV City, Bangkok
- Vietnam New World Hotel Saigon, Ho Chi Minh City
- Vietnam Riverside Renaissance Hotel, Ho Chi Minh City
- Vietnam Thuan Kieu Plaza, Ho Chi Minh City
