= Douglas Rock =

Uninhabited island of Hong Kong

德己利士礁
- Interactive map of Douglas Rock

Geography
- Location: Between Lantau Island and Hong Kong Island
- Coordinates: 22°17′26.9196″N 114°4′10.9272″E

Administration
- Hong Kong
- District: Islands

Demographics
- Population: Unpopulated

Douglas Rock
- Traditional Chinese: 德己利士礁
Transcriptions
Yue: Cantonese
- Yale Romanization: Dāk géi leih sih jīu
- Jyutping: Dak^{1} gei^{2} lei^{6} si^{6} ziu^{1}

Douglas Rock (Chinese: 德己利士礁) is a rock located between Lantau Island and Hong Kong Island, Hong Kong. Administratively it belongs to the Islands District. There are currently no residents on the island.
