= Loafer (disambiguation) =

A loafer is a type of shoe.

Loafer may refer to:

== Film and television ==
- Loafer (1973 film), Bollywood film starring Dharmendra and Mumtaz
- Loafer (1996 film), Bollywood film starring Anil Kapoor and Juhi Chawla
- Loafer (2011 film), Oriya film starring Babushan, Archita Sahu and Budhaditya
- Loafer (2013 film), Nepali film
- Loafer (2015 film), Telugu film starring Varun Tej, Disha Patani, Revathi and Posani Krishna Murali

== People ==
- Loafer Band, a band of Sioux people

== See also ==
- LowFER, low-frequency experimental radio
- Slacker, a person who habitually avoids work
- Great Plains wolf, also known as a loafer
