= Shek Ngau Chau =

Uninhabited island of Hong Kong

Coordinates: 22.466062°N 114.427797°E

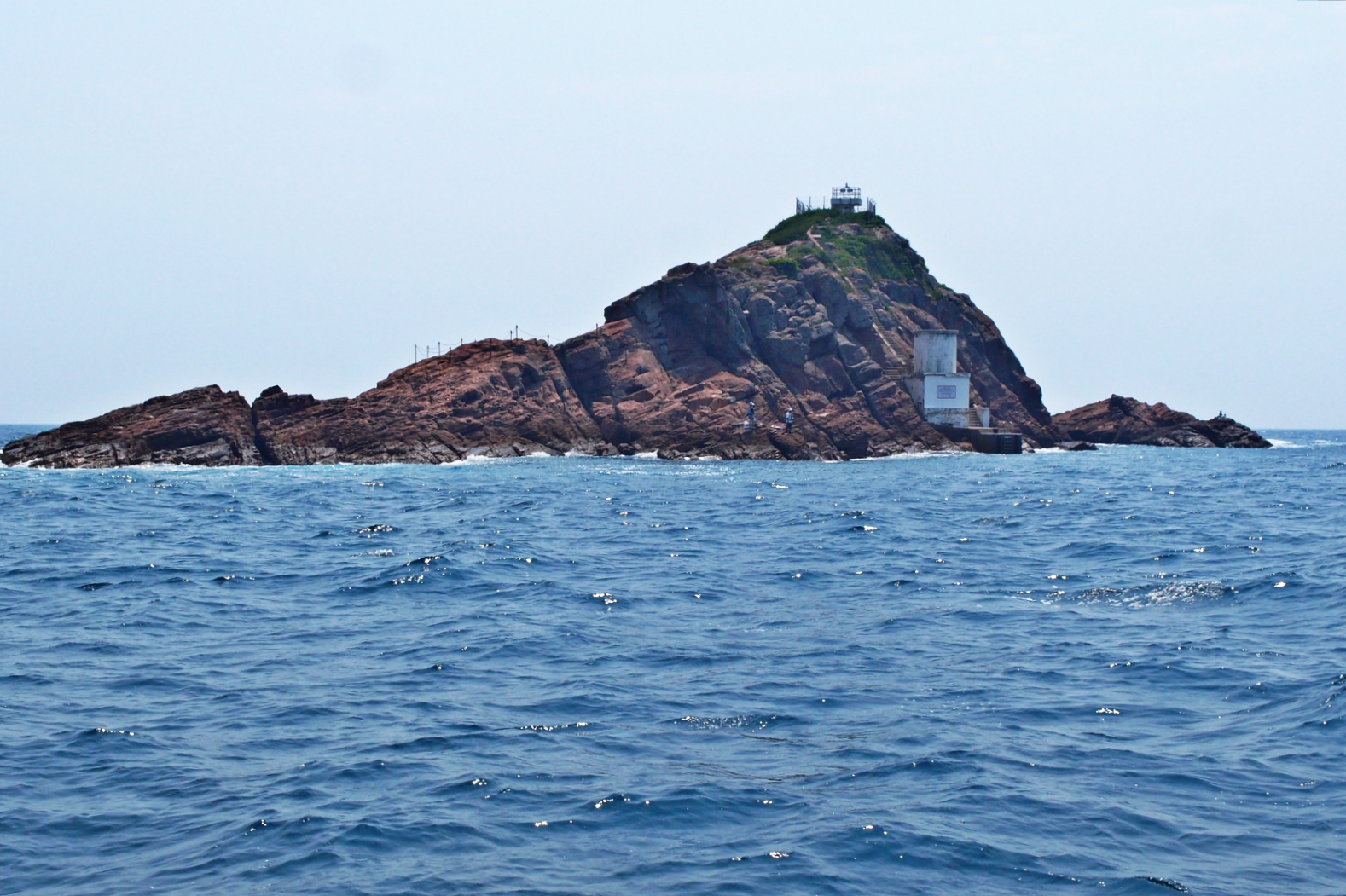
Shek Ngau Chau.

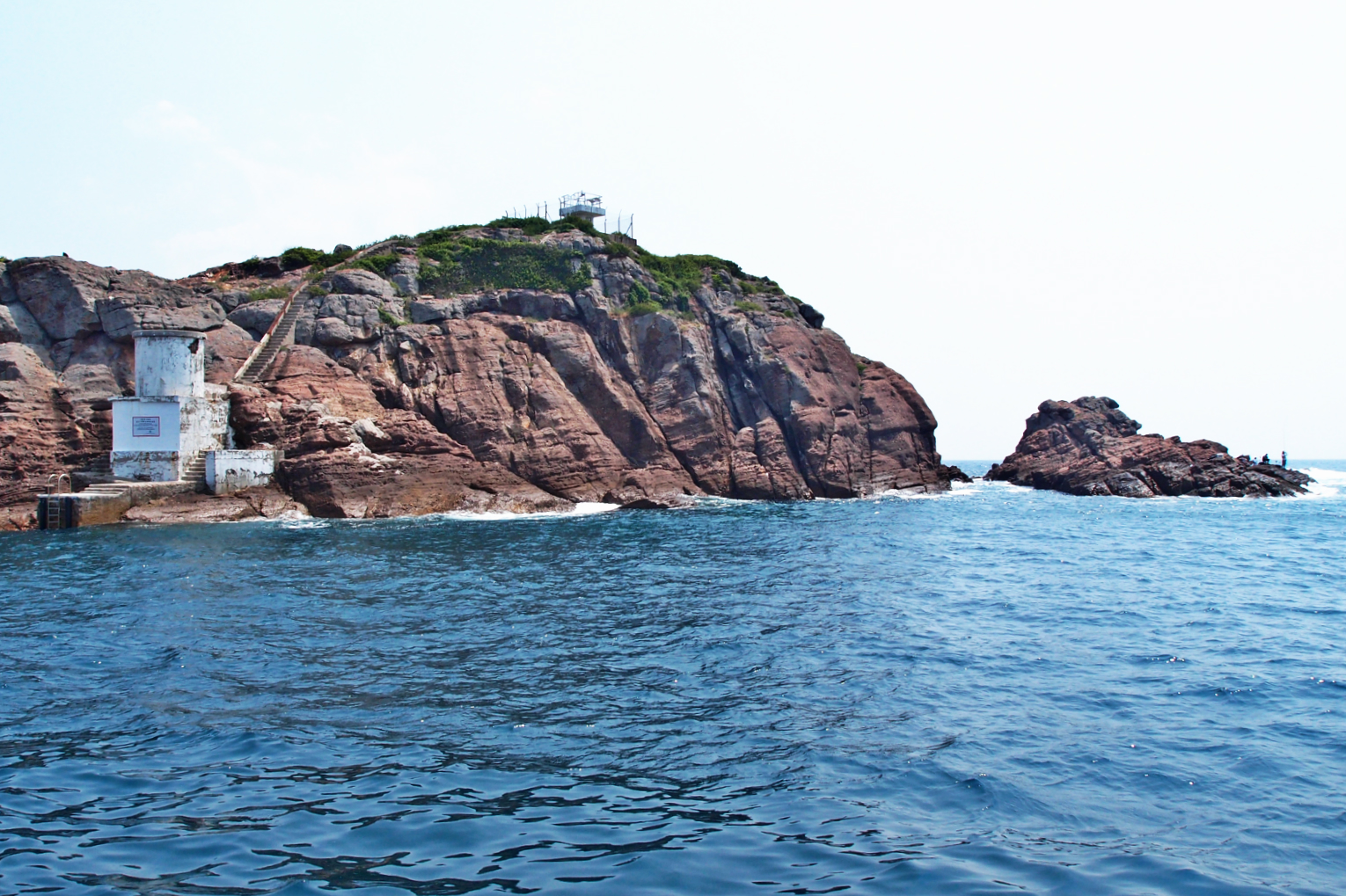
Shek Ngau Chau.

Shek Ngau Chau (Chinese: 石牛洲, formerly Gau Tau 㞗頭 - literally, "penis head") is an uninhabited island of Hong Kong within Tai Po District. It has an area of 0.92 hectares (2.3 acres) and is located in Mirs Bay, in the north-east of the New Territories.

== Buildings ==
The island features a light beacon, a pier, a one-storey hut and stairs to the peak. They were built by the Marine Department as aids to navigation.

== Conservation ==
The island is the most important breeding ground for terns in Hong Kong. It was designated as a Site of Special Scientific Interest in 2005.
