= Chau Tsai (Tsing Yi) =

Former island of Hong Kong

Coordinates: 22.3287°N 114.0996°E

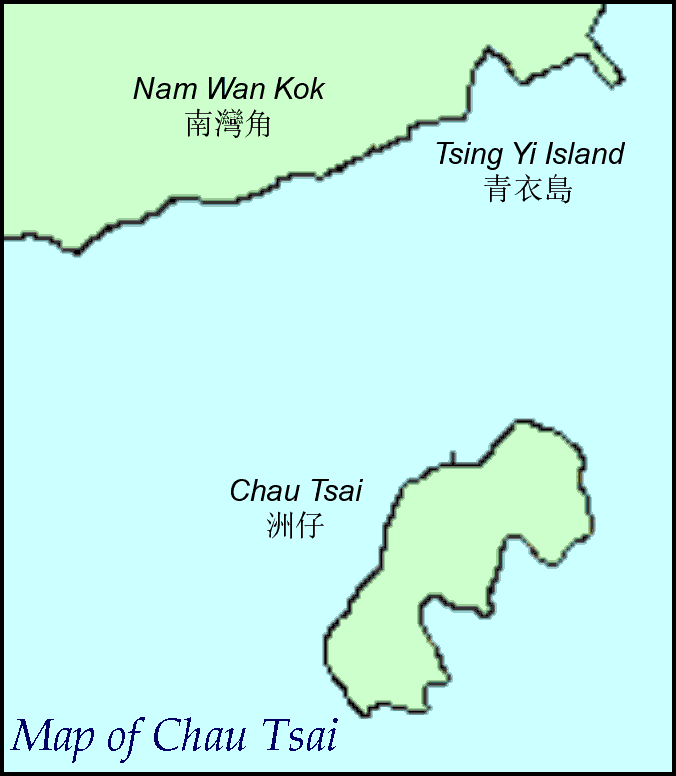
Map of Chan Tsai and Nam Wan Kok, Tsing Yi Islands before reclamation

Chau Tsai (Chinese: 洲仔) was a small island off the southern shore of Nam Wan Kok on Tsing Yi Island, Hong Kong. It was also known as Chun Fa Rock (Chung Hue Rock), or Chung Hue Shik (春花石) in some historical documents. The island was merged with Tsing Yi Island by land reclamation for the construction of the CRC Oil Storage Depot.

== See also ==
- List of islands and peninsulas of Hong Kong
- List of places in Hong Kong
