= La Ka Chau =

Former island of Hong Kong

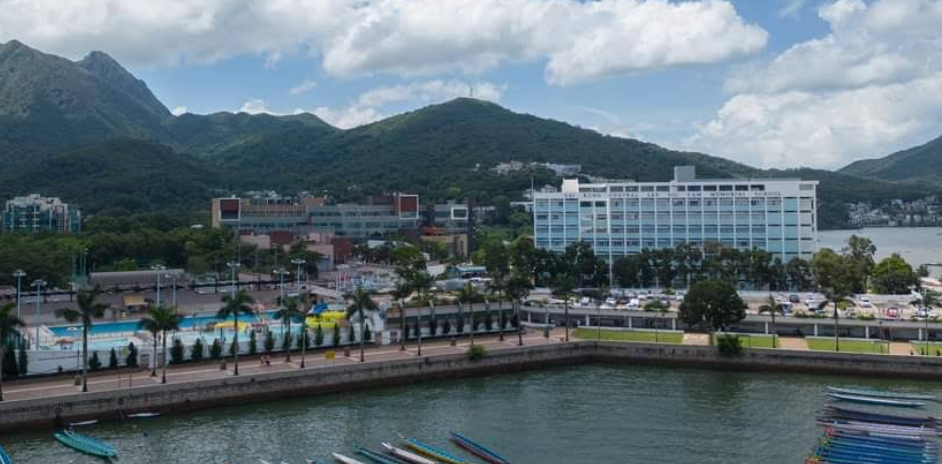
A photo of the former land of La Ka Chau, now part of Sai Kung. Shown from Sai Kung Waterfront Promenade.

La Ka Chau (Chinese: 勒加洲; pinyin: Lēi jiā zhōu) also known as Nga Ying Chau (Chinese: 牙鷹洲; pinyin: Yá yīng zhōu) is a former island in Hong Kong, China located in the northeastern part of Sai Kung. The island was connected to Sai Kung when the land reclamation was carried out in the area in the late 1970s and early 1980s to make the Sai Kung Waterfront. It is now part of a public car park in Sai Kung.
