= Hoi Sham Island =

Former island of Hong Kong

Coordinates: 22.314813°N 114.192072°E

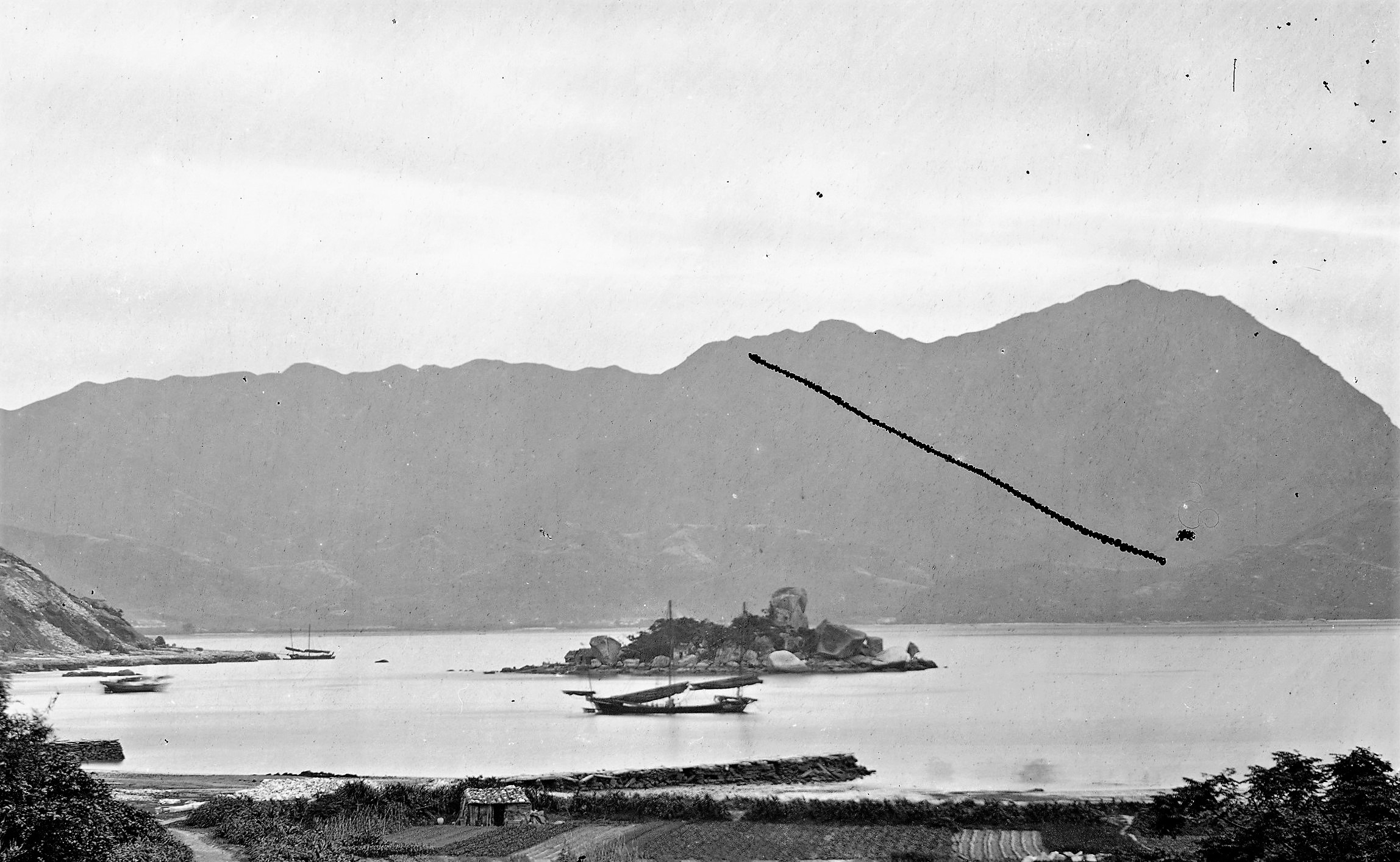
Hoi Sham Island photographed by John Thomson in 1870. Kowloon Peak is visible in the background.

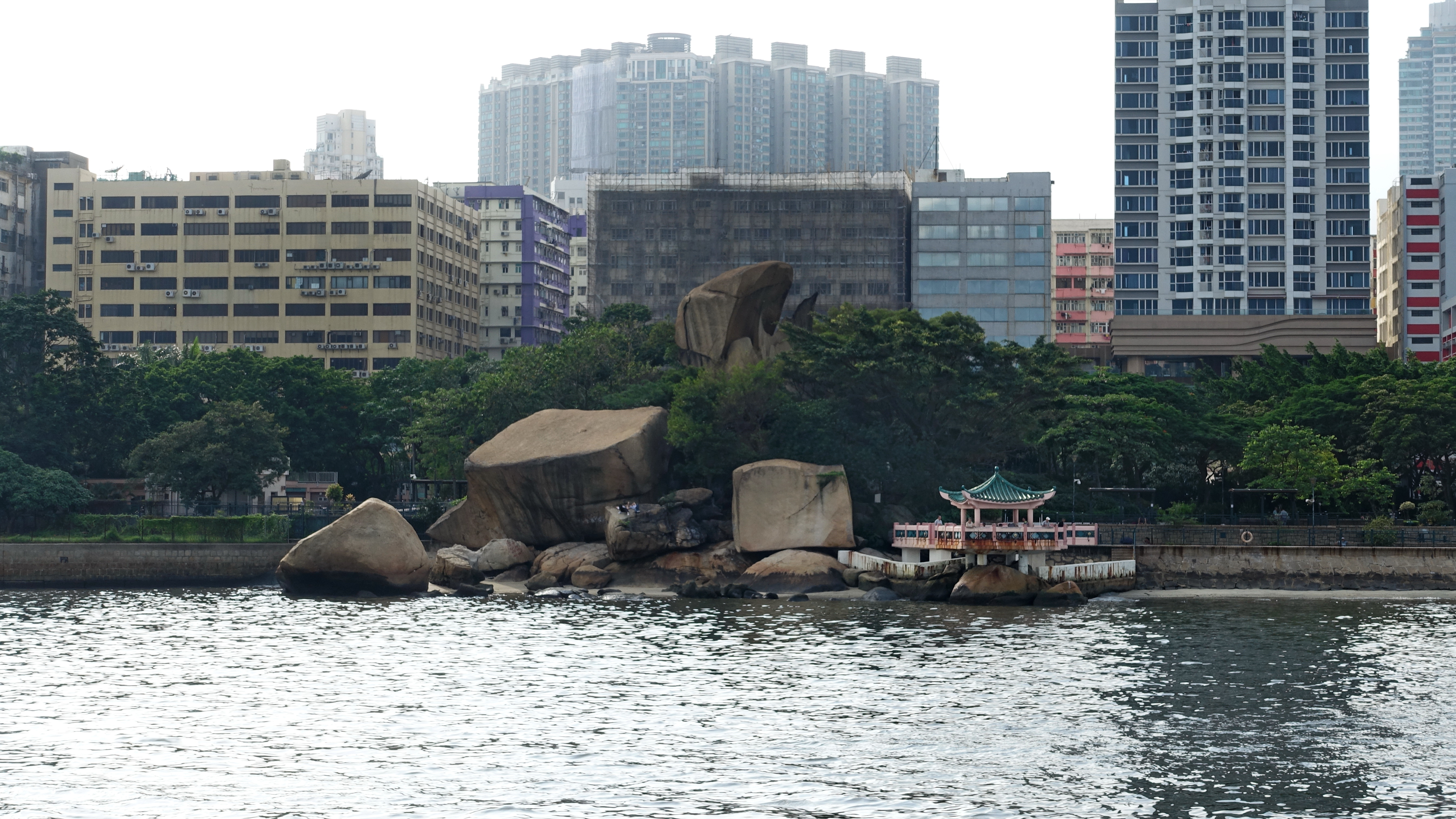
Hoi Sham Park with rocks and pavilion, viewed from Kowloon Bay.

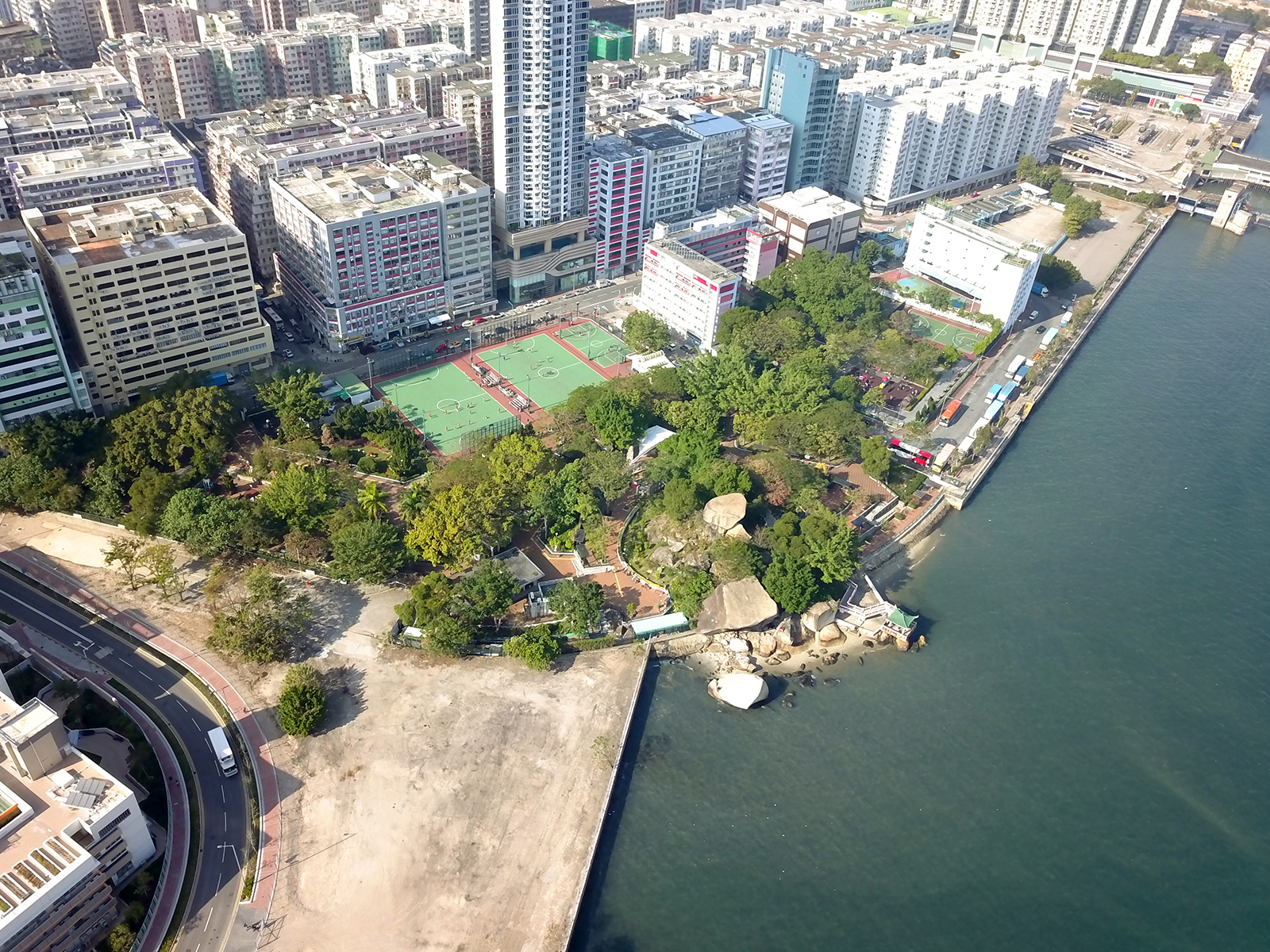
Hoi Sham Park

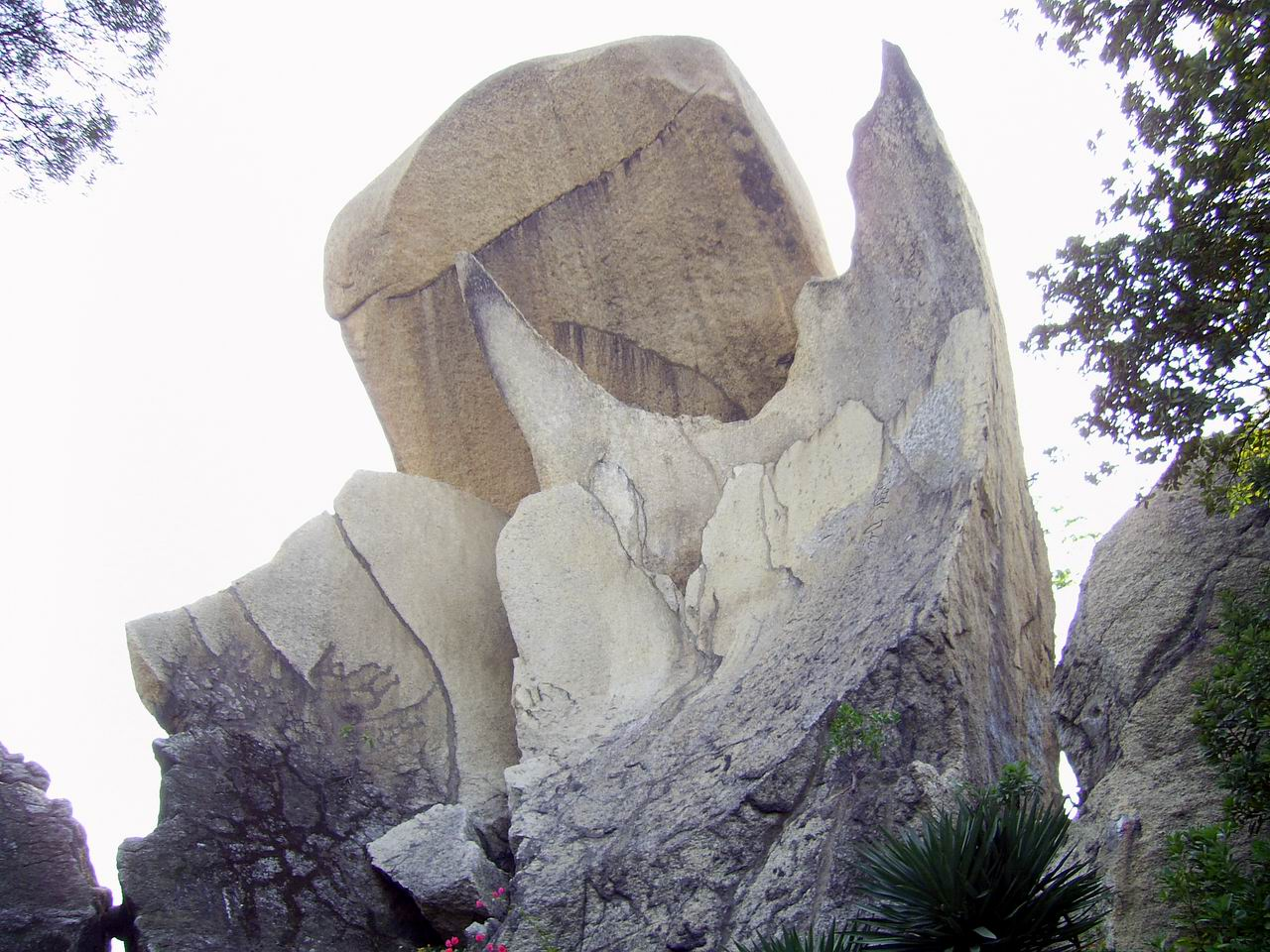
Fishtail Rock in Hoi Sham Park.

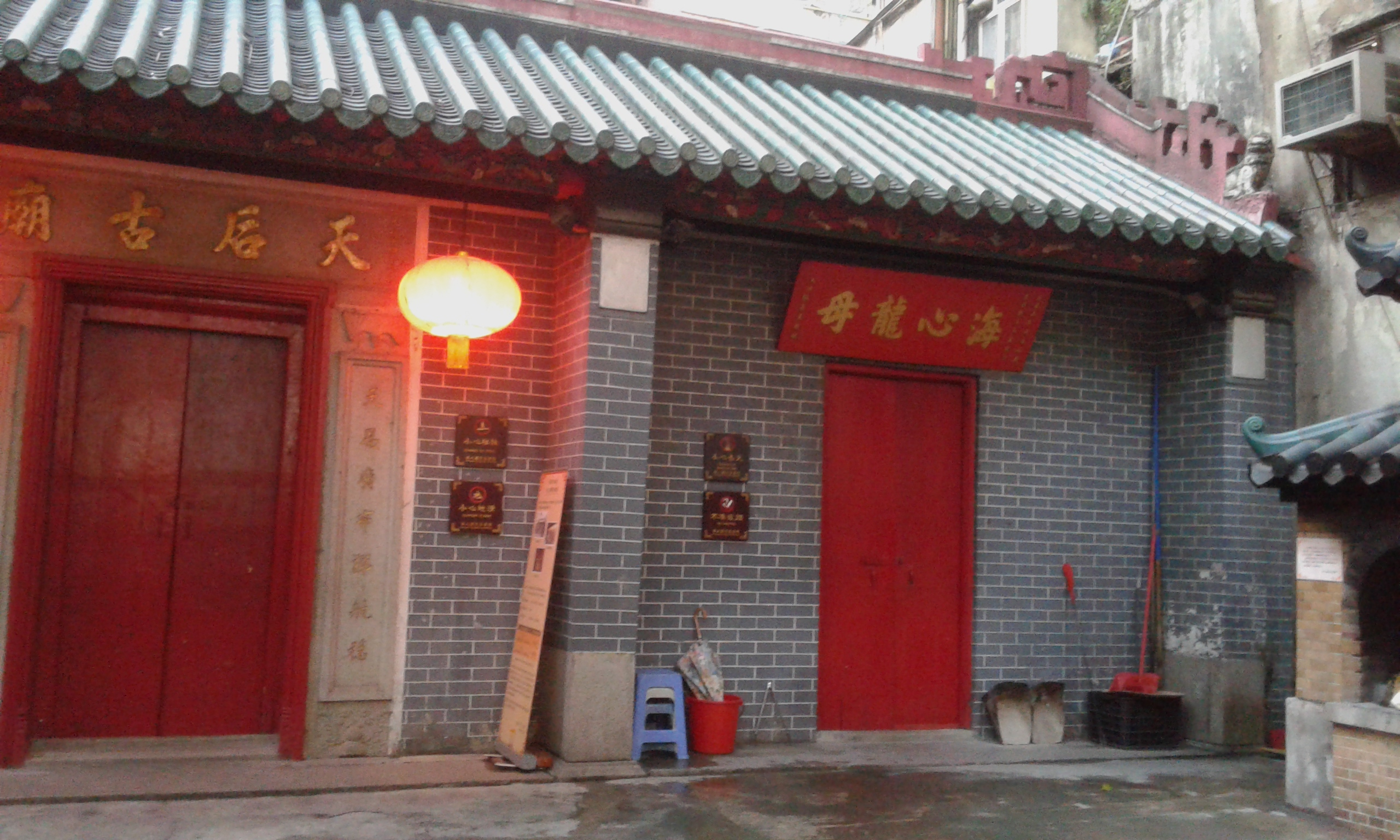
To Kwa Wan Tin Hau Temple. The hall on the right is dedicated to Lung Mo, and houses her statue. It was moved there from the former temple on Hoi Sham Island.

Hoi Sham Island (Chinese: 海心島; lit. 'island in the middle of the sea'), also called To Kwa Wan Island (土瓜灣島), was an island in Kowloon Bay off the coast of To Kwa Wan, Kowloon Peninsula in Hong Kong. It was connected to the mainland as a consequence of land reclamation, and it is now part of Hoi Sham Park (海心公園).

== History ==
The island was known by the locals for its distinctive shape of the rocks, some of them were given names, such as Hoi Sham Rock (海心石) and Fishtail Rock (魚尾石), and the island was believed to be a place of good feng shui. A Lung Mo Temple (龍母廟), also called Hoi Sham Temple (海心廟), was originally built on the island at the foot of the rock.

Upon reclamation of the bay of To Kwa Wan in the 1960s, the island was connected to the urban To Kwa Wan area, and was converted into Hoi Sham Park in 1972. The Fishtail Rock and Hoi Sham Rock were preserved and are displayed in the park.

The temple was demolished in 1964 and the statue of Lung Mo (龍母; 'Dragon Mother') was relocated to the nearby Tin Hau Temple, built in 1885 and located at the corner of Ha Heung Road (下鄉道) and Lok Shan Road (落山道). In this temple, the statue of the Lung Mo is on the altar of the left bay (right side when viewed from the front).

== See also ==
- List of islands and peninsulas of Hong Kong
