= Channel Rock (Hong Kong) =

Former big rock in Hong Kong

Coordinates: 22°18′30″N 114°12′50″E

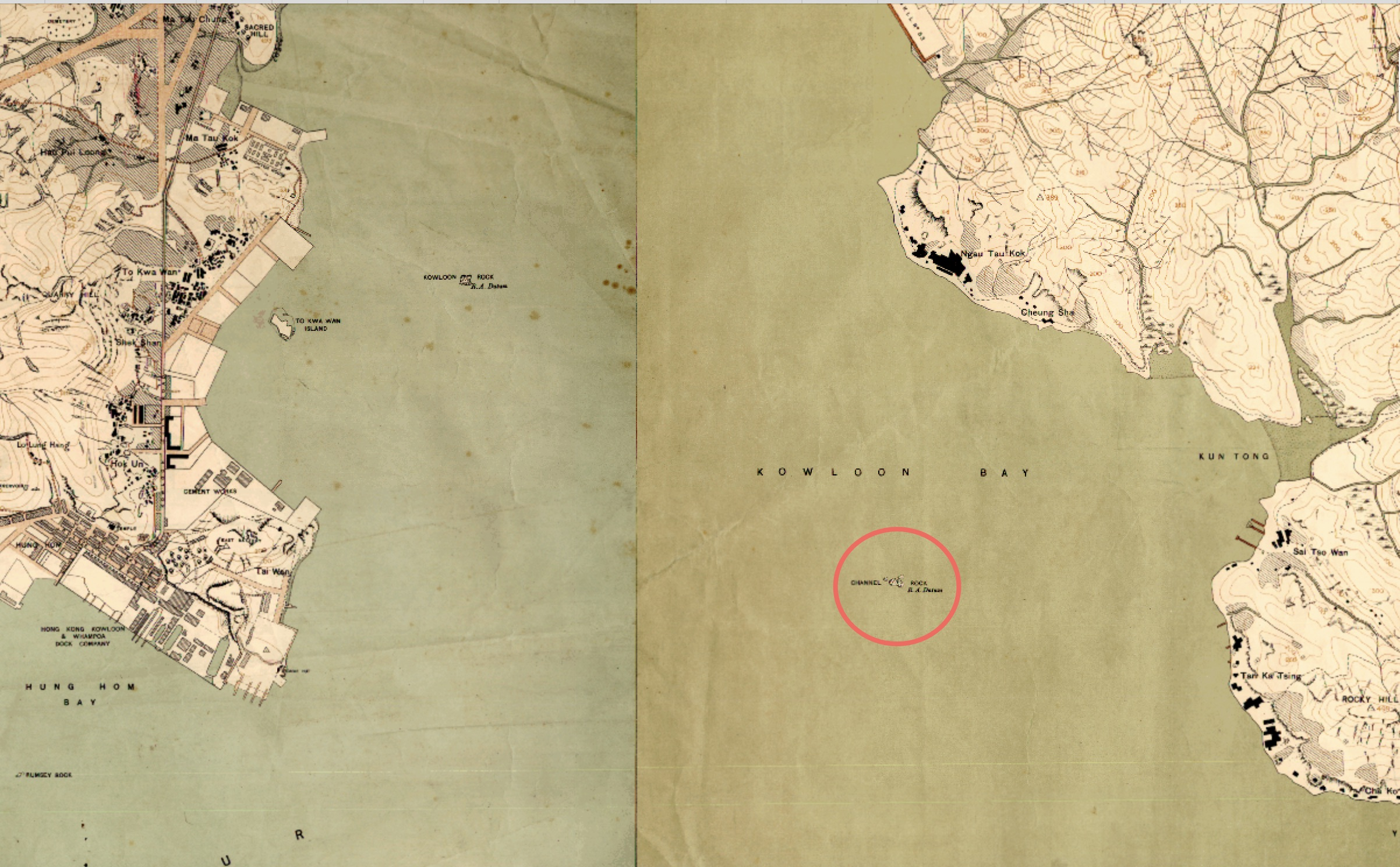
Channel Rock as shown in a 1924 map, circled in red.

Channel Rock (Chinese: 海峽石) was a big rock in the midst of Kowloon Bay, in the east Victoria Harbour, Hong Kong, opposite Kwun Tong Ferry Pier. It was incorporated into the extension of the runway of Kai Tak Airport. A navigation light was built on the rock in 1921, but was demolished with the extension of the Kai Tak runway.

A 1977 survey of molluscs identified at Channel Rock included Siphonaria corallina, Patelloida toloensis, and Collisella cellanica.
