= Pearl Island (Hong Kong) =

Island near Tuen Mun, Hong Kong

Coordinates: 22.3652°N 113.9894°E

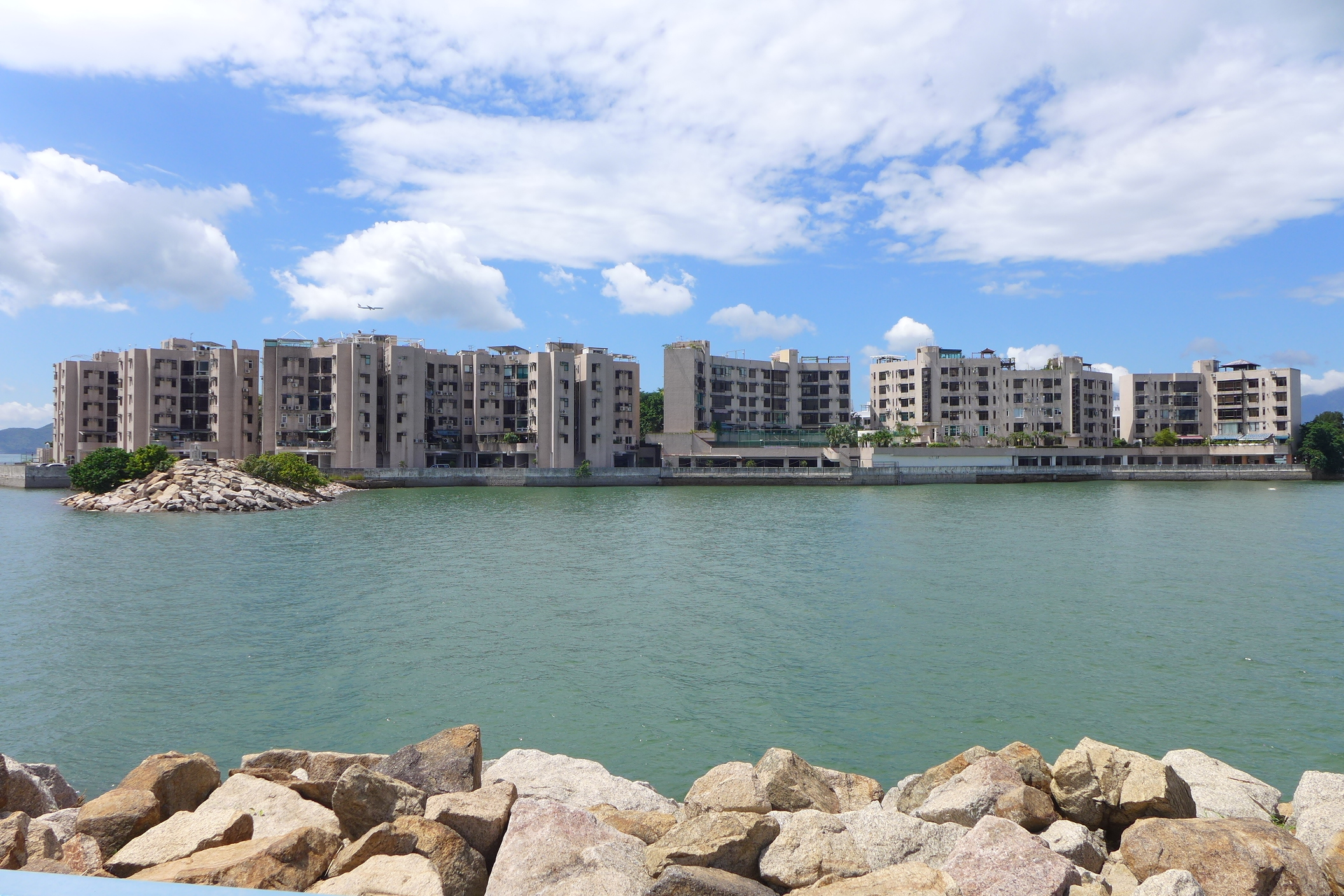
Pearl Island Garden (龍珠島花園, a private housing estate on Pearl Island.

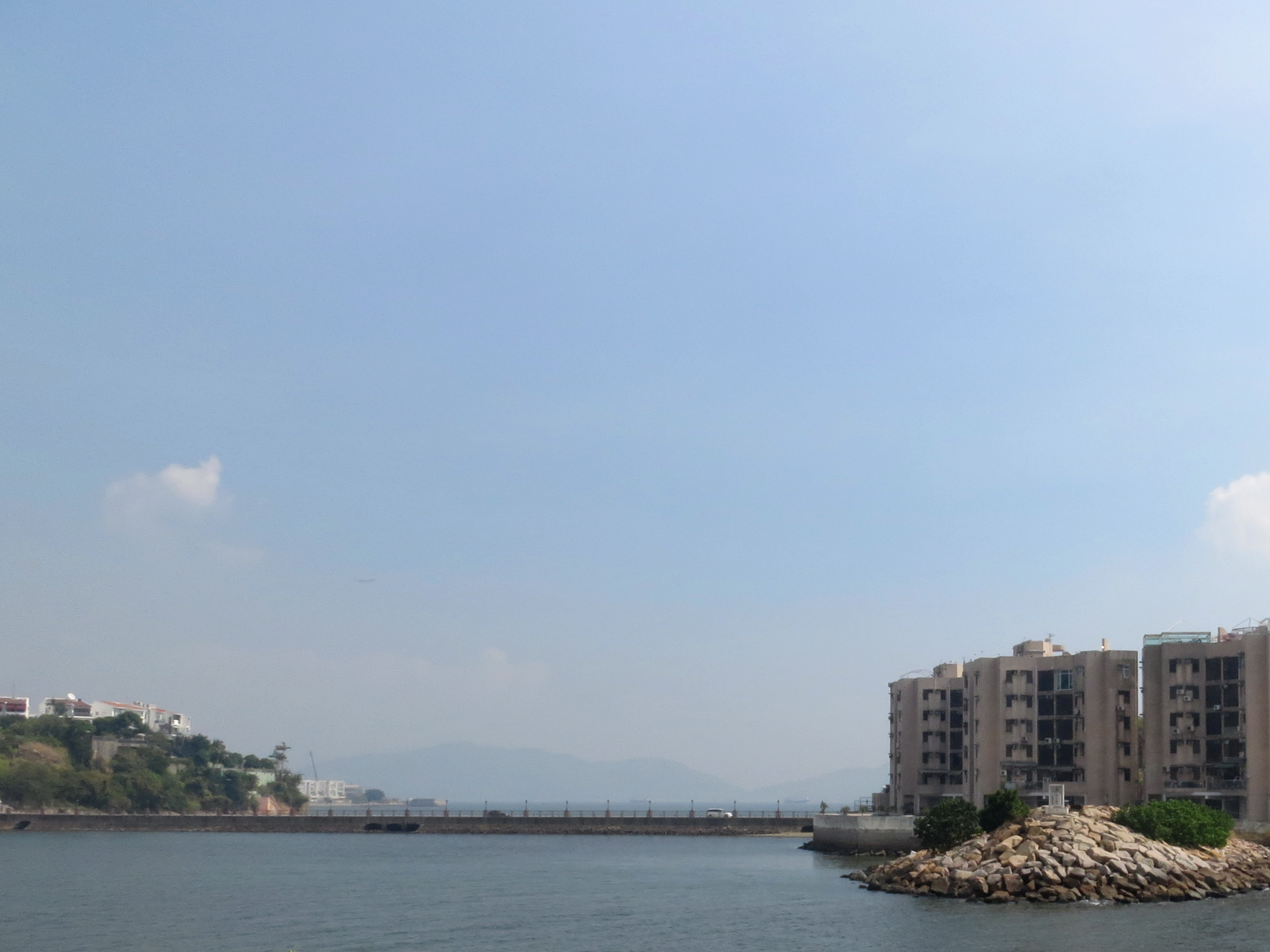
Tsing Lung Road (青龍路) connecting Pearl Island (right) to the mainland (left).

Pearl Island (Chinese: 龍珠島), formerly known as (琵琶洲) in Chinese, is a small island southeast of Tuen Mun in Hong Kong.

== Administration ==
Pearl Island is located in Sam Shing constituency of the Tuen Mun District Council. It was formerly represented by Michael Mo Kwan-tai, who was elected in the 2019 elections until July 2021.

== Features ==
There are villa-type housing on the island and a road is connecting the island to the mainland. It is now part of the Gold Coast residential area in Hong Kong.

== See also ==
- List of islands and peninsulas of Hong Kong
