= Loaf Island =

- Interactive map of Loaf Island

Geography
- Location: Massacre Bay, Aleutian Islands
- Coordinates: 52°50′11″N 173°12′26″E
- Archipelago: Near Islands
- Area: 0.15 km^{2} (0.058 sq mi)
- Length: 0.68 km (0.423 mi)
- Width: 0.315 km (0.1957 mi)

Administration
- United States
- State: Alaska
- Census area: Aleutians West Census Area

Demographics
- Population: 0

Loaf Island is a small satellite of Attu Island in the Near Islands group at the extreme western end of the Aleutian Islands, Alaska. Loaf Island is situated in Massacre Bay on the southeast side of Attu. It was named by the U.S. Army during its occupation of Attu during World War II.
