= Mong Chau =

Former island of Hong Kong

Coordinates: 22.3438°N 114.1229°E

Mong Chau (Chinese: 芒洲) was an island off South Kwai Chung, in the Rambler Channel, Hong Kong. The island was incorporated in the reclamation for the Chung Container Port (present-day Kwai Tsing Container Terminals). It was located between what is now Container Terminals 3 and 4.

Also known as Ballast Island, Mong Chau had a fort and customs station.
