= Loaf Rock =

Rock lying west of Biscoe Point in the Palmer Archipelago, Antarctica

Coordinates: 64°48′S 63°55′W

Loaf Rock is a rock lying 3 nautical miles (6 km) west of Biscoe Point, off the southwest coast of Anvers Island in the Palmer Archipelago, Antarctica. It was surveyed by the British Naval Hydrographic Survey Unit in 1956–57, and was so named by the UK Antarctic Place-Names Committee in 1958 because the rock is shaped like a flat loaf of bread.
