= Kowloon Rock =

Island in Hong Kong

Coordinates: 22°18′59.2″N 114°11′56.0″E

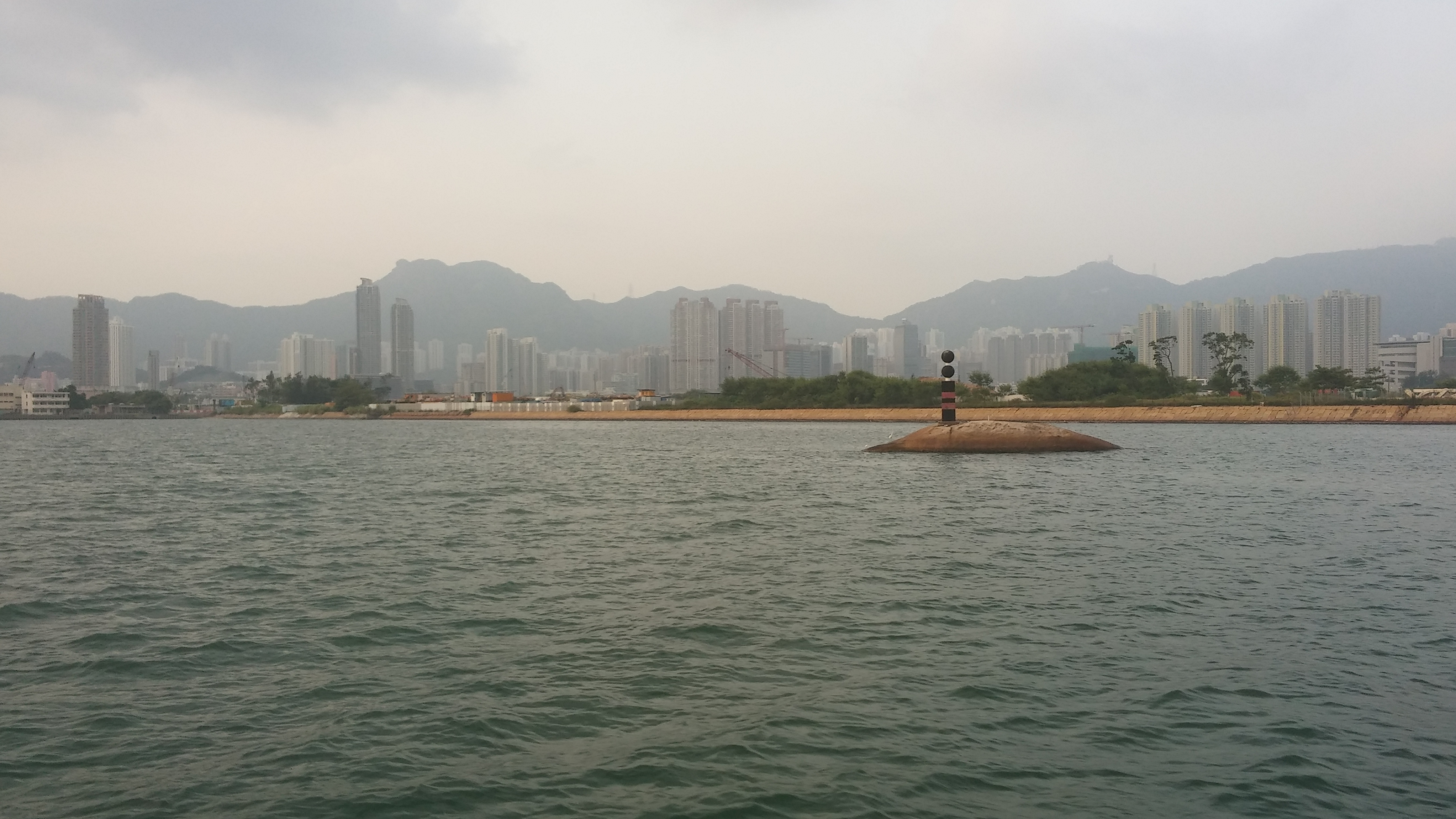
Kowloon Rock

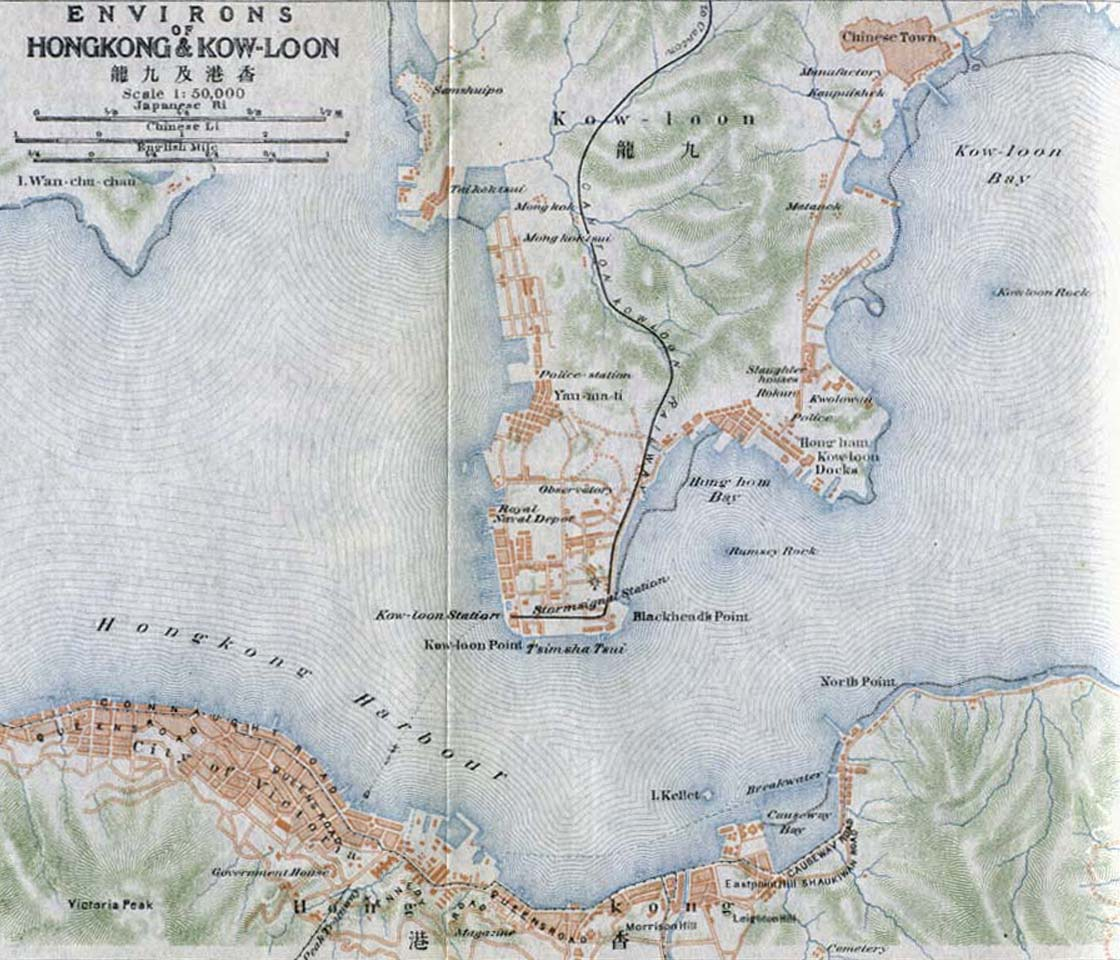
1915 map showing the location of Kowloon Rock

Kowloon Rock (Chinese: 九龍石) is an island in the middle of Kowloon Bay in Hong Kong, near the runway of the former Kai Tak Airport. Administratively, it is part of Kowloon City District.

The island is three metres by two meters in size. The rock has no vegetation, as it is a rock. An isolated danger daymark is installed to alert passing vessels.

The island is now sheltered in the To Kwa Wan typhoon shelter by a dyke across the bay.
