= Sai Kung Town =

Sai Kung Town 西貢市中心, 西貢市, 西貢墟
- Neighbourhood
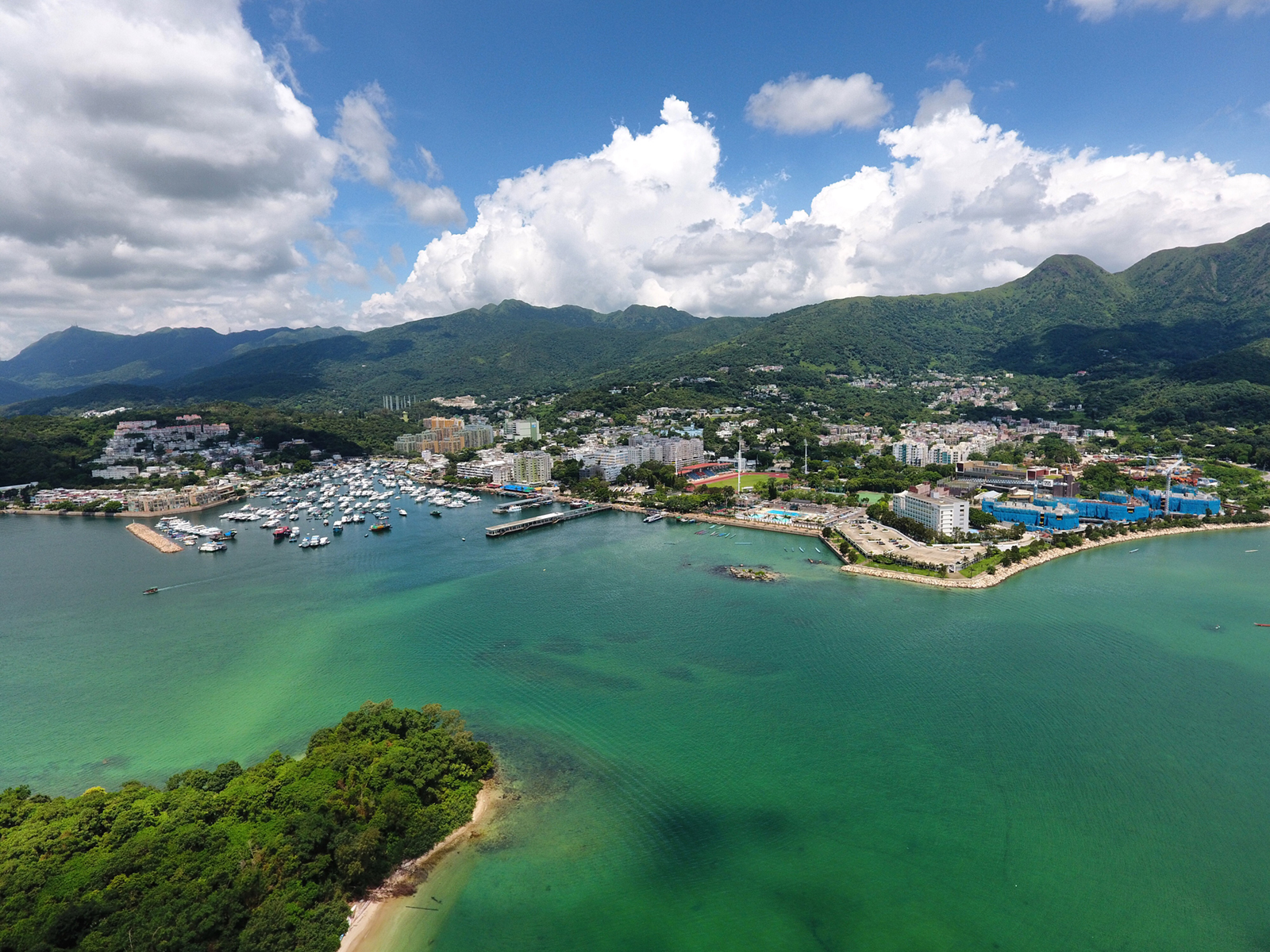
- Aerial view of Sai Kung Town (2017)
- Etymology: Sai Kung
- Nickname: Sai Kung town centre
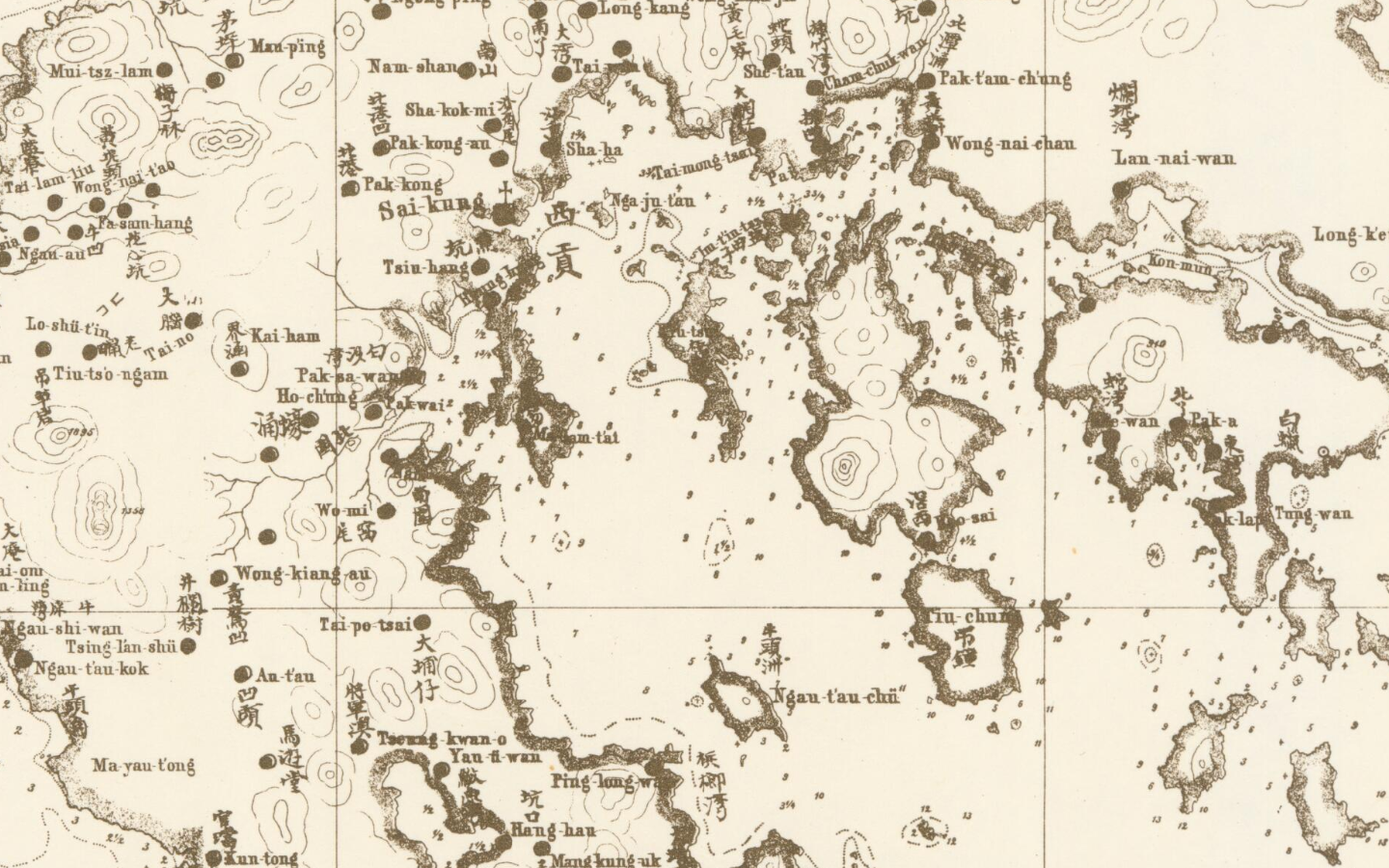
- Map of Xin'an County of 1866 (enlarged), showing the Port Shelter and the area Sai Kung

- Sai Kung Town in Hong Kong
- Coordinates: 22.38140°N 114.27333°E
- Country: China
- SAR: Hong Kong
- Region: New Territories
- District: Sai Kung
- Founded: before 1900s

Population (2011)
  - Total: 11,927
- Census boundary based on Sai Kung Central constituency, not based on OZP
- Time zone: UTC+8 (Hong Kong Time)

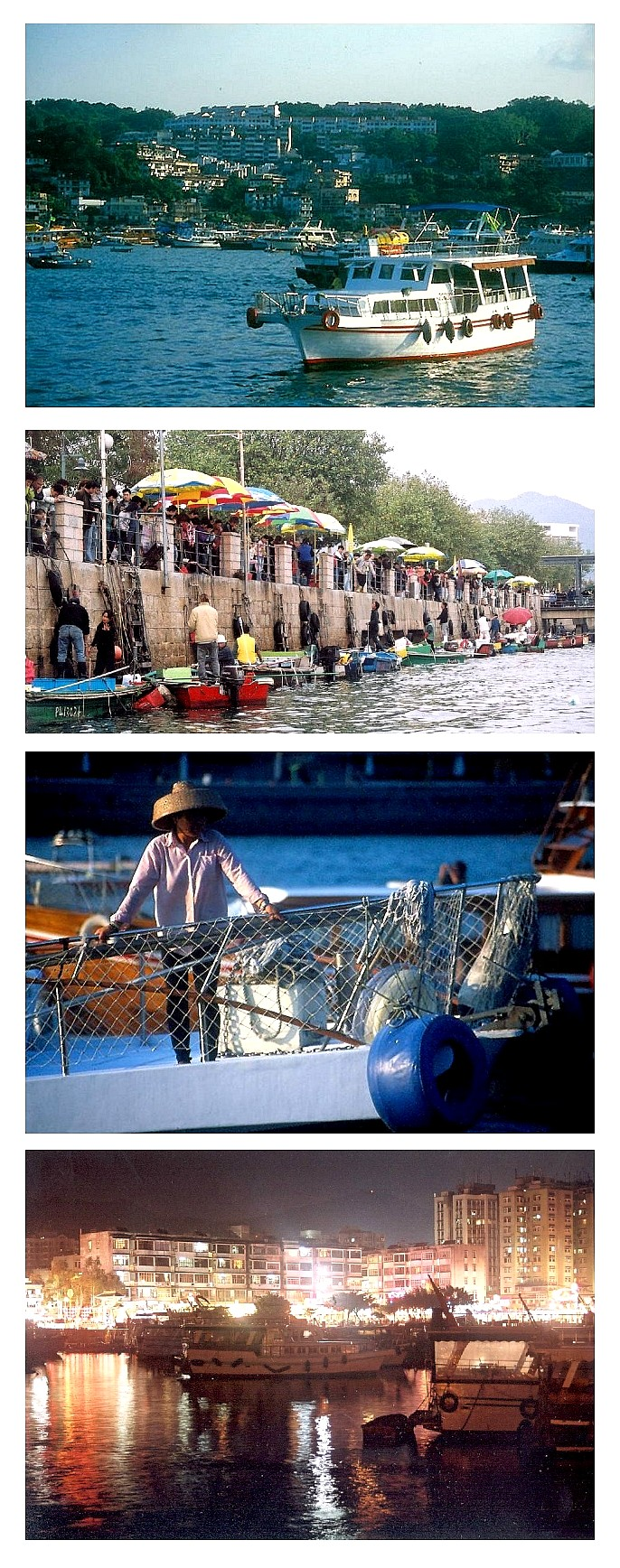
Scenes from Sai Kung Town

Sai Kung Town (Chinese: 西貢市), or simply Sai Kung (Chinese: 西貢), is a town on the Sai Kung Peninsula facing Sai Kung Hoi (Inner Port Shelter, part of Sai Kung District) in the New Territories, Hong Kong. Sai Kung is the central hub of nearby surrounding villages, and, hence the name, may also refer to the areas in its immediate surroundings.

== Name ==
Sai Kung was established as a market town for the surrounding villages as 西貢墟 around 100 years ago. Nowadays, officially, the town is more often referred to as 西貢市. Despite its modern transliteration, 市 (usually meaning 'city' in Classical Chinese), 墟 and 市 both mean 'market'. The word 市 was also used by the colonial British government to transliterate the word 'town'; for example, Tai Po Town.

The name Sai Kung (Chinese: 西貢) first appeared in Western publications dating back to the early 1900s, but the settlement was, at the time, described only as "the village of Sai Kung". Sai Kung also probably first appeared on a map of Xin'an County, made by Simeone Volonteri, in 1866. The origins of the name Sai Kung are relatively unknown. Moreover, the accuracy of Volonteri's map, in general, has been criticised, particularly regarding specific place names—such as Green Hill, which, historically, was known as Tuen Mun Hill.

== History ==
According to Professor David Faure, no market was recorded, where modern-day Sai Kung District is located, in the Qing dynasty's Xin'an Xianzhi (Chinese: 新安縣志; lit. 'Gazetteer of the Xin'an County'), neither in the Kangxi edition (1688) nor in the Jiaqing edition (1819). Instead, Faure stated that, due to inaccessibility of land-based transport, Leung Shuen Wan (High Island) was probably developed into a moorage inlet in the 18th century. Shops were opened on Leung Shuen Wan (though not within the modern bounds of Sai Kung Town), as well as a Tin Hau Temple, for the boat-living people of the area. Objects uncovered at the temple date back to the year 1741 CE, of the western calendar.

Additionally, Prof. Faure stated that the market(s) on Sai Kung Peninsula was (were) founded before the signing of the Convention for the Extension of Hong Kong Territory (1898), which ceded the entire peninsula to the Hong Kong colony as the New Territories and New Kowloon. In the early 1900s, the Sai Kung market had expanded to 50 shops, plus four boat-builders' maintenance sheds. Furthermore, a smaller market of around 18 shops operated in Hang Hau, which became part of the developed area of Tseung Kwan O New Town (not part of Sai Kung Town).

There were no proper educational institutions or other schools on Sai Kung Peninsula at that time, as traditional learning establishments were located in the smaller settlements. However, the Catholic Church of Hong Kong had established a primary school there, at the end of the 19th century, which taught a Western curriculum in the market town. The colonial British government also established a police station and a dispensary near the market.

During WWI, ships were required to undergo inspection by the Royal Navy upon entering or prior to leaving Victoria Harbour. The Port Shelter and Sai Kung market town were located outside of the harbour and thus benefited from the policy by becoming places for resupply. A temple, inside Sai Kung market town, also became a local civic centre, such as for the settlement of disputes. The local business owners, who were not from the surrounding villages, even acted as representatives for Sai Kung in Heung Yee Kuk in the 1920s. Heung Yee Kuk represented the interests of the rural villages of the New Territories and was recognized by the colonial government as a consulting institution. However, in the 1930s, the local merchants formed their own chamber of commence and gradually took-over political influence in the market town. Nowadays, however, the Heung Yee Kuk seat for the Sai Kung Central constituency is elected by the local residents of the town through universal suffrage. The rural villages surrounding the town still elect their own representatives to Heung Yee Kuk.

According to another author, Sai Kung market town expanded and grew economically in the 1950s. At the time, much of the world was enforcing an embargo on the newly-established People's Republic of China, and the market town became a place for smuggling goods to the Republic.

Sai Kung town underwent significant expansion during the 1970s, when the High Island Reservoir (and its associated water management schemes) required some villagers and fishermen to be relocated to Sai Kung. This provided new government-funded residential and commercial development in the town centre, and was followed by Tui Min Hoi (literally 'over the harbour')'s development under the government's market town programme.

Before the relocation of Hong Kong International Airport from Kai Tak to Chek Lap Kok, the town was a popular residential area for the airport's and airlines' international employees.

The town is next to Sai Kung Hoi, which was a fishing harbour. The harbour is now a typhoon shelter, where motorized junks, used in the local tourist trade, are moored. These boats can be hired for sightseeing, or for fishing or swimming trips.

== Boundaries ==
The statutory boundaries of the town were developed by the Sai Kung Town Outline Zoning Plan (OZP) in the 2000s, and approved by 2006. However, in elections, the town is served by the constituency of Sai Kung Central, which roughly covers the same area as the OZP.

The statutory boundaries of the town are Hiram's Highway, Po Tung Road and Tai Mong Tsai Road in the north and west. In the south, the town is bordered by the Tsiu Hang Special Area, as well as Pak Sha Wan Peninsula. To the east, the coastline serves as the boundary.

== Climate ==
Climate data for Sai Kung (1994–2020)
Month	Jan	Feb	Mar	Apr	May	Jun	Jul	Aug	Sep	Oct	Nov	Dec	Year
Mean daily maximum °C (°F)	18.0 (64.4)	18.4 (65.1)	20.7 (69.3)	24.4 (75.9)	28.2 (82.8)	30.6 (87.1)	31.5 (88.7)	31.3 (88.3)	30.1 (86.2)	27.4 (81.3)	23.9 (75.0)	19.7 (67.5)	25.3 (77.6)
Daily mean °C (°F)	15.7 (60.3)	16.2 (61.2)	18.5 (65.3)	22.2 (72.0)	25.8 (78.4)	28.2 (82.8)	28.9 (84.0)	28.7 (83.7)	27.7 (81.9)	25.3 (77.5)	21.7 (71.1)	17.3 (63.1)	23.0 (73.4)
Mean daily minimum °C (°F)	13.6 (56.5)	14.3 (57.7)	16.7 (62.1)	20.4 (68.7)	24.0 (75.2)	26.2 (79.2)	26.6 (79.9)	26.4 (79.5)	25.7 (78.3)	23.3 (73.9)	19.6 (67.3)	15.0 (59.0)	21.0 (69.8)
Average precipitation mm (inches)	43.4 (1.71)	32.5 (1.28)	69.6 (2.74)	130.4 (5.13)	350.6 (13.80)	485.0 (19.09)	328.0 (12.91)	377.0 (14.84)	269.4 (10.61)	101.0 (3.98)	43.5 (1.71)	27.8 (1.09)	2,258.2 (88.91)
Average rainy days	5.0	7.0	10.7	11.1	15.4	17.7	15.6	15.4	11.6	5.9	4.7	4.7	124.8
Average relative humidity (%)	74.2	79.2	82.4	84.6	83.9	83.1	81.4	81.8	78.2	73.1	72.7	69	78.6
Source: Hong Kong Observatory (precipitation, rainy days 1994–2017)

The coordinate of the weather station is 22°22′32″N 114°16′28″E.

== Public housing ==
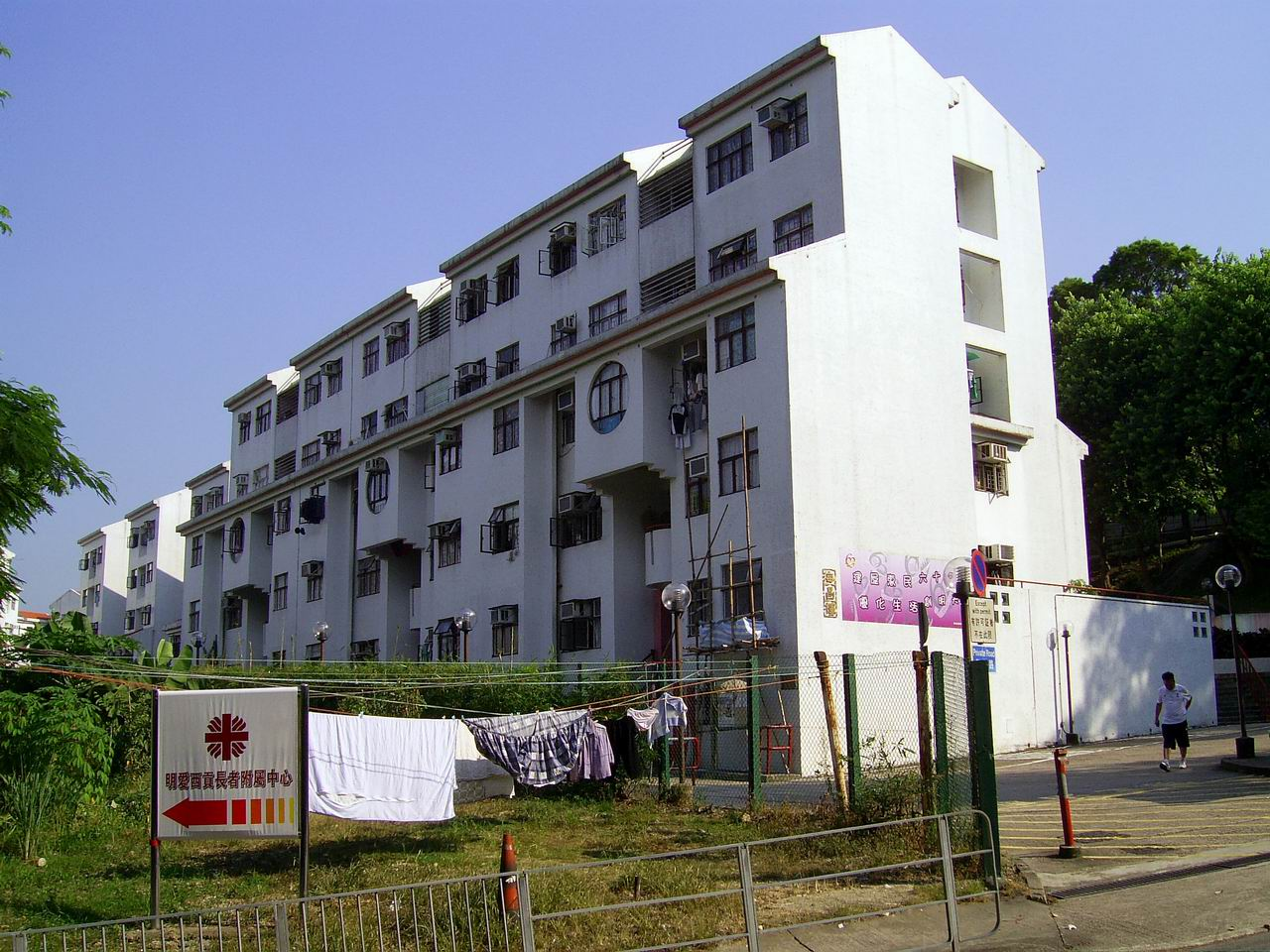
Hoi Cheung Lau, Tui Min Hoi Chuen

Tui Min Hoi Chuen (Chinese: 對面海邨) is a public housing estate in Tui Min Hoi, developed by Hong Kong Housing Society. It is the first rural public housing estate developed by Hong Kong Housing Society. It consists of 4 blocks of 5-storey buildings completed in 1984, 1985 and 1986.

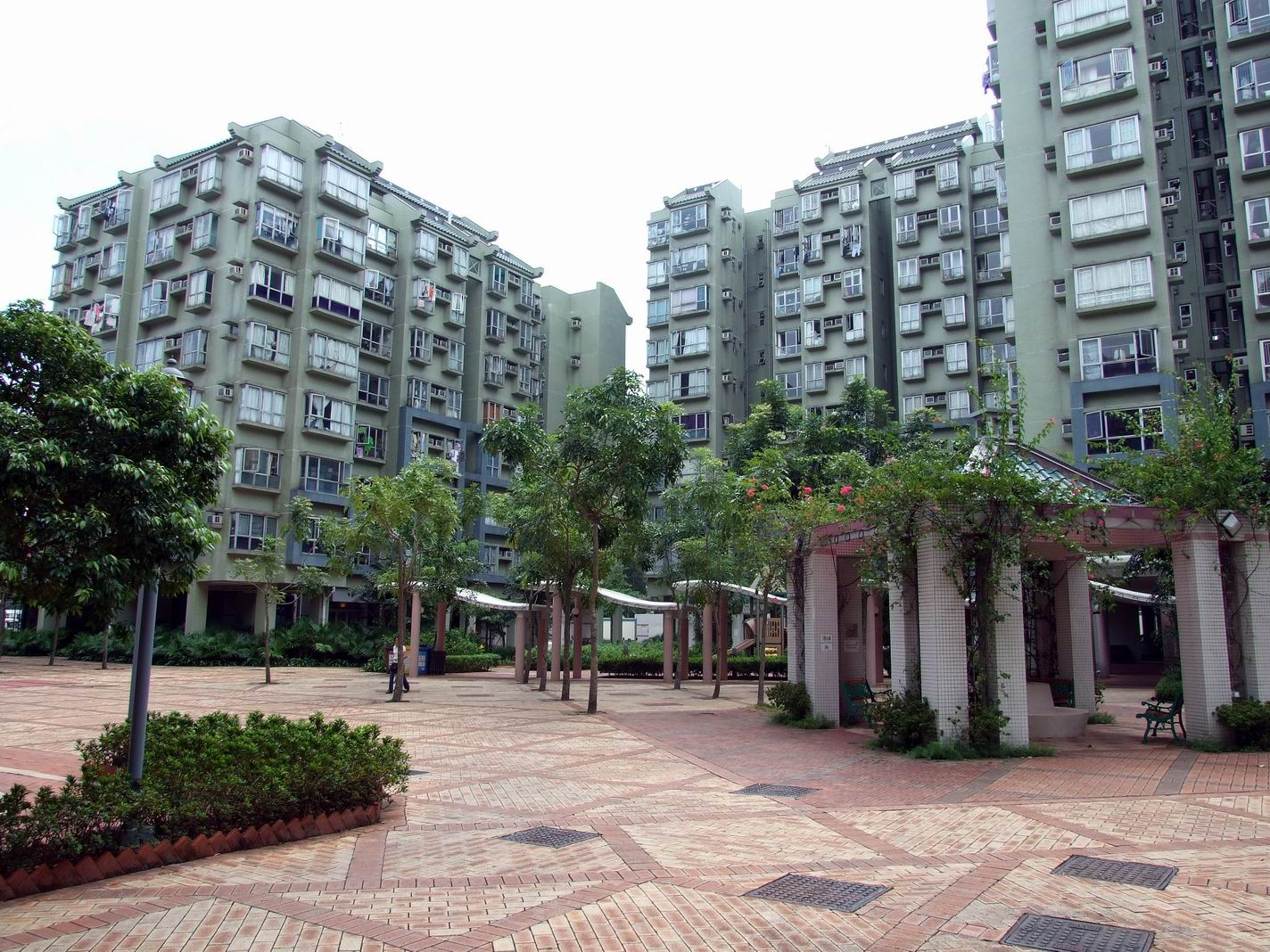
Lakeside Garden

Lakeside Garden (Chinese: 翠塘花園) is primarily a subsidised private housing estate and Flat-for-Sale Scheme estate on the reclaimed land. It is the third rural housing scheme developed by Hong Kong Housing Society. It consists of ten private residential blocks and one rental residential block, completed in 1997. The rental block provides affordable rental housing similar to those of the Hong Kong Housing Authority.

== Transport ==
Sai Kung Town is primarily served by double-decker buses, minibus and both green and red taxis. There is no MTR link to Sai Kung Town. Ferry services are available to the neighbouring islands and isolated coastal villages in Sai Kung Hoi.

Take a minibus to Sai Kung from Hang Hau MTR Station (minibus 101M), Mong Kok MTR Station (red minibus), or Choi Hung MTR Station (minibus 1A or bus 92).

== Press ==
Sai Kung is served by Sai Kung & Clearwater Bay Magazine, a freely-distributed, English-language monthly magazine, and the community website Saikung.com.

== Education ==
Sai Kung is in Primary One Admission (POA) School Net 95. Within the school net are multiple aided schools (operated independently but funded with government money) and one government school: Tseung Kwan O Government Primary School (將軍澳官立小學).

The Hong Kong Academy (Early Childhood, Primary & Secondary) is located in Sai Kung.

Sai Kung Sung Tsun Catholic School (Primary Section & Secondary Section) is also located in Sai Kung.

Hong Kong Public Libraries operates the Sai Kung Public Library in the Sai Kung Government Offices.

== See also ==
- Man Yee Wan New Village
- Sha Tsui New Village
- Dock 1A (Expected to happen in January 2025)
