= Conic Island =

Uninhabited island of Hong Kong

Native name: 飯甑洲
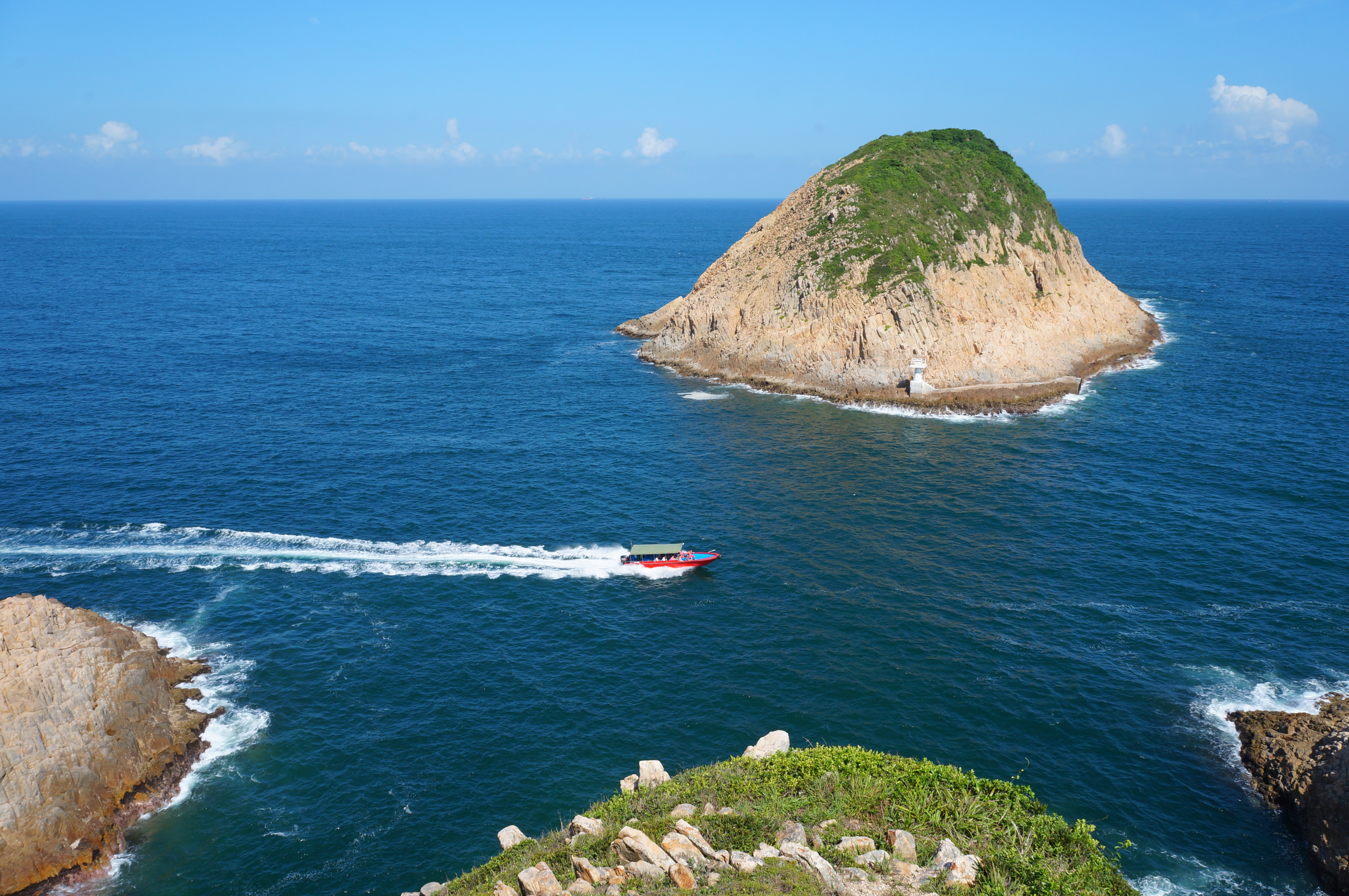
- Conic Island

- Location within Hong Kong

Geography
- Coordinates: 22°21′49.32″N 114°23′29.76″E
- Length: 300 m (1000 ft)
- Width: 100 m (300 ft)
- Coastline: 780 m (2560 ft)
- Highest elevation: 50 m (160 ft)

Administration
- Hong Kong
- District: Sai Kung

Demographics
- Population: 0

Conic Island or Fan Tsang Chau (Chinese: 飯甑洲) is a small uninhabited island in Sai Kung District, Hong Kong.

Its Chinese name derives from it being in the shape of "甑" (Wade–Giles: tseng; Jyutping: zang6; Cantonese Yale: jahng), a crockery used in ancient times in steaming rice.

There is a small lighthouse and a basic dock on the island.

== Location ==
Located within Sai Kung East Country Park, the island lies a few hundred metres east of Tsang Pang Kok (罾棚角), Long Ke Wan. It is visible from Tsang Pang Kok, the East Dam of the High Island Reservoir, the eastern end of Man Yee Road as well as at the end of Stage 1 of the MacLehose Trail.

== Conservation ==
Conic Island is part of the High Island Special Area (糧船灣特別地區), which covers 3.9 hectares and was designated in 2011. The area includes the two islands Po Pin Chau and Conic Island and no part of High Island proper. The geology of the area is characterised by volcanic rocks of the Cretaceous period.
