= Tai Tau Chau =

- Traditional Chinese: 大頭洲
- Simplified Chinese: 大头洲
- Literal meaning: Big Head Island
Transcriptions
Standard Mandarin
- Hanyu Pinyin: Dàtóu zhōu
Yue: Cantonese
- Yale Romanization: daaih tàuh jāu
- Jyutping: daai6 tau4 zau1

Tai Tau Chau may refer to two islands of Hong Kong:

- Tai Tau Chau (Southern District), geographically off the coast of the Shek O Peninsula, southern Hong Kong Island, the Southern District
- Tai Tau Chau (Sai Kung District), geographically off the coast of the Sai Kung Peninsula, the Sai Kung District
