= Lan Nai Wan =

Former village and bay of Hong Kong

Coordinates: 22.389905°N 114.336762°E

Lan Nai Wan (Chinese: 爛泥灣), or Man Yee Wan (萬宜灣), was a bay in Sai Kung Peninsula, Sai Kung, New Territories, Hong Kong. It is now part of the High Island Reservoir. There was once a village called Lan Nai Wan Village (爛泥灣村) or Man Yee Wan Village (萬宜灣村) on the bay.

In the 1970s, the Hong Kong government decided to construct a reservoir (High Island Reservoir) in the bay and ten of the surrounding villages, including Lan Nai Wan, Pak Tam Chung and Sha Tsui, were submerged by rising water or fell within the catchment area of the reservoir after construction. The villagers were then relocated to areas near Sai Kung Old Town and Sai Kung Public Pier.

== See also ==
- High Island Reservoir
- Man Yee Wan New Village
