= Dock 1A =

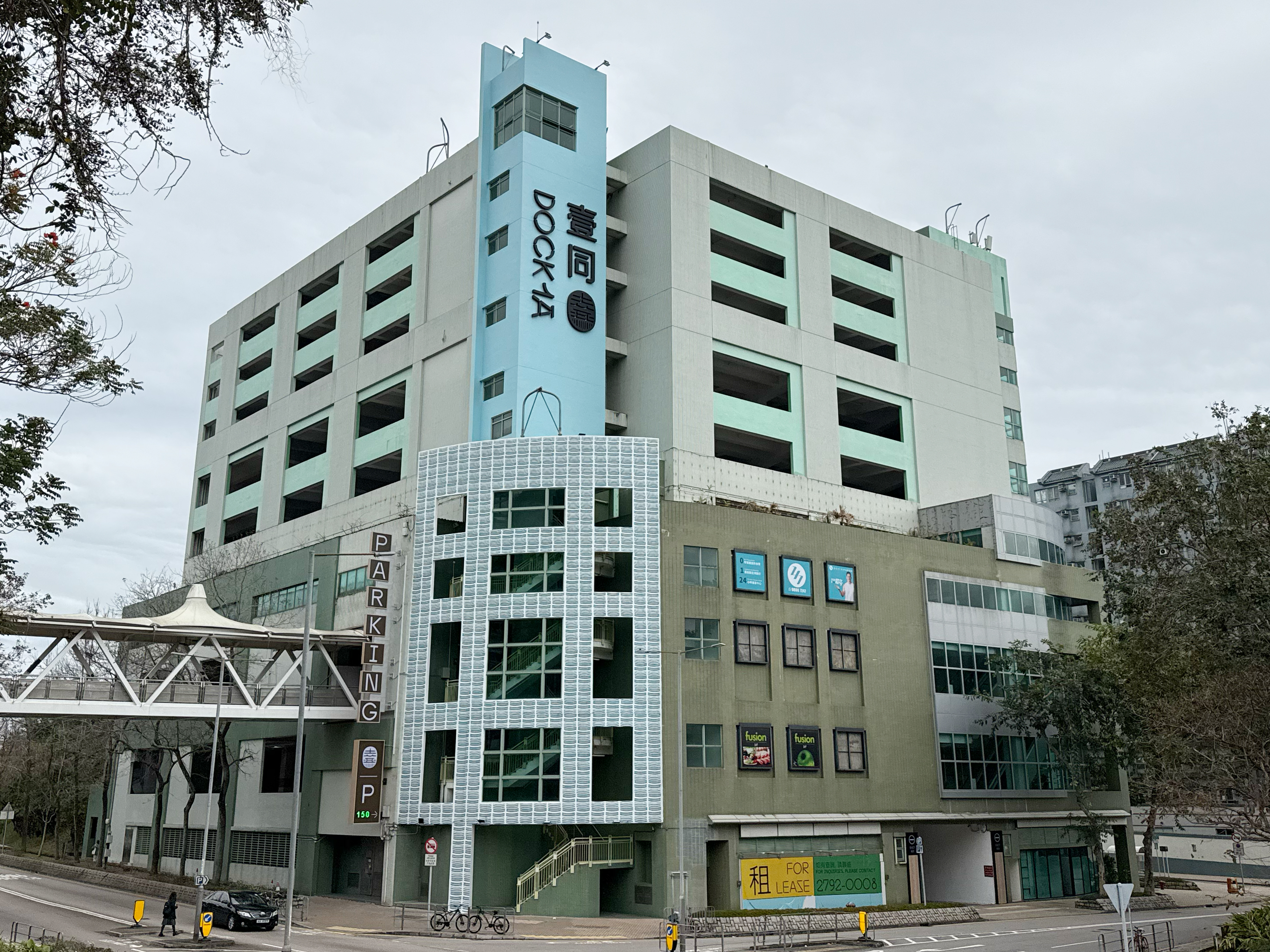
- Location: Sai Kung, Sai Kung District, New Territories, Hong Kong
- Address: 1A Chui Tong Road, Sai Kung
- Opened: January 2025
- Manager: Smart Glory Management Limited
- Floor area: 56,000 sq ft (5,200 m^{2})
- Floors: 10
- Parking: 387
- Website: Dock 1A

Dock 1A, formerly Centro, is a newly revitalised mall and car park establishment located at Sai Kung, Hong Kong. The venue is situated a short distance from the Sai Kung Town Centre and Public Piers. Previously home to Tikitiki Bowling Alley and a Fusion supermarket, it is being transformed into a 10-storey shopping centre and parking facility.

According the developers, Dock 1A is expected to feature shops, dining, and entertainment options. Dock 1A is connected to a footbridge spanning Hiram's Highway for convenience. It is, however, unclear how the new Hiram's Highway development plan shall affect it.

== History ==
=== Construction & Early History ===
Dock 1A was opened on 2002 on reclaimed land under its original name ‘Centro’. It soon was home to a branch of the supermarket chain Fusion, by ParknShop, operating on the third floor. In 2015 local real estate developer Brad Gotfried continued what the Sai Kung Buzz called ‘a desire to bring exotic South Pacific venues to Sai Kung’ in opening a colourful, Polynesian-themed bowling alley and bar called ‘TikiTiki’ opened on the building's fourth floor, alongside an associated furniture store on the ground floor. These two were closed prior to July 2024. On the 6th of January 2018, Urban Entertainment Ltd. opened the Crazy Cow Café, a café and bakery centred around bovines and staffed by former hotel chefs. At a similar time, the ‘Sci-Fi Café’ opened on the second floor.

=== Recent History ===
Centro was sold to Smart Glory Management Limited for roughly $500 million late 2022. Renovation works began mid 2023, seeking to give the interior a more sophisticated, inviting aesthetic. Exterior decoration work began later that year; new colours were painted and a scale pattern was stencilled to the front. Exterior decoration work was finished in early 2025. On 1st of January 2025, the gym franchise group ‘24/7 Fitness’ moved into the fourth floor, following a dispute which led to TikiTiki's eviction. Village vets moved into the ground floor plot around the same time.

== Features ==
- Site area: Over 34,000 sq. ft.
- Leasing area: Over 56,000 sq. ft.
- Parking: 380+ car and lorry parking spaces
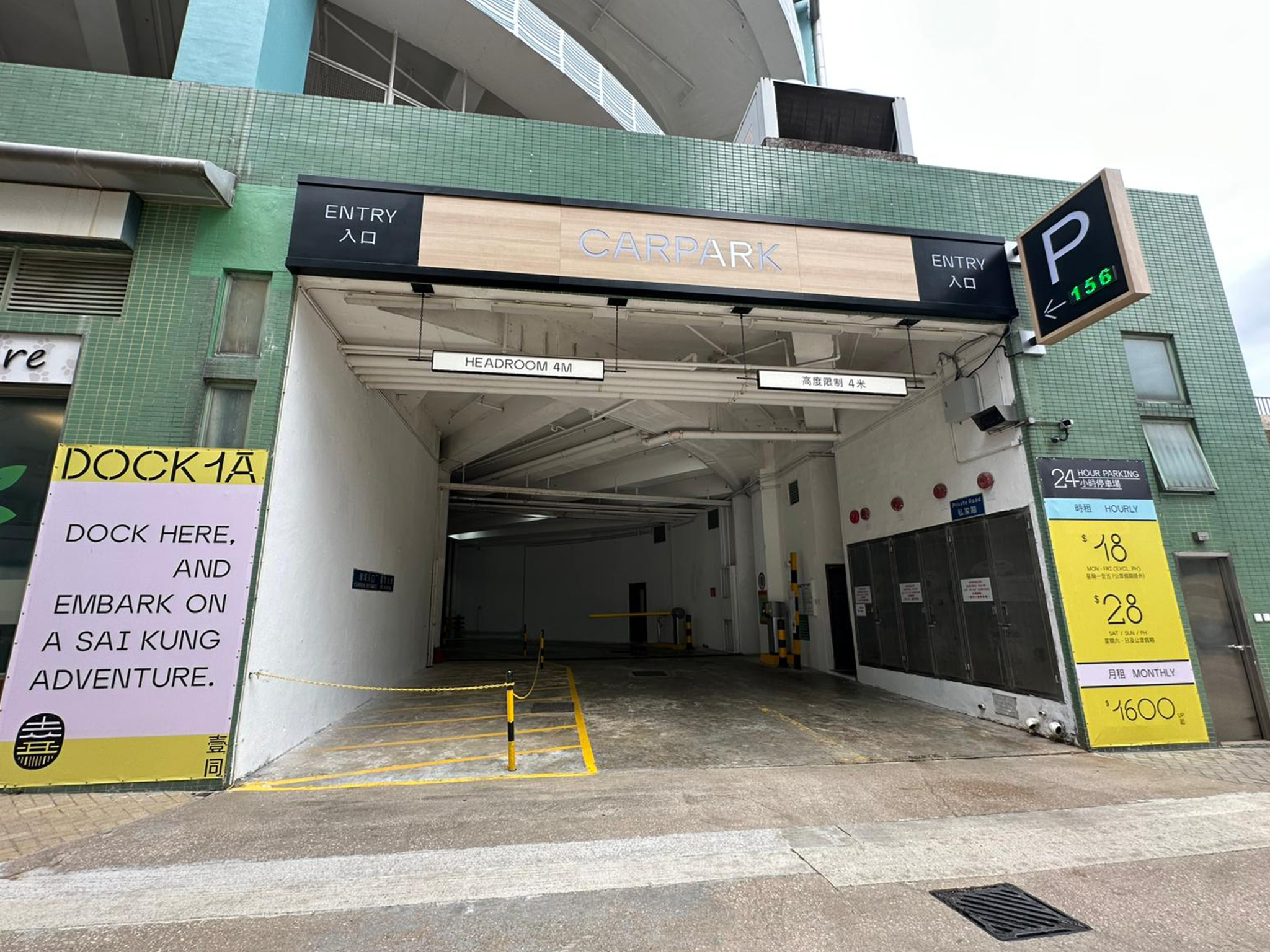
G/F Car Park Entry

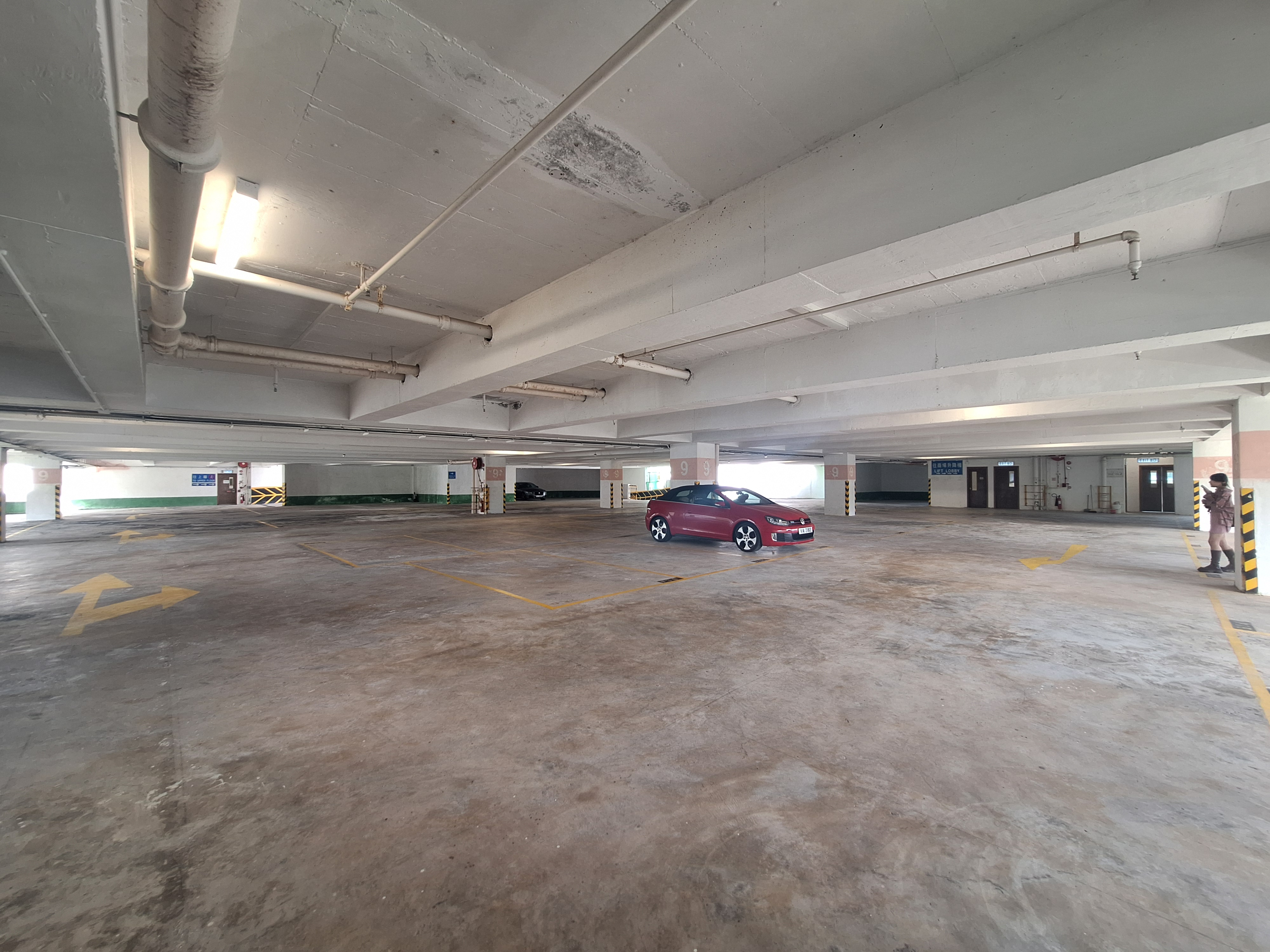
9/F Car Park

== Facilities ==
No. of floors: 10 (total)

- Ground Floor (G/F): Cafes†, shops† and Village Vets, Monthly Parking
- First Floor (1/F): Seasonal pop-up shops, Car & Lorry Parking
- Second Floor (2/F): Dorrington Theatre Academy, Private Corner Auto Car Dealer, Car & Lorry Parking
- Third Floor (3/F): Fusion Supermarket
- Fourth Floor (4/F): 24/7 Fitness Fitness Centre
- Fifth to Rooftop: Car & Lorry Parking

(† Not yet confirmed)

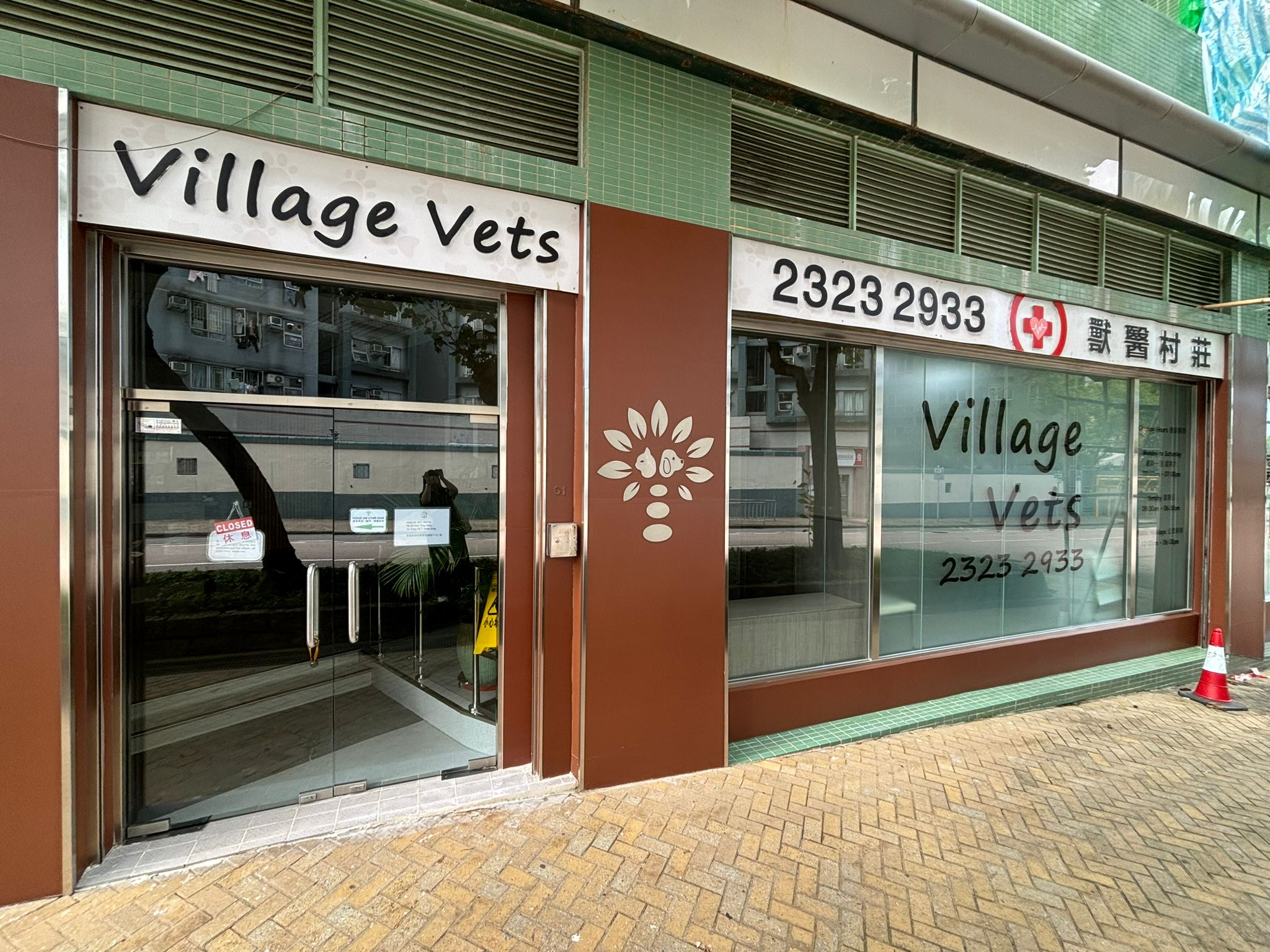
G/F Village Vets

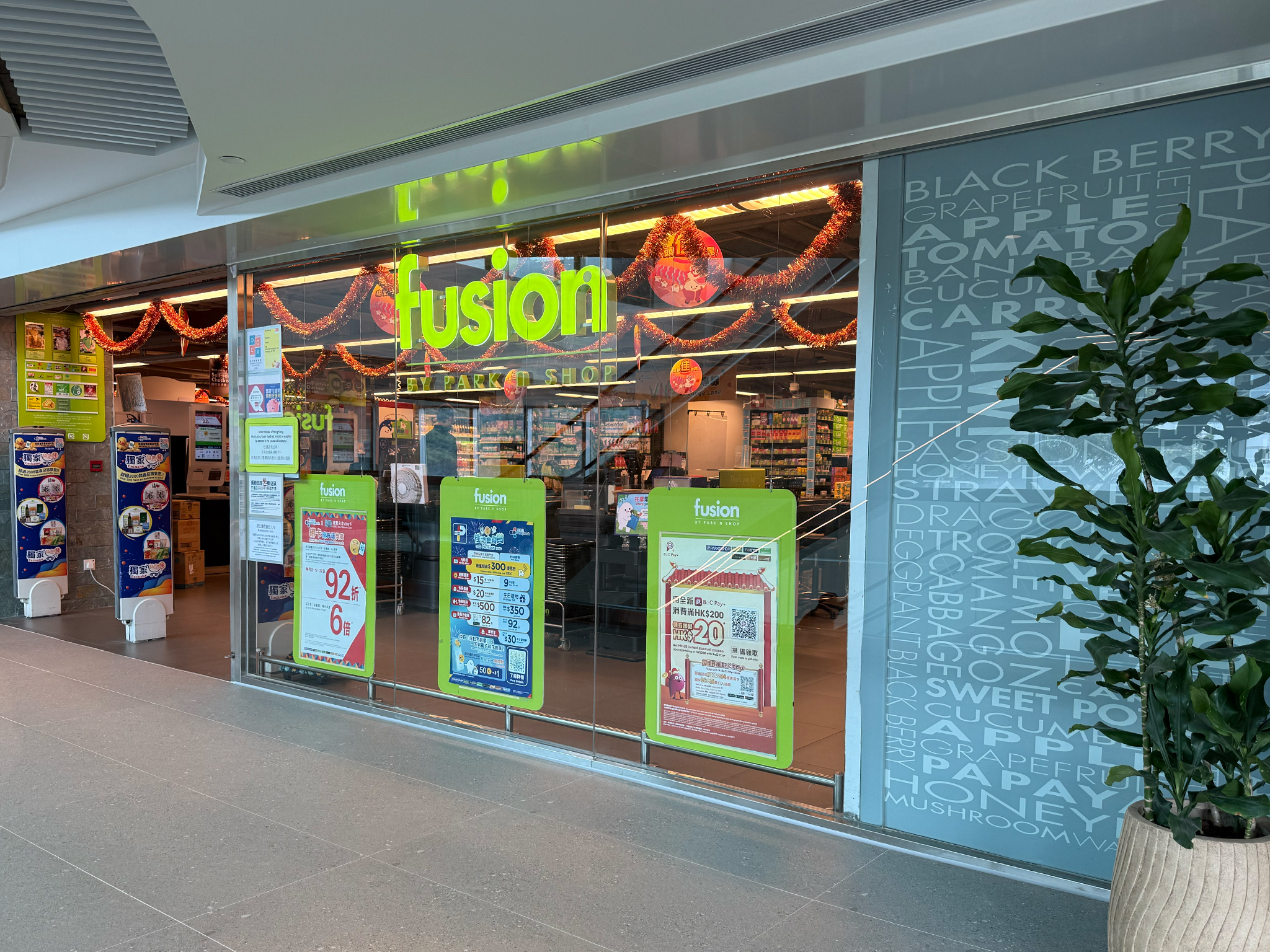
3/F Supermarket

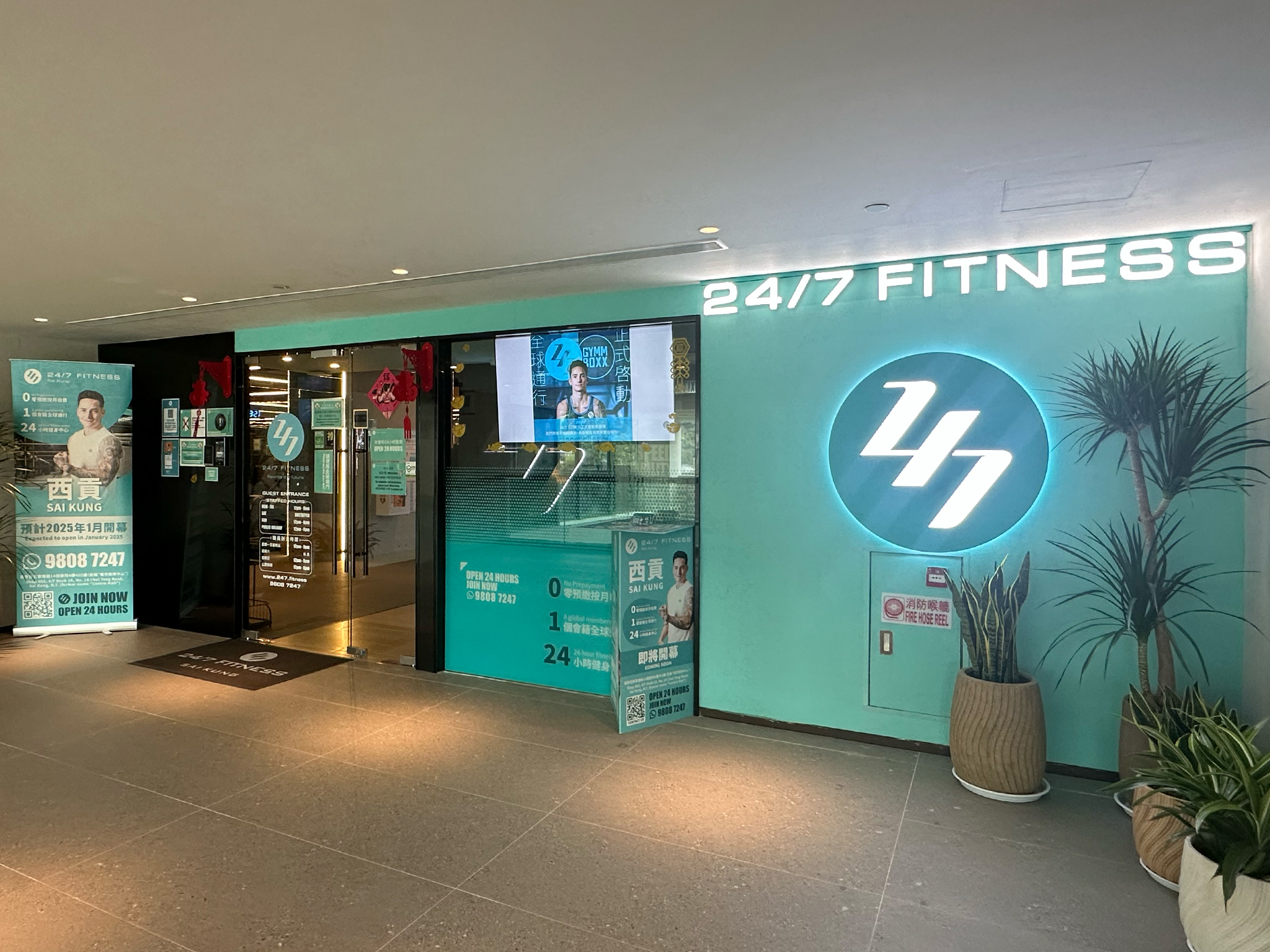
4/F Fitness

== Accessibility ==
- 5-minute walk from Sai Kung Town Centre
- 10-minute walk from Sai Kung Public Pier
- 30-minute drive (or 50-minute bus) from Ma On Shan Station
- 30-minute drive (or 2-hour MTR then bus) from Sha Tin Station
- 35-minute drive (or 50-minute MTR then bus) from Festival Walk
- 20-minute drive (or 40-minute bus) from Tseung Kwan O Station
