= Tai Tau Chau (Sai Kung District) =

Island in Sai Kung District, Hong Kong

Native name: 大頭洲 Nickname: Urn Island
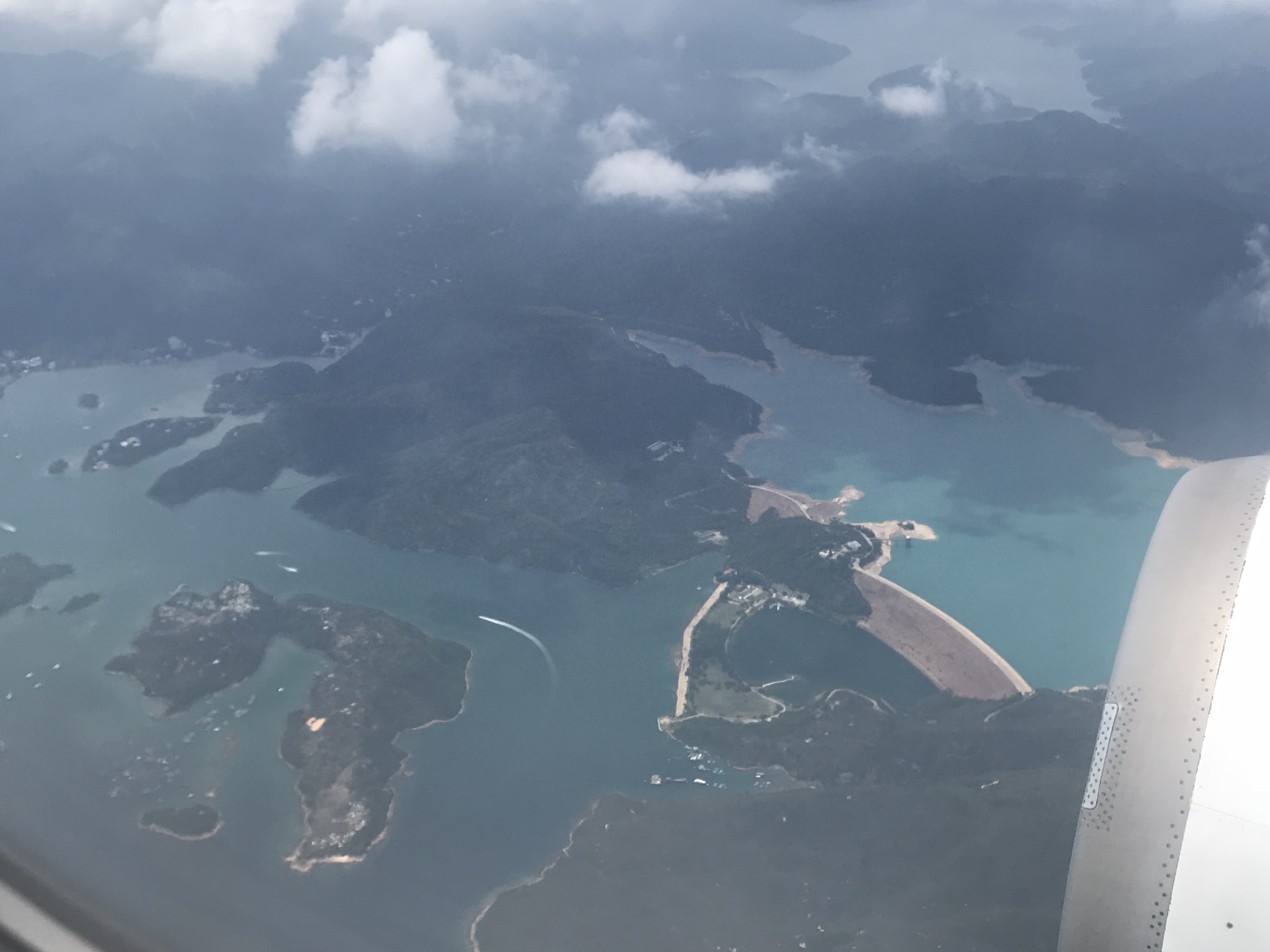
- Aerial view of Tai Tau Chau (bottom left) and the West Dam of High Island Reservoir (right)

- Location within Hong Kong

Geography
- Location: Sham Tuk Mun, Sai Kung District, Hong Kong
- Coordinates: 22°22′26.33″N 114°19′36.37″E
- Area: 0.48 km^{2} (0.19 sq mi)
- Highest elevation: 58 m (190 ft)

Administration
- China
- SAR: Hong Kong
- Region: New Territories
- District: Sai Kung District

Additional information

Chinese name
- Traditional Chinese: 大頭洲
- Simplified Chinese: 大头洲
- Literal meaning: Big Head Island
Transcriptions
Standard Mandarin
- Hanyu Pinyin: Dàtóu zhōu
Yue: Cantonese
- Yale Romanization: daaih tàuh jāu
- Jyutping: daai6 tau4 zau1

Tai Tau Chau also known for its less popular name Urn Island, is an island in the water body Sham Tuk Mun (深篤門), Sai Kung District, Hong Kong. Inner Port Shelter and Rocky Harbour are near the island.

== History ==
The name Urn Island was mentioned in Asiatic Pilot by the U.S. Hydrographic Office in 1910. The book described that vessels can enter Rocky Harbour from Port Shelter by passing through water passage near islets Urn Island (Tai Tau Chau) and Yim Tin Tsai. The book recommends to use sea chart as a guide, as the channel is narrow.

Since the 1980s, some part of the island became an approval burial site for fishermen.

== Biodiversity ==
62 species of vascular plant were discovered on the island.

== Economy ==
Several floating fish farms were located in the waters next to the island, known as Tai Tau Chau Fish Culture Zone. In 1982, councillors of the Sai Kung District Board, had requested to expand the area of the Fish Culture Zone, in order to accommodate fishermen from nearby Lap Sap Chau. In 1989, a refugee camp for Vietnamese was proposed to establish on High Island, a former island that near to the Fish Culture Zone. Councillors and fishermen worried that sea water of the Fish Culture Zone would be polluted by the increasing human population.

In the past, the fish rafts were used for commercial fish farming. Brown-dotted grouper and red grouper were the dominant species to culture in the Tai Tau Chau Fish Culture Zone.

However, in recent years some of them were converted to use by the tourists for recreational fishing. Red tides were also observed, affecting the Fish Culture Zone.

In 2019, a teen tourist was drowned in a fish farm of the island.

== Permitted Burial Ground ==
The island hosts Permitted Burial Grounds (PBGs), land used for graves. In 2021, the government took action against illegal burials on the island.
