= Man Yee Wan New Village =

Village in Sai Kung District, Hong Kong

Coordinates: 22.381434°N 114.271501°E

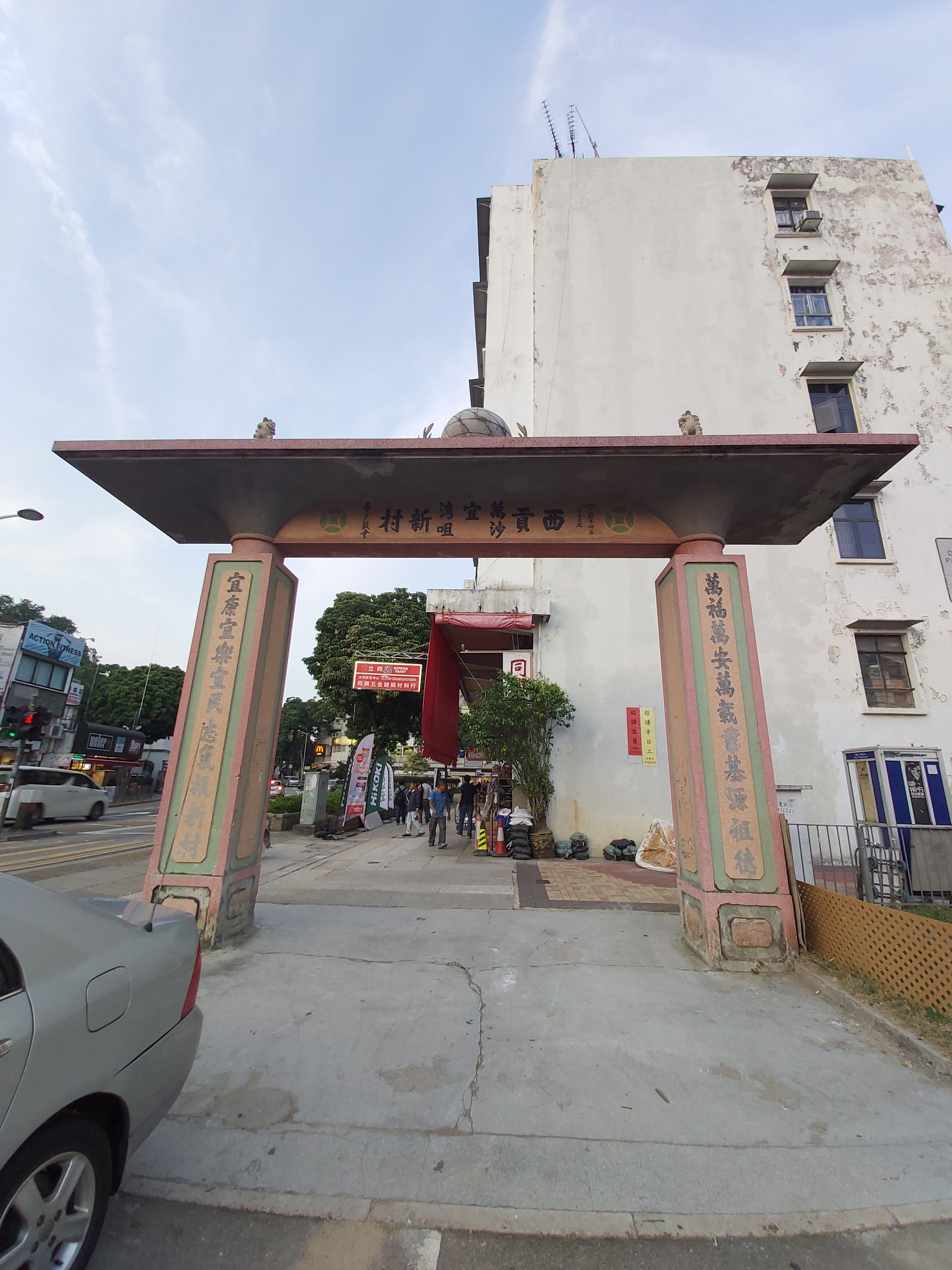
Man Yee Wan Sha Tsui San Tsuen memorial archway along Po Tung Road in Sai Kung Town, on the grounds of Man Yee Wan New Village.

Man Yee Wan New Village (Chinese: 萬宜灣新村) is a resettlement village in Sai Kung Town, Sai Kung District, Hong Kong.

== History ==
Several villages were submerged as a consequence of the building of the High Island Reservoir in the 1970s. These included Lan Nai Wan Village (爛泥灣村) and Sha Tsui Village. In 1975, 57 households from Lan Nai Wan Village, Sha Tsui Village, together with several households returning from overseas moved into Sai Kung Town, where the government had built 10 five-storey buildings on reclaimed land to accommodate them. The relocated village was called Man Yee Wan.

== Streets ==
The streets of Man Yee Wan New Village are Man Nin Street (萬年街), Yi Chun Street (宜春街), Wan King Path (灣景街) and Sha Tsui Path (沙咀街).

== See also ==
- Sha Tsui New Village
