= Po Pin Chau =

Island in Hong Kong

Coordinates: 22°21′30″N 114°22′43″E

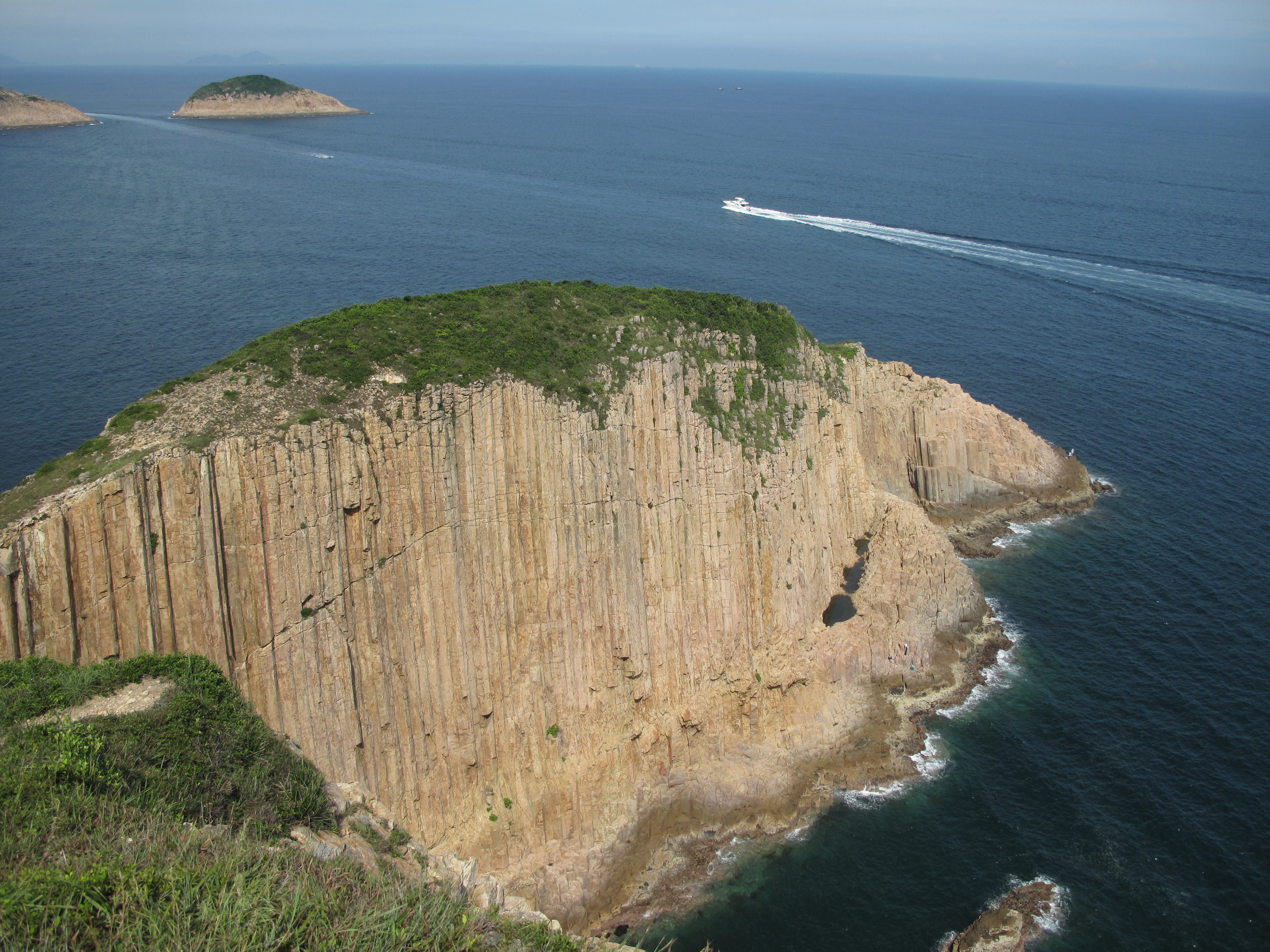
Po Pin Chau as seen from High Island. Conic Island is visible in the background

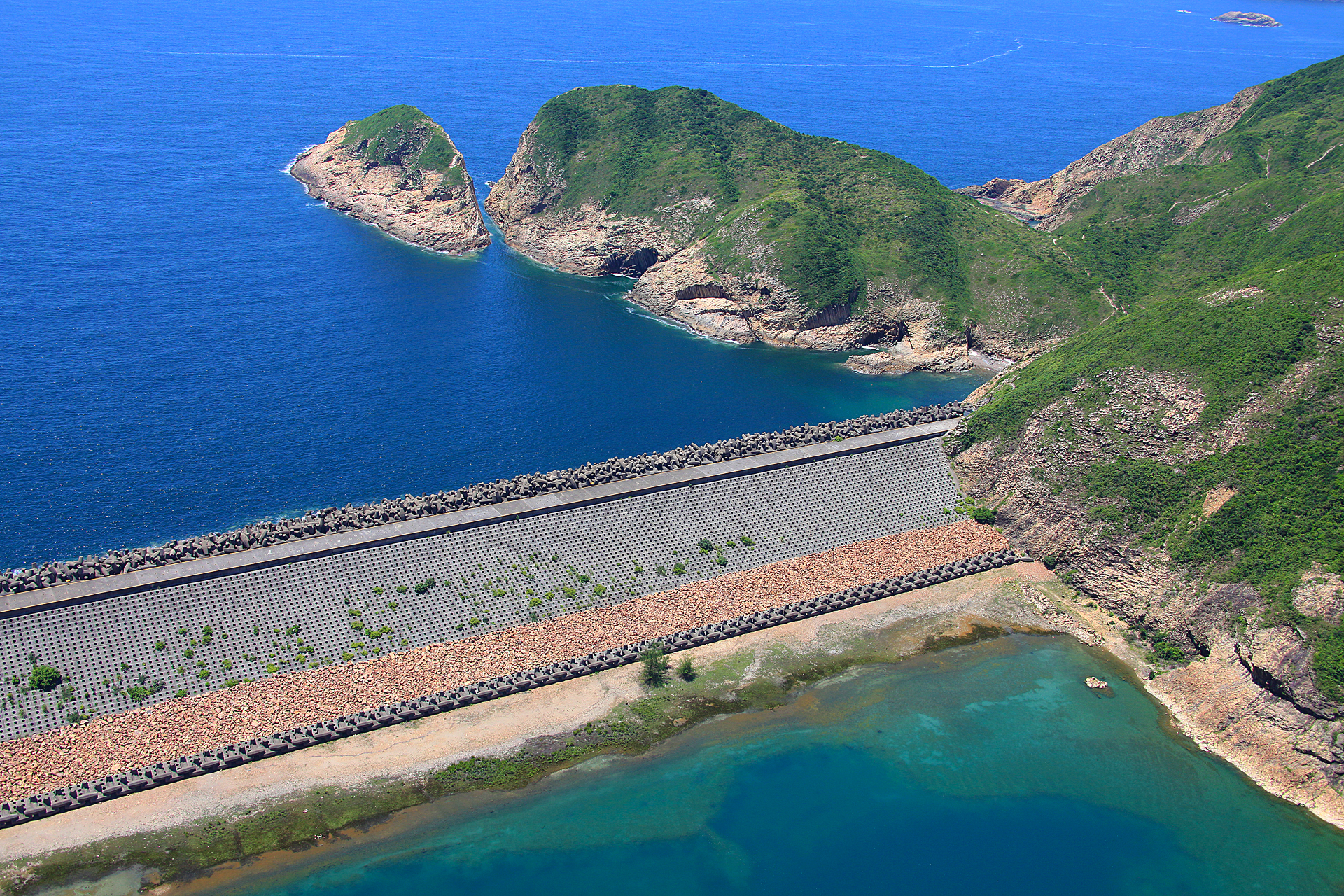
Po Pin Chau and the High Island Reservoir East Dam.

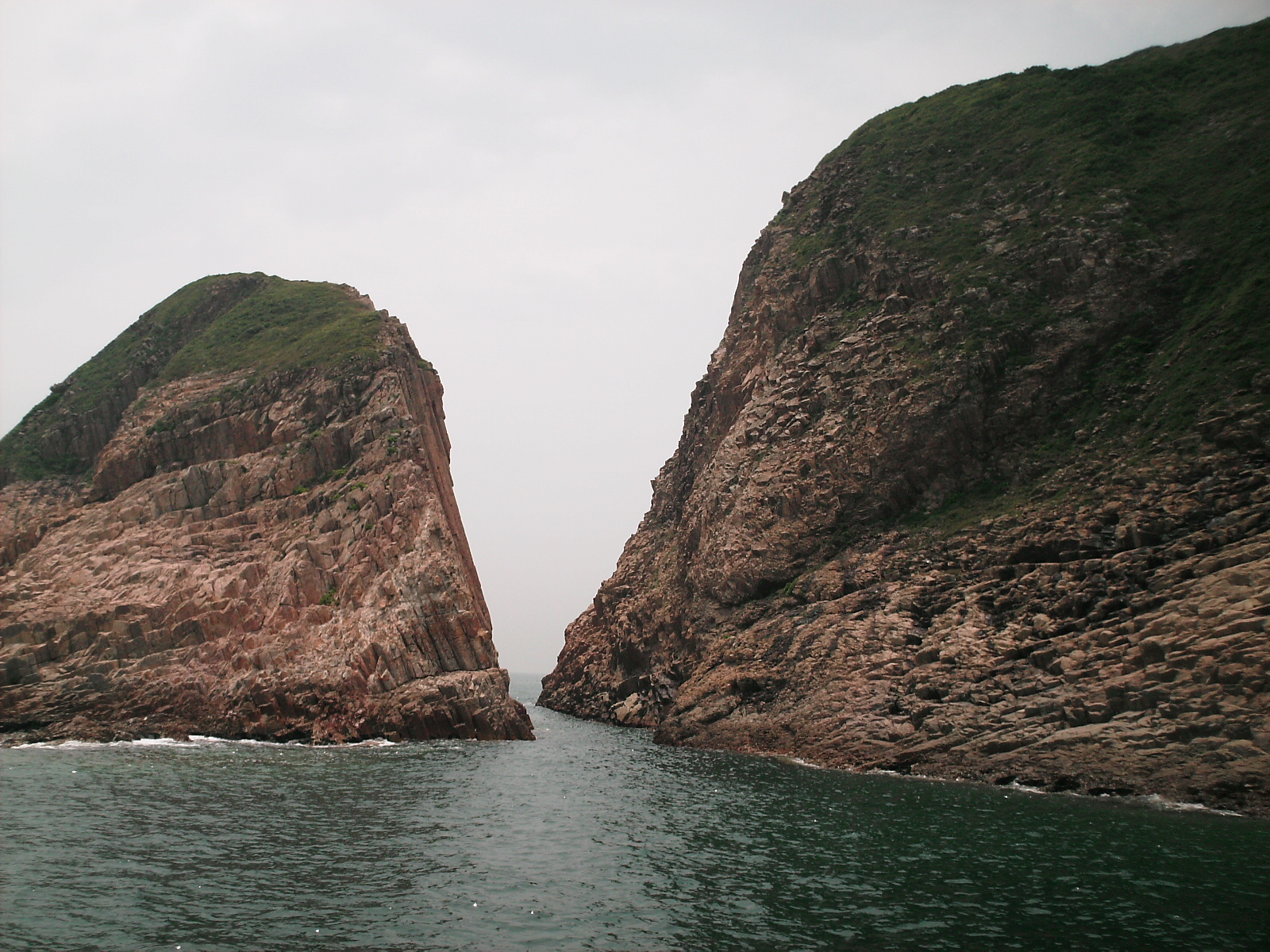
Po Pin Chau (left) and High Island (right)

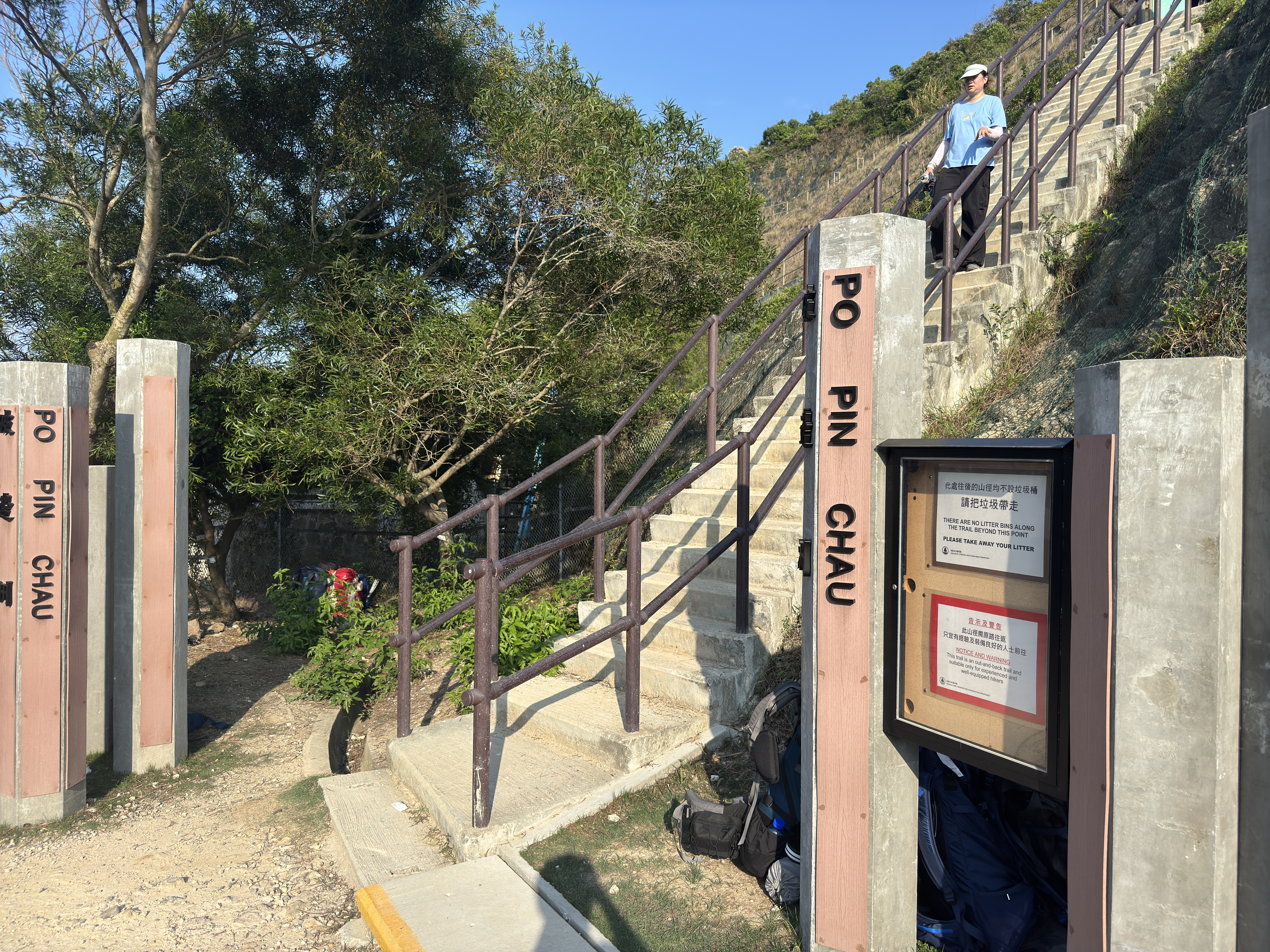
Access to Po Pin Chau Viewing Platform along Sai Kung Man Yee Road

Po Pin Chau (Chinese: 破邊洲) is an island in Hong Kong. Off the eastern coast of the East Dam of the High Island Reservoir, the island is known for its hexagonal columnar jointing. The island was originally a cape connected to the mainland, but eventually broke away from the mainland due to years of erosion. The island is administered by the Sai Kung District.

== Geology ==
The columnar rock formations on the island were formed after a series of volcanic eruptions in Hong Kong during the Jurassic period.

== Conservation ==
Po Pin Chau is part of the Hong Kong UNESCO Global Geopark and Sai Kung East Country Park.

Po Pin Chau is part of the High Island Special Area (糧船灣特別地區), which covers 3.9 hectares and was designated in 2011. The area includes the two islands Po Pin Chau and Conic Island and no part of High Island proper. The geology of the area is characterised by volcanic rocks of the Cretaceous period.

== See also ==
- List of islands and peninsulas of Hong Kong
- List of sea stacks
