= Sha Tsui New Village =

Coordinates: 22.380634°N 114.272878°E

Sha Tsui New Village (Chinese: 沙咀新村) is a village in Sai Kung District, Hong Kong.

== See also ==
- Man Yee Wan New Village
