= High Island (Hong Kong) =

Former island in the southeast of Sai Kung Peninsula in Hong Kong

Coordinates: 22°21′30″N 114°21′17″E

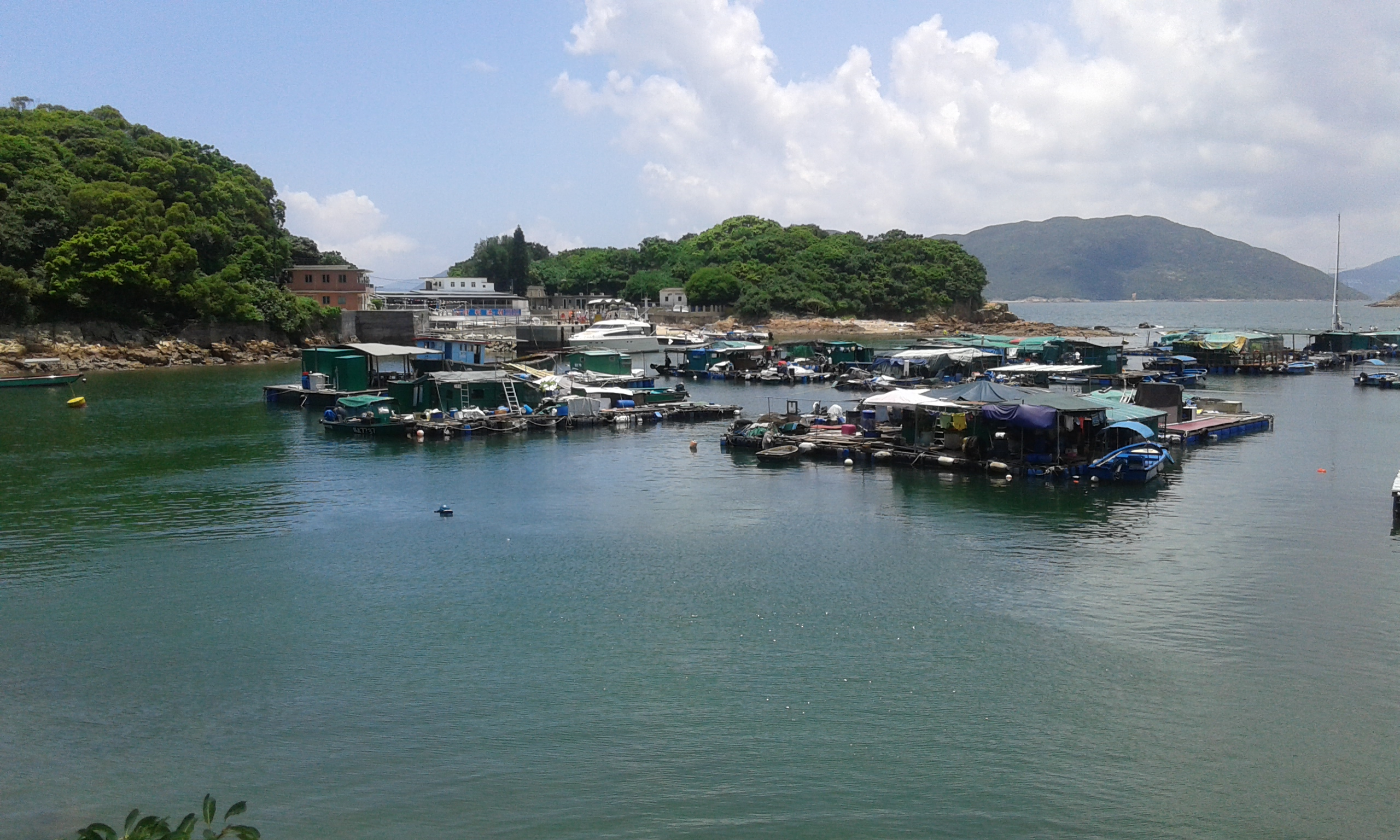
Fish farming next to Sha Kiu Tau (沙橋頭), on High Island, Hong Kong.

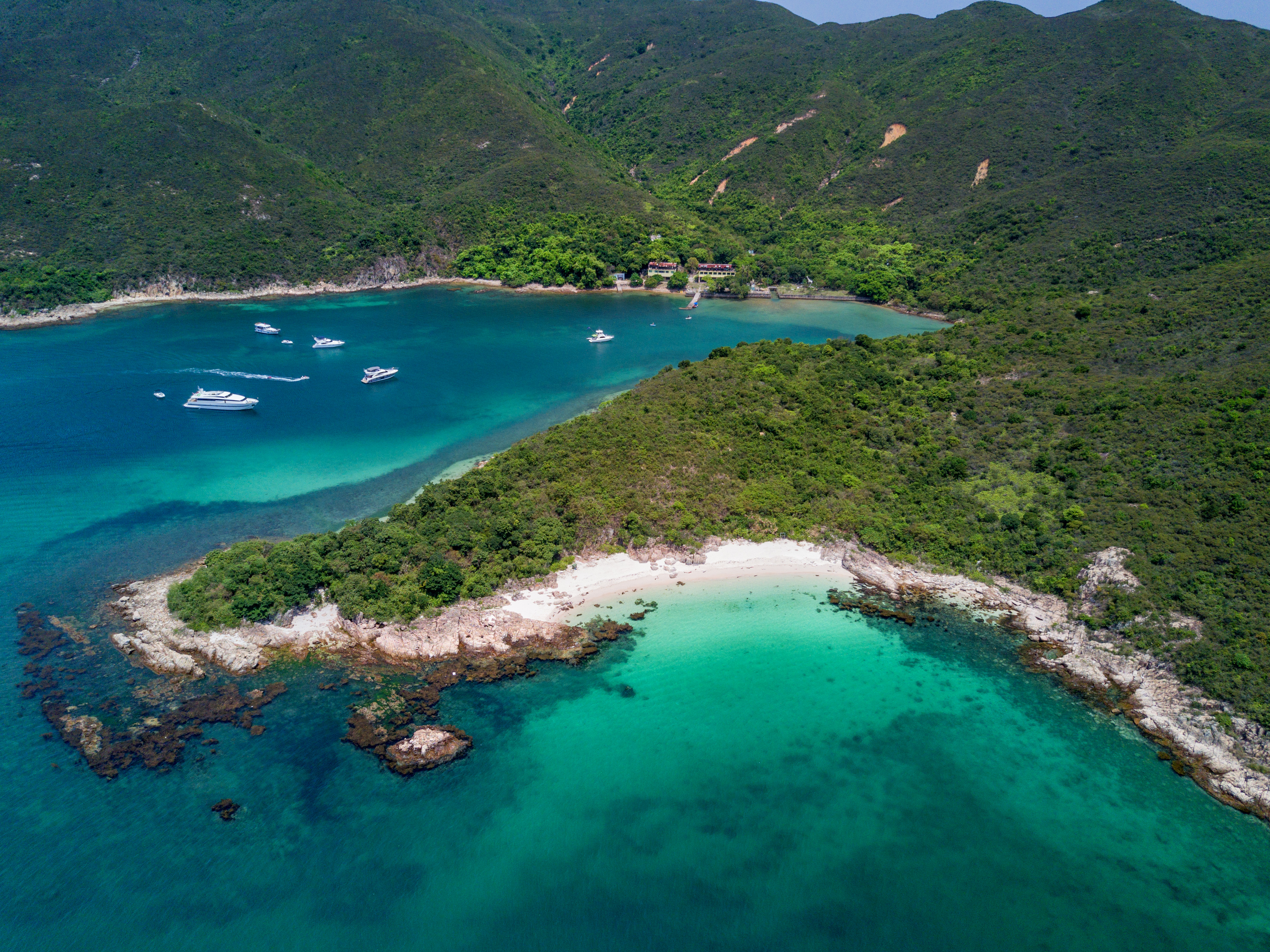
Tai She Wan (大蛇灣), on the western coast of High Island.

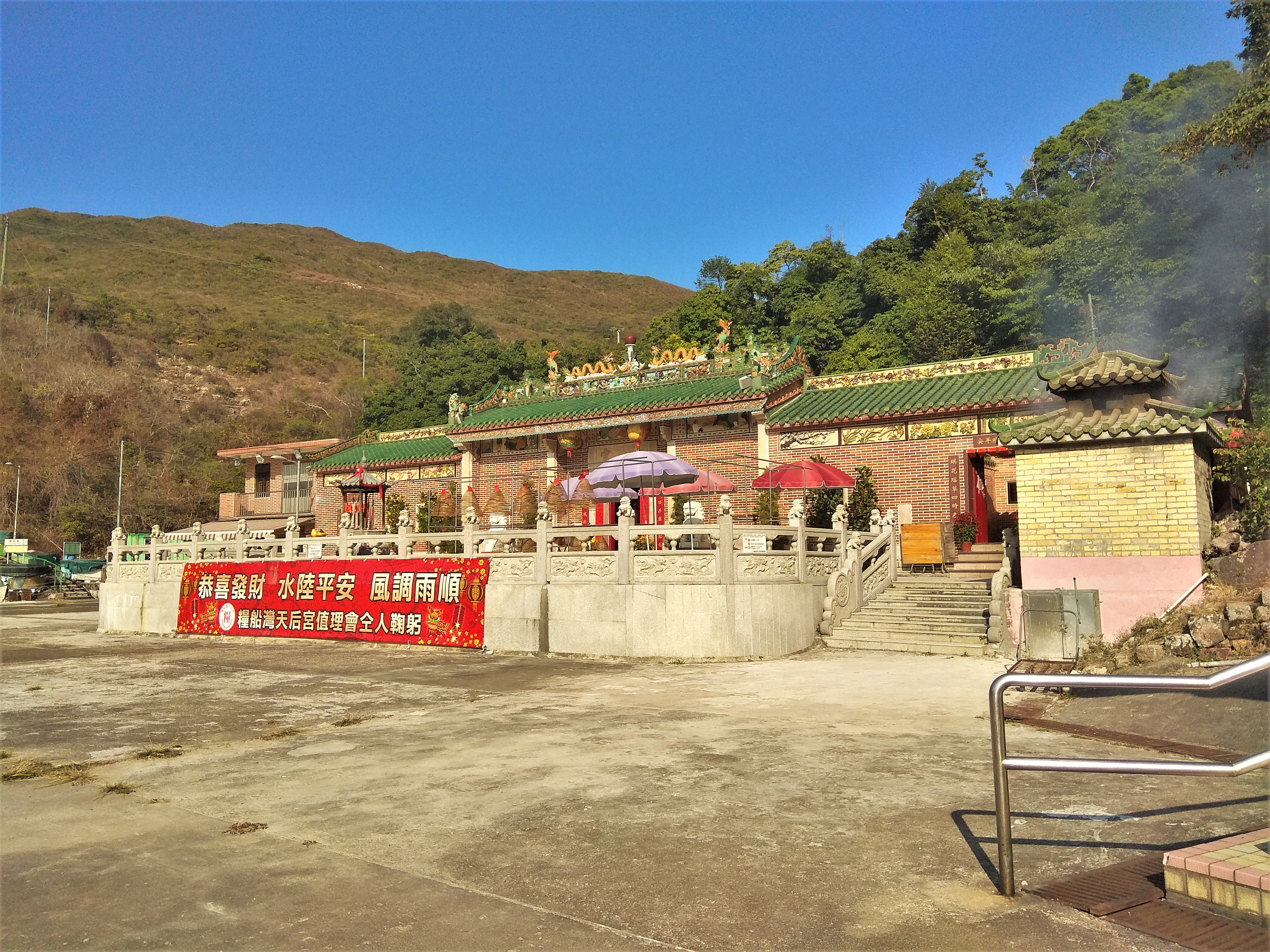
Tin Hau Temple on High Island.

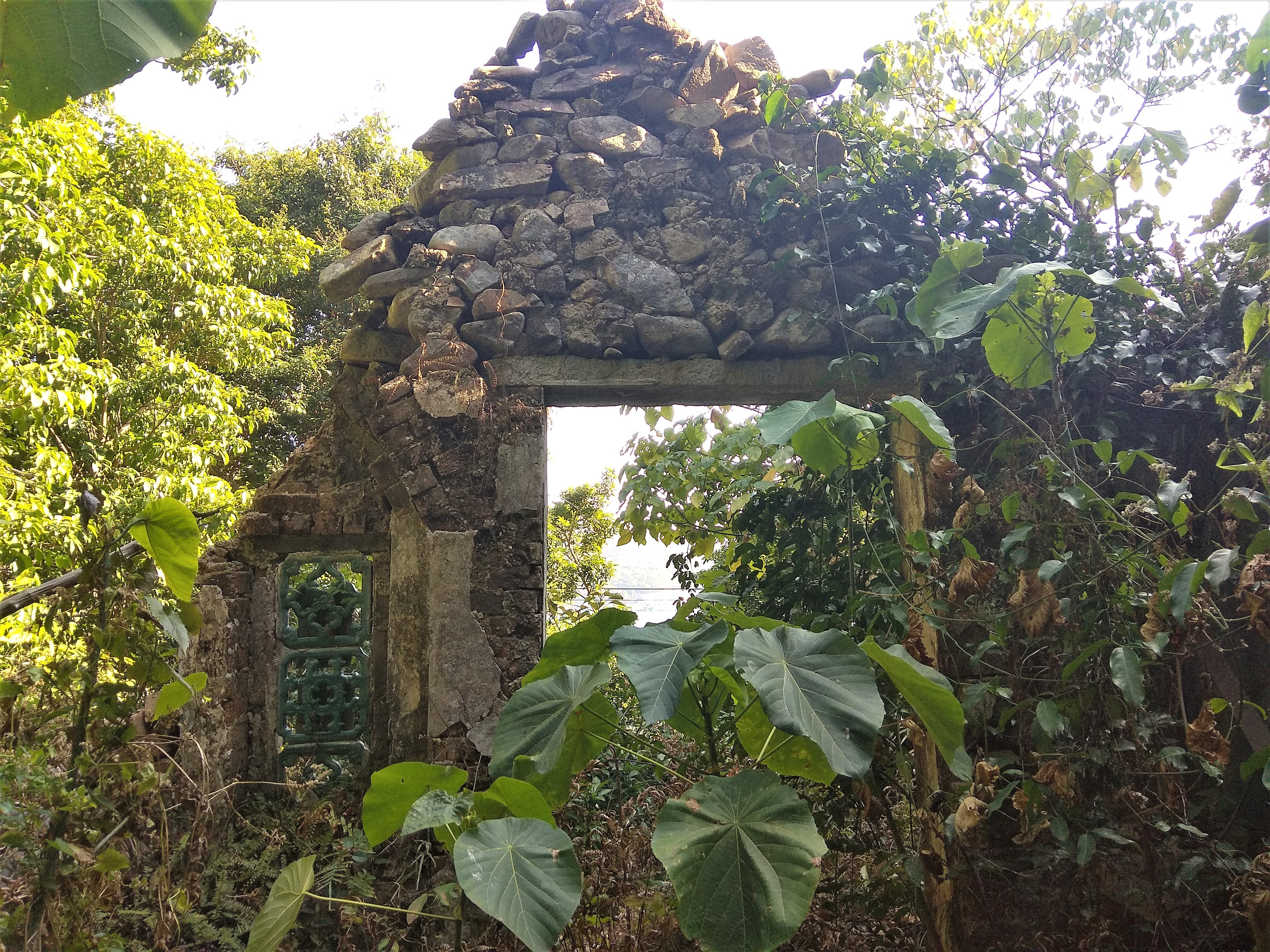
Ruins of Lung Shun Wan Mission Centre (龍船灣天主堂) in Pak A.

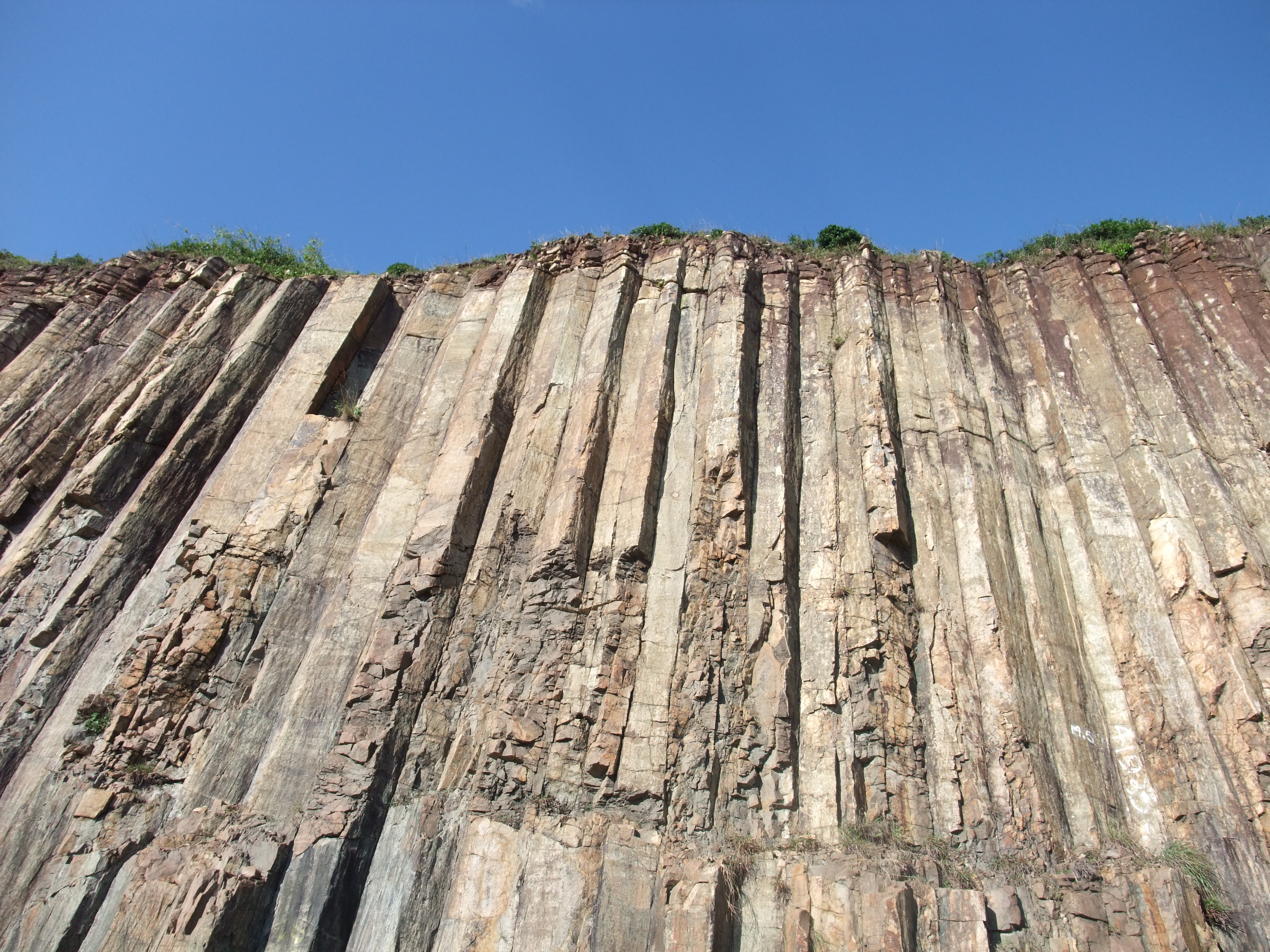
Volcanic tuffs with hexagonal columnar jointing at East Dam of High Island Reservoir.

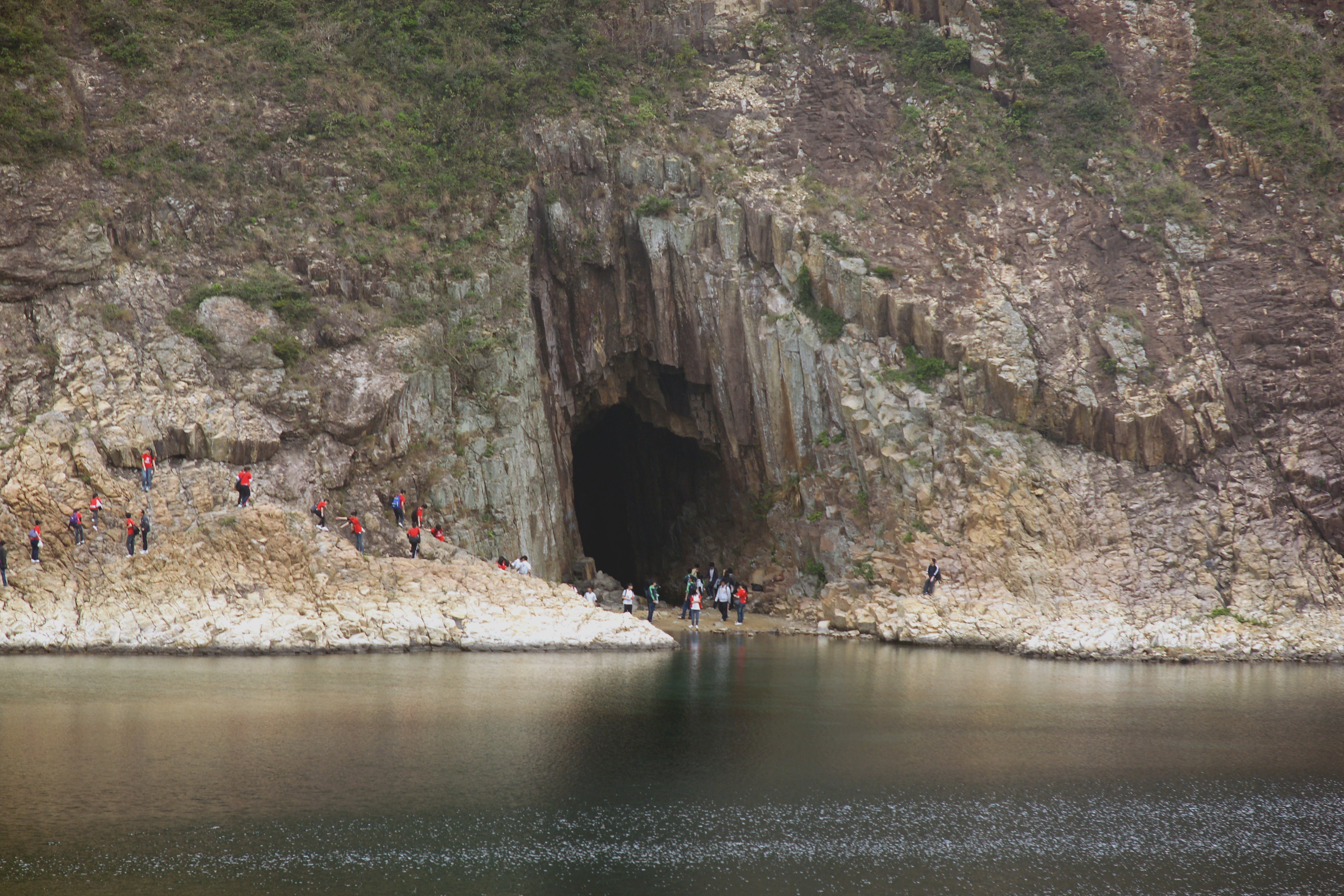
Sea cave on High Island, next to the High Island Reservoir East Dam.

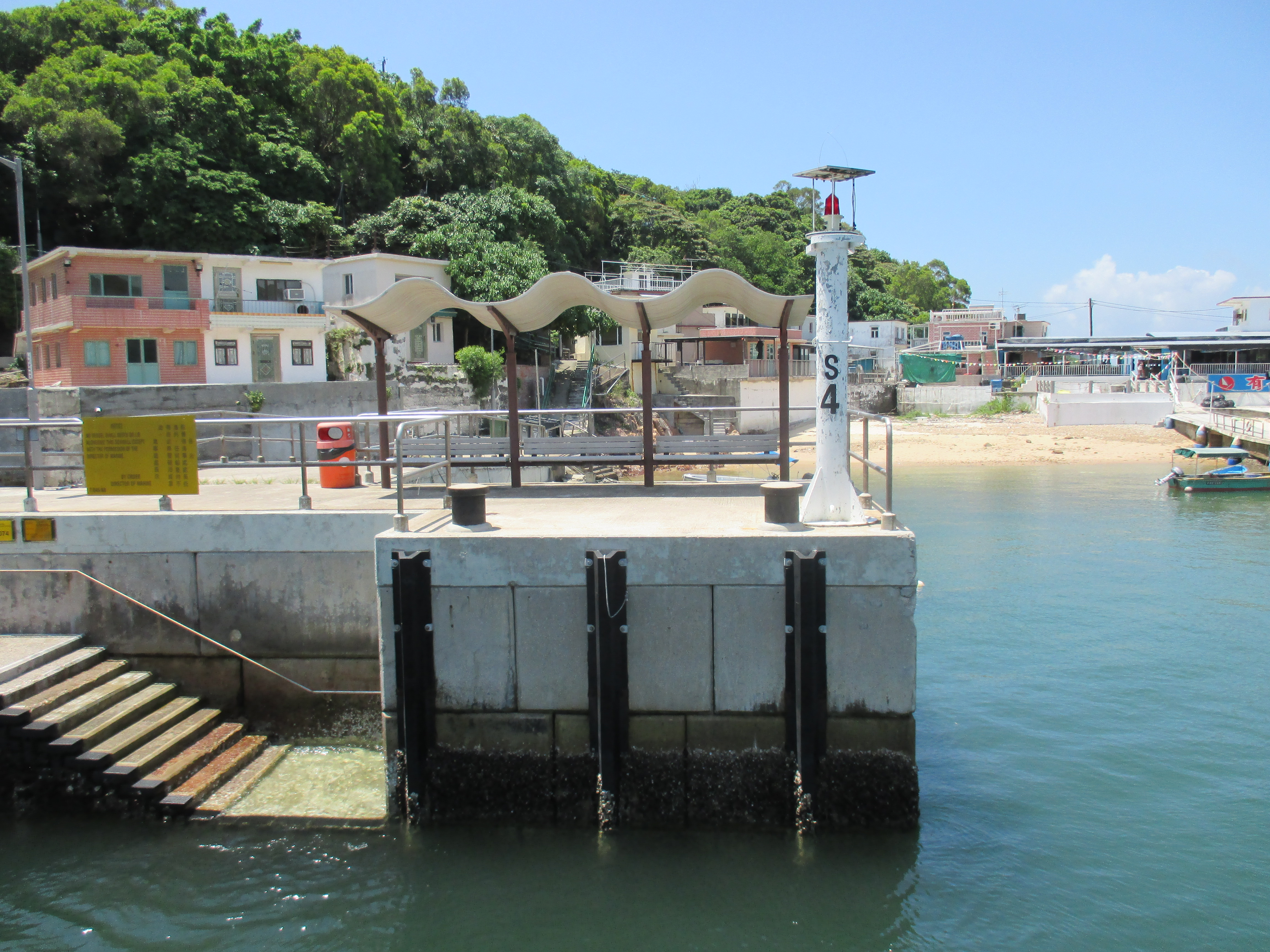
Sha Kiu Public Pier.

High Island or Leung Shuen Wan Chau (糧船灣洲, Cantonese Yale: lèuhng syùhn wāan hói) is a former island located in the southeast of Sai Kung Peninsula in Hong Kong, within Sai Kung District. Two sets of dams constructed between 1969 and 1979 and crossing the former Kwun Mun Channel (官門海峽), connect the island to the peninsula, thereby forming the High Island Reservoir. Before being connected to the mainland, the island had an area of 8.511 km² (3.29 square miles) and was the 4th largest island of Hong Kong in 1960.

== Etymology ==
Geologically, high islands are islands of volcanic origin. The term can be used to distinguish such islands from low islands, which are formed from sedimentation or the uplifting of coral reefs (which have often formed on sunken volcanos).

== Geography ==
High Island is located in the southeast of Sai Kung Peninsula, east of Port Shelter, Kau Sai Chau, Jin Island, Tai Tau Chau, and Bay Islet, north of Town Island, Bluff Island, Basalt Island, Wang Chau, Wong Nai Chau, and Kong Tau Pai, as well as west of Po Pin Chau and Conic Island.

The body of water to the southwest of the former island is called Rocky Harbour (or Leung Shuen Wan Hoi (糧船灣海; 'grain ship bay sea')).

== Villages ==
Villages and former villages on High Island include, from west to east along the south coast: Tai She Wan (大蛇灣), Pak A (北丫; 'North Fork'), Sha Kiu (沙橋), Tung A (東丫) and Pak Lap (白腊; 'White Insect Wax').

Pak A, Tung A, Pak Lap and Tai She Wan are recognised villages under the New Territories Small House Policy.

Pak Lap was historically is a single (Lau) surname Hakka village. It contains 17 houses built in two rows. These houses have been restored and developed into a small resort.

=== Population ===
At the time of the 1911 census, the population of Pak A was 164. The number of males was 76.

In 2006, a few dozen people lived in Pak A, Tung A, Sha Kiu and Pak Lap. Additionally, about 100 people lived in designated fish culture zones.

== Geology ==
High Island features columnar-jointed volcanic tuff. Most of the columns are sub-vertical, straight-sided and parallel. This type of volcanic rock covers a large area around Sai Kung Peninsula in the eastern part of Hong Kong, including High Island Reservoir and Tai Long Wan.

== Features ==
=== Aquaculture ===
The water body near Leung Shuen Wan is one of the 26 designated marine fish culture zones in Hong Kong and its shores feature several seafood restaurants.

=== Tin Hau Temple ===
There is a Tin Hau Temple (糧船灣天后宮) on High Island, located between Pak A and Tung A. Built in 1741, it is one of the two temples which have a marine parade to celebrate the Tin Hau Festival (天后誕). The other is the Tin Hau Temple in Tap Mun which has it once every ten years. The Tin Hau Festival at High Island takes place every two years. The religious ceremony lasts six days and the marine parade is held on the eve of Tin Hau's birthday. Other deities including Kwan Tai and Kwun Yam are also worshipped at the temple. The temple was listed as a Grade II historic building in 1996, and as a Grade III historic building since 2010.

=== Refugee camp ===
The High Island Detention Centre was a refugee camp built near West Dam of the reservoir for hosting refugees and boat people from Vietnam. The area is now a flat piece of grassland that is grazed by cows. It has a pavilion that leads out of the strip of land.

== Education ==
Leung Shuen Wan is in Primary One Admission (POA) School Net 95. Within the school net are multiple aided schools (operated independently but funded with government money) and one government school: Tseung Kwan O Government Primary School (將軍澳官立小學).

== Conservation ==
High Island is part of the Sai Kung East Country Park. The eastern part of High Island is part of the Sai Kung Volcanic Rock Region of the Hong Kong Geopark.

The High Island Special Area (糧船灣特別地區) covers 3.9 hectares and was designated in 2011. It includes the two islands Po Pin Chau and Conic Island and no part of High Island proper. The geology of the area is characterised by volcanic rocks of the Cretaceous period.

== Transport ==
There are public piers in Pak A, Tung A and Sha Kiu, but there is no public ferry service to High Island. Sai Kung Man Yee Road (西貢萬宜路) runs through the northern part of High Island, roughly along High Island Reservoir, from West Dam to East Dam. The 9A minibus route is the only public transportation that can reach the East Dam of the High Island Reservoir, meanwhile urban taxis and new territories taxis are also allowed in Sai Kung Man Yee Road.

== See also ==
- Historic churches of Sai Kung
- Hong Kong National Geopark
