= High Island Reservoir =

Reservoir in New Territories, Hong Kong

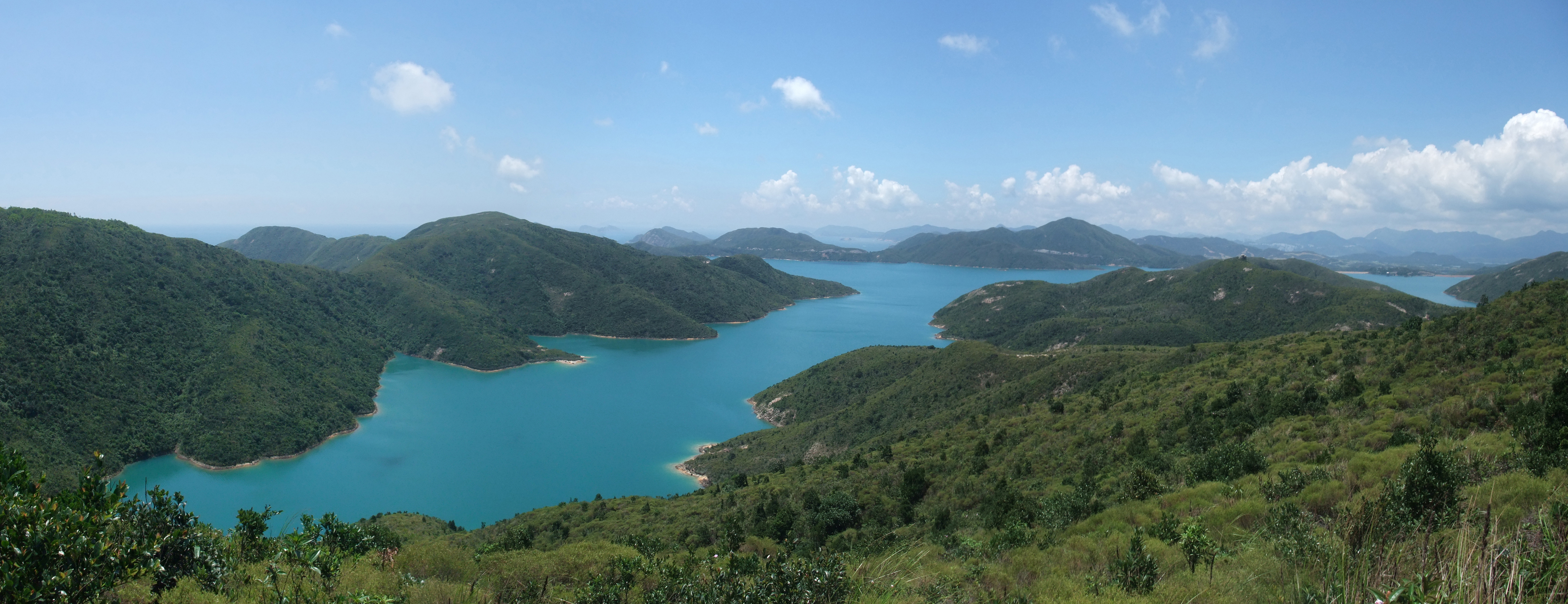
- High Island Reservoir, near Tuk Ngu Shan and Kam Kui Shek Teng

- Location within Hong Kong
- Location: Sai Kung Peninsula, New Territories, Hong Kong
- Coordinates: 22°22′31″N 114°21′4″E
- Type: Reservoir

High Island Reservoir
- Traditional Chinese: 萬宜水庫
Transcriptions
Standard Mandarin
- Hanyu Pinyin: Wànyí shuǐkù
Yue: Cantonese
- Yale Romanization: Maahn yìh séui fu
- Jyutping: Maan6 ji4 seoi2 fu3

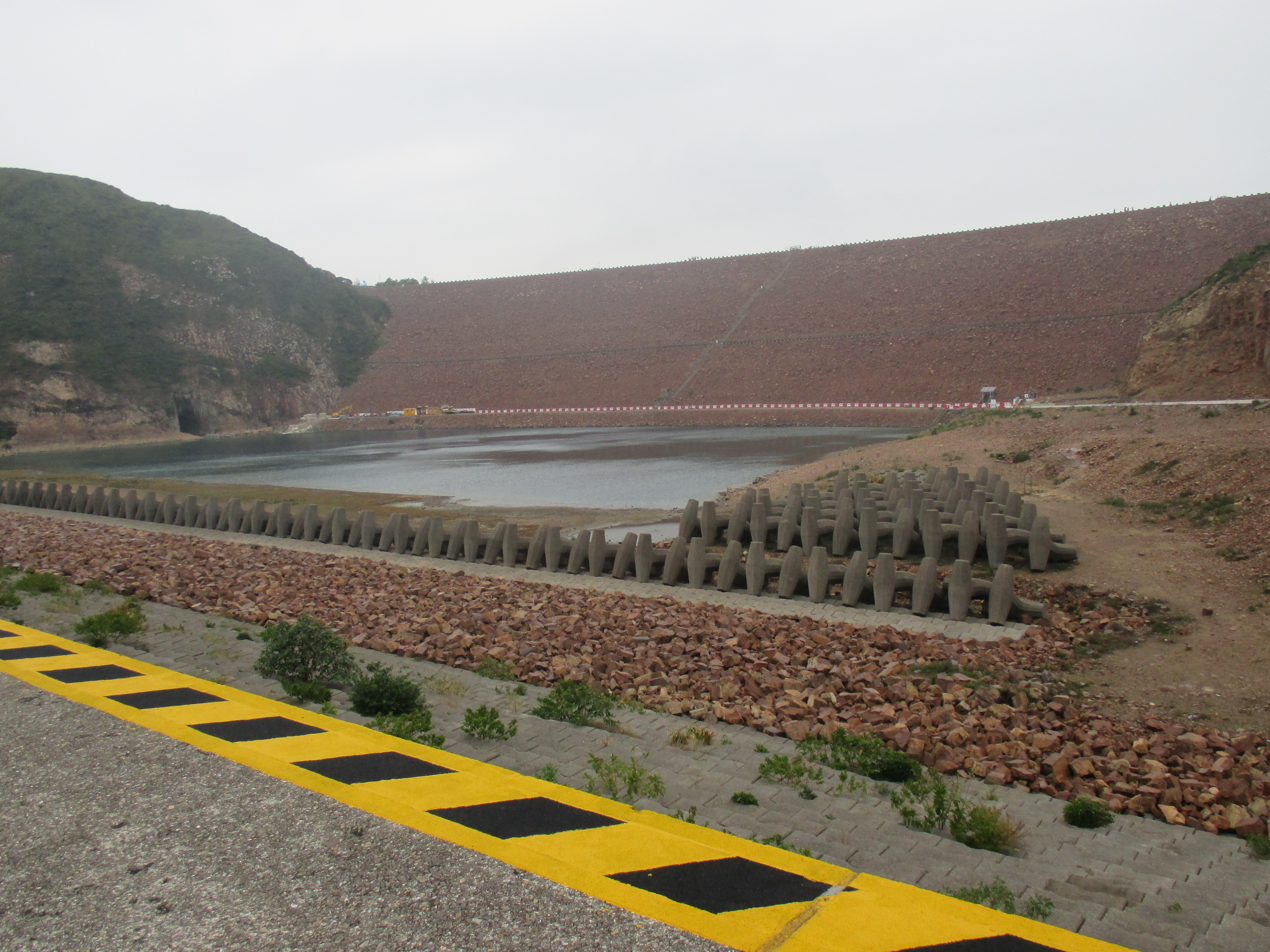
High Island Reservoir East Dam.

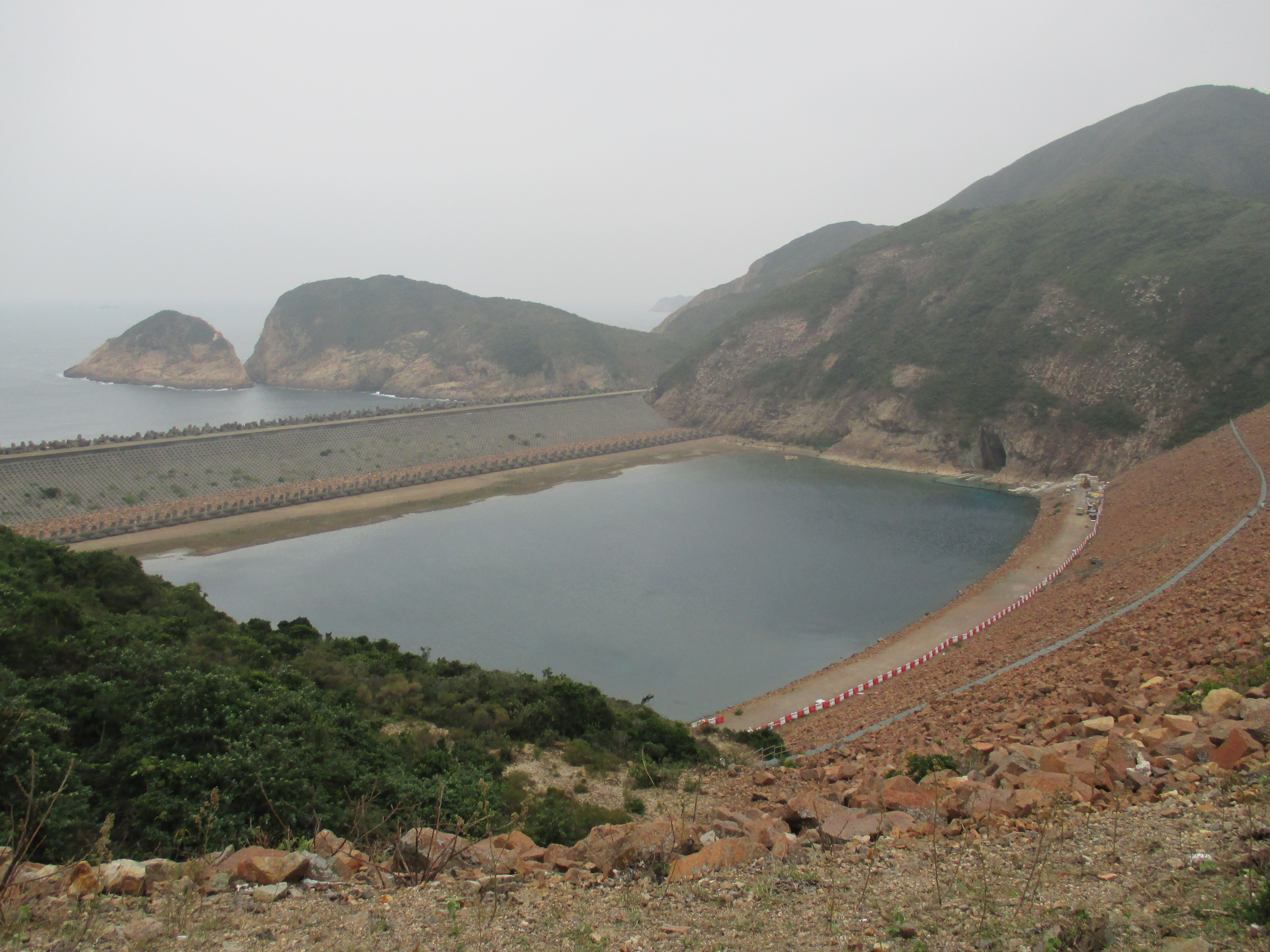
View from the top of High Island Reservoir East Dam. Po Pin Chau is the rocky islet on the left.

The High Island Reservoir is the largest impounding reservoir by capacity in Hong Kong. Located in the far south eastern part of the Sai Kung Peninsula, it was opened in 1978, helping to alleviate water shortage problems in Hong Kong. Its water capacity is approximately 281 million cubic metres. The area it occupies was originally the Kwun Mun Channel (官門海峽), which separated High Island from the Sai Kung Peninsula.

== History ==
Its history starts as a result of the water shutdown by mainland China during the 1967 Hong Kong riots. The government responded with the High Island Reservoir. It was expected to be the same size as Plover Cove Reservoir. The construction, contracted by an Italian company, cost more than HK$400 million.

There is a memorial next to the East Dam dedicated to five workers who lost their lives during the project's construction.

== Design ==
The reservoir was designed by Binnie & Partners as part of the High Island Water Scheme which included pipeworks and other supporting infrastructure as well as the reservoir itself. The reservoir was created by constructing two main dams. One was built at the west of High Island connecting it with the Sai Kung Peninsula at Yuen Ng Fan (元五墳). The other was built in the southeast of High Island, connecting it with the Sai Kung Peninsula near Po Pin Chau, a stack island. Three smaller dams were also constructed in valleys around the reservoir. Aqueducts totalling 5 miles in length were also constructed to transfer water from streams around Sai Kung Peninsula to the reservoir. Construction spanned 10 years from 1969 to 1979. Two roads were built as part of the scheme, crossing over the dams. This enabled visitors to access a very remote and unspoiled area for recreation. Many of the techniques and technology used, like grouting, was cutting edge at the time.

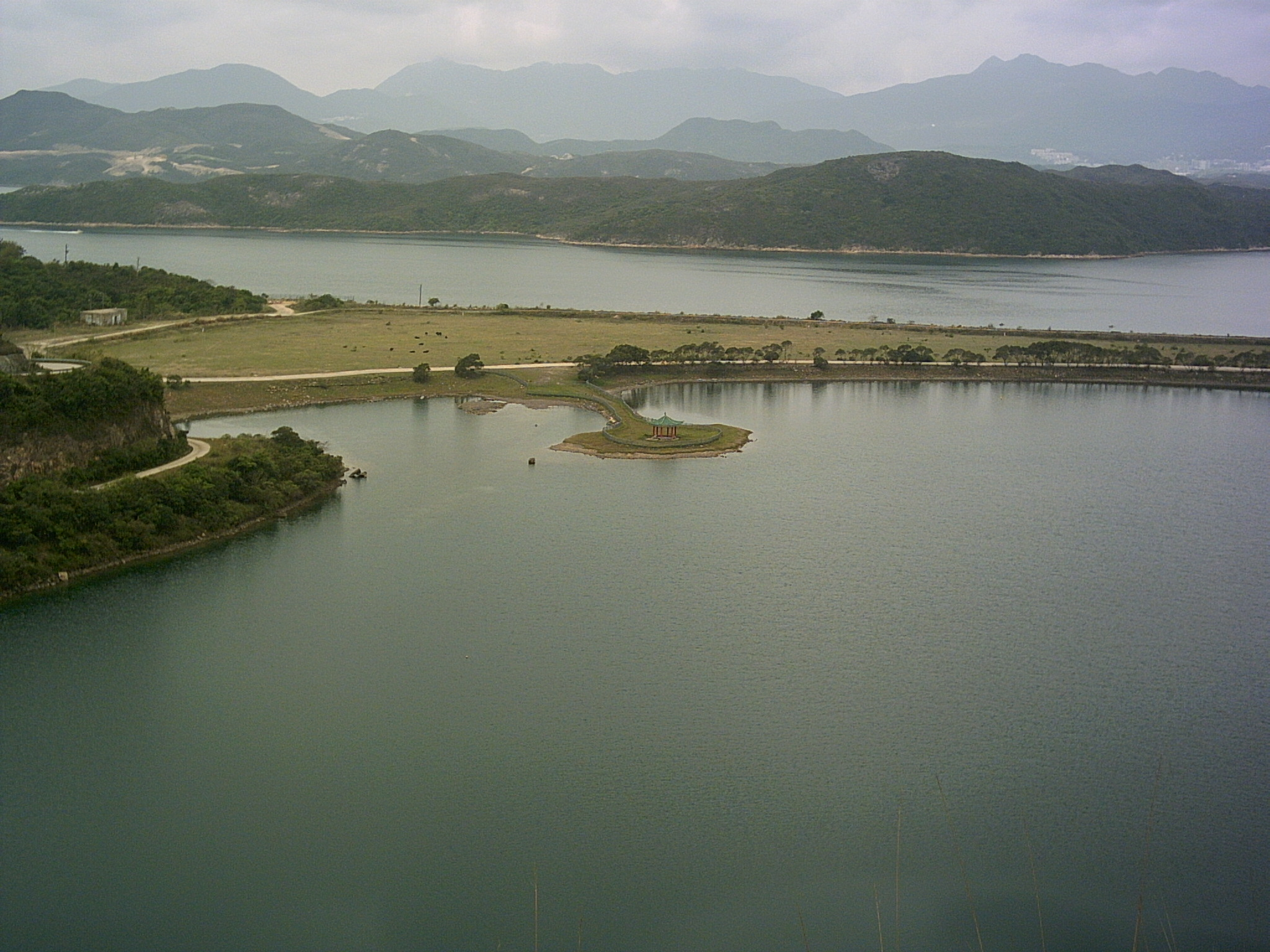
The site of the former High Island Detention Centre is now abundant of grass.

== See also ==
- Reservoirs of Hong Kong
- Lan Nai Wan
- Man Yee Wan New Village
- High Island Detention Centre
- Sai Kung East Country Park
- Hong Kong National Geopark
