= Luk Chau Shan =

Hill in Hong Kong

Coordinates: 22.398358°N 114.24105°E

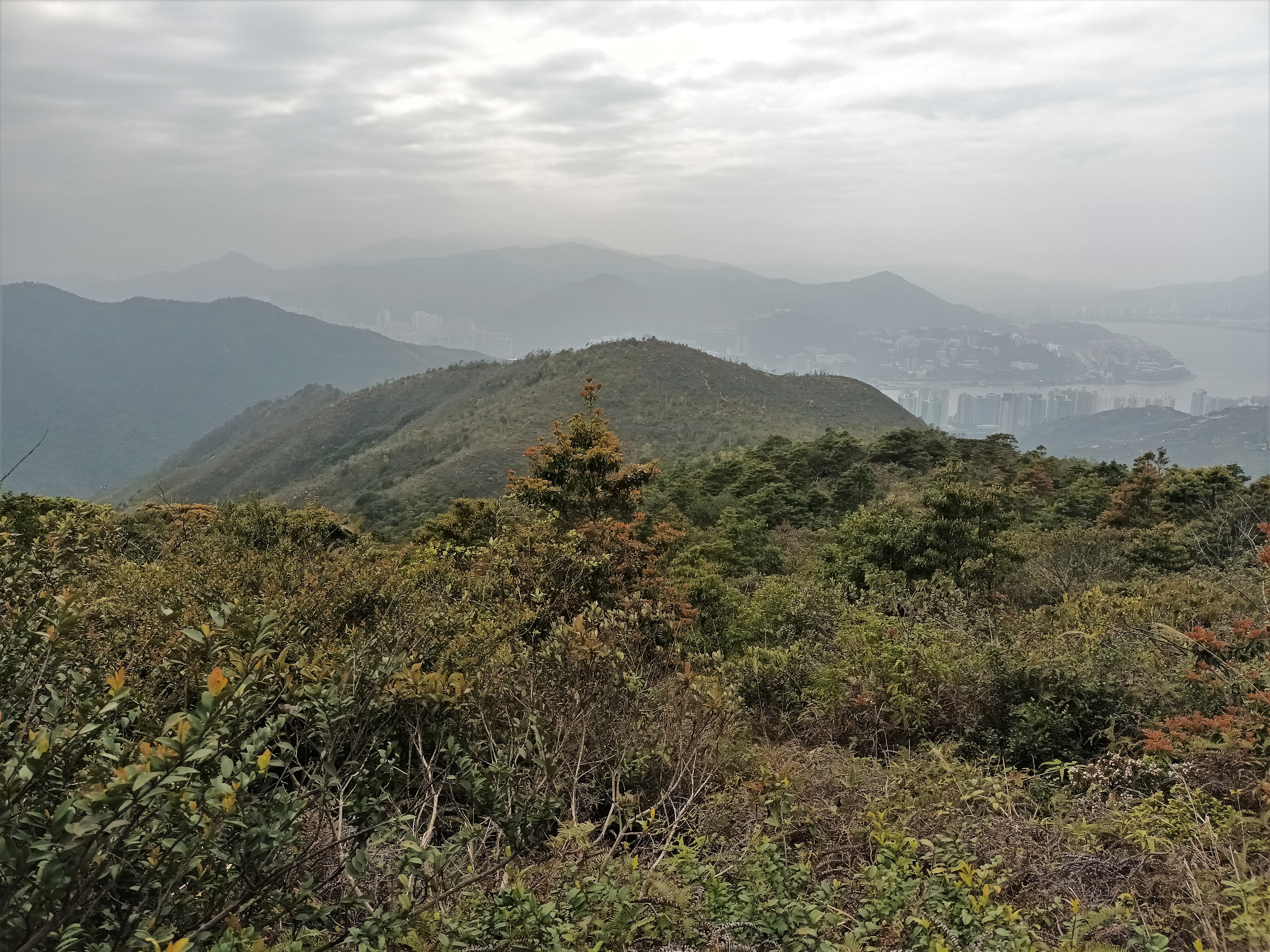
Luk Chau Shan viewed from the east from a nearby hill. Sha Tin Hoi and Tolo Harbour are visible in the background.

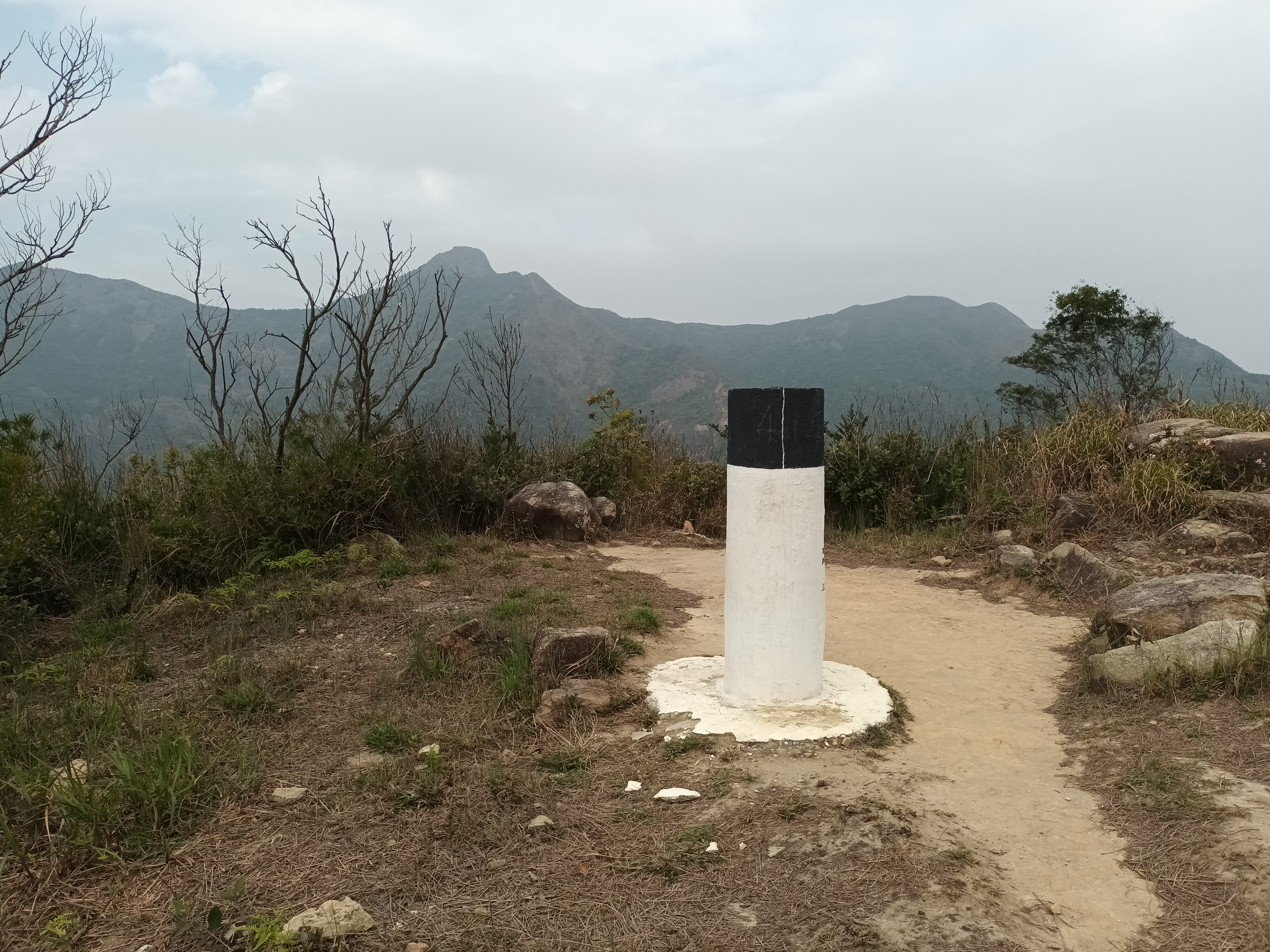
Trigonometrical station at the top of Luk Chau Shan. Ma On Shan is visible in the background.

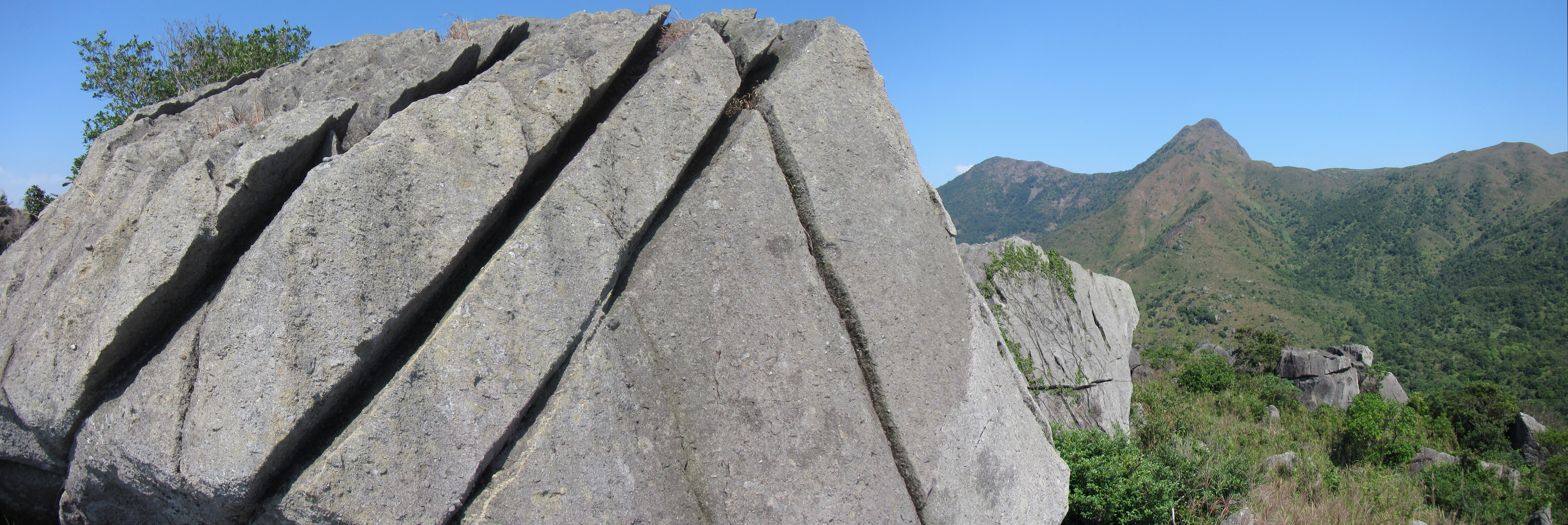
"Sword Test Rock" at Shek Lung Tsai. Ma On Shan is visible in the background.

Luk Chau Shan (Chinese: 鹿巢山) is a 414 m high hill in Ma On Shan Country Park, Hong Kong.

== History ==
Luk Chau Shan has been occasionally hit by wildfires, notably in 2008 and in 2020. The 2020 fire occurred in late February and lasted for 20 hours, during which over 80 hectares of land were burnt, including 55 hectares of country parks areas.

== Features ==
Shek Lung Tsai (石壟仔) and Shek Lung Tsai Stone Forest (石壟仔石林) are located in the vicinity of Luk Chau Shan. Several rocks there have received nicknames, including the "canoe rock" or "dragon boat rock", the "lizard rock" and the "crocodile rock".

== Access ==
Luk Chau Shan can be accessed via several footpaths from Mui Tsz Lam, Ma On Shan Village, Tai Shui Hang, Ngong Ping or Shui Long Wo.
