= Tiu Shau Ngam =

- 吊手岩
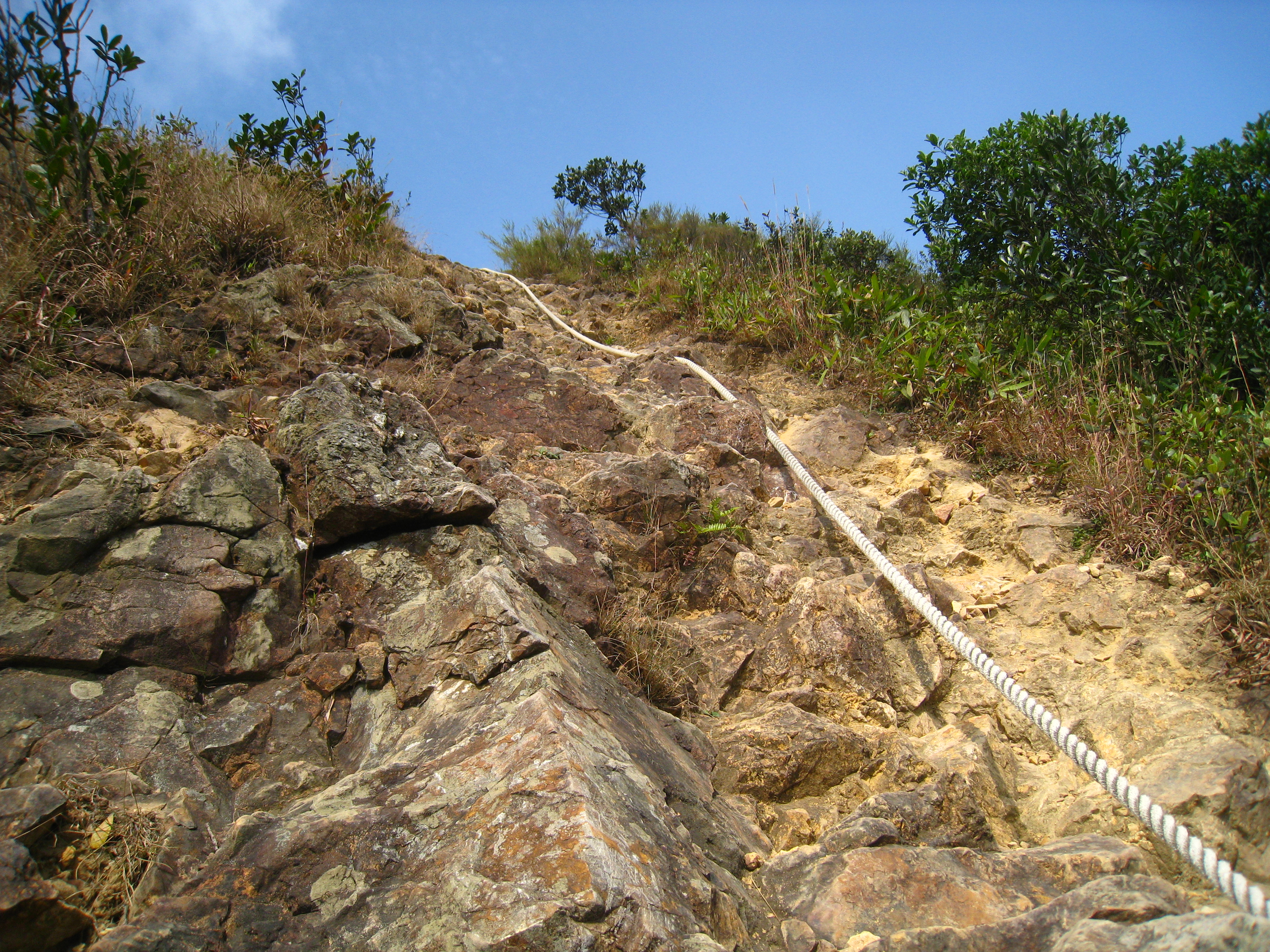
- A steep slope on Tiu Shau Ngam

Highest point
- Elevation: 588 m (1,929 ft)
- Coordinates: 22.413822°N 114.244553°E

Geography
- Location within Hong Kong

Tiu Shau Ngam (Chinese: 吊手岩; literally: "Hanging Hand Crag") is a mountain in Hong Kong with a height of 589 metres (1,932 ft). It is located north of Ma On Shan, the tallest mountain in the region.

It is part of the west ridge of The Hunch Backs and is a well-known precipitous peak. It is one of 16 "high-risk locations" for hikers in Hong Kong.

== See also ==
- List of mountains, peaks and hills in Hong Kong
- Ma On Shan Country Park
