= Ma On Shan =

Ma On Shan may refer to:

- Ma On Shan (peak) (simplified Chinese: 马鞍山; traditional Chinese: 馬鞍山; lit. 'saddle peak'), a mountain in the New Territories of Hong Kong
- Ma On Shan (town), a New Town in the New Territories on the foot of Ma On Shan mountain
- Ma On Shan line, now part of Tuen Ma line, a railway line in Hong Kong
- Ma On Shan station, an elevated train station in Hong Kong
- Ma On Shan Village, a historic mining village in Hong Kong

== See also ==
- Ma'anshan (simplified Chinese: 马鞍山; traditional Chinese: 馬鞍山; pinyin: Mǎ'ānshān), a city in Anhui Province, People's Republic of China
- Maanshan Nuclear Power Plant in Pingtung County, Taiwan
