= Pyramid Hill =

Pyramid Hill may refer to:

- Pyramid Hill (Hong Kong), a peak in eastern New Territories of Hong Kong (part of Ma On Shan Country Park)
- Pyramid Hill, Victoria, a town in Victoria, Australia in the Shire of Loddon
- Pyramid Hill Sculpture Park and Museum, Hamilton, Ohio, US

== See also ==
- Pyramid Hills, a mountain range in Kings County, California, US
