= Ma On Shan Country Park =

Country park in the New Territories, Hong Kong

Coordinates: 22.4120°N 114.2479°E

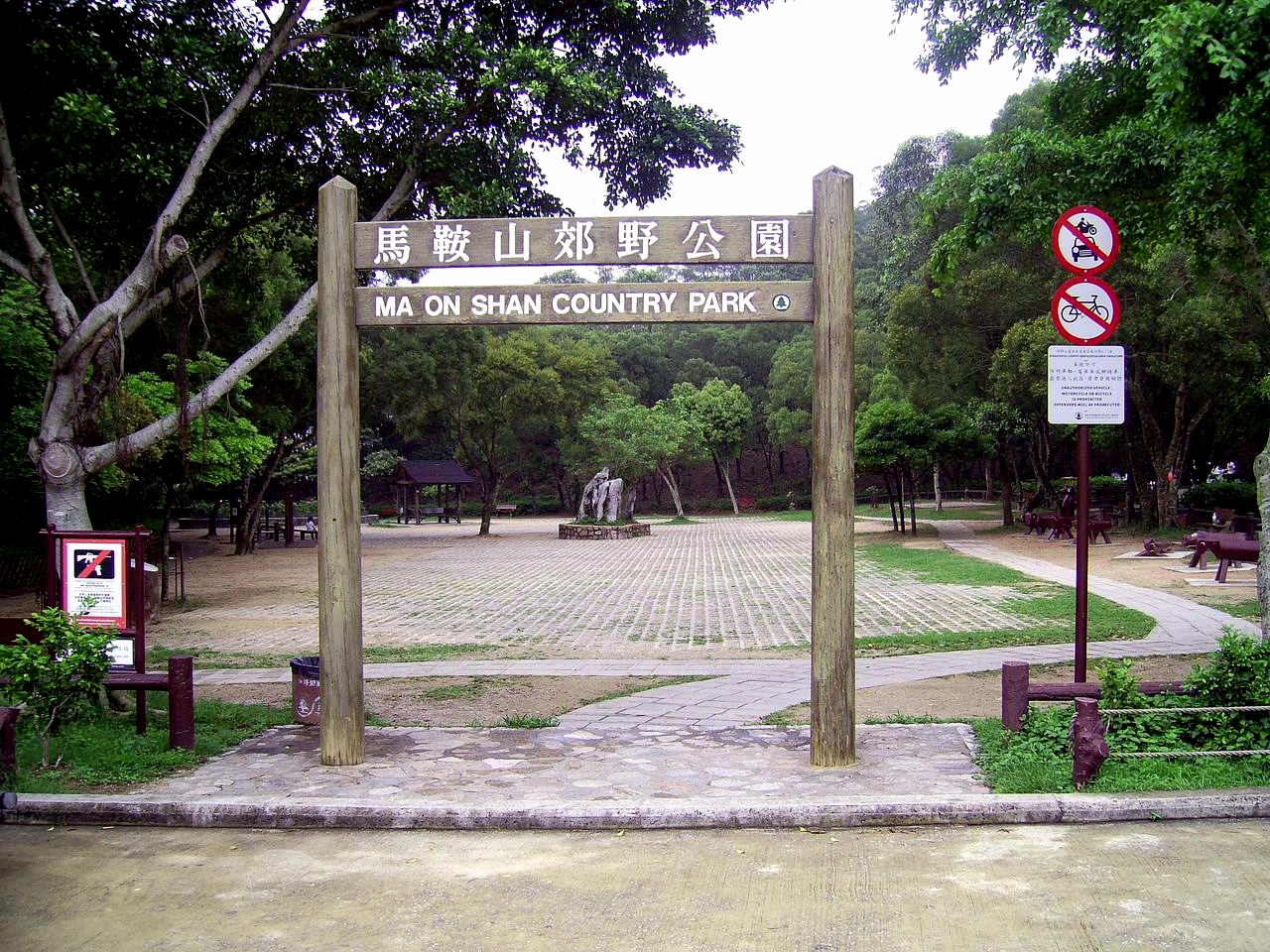
- Traditional Chinese: 馬鞍山郊野公園
- Simplified Chinese: 马鞍山郊野公园
Transcriptions
Standard Mandarin
- Hanyu Pinyin: Mǎ'ānshān Jiāoyě Gōngyuán
Yue: Cantonese
- Jyutping: maa5 on1 saan1 gaau1 je5 gung1 jyun4

Ma On Shan Country Park

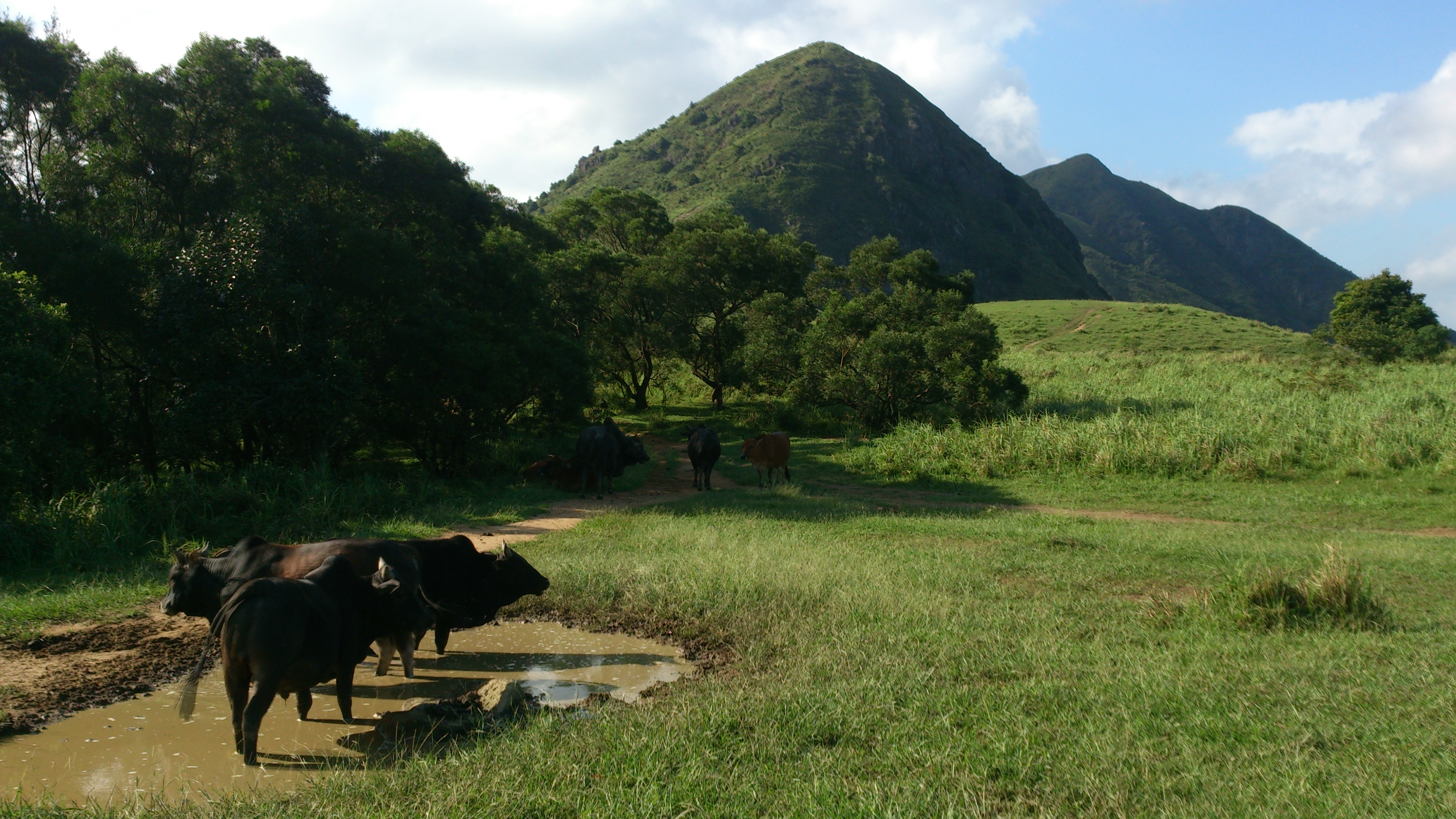
Pyramid Hill viewed from the Ngong Ping plateau.

Ma On Shan Country Park (Chinese: 馬鞍山郊野公園) is a park located in the central neck of the Sai Kung Peninsula in the eastern New Territories of Hong Kong. The park covers an area of 28.8 square kilometres (11.1 sq mi) and links Sai Kung Country Park and Lion Rock Country Park to form an extensive recreation area on the Ma On Shan massif.

== History ==
The country park was established on 27 April 1979.

In 1998, Ma On Shan Country Park was reduced in size by around 0.1 hectares (0.25 acres) near Nai Chung in order to accommodate the widening of Sai Sha Road. The revised park boundary came into effect on 18 December 1998.

== Sightseeing ==
Apart from a separate section of the park on the Pak Sha Wan Peninsula, much of Ma On Shan Country Park is inland. Distant vistas of the sea and off-shore islands open up from many of the high vantage points within the park's boundaries, but most of the exploring keeps you far from the coast.

== Mountains ==
Mountains within Ma On Shan Country Park include Buffalo Hill and West Buffalo Hill, Cheung Shan, Kowloon Peak, Luk Chau Shan, Ma On Shan, Nui Po Shan, Pyramid Hill, Shek Nga Shan, Tate's Cairn, The Hunch Backs, Tiu Shau Ngam. The Ngong Ping plateau is also locateau within the park.

== Iron mine of Ma On Shan ==
Iron mining had long been carried out at Ma On Shan. The lease of the Ma On Shan Iron Mine expired in 1981 and the mine closed subsequently.

== Vegetation ==
Most of these hills are somewhat bare in terms of vegetation. Their inaccessibility made it uneconomic to carry out afforestation when tree planting was necessary for fuel supply; the mainly volcanic slopes are inhospitable to all but the hardiest plants. Nevertheless, some unusual pockets of vegetation have survived over the years and even the ruined slopes of Ma On Shan are notable for their wild rhododendron, orchids and some unusual ferns.

== Wildlife ==
The secluded and unspoilt surroundings have fostered a range of wildlife within the park. Pangolin, barking deer, porcupine and wild boar are still seen from time to time.

== Hiking trails ==
- Ma On Shan Country Trail - From Ma On Shan Village to Tai Shui Tseng via Ngong Ping.
- Wilson Trail - Stage 4 is from Tseng Lan Shue to Sha Tin Pass via Tai Lo Au.
- MacLehose Trail - Stage 4 and 5, starting from Kei Ling Ha to Tate's Cairn (Gilwell Campsite) and then to Tai Po Road via Sha Tin Pass.

== See also ==
- Geography of Hong Kong
- Country parks and conservation in Hong Kong
- List of areas of Hong Kong
