= Ngong Ping, Ma On Shan =

Plateau in Hong Kong

Coordinates: 22.39118°N 114.252395°E

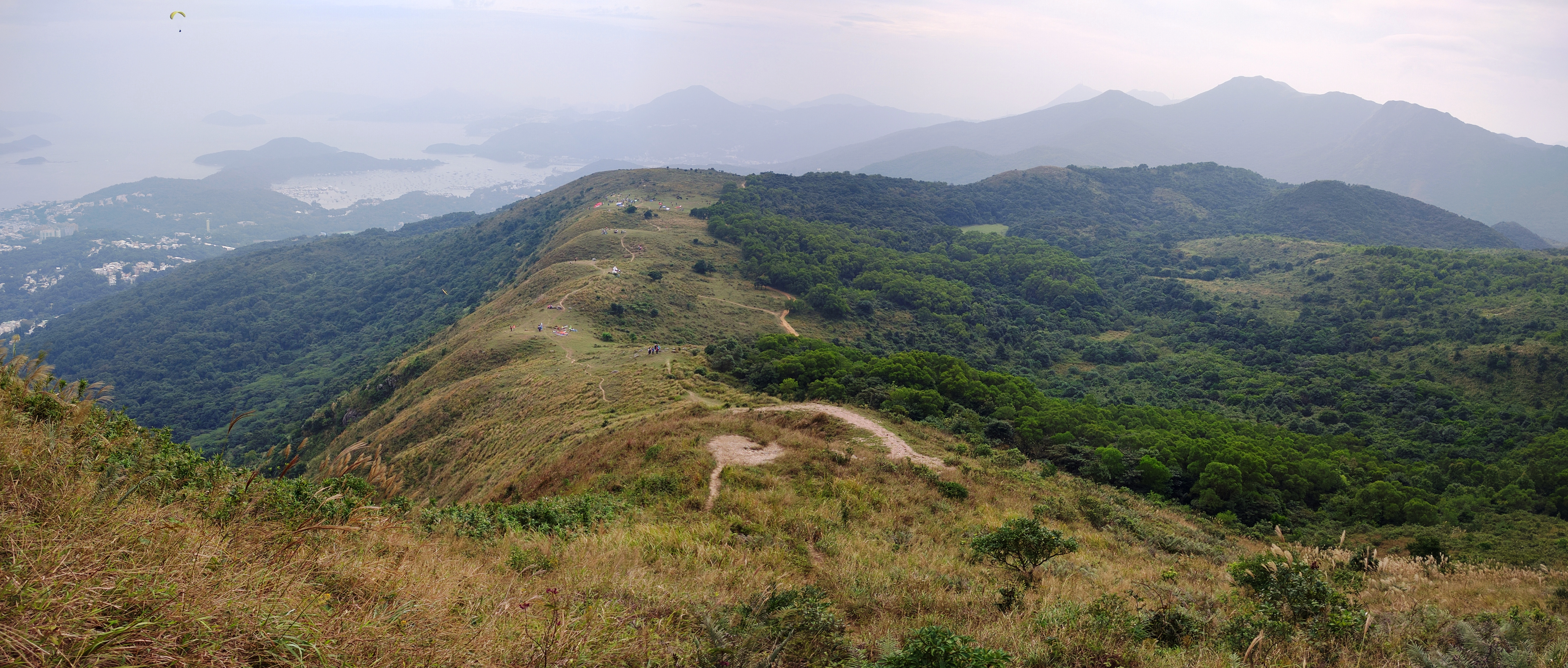
Ngong Ping, Ma On Shan viewed from Pyramid Hill.

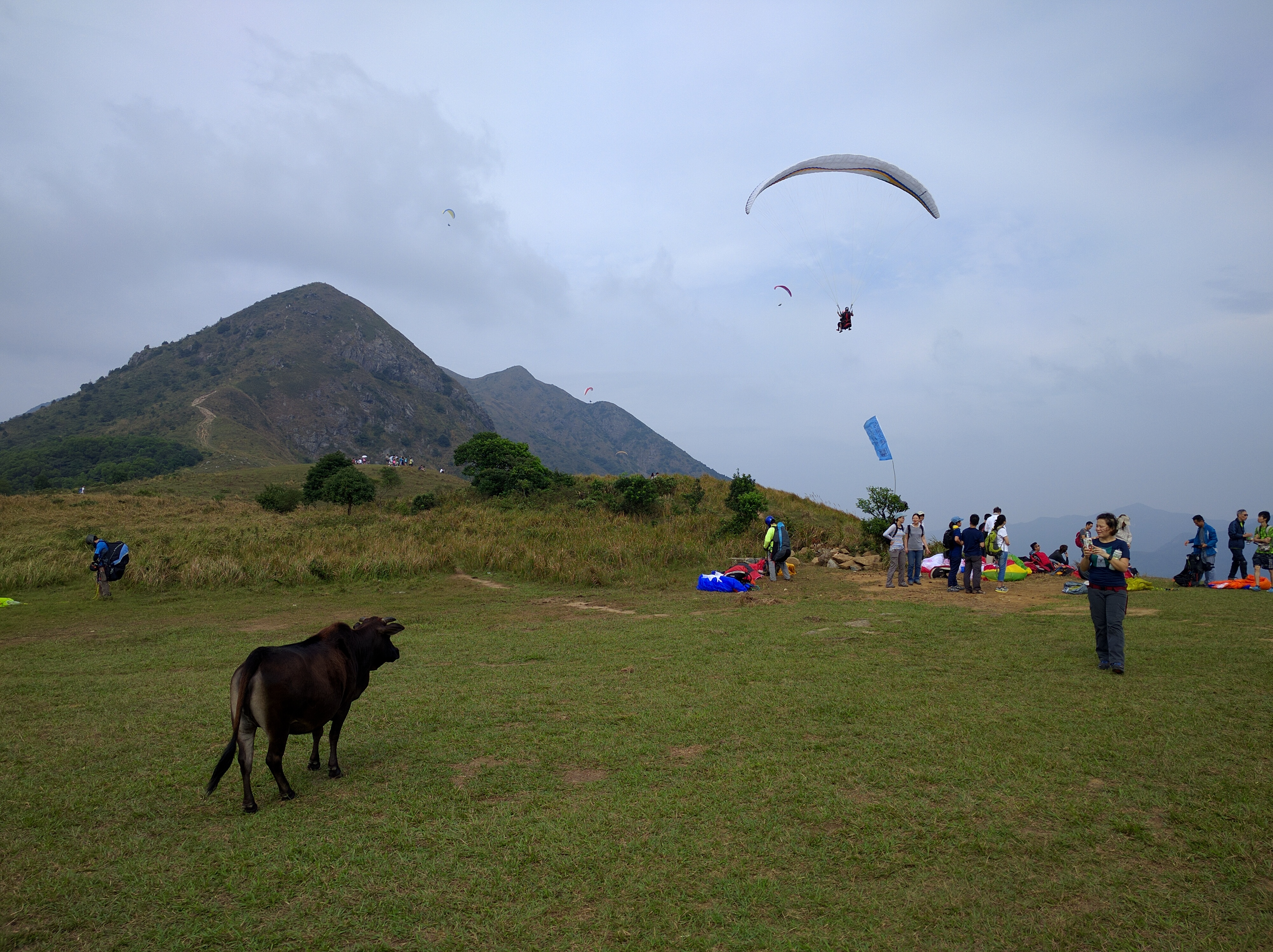
Paragliding at Ngong Ping. The hill in the background is Pyramid Hill.

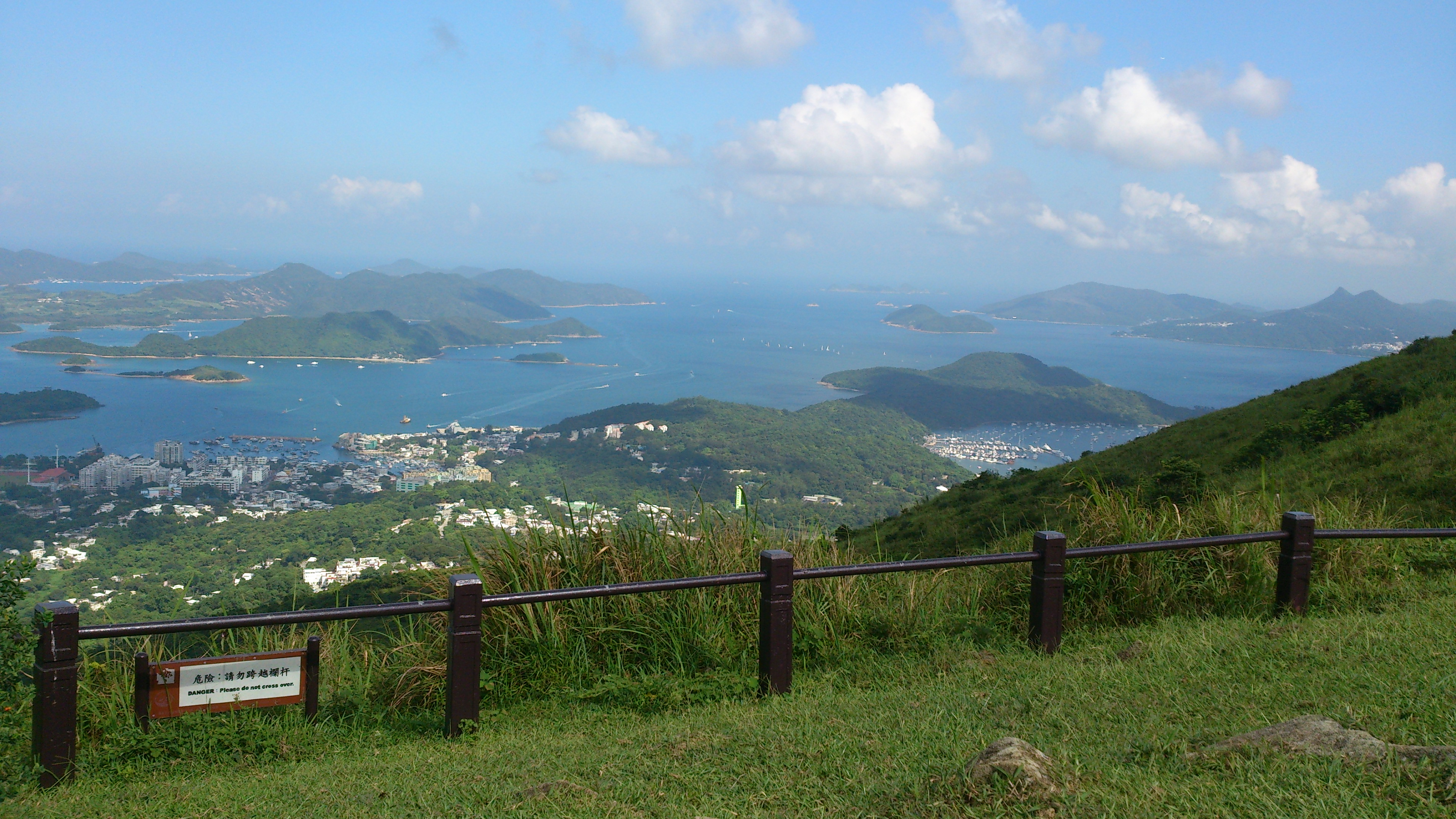
View of Sai Kung Town, Port Shelter, Pak Sha Wan Peninsula and nearby islands from Ngong Ping.

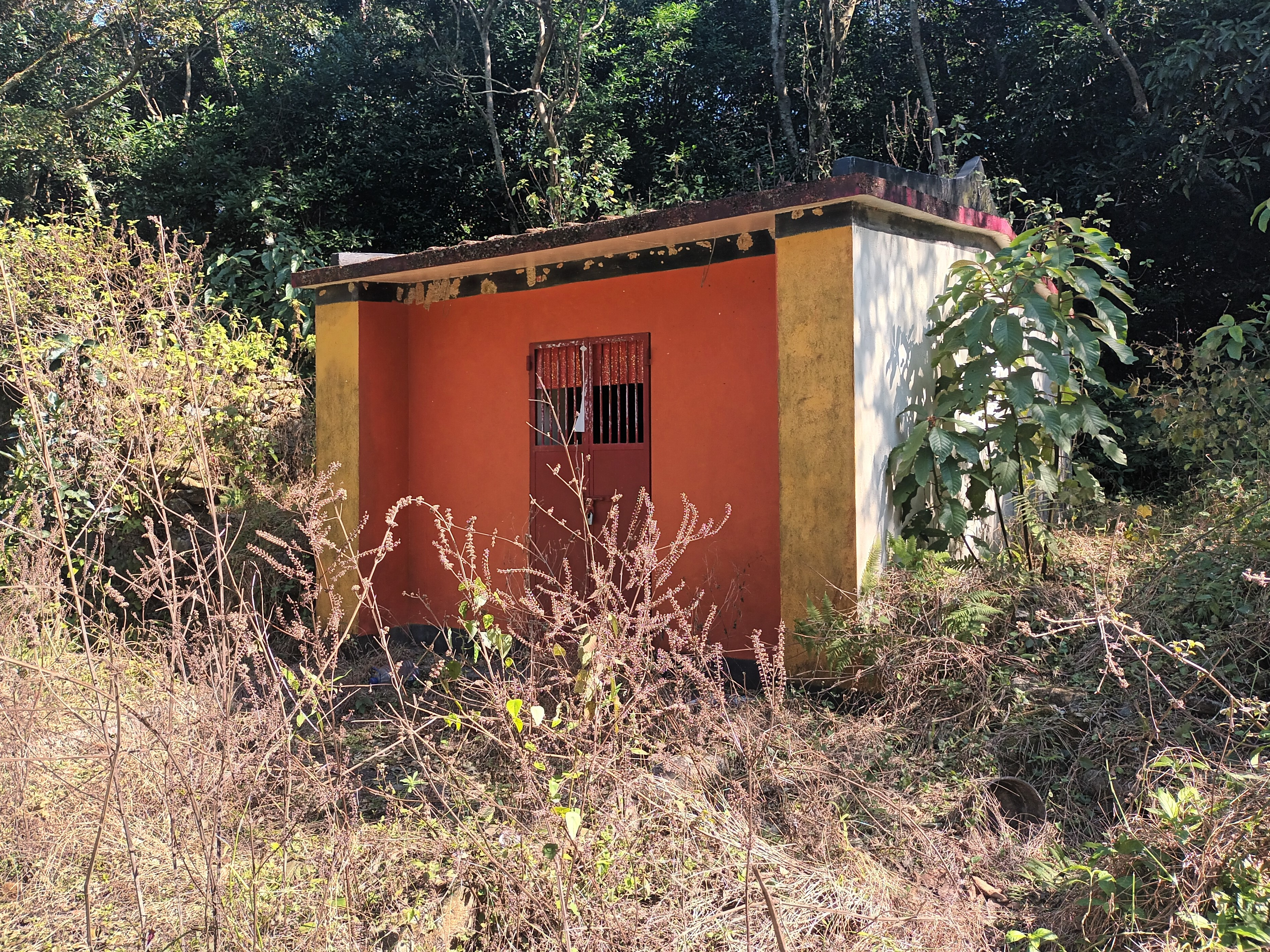
Kuet's Ancestral Hall (闕氏宗祠), in the ruined Ngong Ping Village.

Ngong Ping (Chinese: 昂平) is a plateau in Ma On Shan, New Territories, Hong Kong. Located within Ma On Shan Country Park, it is administratively part of Sha Tin District.

== History ==
Ngong Ping was historically the site of a village. It is still a recognized village under the New Territories Small House Policy.

At the time of the 1911 census, the population of Ngong Ping was 9. The number of males was 7.

== Campsite ==
Ngong Ping Campsite
- Interactive map of Ngong Ping Campsite
- Location: Hong Kong
- Nearest city: Ma On Shan, Sha Tin District
- Governing body: Agriculture, Fisheries and Conservation Department

Ngong Ping has a camp site with 20 spots for tents for overnight camping, offering barbeques pits, benches, tables and drains as well as dry pit toilets. The campsite area is hilly surrounded by grass, rocks and low lying shrubs.

== Access ==
Users of the campsite can reach the area by minibus from Sunshine City in Yiu On Estate or Sai Kung Town then walk from the bus terminus from Ma On Shan Village and Po Lo Che respectively.

The MacLehose Trail Section 4 and the Ma On Shan Country Trail pass through Ngong Ping. These two trails with rugged and rocky terrain are more suitable for experienced hikers.

== See also ==
- Pyramid Hill (Hong Kong)
