= Pyramid Hill (Hong Kong) =

Mountain in Hong Kong

- 大金鐘
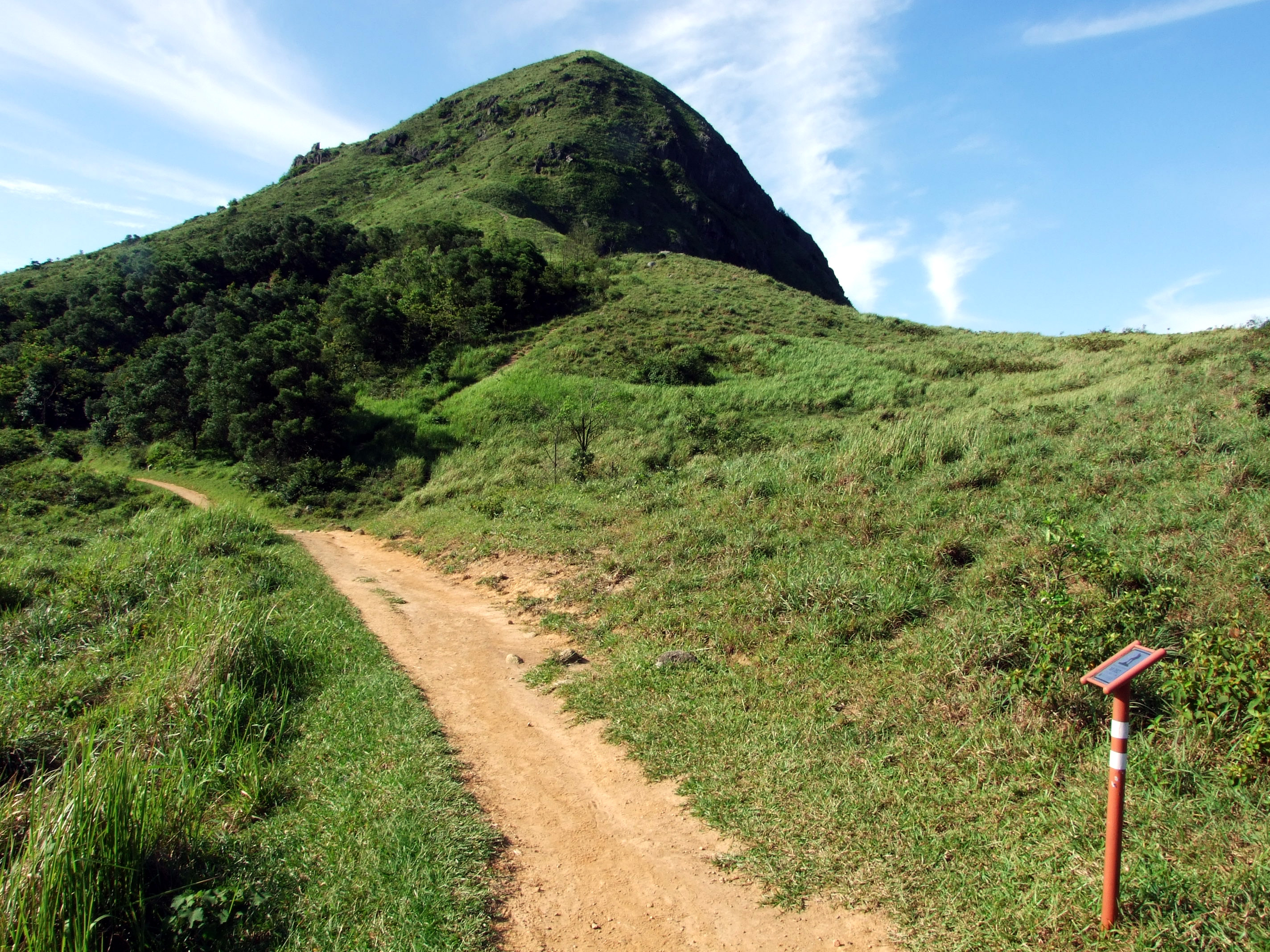
- View of Pyramid Hill from MacLehose Trail Stage 4

Highest point
- Elevation: 536 m (1,759 ft)
- Coordinates: 22°23′48.92″N 114°15′9.7″E

Geography
- Location within Hong Kong
- Location: Hong Kong

Pyramid Hill or Tai Kam Chung (Chinese: 大金鐘; literally: Large Golden Bell) is a peak in eastern New Territories of Hong Kong. With a height of 536 metres (1,759 ft), it stands among the highest mountains in Hong Kong. The mountain is located inside Ma On Shan Country Park, between Ma On Shan and Sai Kung. Its pyramidal shape lends the hill its name.

== Gallery ==
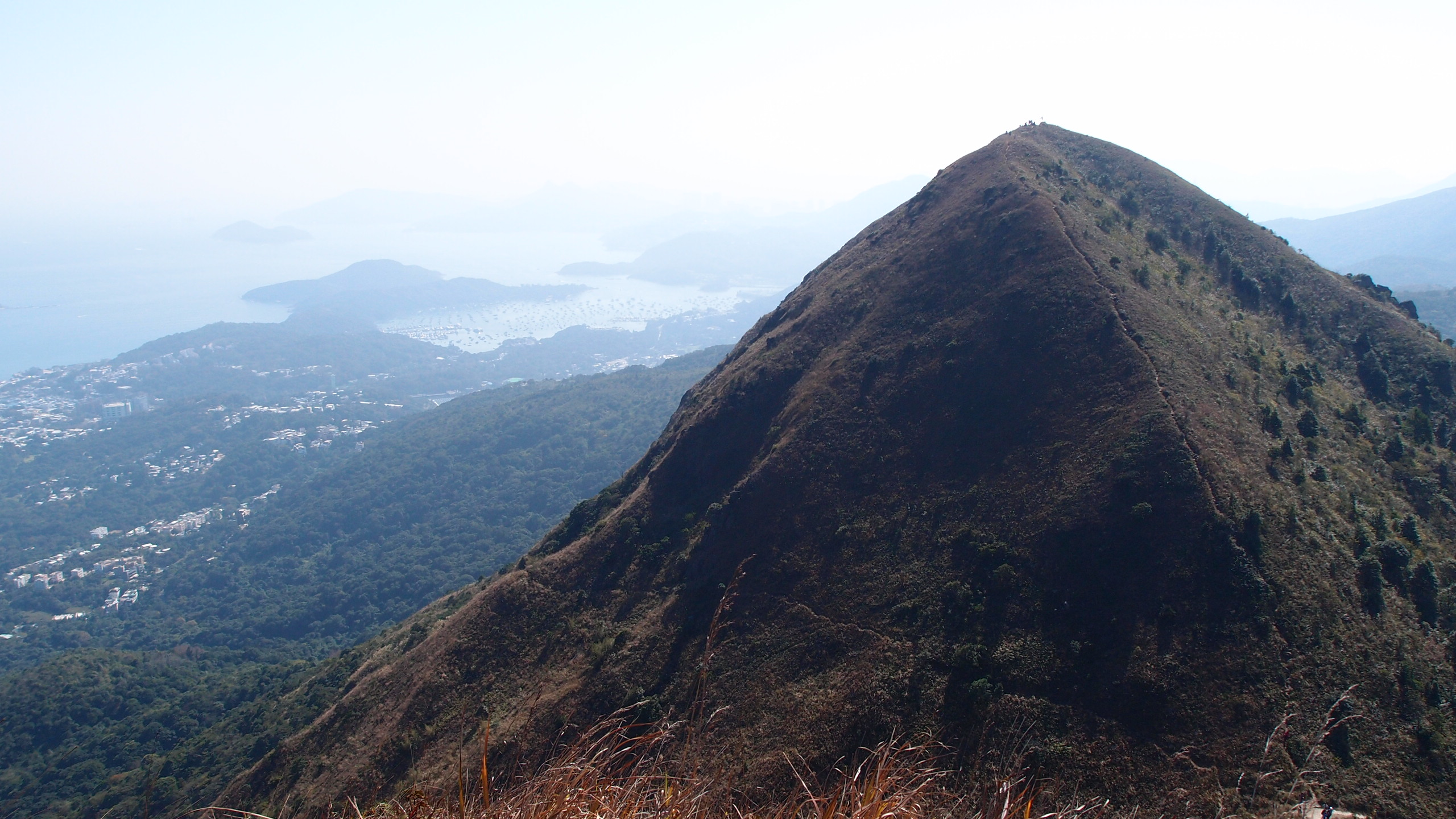
Another view of Pyramid Hill

== See also ==
- List of mountains, peaks and hills in Hong Kong
- Ma On Shan - tallest peak in Ma On Shan Country Park
- Ngong Ping, Ma On Shan
