= Ma On Shan Country Trail =

Hiking trail in Hong Kong

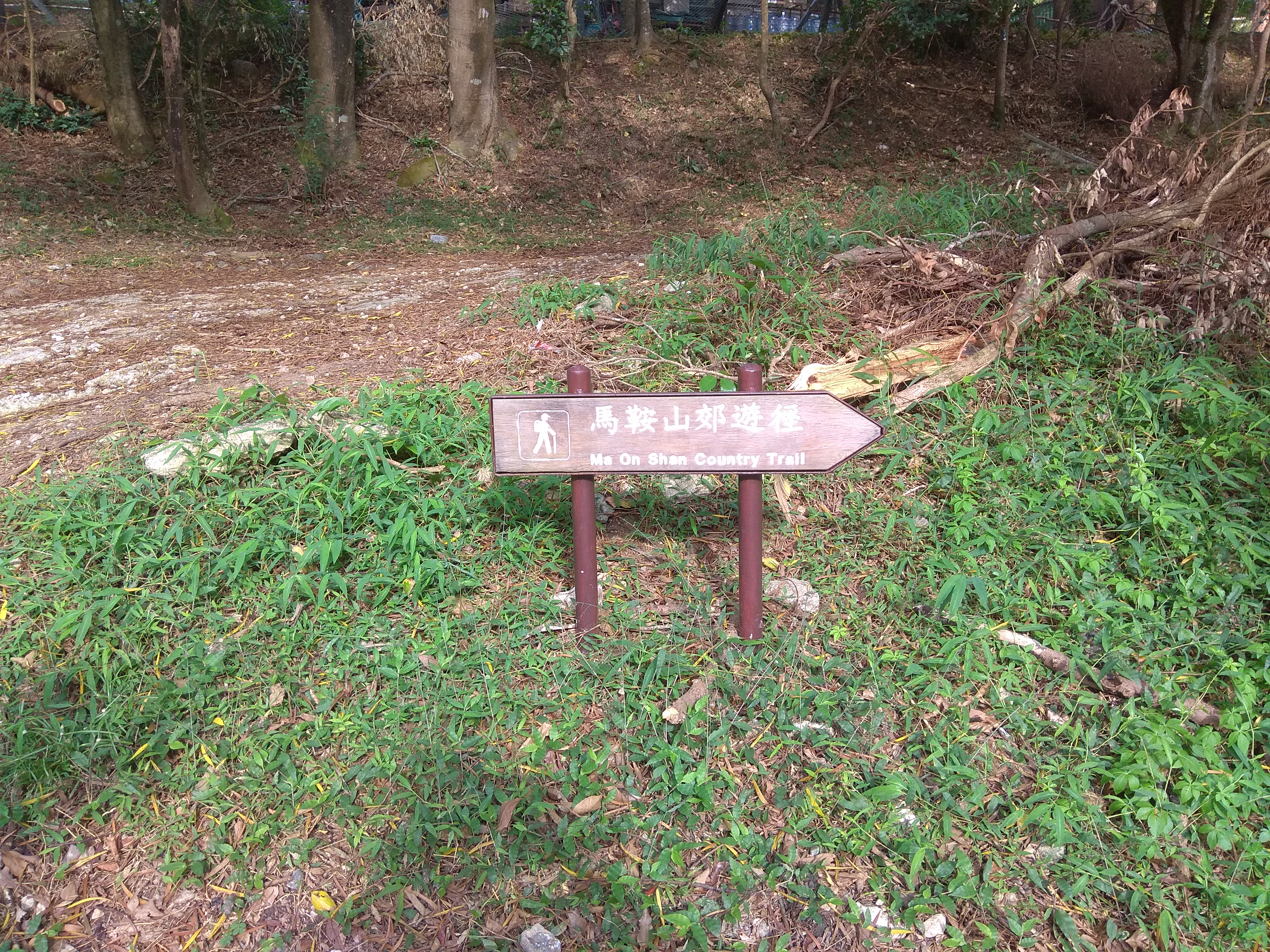
- Ma On Shan Country Trail sign along Ma On Shan Tsuen Road.
- Location: Hong Kong
- Use: Hiking

The Ma On Shan Country Trail (Chinese: 馬鞍山郊遊徑) is a hiking trail in Ma On Shan Country Park, Hong Kong, running from Ma On Shan Village to Tai Shui Tseng (大水井) via Ngong Ping.

== See also ==
- List of hiking trails in Hong Kong
