= Mining in Hong Kong =

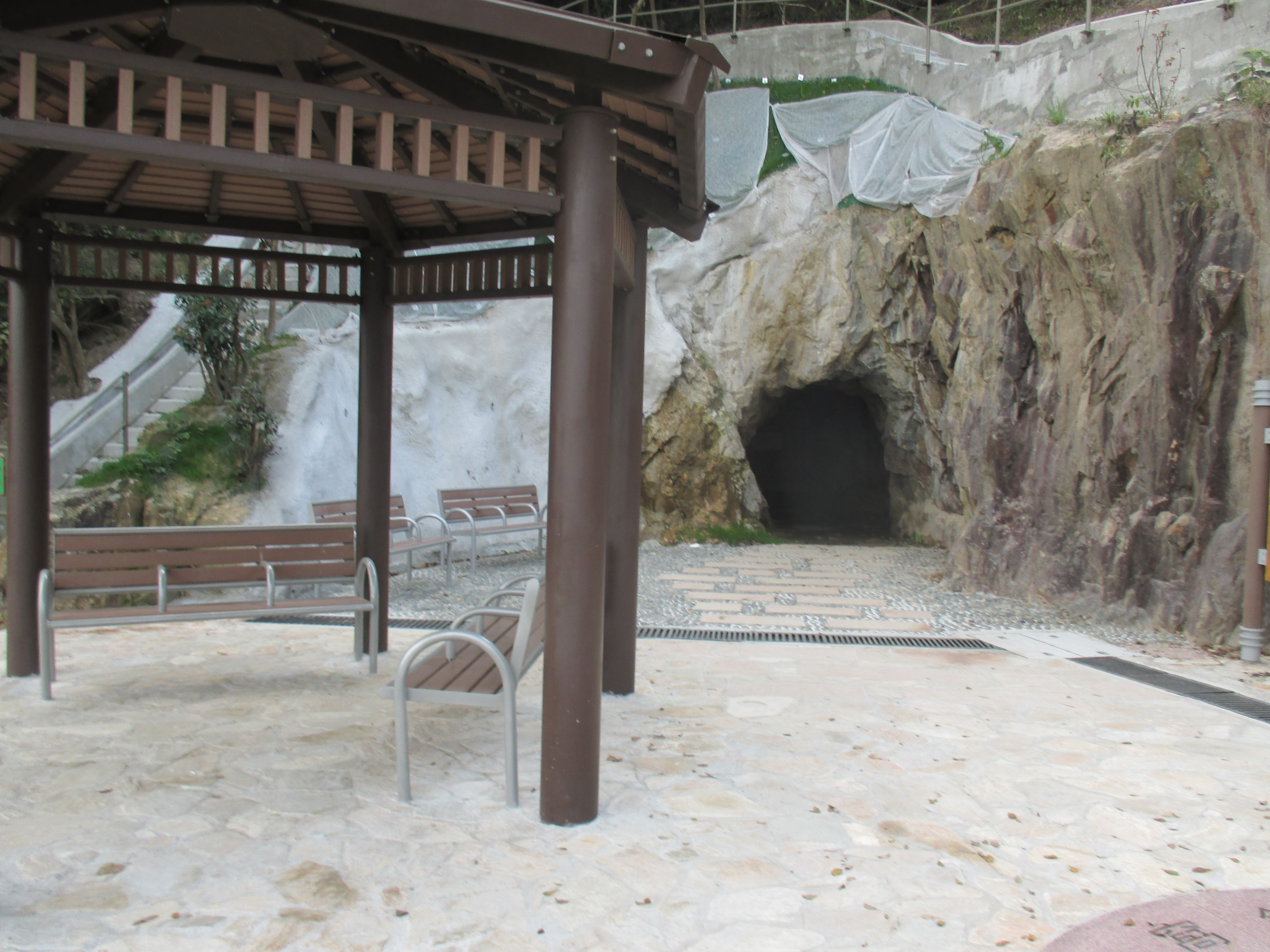
Entrance of Silvermine Cave in Mui Wo, Lantau Island.

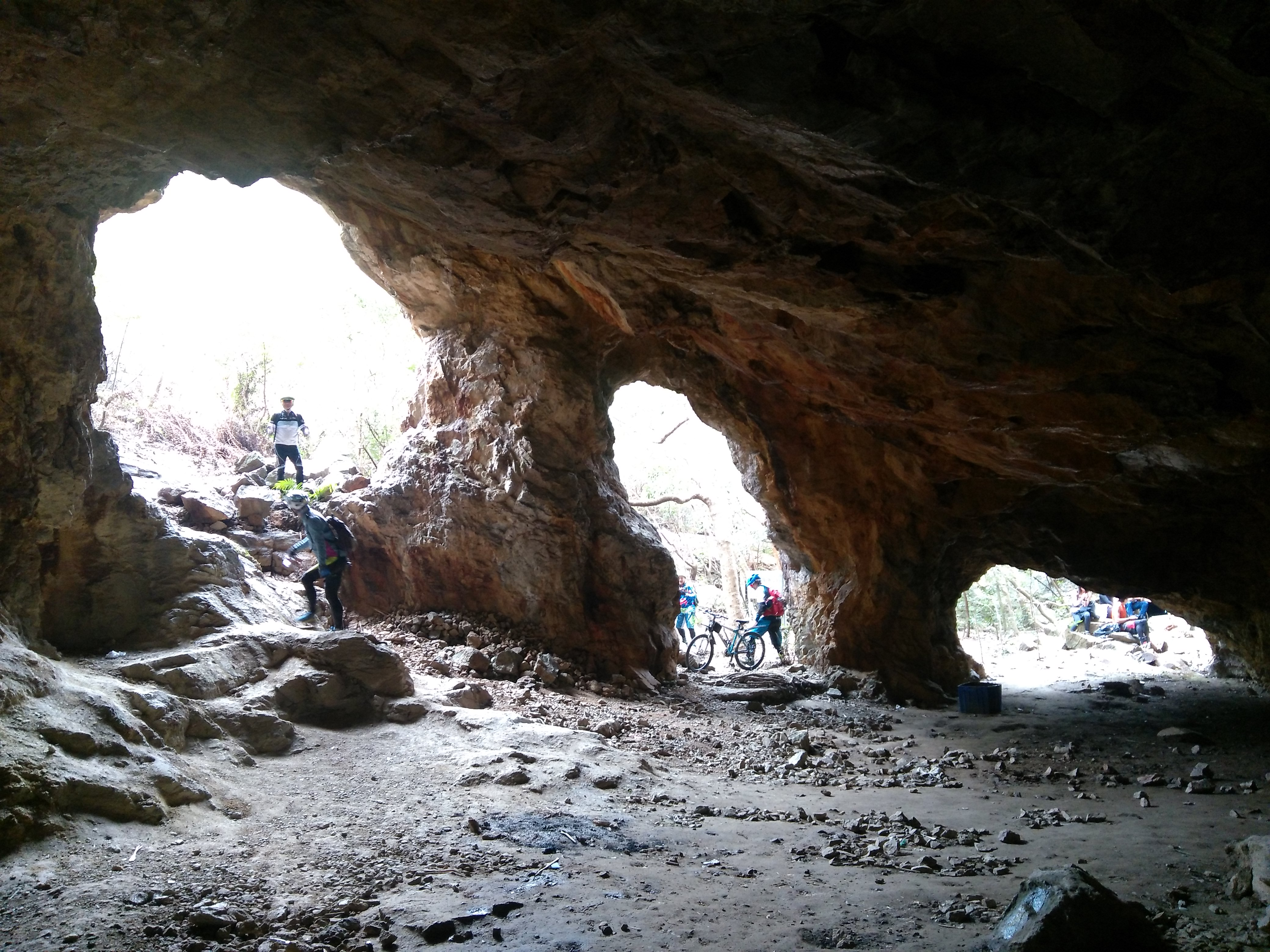
Lin Ma Hang Lead Mine in 2018.

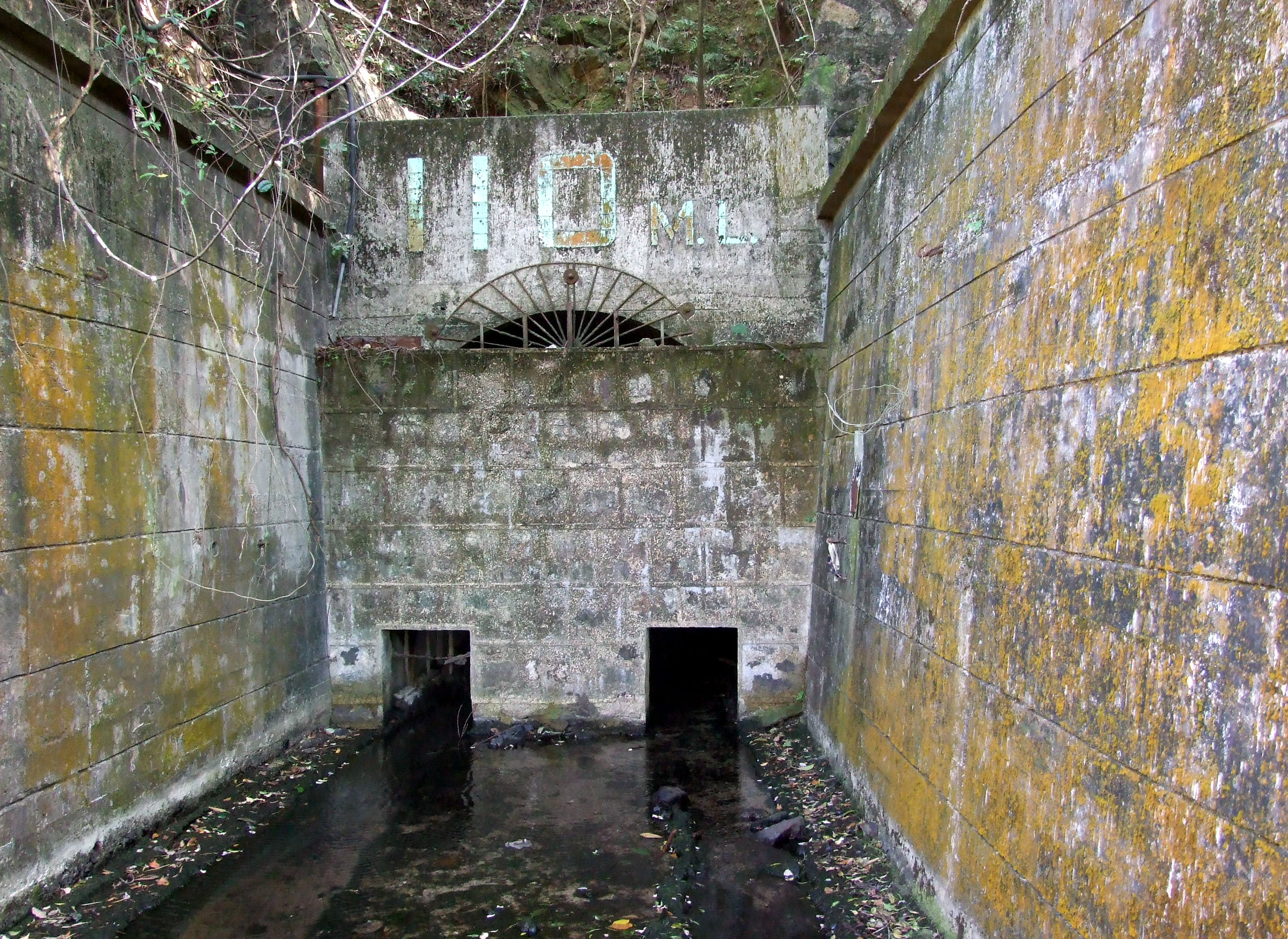
Exterior walls of 110 ML of Ma On Shan Iron Mine.

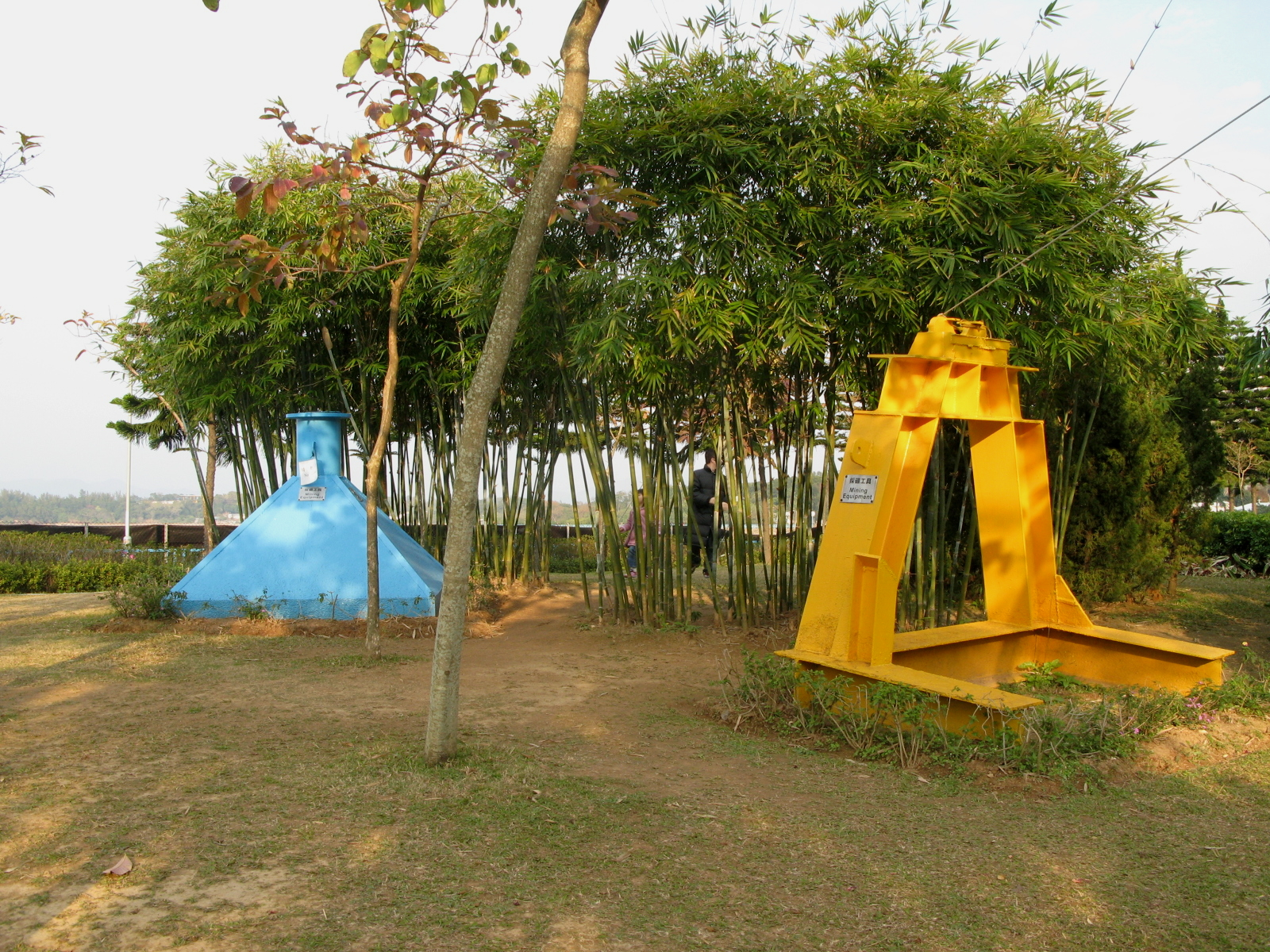
Ma On Shan Park mining history display area.

Mining in Hong Kong refers to mining activities in Hong Kong. Despite its small size, Hong Kong has a relatively large number of mineral deposits. Although some have been mined commercially, there are currently no commercial mining operations in Hong Kong.

== Mines ==
The four main mines in Hong Kong are the Lin Ma Hang Lead Mine (mainly galena for lead), the Needle Hill Tungsten Mine (Wolframite and Molybdenite), the Ma On Shan Iron Mine (magnetite for iron), and the West Brother Graphite Mine (graphite).

Historical mines in Hong Kong include: (The figures indicate the length of the tunnels)

- Lin Ma Hang 0.9 km
- Needle Hill 3.4 km
- Lin Fa Shan, Tsuen Wan 2.3 km
- Ma On Shan 23.5 km
- West Brother Island extensive
- Sha Lo Wan Mines 0.3 km (Lantau Island)
- Mui Wo (Silver Mine Bay) (Lantau Island)

== Types of mining ==
=== Iron ===
The largest iron deposit is found at Ma On Shan, where the Ma On Shan Iron Mine was in operation from 1906 to 1976.

=== Lead ===
Lead was firstly discovered around 1860s in Lin Ma Hang. The first mining company was formed in 1917 and operated for only three years. A 75-year mining lease was issued in 1925. The mine ownership changed in 1932 and again in 1937. At that time, 2.1 kilometres of tunnels had been developed and this was extended by the new owner, but all work was suspended in 1940 due to World War II. Small-scale mining was carried out by the Japanese from 1941-1945, mostly by robbing pillars in the eastern section of the mine, which caused a cave-in. Afterwards, the mine remained abandoned until 1951 when various contractors resumed activities. Labor unrest, strikes, typhoon damage and falling lead price led to the closure of the mine on 30 June 1958 with about 60% of reserves remaining. The mining lease expired in April 1962.

=== Silver ===
Mui Wo, on Lantau island, is located on Silvermine Bay, so named for the silver mines that were once worked along the Silver River which flows through the village. The nearby Silvermine Cave was mined for galena, a mineral which is mostly lead but contains small amounts of silver, during the second half of the 19th century.

=== Tungsten ===
Tungsten deposits were first discovered in 1935 at Needle Hill. A mining license was issued in the same year and the mining development started in 1938 and continued through the Japanese occupation period. Mining activities increased during the Korean War when the price of tungsten rose sharply. By 1967, the tungsten price had declined and the labor cost had risen, prompting the suspension of the mining operation.

Tungsten was discovered in Sha Lo Wan, and its ore was quarried in the area in the 1950s, leading to a population increase, which reached 4,000 in 1971. The population has dropped again since the 1970s.

== Legal aspects ==
Under the Mining Ordinance Chapter 285, power to grant mining and prospecting licences is vested in the Commissioner of Mines who is, as of 2020, the Director of Civil Engineering and Development.

== Quarries ==
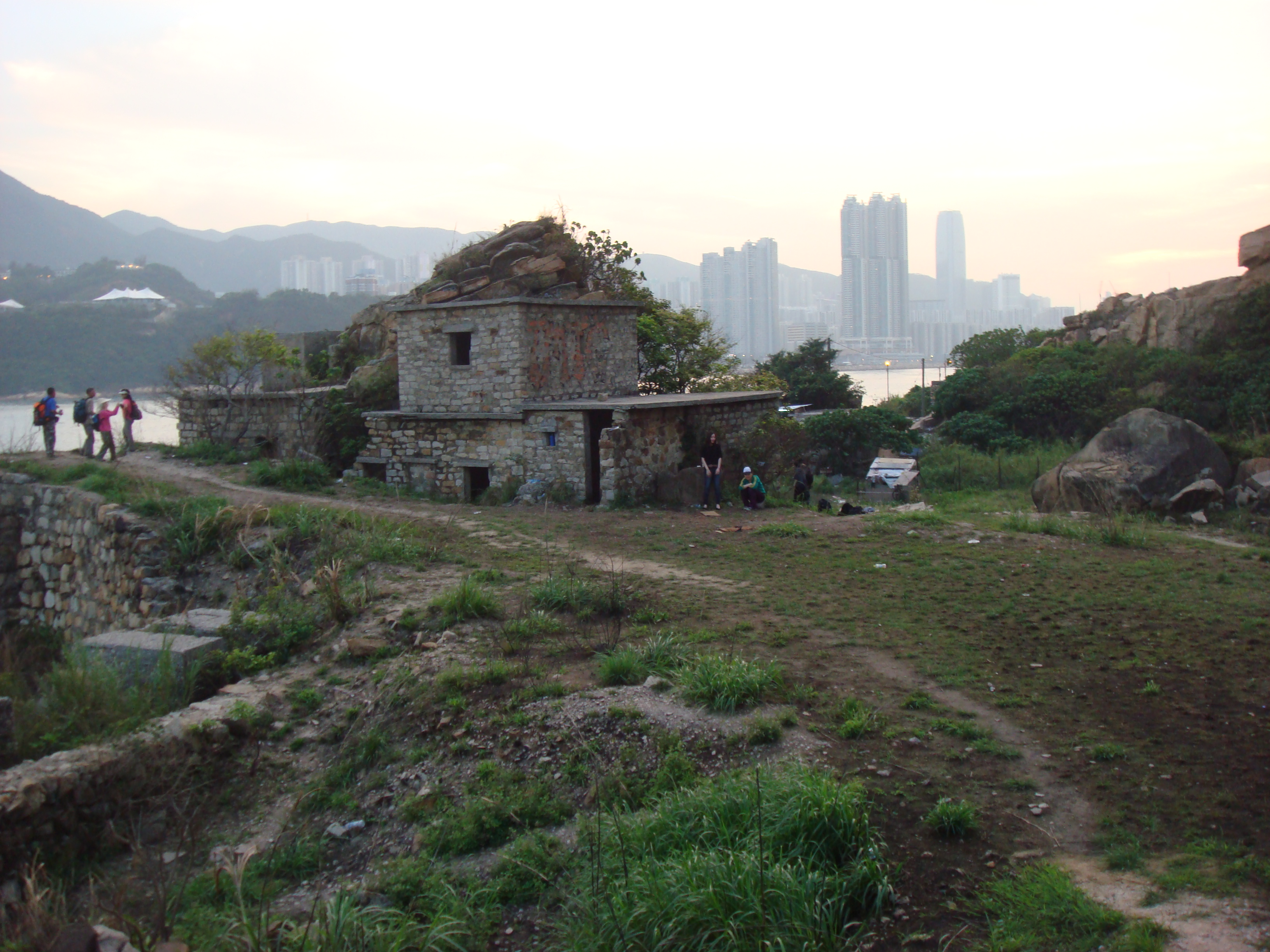
Old Quarry Site Structures at Lei Yue Mun, Kowloon.

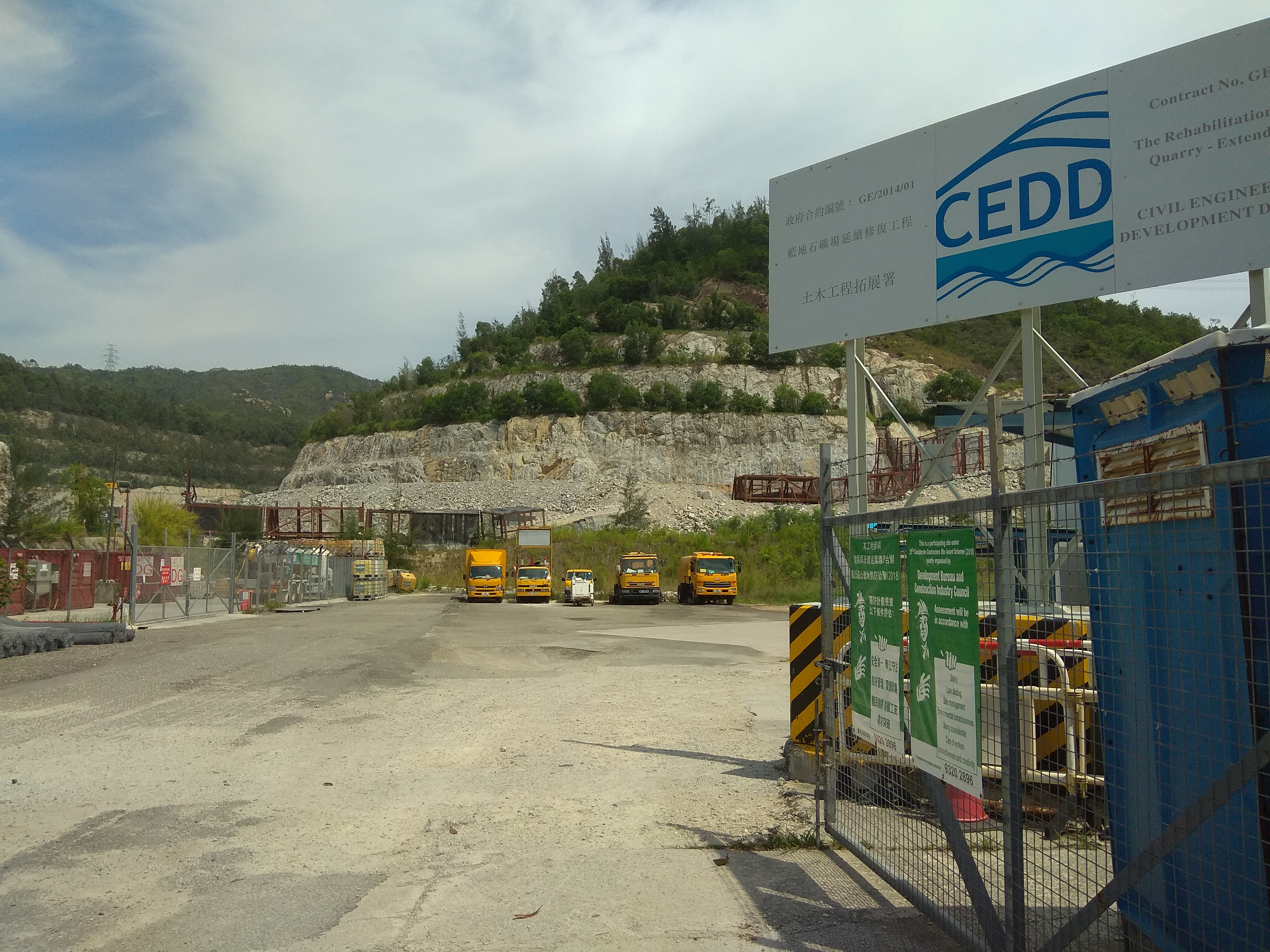
Quarry in Lam Tei, Tuen Mun District.

Current and former quarries in Hong Kong include:

- Anderson Road Quarry
- Four hills of Kowloon, historically the site of granite quarries in Kwun Tong District
- Lamma Quarry
- Quarry Hill
- Shek O Quarry
- Turret Hill Quarry, exploited from the mid-1960s to 1984

== See also ==
- Economy of Hong Kong
- Geology of Hong Kong
- Energy in Hong Kong
