= Ma On Shan Iron Mine =

Abandoned mine in Hong Kong

Coordinates: 22.403394°N 114.244756°E

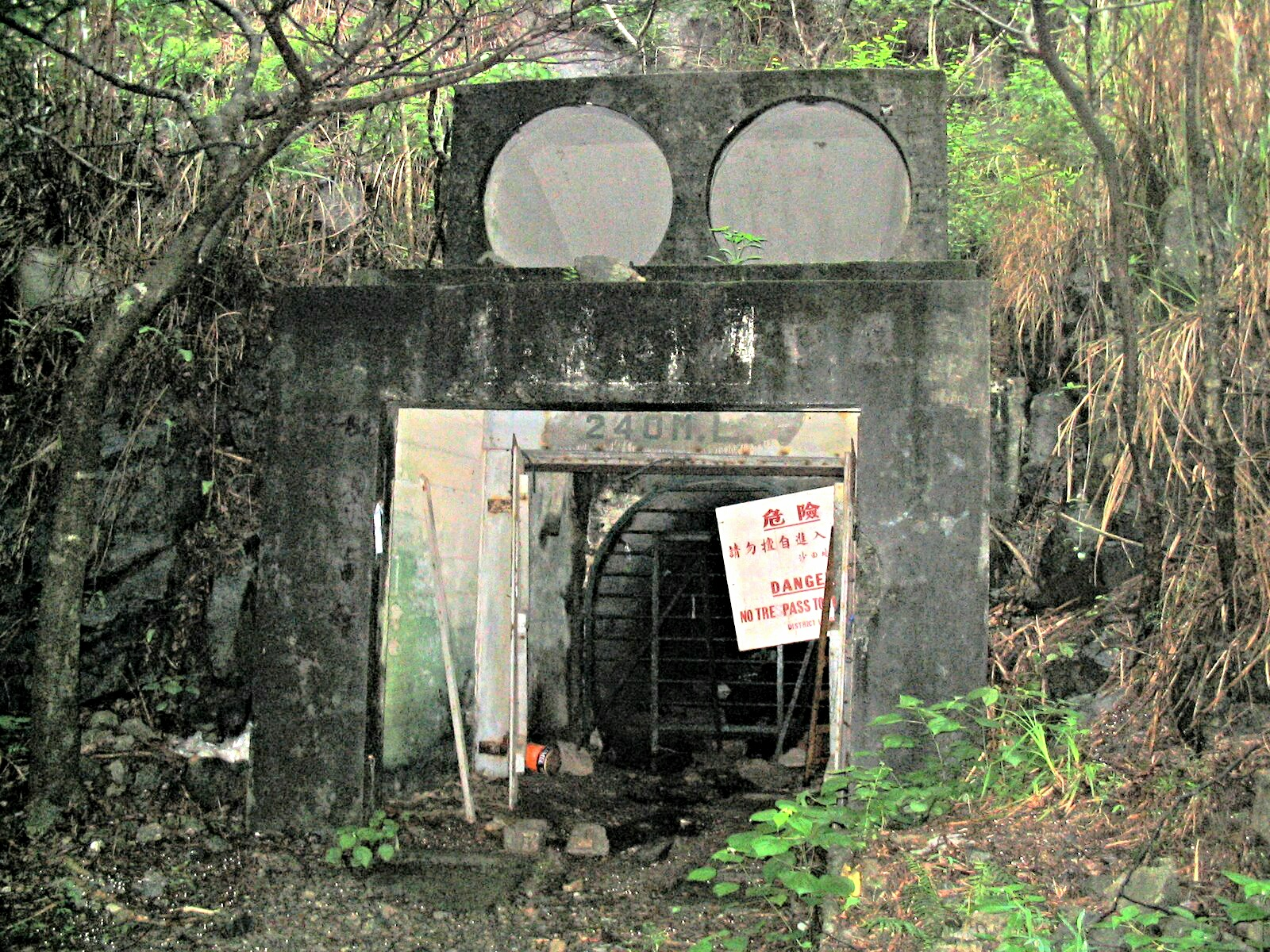
Exterior walls of 240 ML of Ma On Shan Iron Mine.

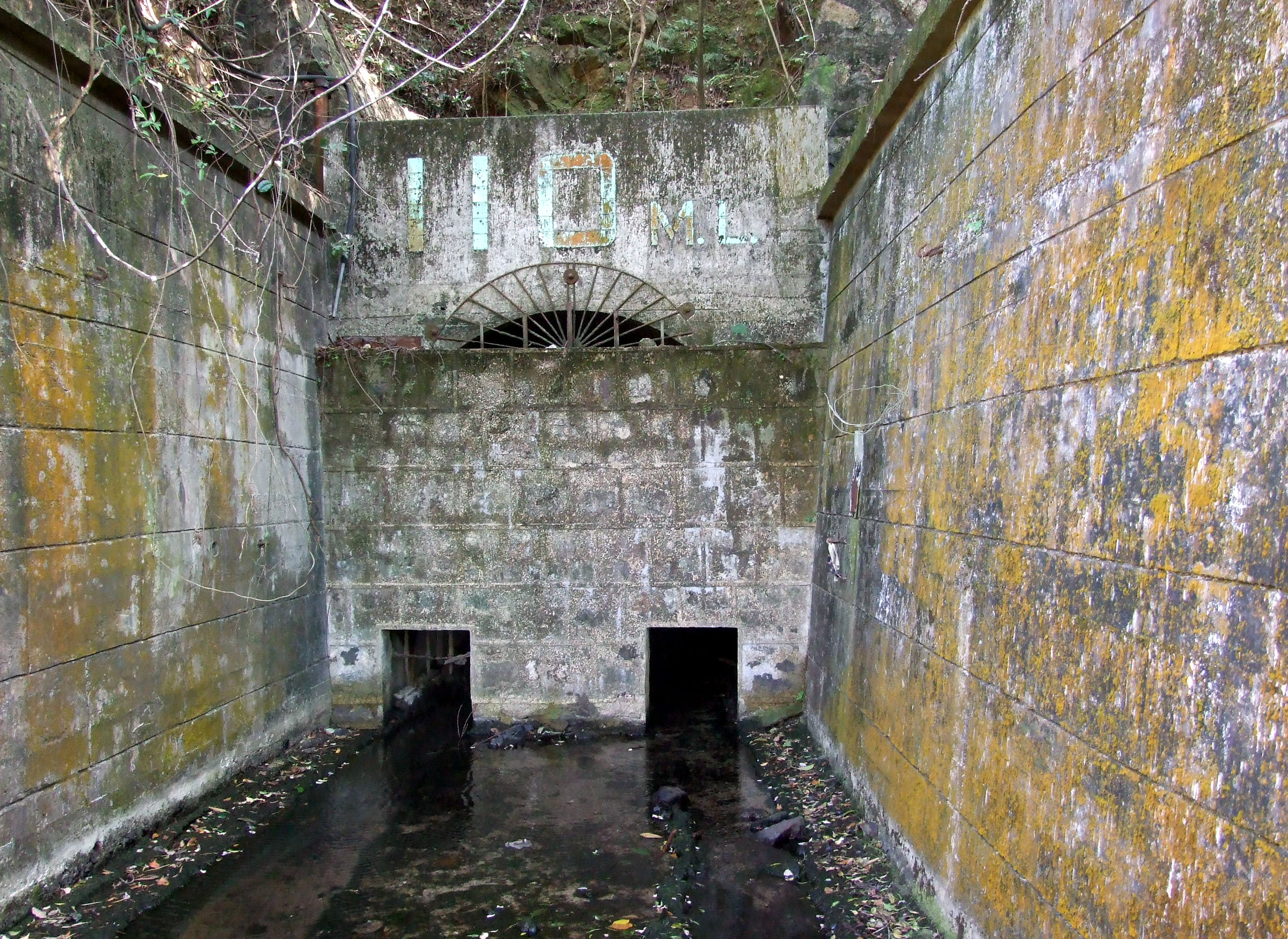
Exterior walls of 110 ML of Ma On Shan Iron Mine.

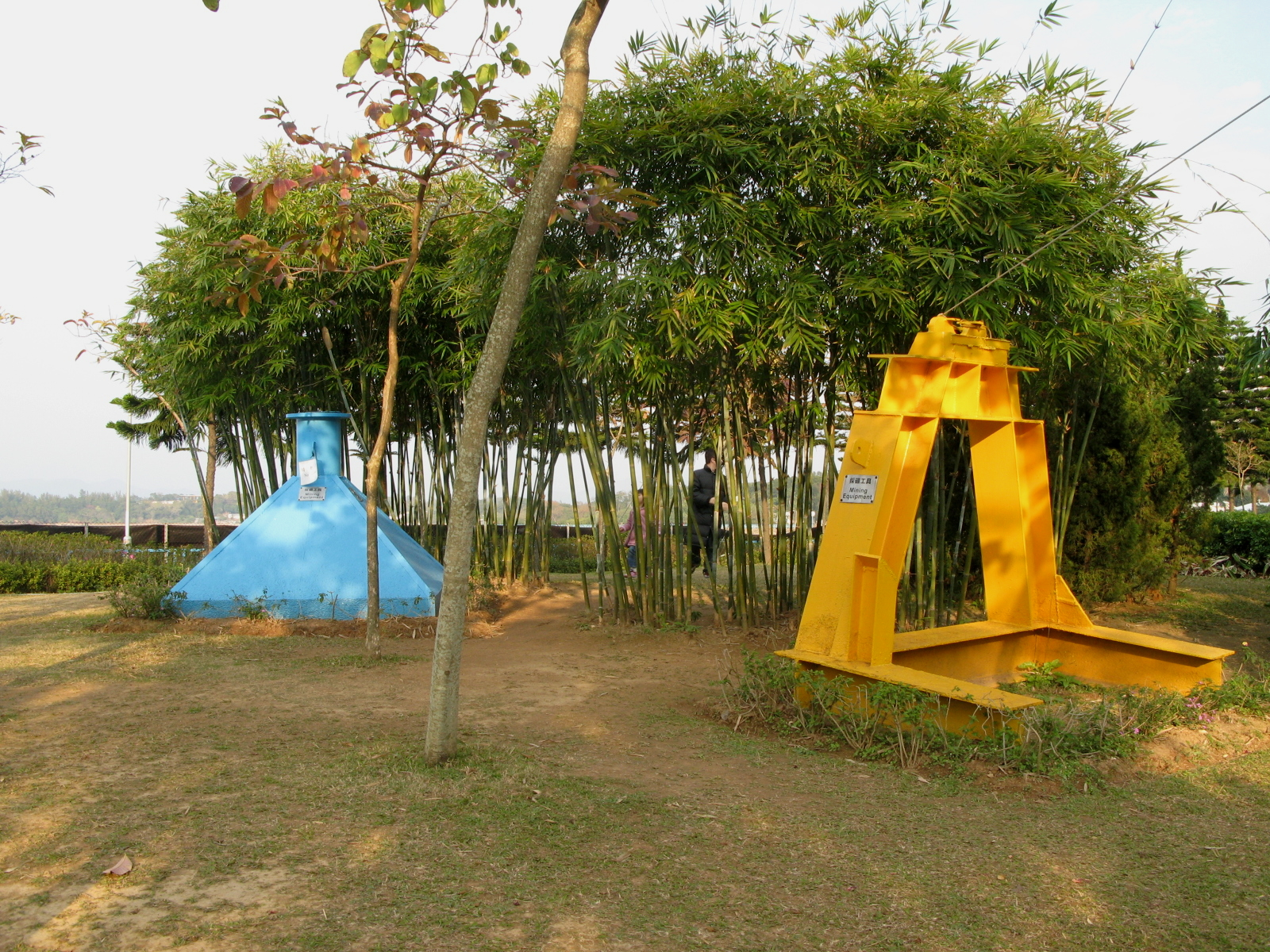
Mining equipment displayed in Ma On Shan Park, in Ma On Shan new town.

The Ma On Shan Iron Mine (Chinese: 馬鞍山鐵礦) is a mine in the hills of Ma On Shan, Sha Tin District, Hong Kong, that was operated from 1906 to 1976. The nearby Ma On Shan Village accommodated the miners and their families.

== History ==
The Ma On Shan Iron Mine opened in 1906 as an opencast site run by the Hong Kong Iron Mining Co. Ltd., which was owned by Sir Paul Chater. In 1949, the mine was taken over by the Mutual Mining and Trade Company, which extended it underground in 1953. By 1959, mining had moved entirely underground. The mine ceased operation in 1976. The workforce of 400 was laid off. The government mining lease ended in 1981 and the mine closed subsequently.

=== Mine operators ===
Historical operators of the mine:

- 1906-1929: The Hong Kong Iron Mining Co. Ltd. (香港鐵礦公司)
- 1931-1940: New Territories Iron Company
- 1940-1941: South China Iron Smelters Co. Ltd (華南製鐵有限公司)
- 1942-1945: (Japanese occupation of Hong Kong)
- 1945-1948: Possibly small scale excavation by South China Iron Smelters Co. Ltd
- 1949-1976: Mutual Trust Co. Ltd (大公洋行)
- 1953-1976: Joint venture between Mutual Trust Co. Ltd and Nittetsu Mining Company (Japan) (日本鐵礦業株式會社)

== Present and future ==
It has been suggested that the Ma On Shan Iron Mine could be repurposed as a storage location for compressed-air energy storage (CAES).

Several sets of structures of the Ma On Shan Iron Mine were listed as historic monuments in April 2016: Exterior walls of 240 ML and 110 ML of Ma On Shan Iron Mine (Grade 2), Mineral Preparation Plant of Ma On Shan Iron Mine (Grade 3), Site Structures at Mining Settlement of Ma On Shan Iron Mine (Grade 3).

== See also ==
- Mining in Hong Kong
- Geology of Hong Kong
- Ma On Shan (peak)
- Ma On Shan Country Park, surrounding the mine area
