= The Hunch Backs =

Mountain in Hong Kong

- 牛押山
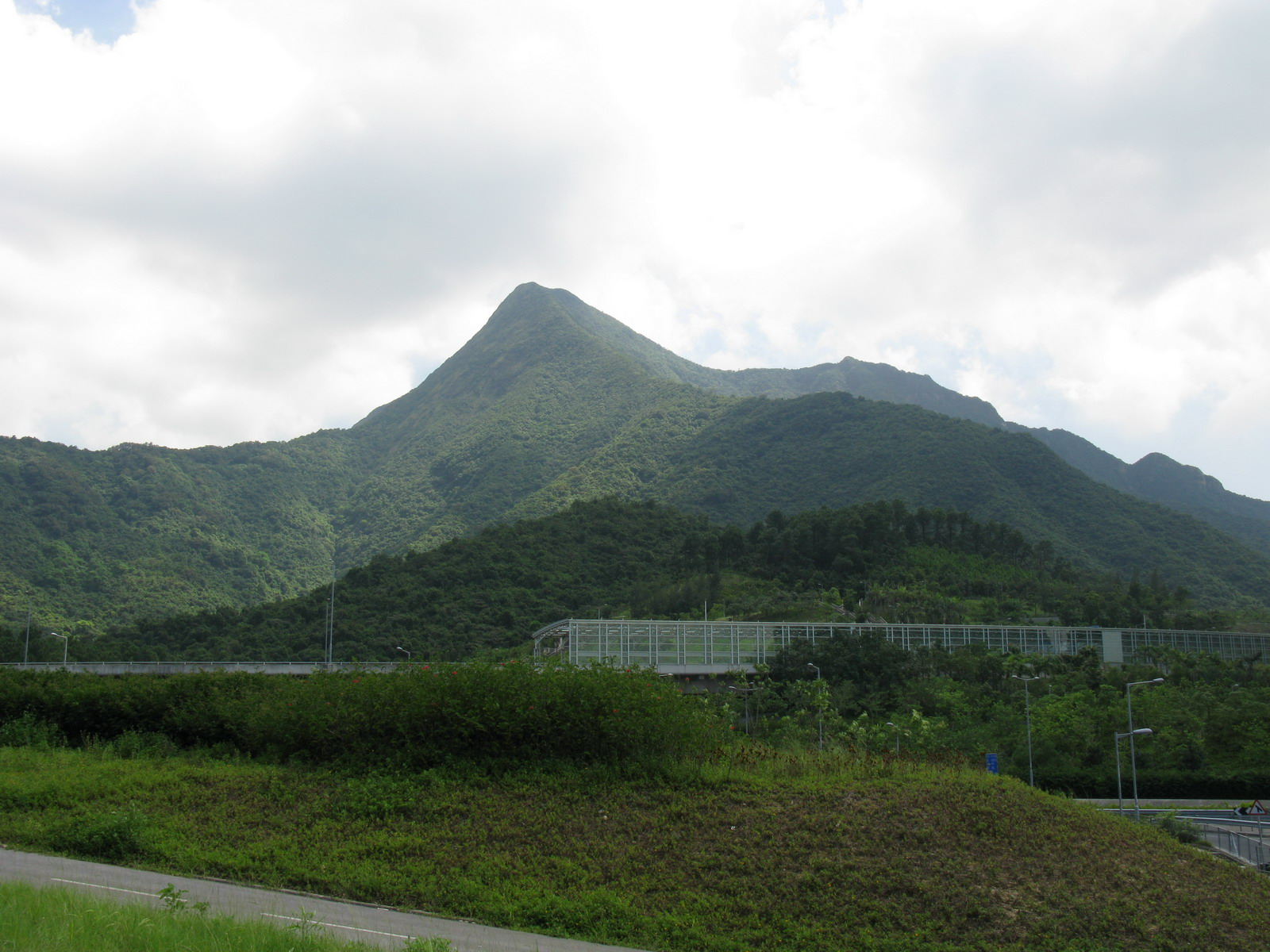
- View of the Hunch Backs

Highest point
- Elevation: 677 m (2,221 ft)
- Coordinates: 22°24′54″N 114°14′53″E

Geography
- Location within Hong Kong

The Hunch Backs, or Ngau Ngak Shan (Chinese: 牛押山), is the twelfth-highest mountain in Hong Kong. Peaked at 677 metres (2,221 ft), it is at the north of Ma On Shan.

== Conservation ==
The north and north-east slopes of the Hunch Backs and the east slope of Ma On Shan, covering an area of 118 hectares, was designated as a Site of Special Scientific Interest in 1976.

== See also ==
- List of mountains, peaks and hills in Hong Kong
- Ma On Shan (peak)
- Ma On Shan Country Park
