= Ma On Shan Village =

Village of Hong Kong

Coordinates: 22°24′07″N 114°14′37″E

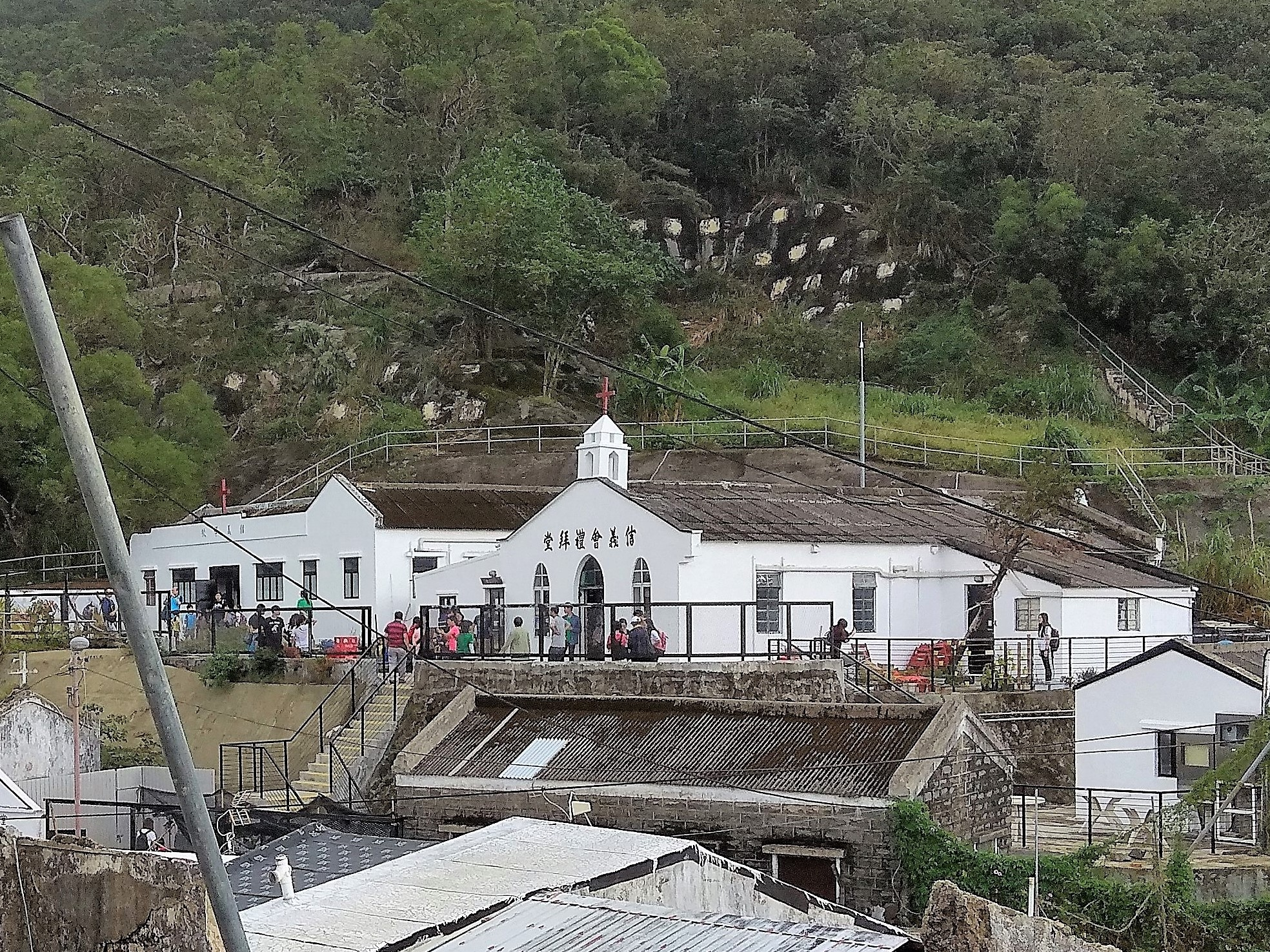
Lutheran Yan Kwong Church

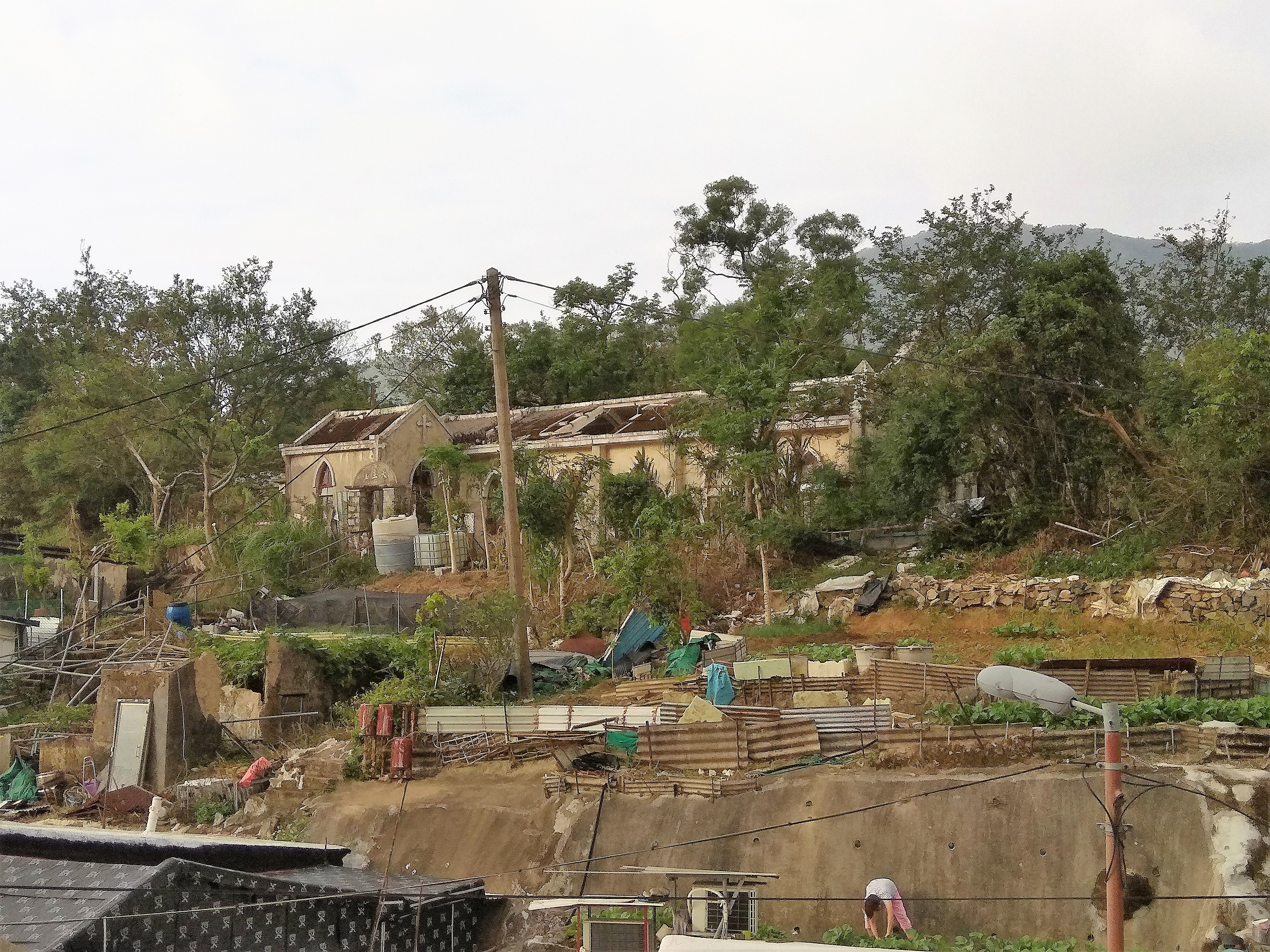
St. Joseph's Church

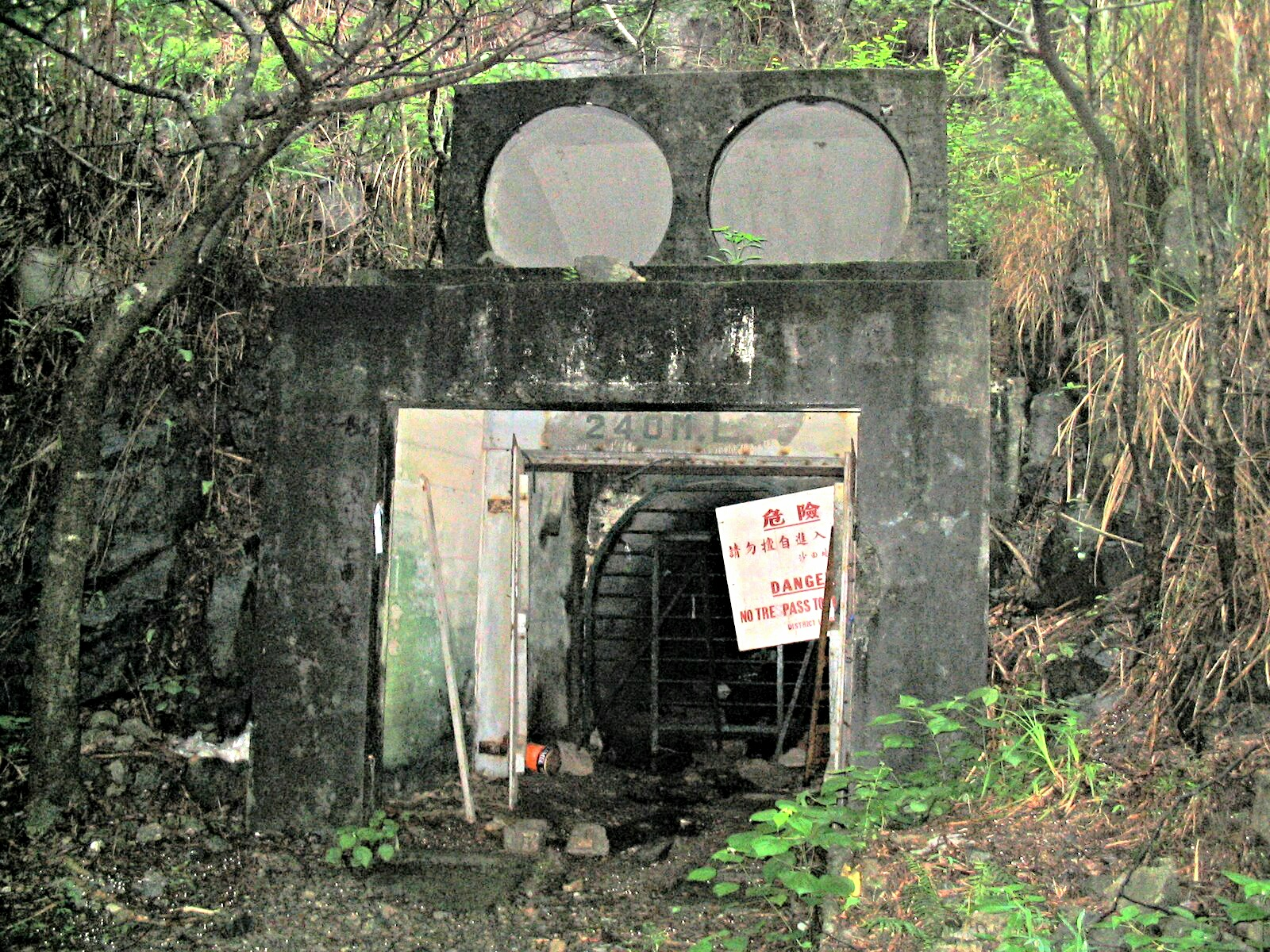
Exterior walls of 240 ML of Ma On Shan Iron Mine.

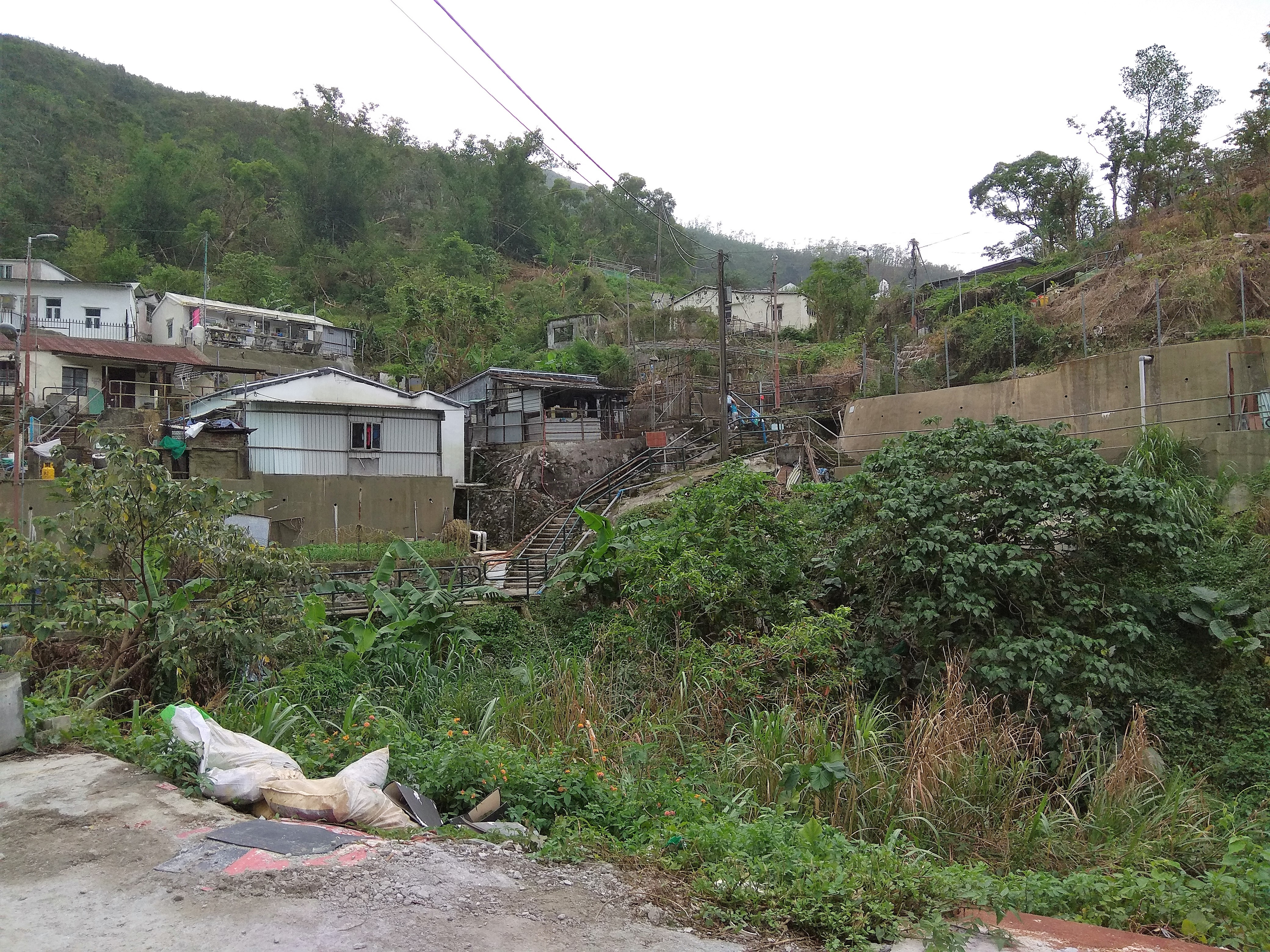
Ma On Shan Upper Village in 2018.

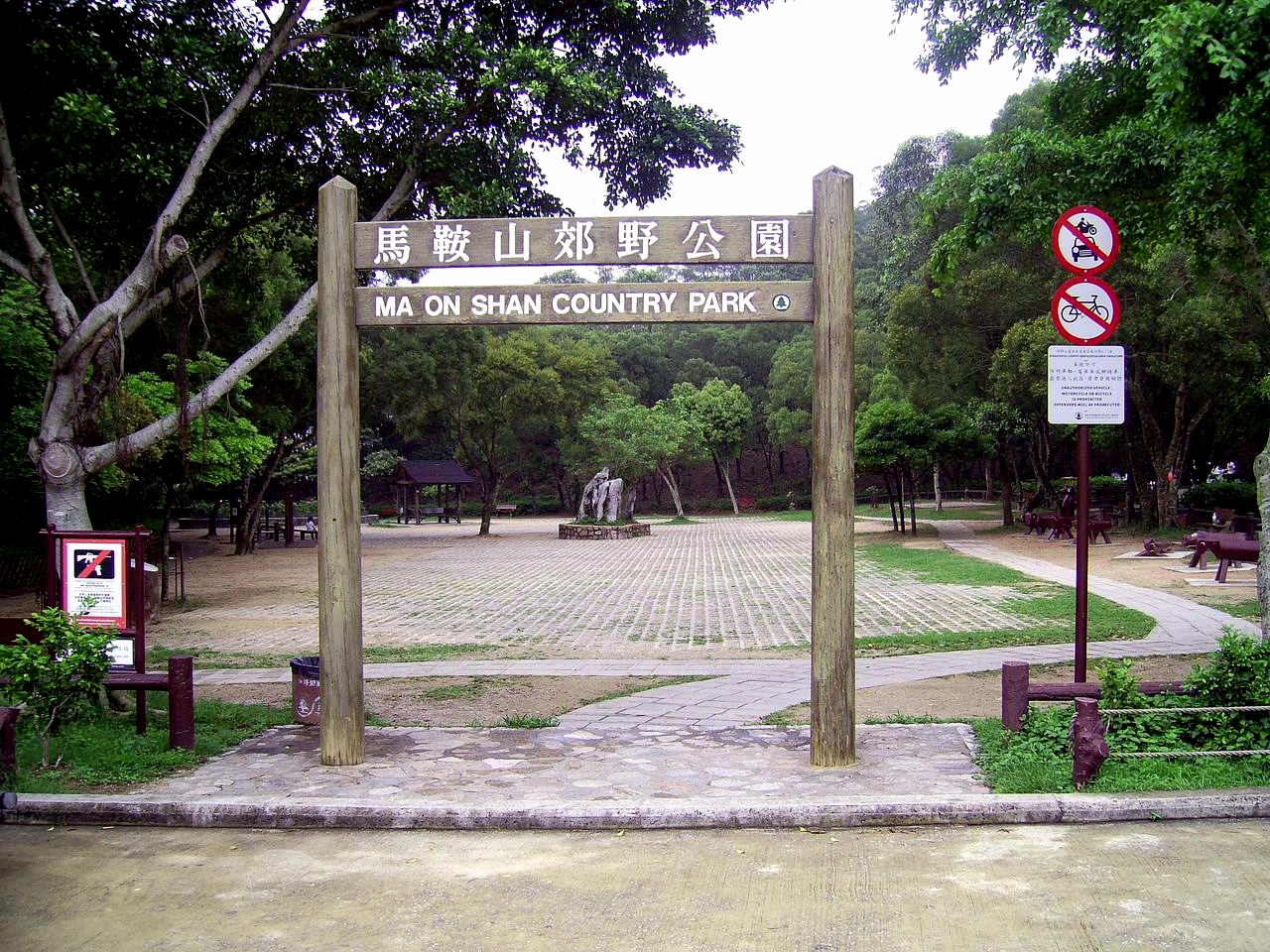
Ma On Shan Country Park gate near Ma On Shan Tsuen Road.

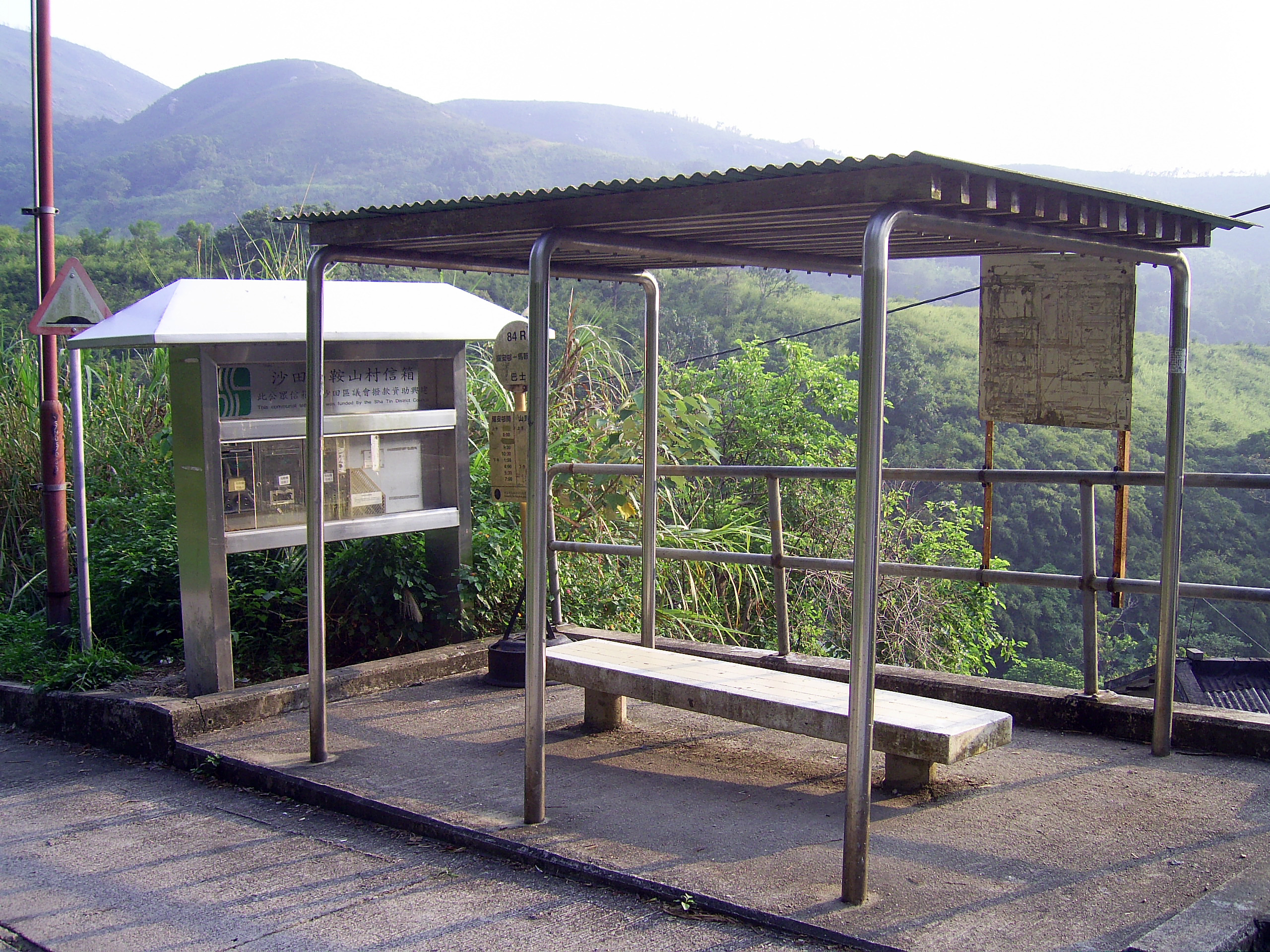
Bus stop at Ma On Shan Lower Village, along Ma On Shan Tsuen Road.

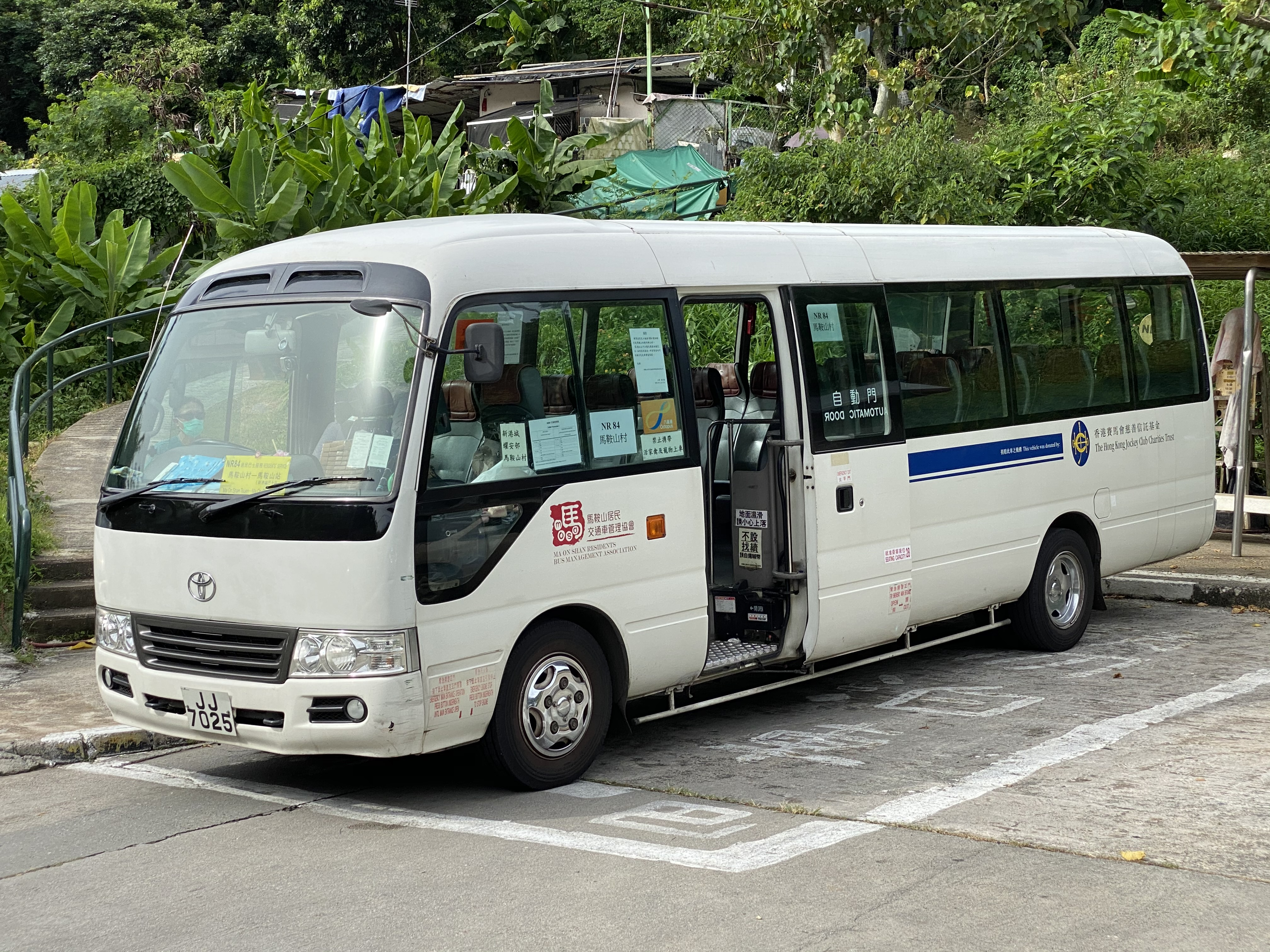
Bus NR84 at Ma On Shan Tsuen.

Ma On Shan Village or Ma On Shan Tsuen (Chinese: 馬鞍山村) is a mining village in the hills of Ma On Shan, Sha Tin District, Hong Kong. The village grew around the activity of the Ma On Shan Iron Mine, which reached its peak during the 1950s and 1960s and ceased operation in 1976. It had historically two churches, St. Joseph's Church and Lutheran Yan Kwong Church.

== Administration ==
Ma On Shan Tsuen is a recognized village under the New Territories Small House Policy.

== Demographics ==
At its peak, after a rapid growth in the 1950s, the village had more than 10,000 inhabitants. The small village saw a large number of new arrivals after changes in the methods of iron ore mining were implemented in 1953. Nearly all of the new arrivals were refugees from Mainland China, who worked as miners and came to live in the area with their families. The exploitation of the mine ended in 1976 and the miners subsequently left the village with their families, leading to a decline of the population. As of 2014, the village was home to 80 people (another source mentions 80 families as of 2015).

== History ==
=== Ma On Shan Iron Mine ===
The Ma On Shan Iron Mine opened in 1906 as an opencast site run by the Hong Kong Iron Mining Company. In 1949, the mine was taken over by the Mutual Mining and Trade Company, which extended it underground in 1953. By 1959, mining had moved entirely underground. The mine ceased operation in 1976. The workforce of 400 was laid off. The government mining lease ended in 1981 and the mine closed subsequently.

=== Lutheran Yan Kwong Church ===
The Lutheran Yan Kwong Church (信義會恩光堂) was inaugurated on 22 June 1952. It was part of a five-building complex that included a church, a primary school (built in 1961), a kindergarten, quarters, and a store.

The primary school and the kindergarten closed in 1976. Lutheran Primary School (信義恩光小學) was subsequently relocated to Heng On Estate in Ma On Shan and was renamed Ma On Shan Lutheran Primary School (馬鞍山信義學校) in 1987. The church complex was then converted into a camp site, the Grace Youth Camp (恩青營). In 2003, landslides caused by heavy rainstorms damaged the complex and made it unsafe. It was abandoned the same year.

The church building was revitalised after 2014 and reopened in 2015 as a community hall and a centre to highlight the history and culture of the old village. The former primary school building was converted into a hostel for church members and the former teachers' quarters was converted into an activity room.

=== St. Joseph's Church ===
The Roman Catholic St. Joseph's Church (聖若瑟堂) was inaugurated on 25 April 1952. It was part of a Catholic building complex established on the top of a small hill in the 1950s, that also included the St. Joseph's Primary School (聖若瑟小學校), adjacent to the church, a kindergarten, a small clinic (built from 1952 to 1954) and a convent (修道院). The church was rebuilt in 1962.

The church stopped its regular Sunday services in 1981, with limited missionary service subsequently performed by Father Wu. It was closed in 1999, and the church complex became vacant.

== Present and future ==
The residential part of the village has been described as "only small and short squatter area".

Several sets of structures of Ma On Shan Village were listed as historic monuments in April 2016: Exterior walls of 240 ML and 110 ML of Ma On Shan Iron Mine (Grade 2), Mineral Preparation Plant of Ma On Shan Iron Mine (Grade 3), Site Structures at Mining Settlement of Ma On Shan Iron Mine (Grade 3), St. Joseph's Church (Grade 2) and Lutheran Yan Kwong Church (Grade 3).

== Access ==
The village is served by the bus route NR84, connecting Ma On Shan Tsuen to Ma On Shan MTR station via Ma On Shan Tsuen Road, Ma On Shan Road, Hang Hong Street, Sai Sha Road and On Luk Street, and operated by Ma On Shan Residents Bus Management Association Ltd.

The Ma On Shan Country Trail runs from Ma On Shan Village to Tai Shui Tseng (大水井) via Ngong Ping.

== In popular culture ==
Several scenes of the 2009 film Tactical Unit – Comrades in Arms, directed by Law Wing-cheung, were shot at St. Joseph's Church.

== See also ==
- List of villages in Hong Kong
- Ma On Shan Country Park, surrounding the village
- Ma On Shan (peak)
- Mining in Hong Kong
