= Ma On Shan (peak) =

Peak in Hong Kong

- 馬鞍山
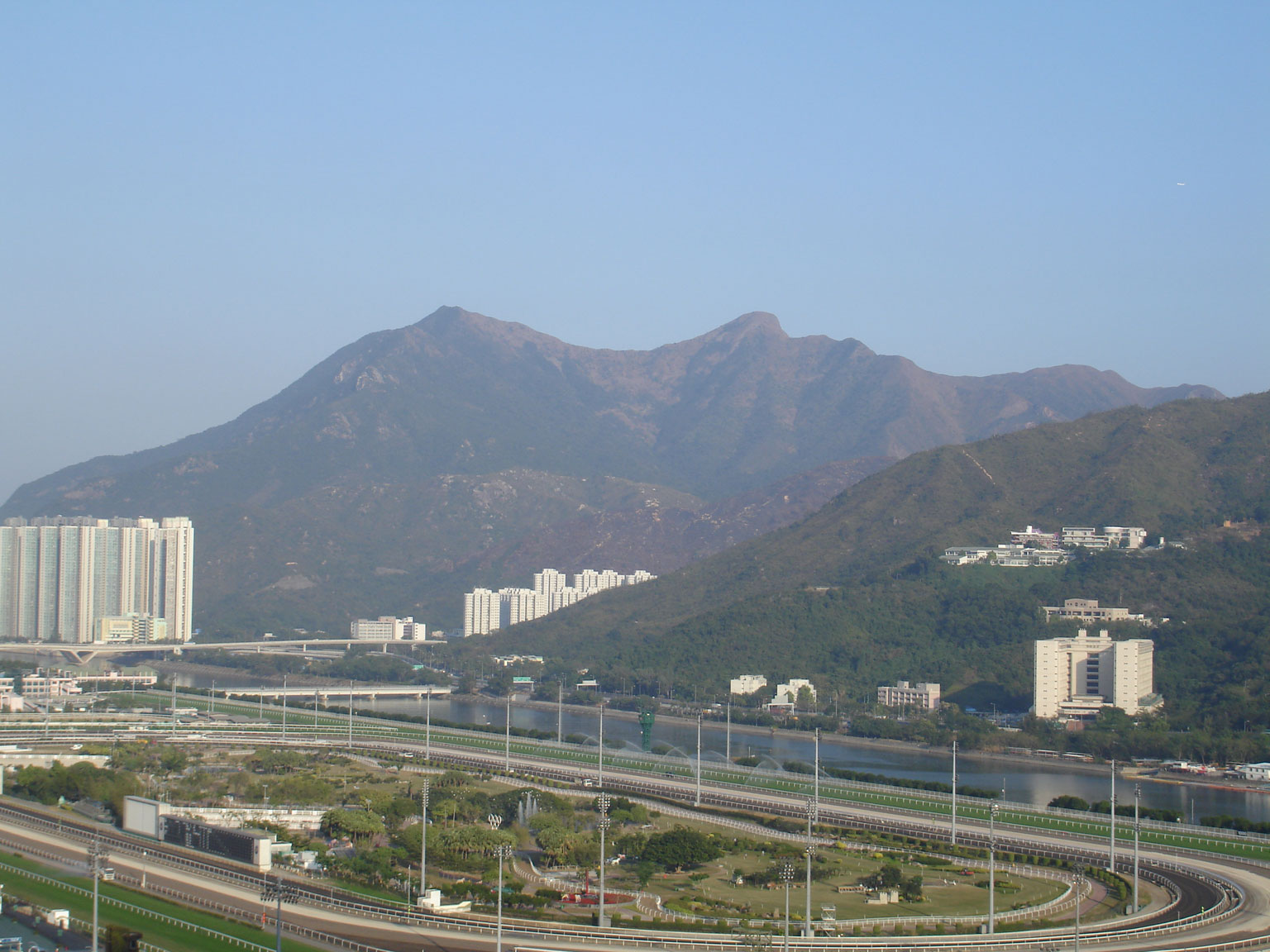
- View of Ma On Shan from Sha Tin Racecourse

Highest point
- Elevation: 702 m (2,303 ft); HKPD
- Coordinates: 22°24′32″N 114°15′6″E

Geography
- Location within Hong Kong
- Location: Hong Kong

Ma On Shan (Chinese: 馬鞍山; lit. 'Horse Saddle Peak') is a saddle-shaped peak in east of Tolo Harbour in the New Territories of Hong Kong. With a height of 702 metres (2,303 ft), it stands among the ten highest mountains in Hong Kong. The mountain borders Sha Tin and Tai Po districts.

Beneath the west face of the mountain along Tolo Harbour, the Ma On Shan new town extension, administratively part of Sha Tin, is named after the hill. It ends north in Wu Kai Sha.

== Geography ==
Ma On Shan can be distinguished by the west face which looks like a saddle, and "Ma On Shan" can be translated as "horse saddle mountain". Nine streams flow down from Ma On Shan, with the biggest located on the southwest slope of Ma On Shan, near Ma On Shan Village.

A group of villages located east of the peak is named Shap Sze Heung and the harbour of Three Fathoms Cove.

== Geology ==
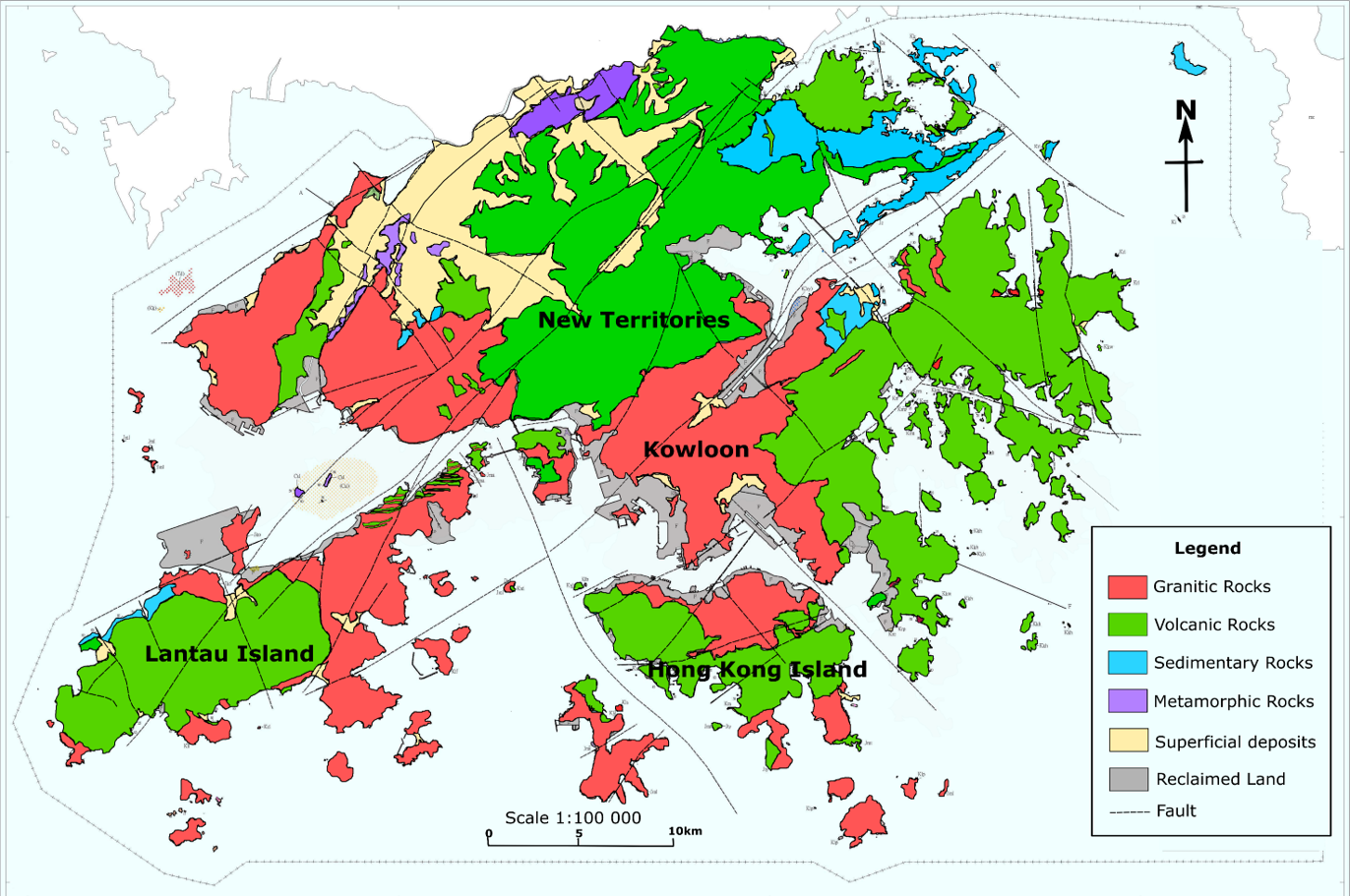
Geological map of Hong Kong showing the distribution of faults and different rock types in Hong Kong. Ma On Shan is in the Green and Blue area (Volcanic Rock + Sedimentary Rock) in Eastern New Territories.

Ma On Shan
- Traditional Chinese: 馬鞍山
- Simplified Chinese: 马鞍山
- Literal meaning: Horse Saddle Peak
Transcriptions
Standard Mandarin
- Hanyu Pinyin: Mǎ'ānshān; Mǎ'ān Shān
Hakka
- Romanization: Ma5 On1 San1
Yue: Cantonese
- Yale Romanization: máh ōn sāan
- Jyutping: Maa5 On1 Saan1

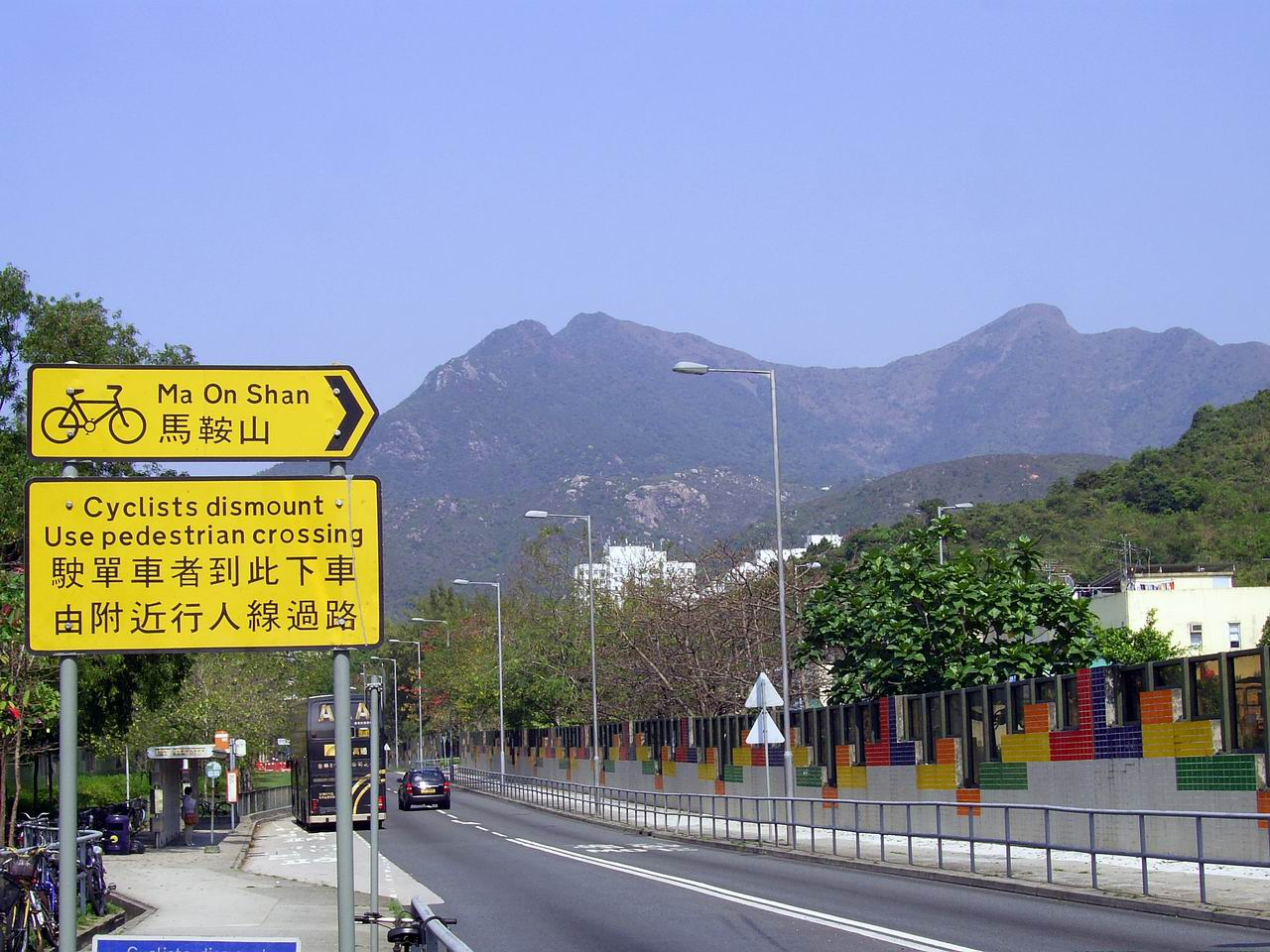
Ma On Shan.

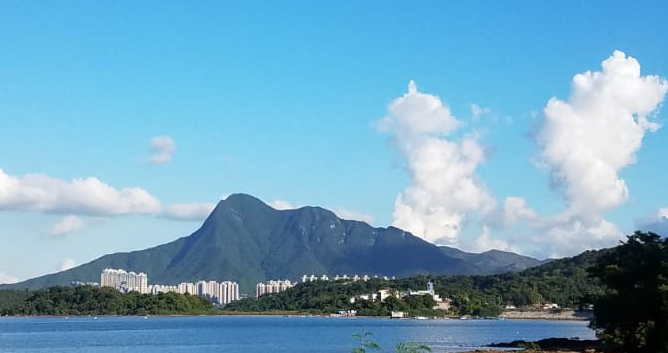
Ma On Shan across Tolo Harbour.

The saddle-like peaks of Ma On Shan is formed by volcanic rocks, much like many of the tallest mountains in Hong Kong, such as Tai Mo Shan. The base of the mountain is mostly formed by sedimentary rocks around 120 - 60 million years ago. The southeastern part of the mountain consists of intruded rhyolite. Some shorter mountains in Hong Kong are formed by older Granitic rocks.

== Formation ==
The saddle shape of Ma On Shan was formed over the past 200 million years. Originally, Ma On Shan was a surface of sedimentary rocks covered by volcanic rocks (mainly tuffs) from volcanic eruptions (about 160 mya). The sedimentary and volcanic rocks were then folded into ridges (about 120 mya). Rhyolite rocks intruded the ridge later (about 100 mya). The faulting in the ridges then lead to a more saddle-like shape (about 60 mya). The weathering process made the ridges and peaks smooth (about 60 mya - now).

== Vegetation ==
The north slope of Ma On Shan is mostly tree-covered, while the south slope is mainly shrubs and grasses. On these hostile volcanic hills, only hardy and highly adaptable plants survive. There are some rare flora species, including Rhododendron simsii, which blooms with red flowers in late March, and two other species of native Rhododendron. Rare and protected species of plants also grow on Ma On Shan including the Chinese Lily (Lilium brownii) which is found on the mountain's eastern slope.

A few types of wild orchid grow in the streams of Ma On Shan, including Hong Kong's most common orchid, the Bamboo Orchid, so called because its distinctive stem resembles bamboo.

== Wildlife ==
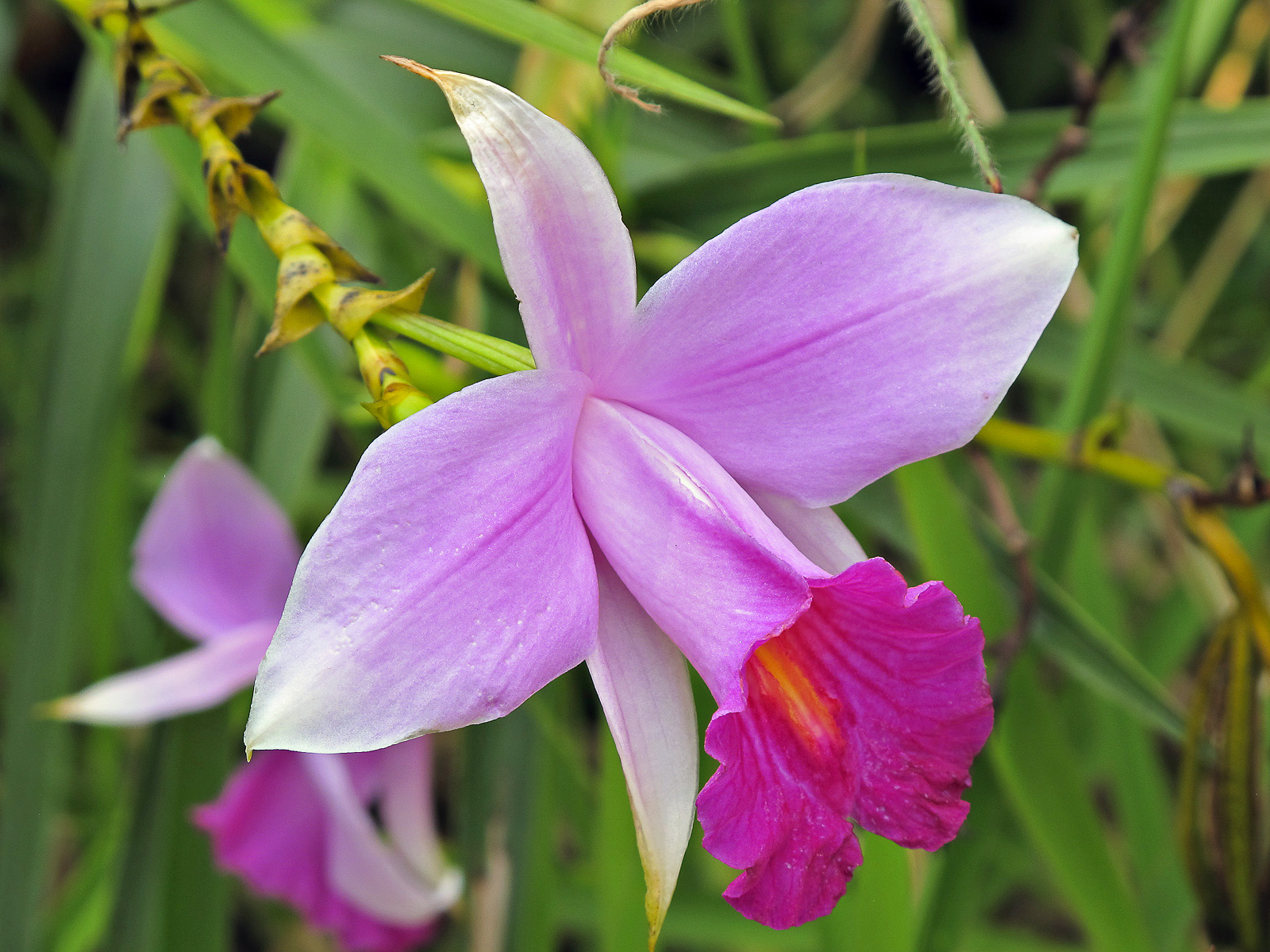
Bamboo Orchid flower

The natural environment of Ma On Shan is relatively undisturbed, so this valuable sanctuary gives shelter to many wildlife species. Common mammals are Chinese pangolin (Manis pentadactyla), Chinese porcupine (Hystrix brachyura), wild boar (Sus scrofa) and common muntjac (Muntiacus muntjac).

== Conservation ==
The north and north-east slopes of The Hunch Backs and the east slope of Ma On Shan, covering an area of 118 hectares, was designated as a Site of Special Scientific Interest in 1976.

== History ==
=== Human life on Ma On Shan ===
In the 1850s, the Wans, a Hakka family, established the Ma On Shan Village. They lived traditional lives of farming. Once iron mining became prominent on the mountain in the 1950s, the villagers slowly transitioned to make a living through mining. As farming was no longer necessary in Hong Kong at the time, these villages were abandoned one by one.

=== Iron mining ===
Iron mining on Ma On Shan started in the early 1900s. Its high-purity (60%) iron ore attracted many newcomers to live near Ma On Shan in the late 1940s. The number of these mining newcomers exceeded 5,000 in the 1950s, with annual output in the 1950s and 1960s exceeding 100,000 tonnes. During this peak in the mining of iron, most of the miners lived in Ma On Shan New Village. An extensive network of tunnels was built under the hill.

However, in the 1970s, Japan’s demand for iron was reduced massively due to them building oil tankers. Therefore, the mining operations in Ma On Shan became unprofitable and uncompetitive. The iron mines were abandoned in 1976. Until 2006, there are still 30,000 tonnes of iron ore in Ma On Shan.

== See also ==
- List of mountains, peaks and hills in Hong Kong
- Ma On Shan (town) - new town development to the northern side of the peak
- The Hunch Backs
- List of storms named Ma-on
