= Tang Chau =

Island in Hong Kong

Coordinates: 22.44658°N 114.25781°E

- Chinese: 燈洲
Transcriptions
Standard Mandarin
- Hanyu Pinyin: Dēng Zhōu
Yue: Cantonese
- Jyutping: dang1 zau1

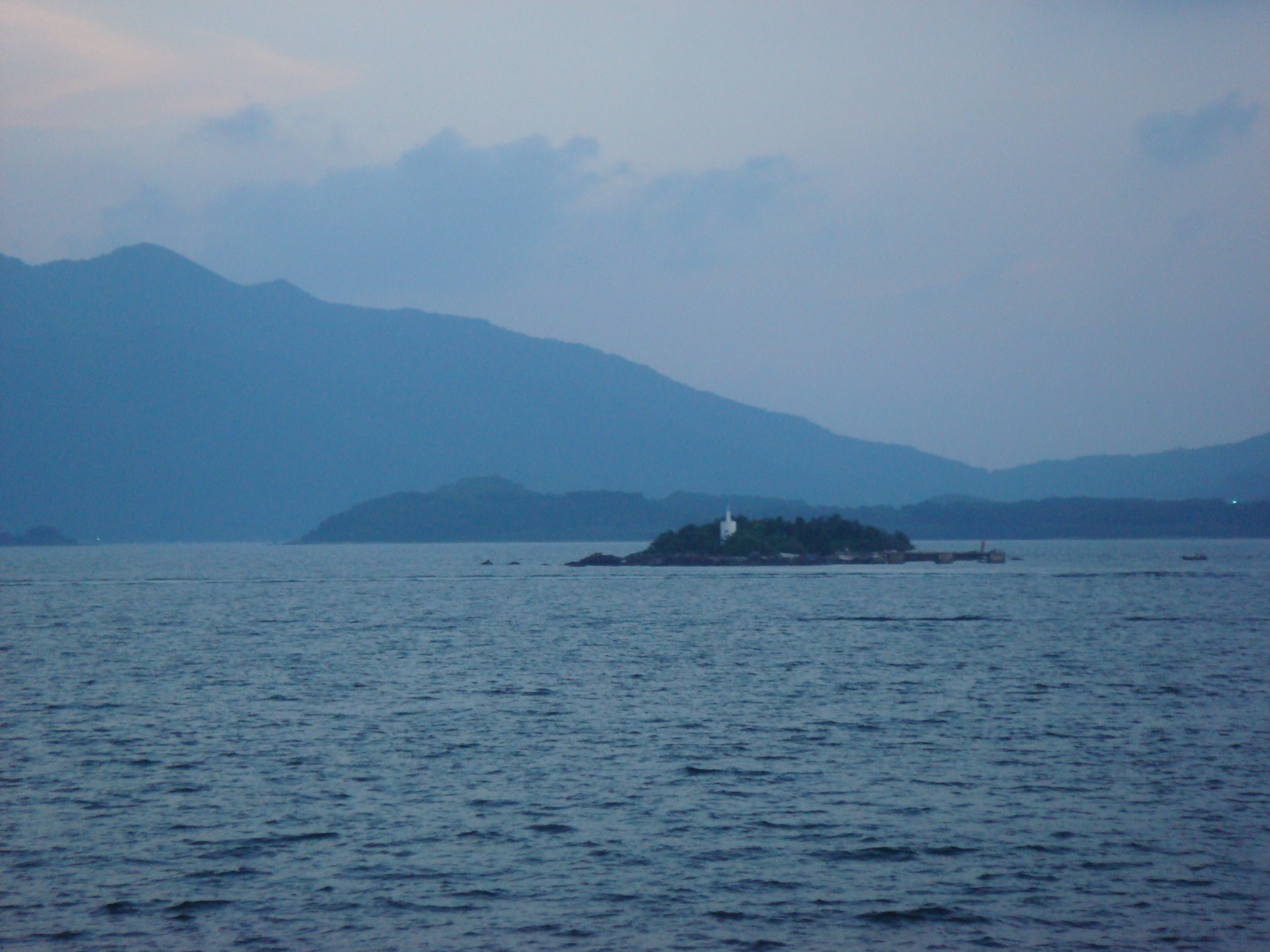
Tang Chau

Tang Chau (Chinese: 燈洲) is a small uninhabited island of Hong Kong located in Tolo Harbour, east of Centre Island between Nai Chung and Pak Sha Tau, in the northwestern part of the territory. Administratively, it is part of Tai Po District.

The island is a spot for water sports such as Kayaking.

== Geography ==
Tang Chau is a small island. It is lightly forested has a partially rugged coastline with sections with sandy beaches.
