= Pak Sha Tau =

Island in Hong Kong

Coordinates: 22.455570504840555°N 114.25288089296592°E

- Chinese: 白沙頭
Transcriptions
Standard Mandarin
- Hanyu Pinyin: Bái Shā Tóu
Yue: Cantonese
- Jyutping: baak6 saa1 tau4

Pak Sha Tau (Chinese: 白沙頭) or Pak Sha Tau Chau (Chinese: 白沙頭洲) , formerly also known as Harbour island. Is a former island of Hong Kong located in Tolo Harbour, on the southern end of Plover Cove Reservoir, connected to Tai Mei Tuk through the main dam of the reservoir and Tung Tau Chau through the sub dam of the reservoir.

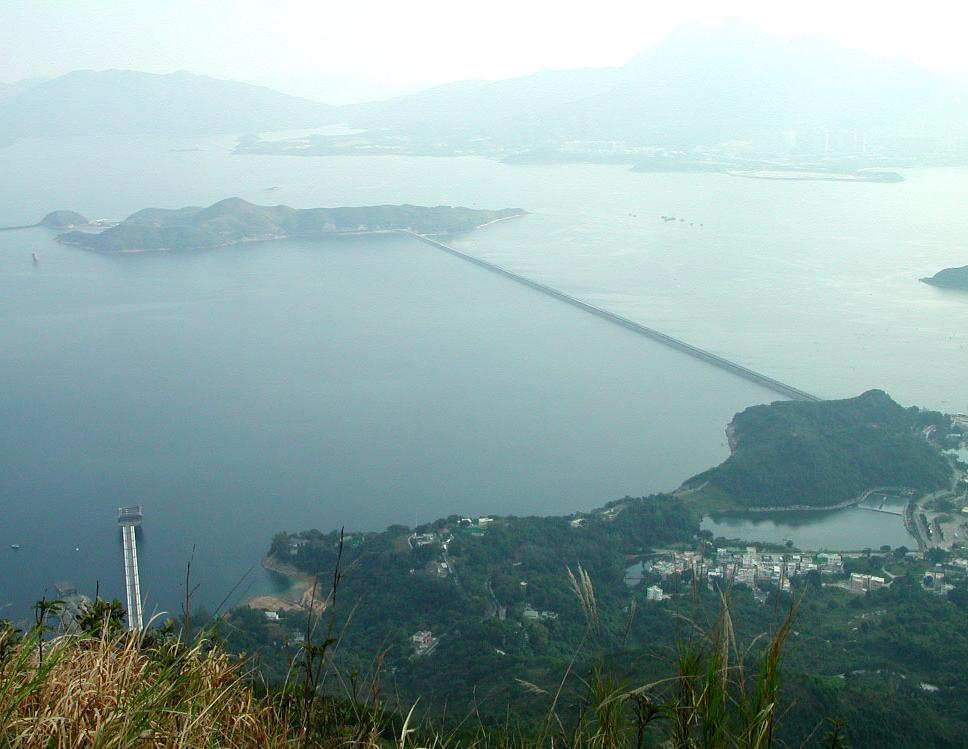
Pak Sha Tau viewed from Pat Sin Leng

== Geography ==
Pak Sha Tau is located in the northwestern part of Hong Kong. Administratively, it is part of Tai Po District. Before it was connected to the mainland it was approximately 0.2 square mile in size.

== History ==
Pak Sha Tau was originally an island. When construction of the Plover Cove Reservoir began in 1960, dams were constructed connecting Tai Mei Tuk, Pak Sha Tau and Cheung Pai Tun. The village of Sam Mun Tsai used to be on the eastern shore of the island before it was moved to Yim Tin Tsai in 1965.
