= Geology of Hong Kong =

The geology of Hong Kong is dominated by igneous rocks (including granitic rocks and volcanic rocks) formed during a major volcanic eruption period in the Mesozoic era. It makes up 85% of Hong Kong's land surface, and the remaining 15% are mostly sedimentary rocks located in the northeastern New Territories. There is also a very small percentage (<1%) of metamorphic rocks within the New Territories, formed by deformation of pre-existing sedimentary rocks (metamorphism).

The geological history of Hong Kong started as early as the Devonian period (~420 Mya) which is marked by the discovery of fragmentary placoderm (a Devonian fish) fossils in northeast Hong Kong. While the youngest rocks in Hong Kong were formed during the Paleogene period(~50 Mya). They are today exposed in Tung Ping Chau in northeastern Hong Kong.

Each of the three types of rocks— igneous, sedimentary, and metamorphic— form spectacular geological features in Hong Kong. Igneous rock forms the hexagonal columns in Sai Kung, sedimentary rock forms various erosional landforms such as wave-cut platforms and sea stacks in Tung Ping Chau, and metamorphic rock forms the iron ore deposits in Ma On Shan.

In terms of structural geology, faults in Hong Kong mainly run from the northeast to the southwest. Deformation features such as sheared rocks, folds, and faulted rocks can be found near major faults, such as the banks of the Tolo Channel. Past fault activity can be observed in some structures such as the Lantau dyke swarm, deformed caldera, etc.

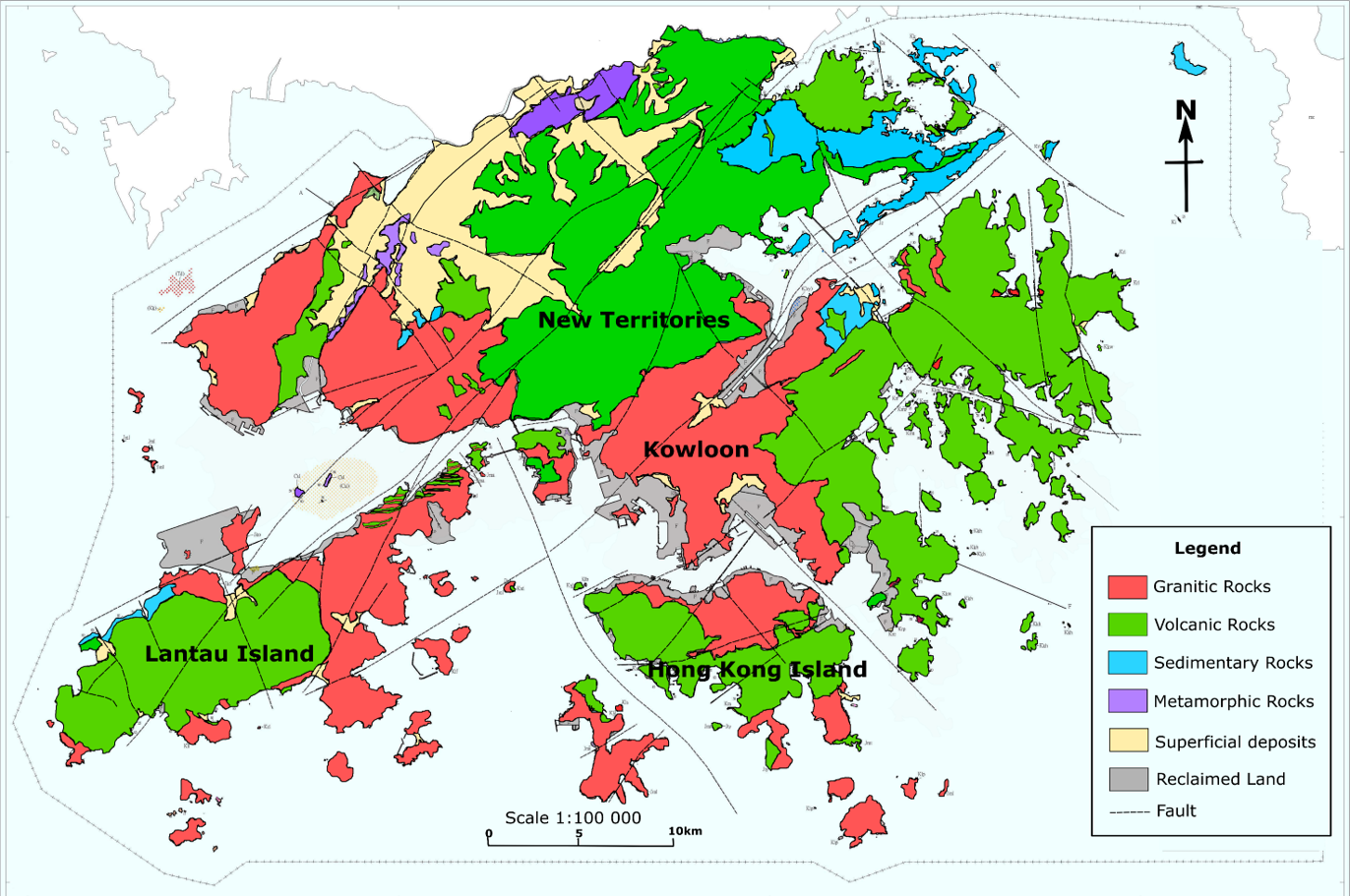
[Fig.1] Geological map of Hong Kong showing the distribution of faults and different rock types in Hong Kong. Modified from Civil Engineering Development Department, HKSAR.

== Geological Evolution ==
The geological history of Hong Kong is mainly divided into three periods. From the Devonian to the early Jurassic is the pre-volcanic sedimentary period, where the environment of Hong Kong alternated between a river plain and a shallow sea setting; rocks of this period are characterised by a variety of different fossils, heavily folded strata, and steeply tilted beds. Later, from the middle Jurassic to the early Cretaceous period, Hong Kong experienced a volcanic period, marked by the massive coverage of volcanic lava, ash, and granitic rocks. From the middle Cretaceous onward is the post-volcanic sedimentary period, represented by reddish coloured sedimentary rocks, an indication of an arid tropical climate during deposition.

Major rock units in Hong Kong are shown by chronological order in the table below.

Geological Stratigraphy of Hong Kong
| Period | Representative Formations | Dominant rock types | Deposition environment | Notes |
|---|---|---|---|---|
| Devonian (ca. 416 - 359 Mya | Bluff Head formation | Brownish folded sandstone | River channels | the oldest rock in Hong Kong, age determined by Placoderm fossils |
| Carboniferous (ca. 359 - 299 Mya) | Yuen Long formation | white or greyish marble | marine | metamorphosed in Mesozoic volcanic period, formed iron ore in Ma On Shan mine |
| Carboniferous (ca. 359 - 299 Mya) | Lok Ma Chau formation | metasandstones and siltstone graphite beds | deltaic swamps | metamorphosed in Mesozoic volcanic period |
| Permian (ca. 299 - 252 Mya) | Tolo Harbour formation | siltstone, sandstone, conglomerate | tidal shore | oldest ammonoid fossils in Hong Kong |
| Triassic (ca. 252 - 201 Mya) | missing | N/A | N/A | |
| Jurassic (ca. 201 - 145 Mya) | Tolo Channel formation | black mudstone, grey siltstone | shallow marine | |
| Jurassic (ca. 201 - 145 Mya) | Tuen Mun formation | Andesitic lava and crystal tuff breccia | volcanic arc | Volcanic period started here. |
| Jurassic (ca. 201 - 145 Mya) | Tsuen Wan Volcanic Group | coarse ash crystal tuff | back-arc volcano | covered a large area in New Territories |
| Jurassic (ca. 201 - 145 Mya) | Lantau Volcanic Group | rhyolite with larger crystals (porphoritic) | back-arc volcano | related to Lantau caldera and dyke swarm, covered most of Lantau island |
| Cretaceous (ca. 145 - 66 Mya) | Mount Davis formation | coarse ash crystal tuff | back-arc volcano | related to Kowloon granite |
| Cretaceous (ca. 145 - 66 Mya) | High Island formation | fine ash tuff | back-arc volcano | formed hexagonal columnar joint |
| Cretaceous (ca. 145 - 66 Mya) | Kau Sai Chau Volcanic Group | lapilli bearing tuff with rhyolitic bands | back-arc volcano | Volcanic period ended here |
| Cretaceous (ca. 145 - 66 Mya) | Pat Sin Leng formation | reddish conglomerate and ash bearing sandstone | river plain | volcanic ashes mixed with depositions, the red colour showed an arid climate |
| Cretaceous (ca. 145 - 66 Mya) | Port Island formation | reddish conglomerate and sandstone | river plain | |
| Paleogene (ca. 66 - 23 Mya) | Ping Chau formation | calcium carbonate bearing siltstones | lake | Sea stacks and wave-cut platforms are found on Ping Chau formation |

== Igneous Rocks ==
The geology of Hong Kong is dominated by igneous rocks, related to volcanic eruptions. From the Middle Jurassic to the Early Cretaceous, Hong Kong was at the convergent plate boundary where the Paleo-Pacific oceanic plate subducted beneath the Eurasian continental plate. The oceanic plate carried sea water into the hot lower crust, which lowered the melting point of the crust; this partially melted the crust and formed magma, which rose and formed a magma chamber beneath the surface, eventually forming volcanoes at the surface as a result. When these erupted, volcanic ash, pieces of rocks, and some magma was expelled. These materials then eventually cooled down and became volcanic rock. These rocks cooled down quickly once they settled on the surface, meaning that mineral crystals in these rocks are very small.

Volcanic rocks are widely distributed in Hong Kong (green areas in Fig.1), forming the tallest mountains in Hong Kong, such as Tai Mo Shan (957 m, the tallest mountain in Hong Kong) and Lantau Peak (934 m, second tallest). In the eastern part of Hong Kong, these volcanic rocks form hexagonal columnar cooling joints. They can be seen from the High Island reservoir and nearby islands. These areas are listed as part of the UNESCO Global Geopark of Hong Kong.

In the Early Cretaceous period (approximately 140 Mya), volcanic activities ceased. The hot magma in the magma chamber eventually cooled down and became granitic rocks. These magma cooled slowly below the ground surface. Mineral crystals are therefore large enough to be seen.

Granitic rocks cover about 35% of Hong Kong's land surface (red area in fig.1). They are mainly distributed in Kowloon, northern Hong Kong Island, eastern Lantau, and Tuen Mun. Granitic rocks form the Victoria Harbour from which Hong Kong derives its name as the "fragrant harbour".

=== Sai Kung Hexagonal Columnar Cooling Joints ===
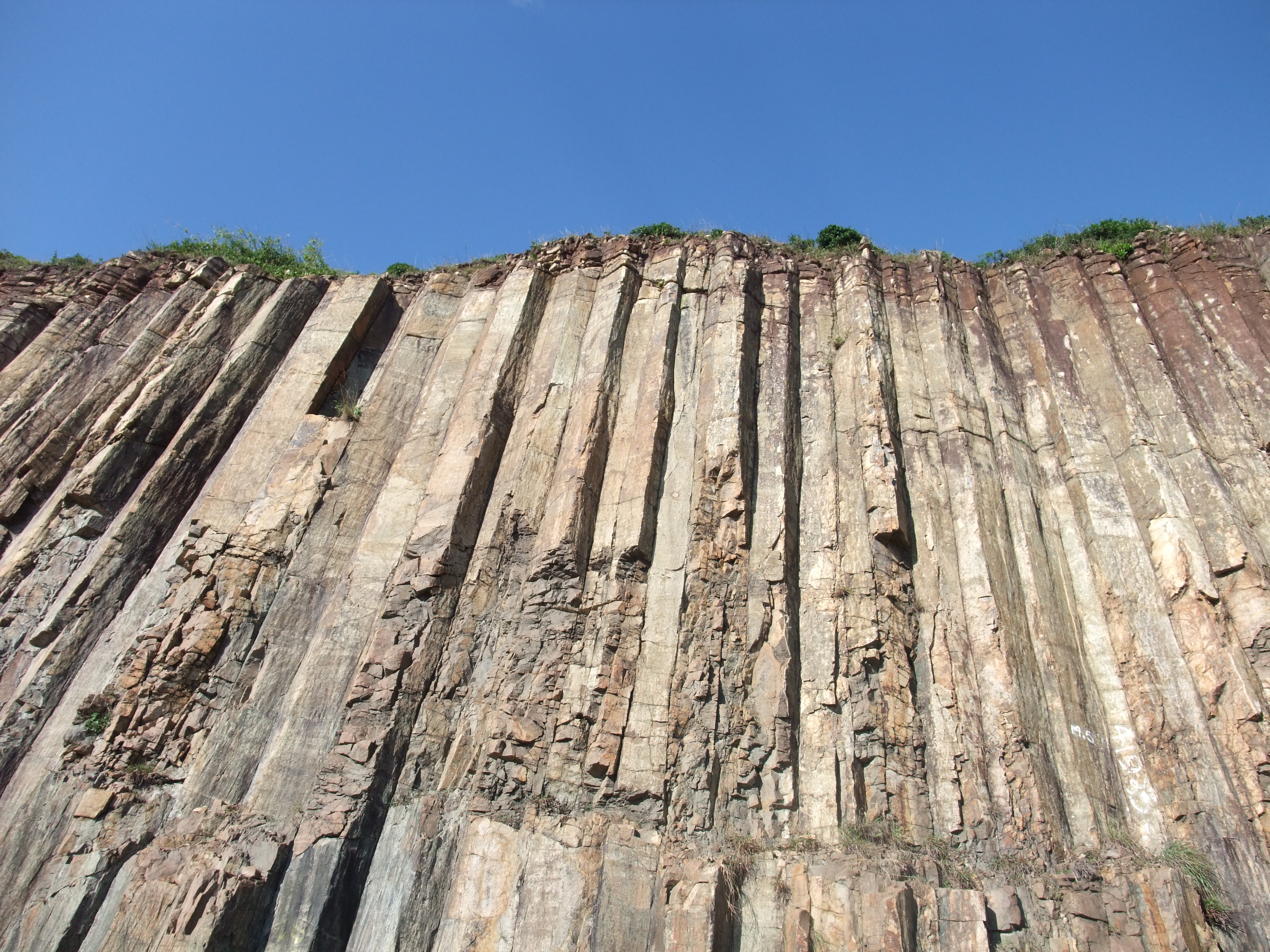
Hexagonal columnar cooling joints at East Dam of High Island Reservoir

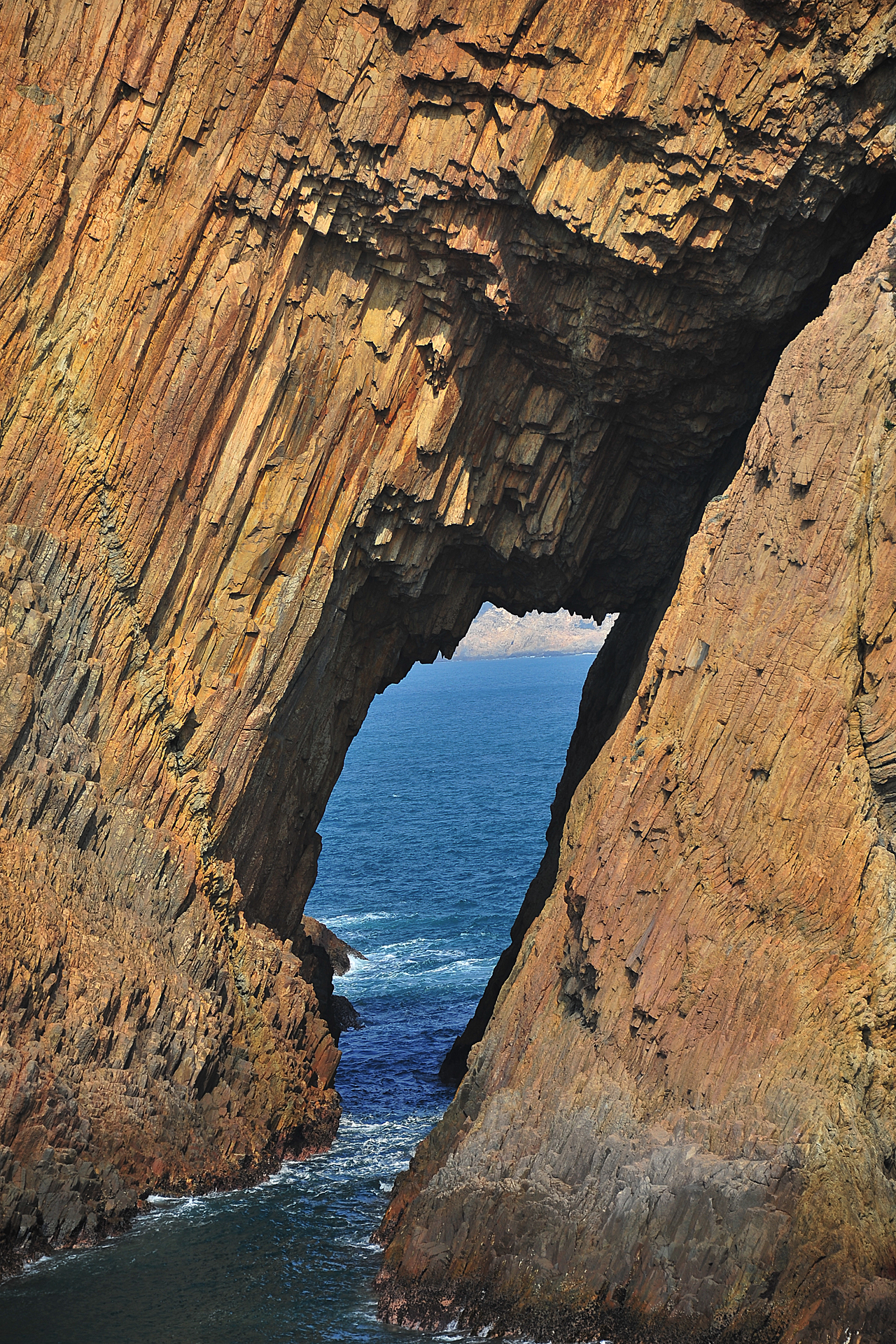
Wang Chau Kok sea arch

Hexagonal columnar joints are parallel vertical cracks that are formed when homogeneous volcanic materials cool and evenly contract inward towards a contraction centrepoint. In the early Cretaceous period, there was a volcano centred east of the Sai Kung peninsula. The final eruption of the volcano was explosive and the magma chamber was emptied, losing support in its core and resulting in the volcano's collapse. The remains became a caldera with a diameter of around 20 km. The large amount of volcanic ash produced in this eruption settled in the caldera and formed a thick layer of hot, viscous ash. The hot ash eventually cooled, solidifying within the caldera. As it did so, it contracted, forming cooling joints (visually similar to cracks) at the surface where heat was lost most rapidly to the atmosphere. As each side of each mass of ash shrunk, the sides contracted evenly towards the centre, forming regular hexagonal cracks. Starting from the surface where the ash cooled and contracted the quickest, the cracks infiltrated downwards, eventually creating the pillars.

The total number of hexagonal columns in Hong Kong is estimated to be around 200,000, covering 100 square kilometres. Diameters of the columns ranges from 1 to 3 meters where most of the columns are tilted and dip northwest at about 80 degrees. Some columns, such as those on the east dam of High Island Reservoir, are curved by tectonic force, displaying the ductile nature of the columns

The hexagonal columns in Hong Kong are light brown in colour because of the rock's silica-rich chemistry, being around 76% silica. Compared with columns in the rest of the world which are mostly basaltic or andesitic (low silica), such a large group of well-preserved and silica-rich hexagonal columns is exceedingly rare, making the hexagonal columnar landforms an important part of the UNESCO Global Geopark of Hong Kong.

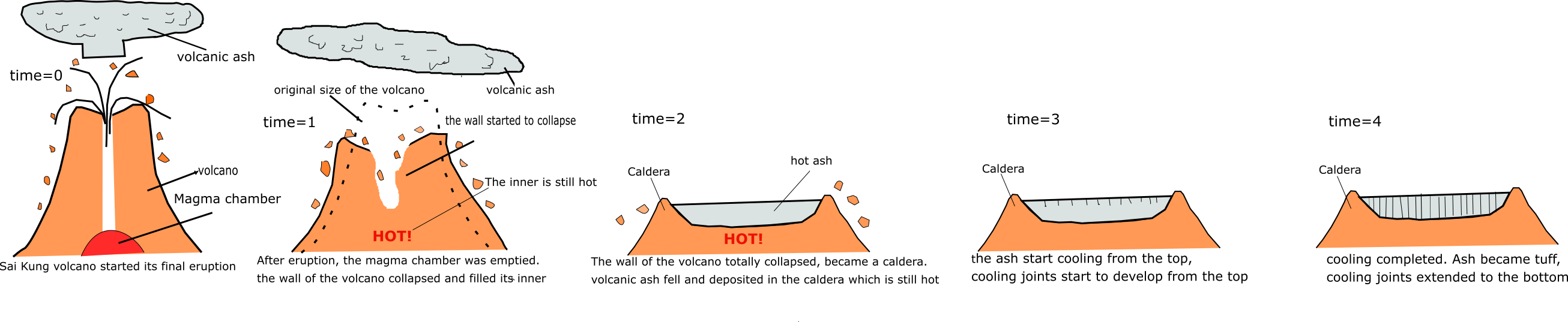
Diagram showing the formation process of the columnar joints in Sai Kung

==== IUGS Geological Heritage Site ====
In respect of it being "one of the most spectacular rhyolitic columnar rock formations in the world", the International Union of Geological Sciences (IUGS) included the "Early Cretaceous rhyolitic columnar rock formation of Hong Kong" in its assemblage of 100 geological heritage sites around the world in a listing published in October 2022. The organisation defines an IUGS Geological Heritage Site as "a key place with geological elements and/or processes of international scientific relevance, used as a reference, and/or with a substantial contribution to the development of geological sciences through history.".

=== Lion Rock and Kowloon Granite ===
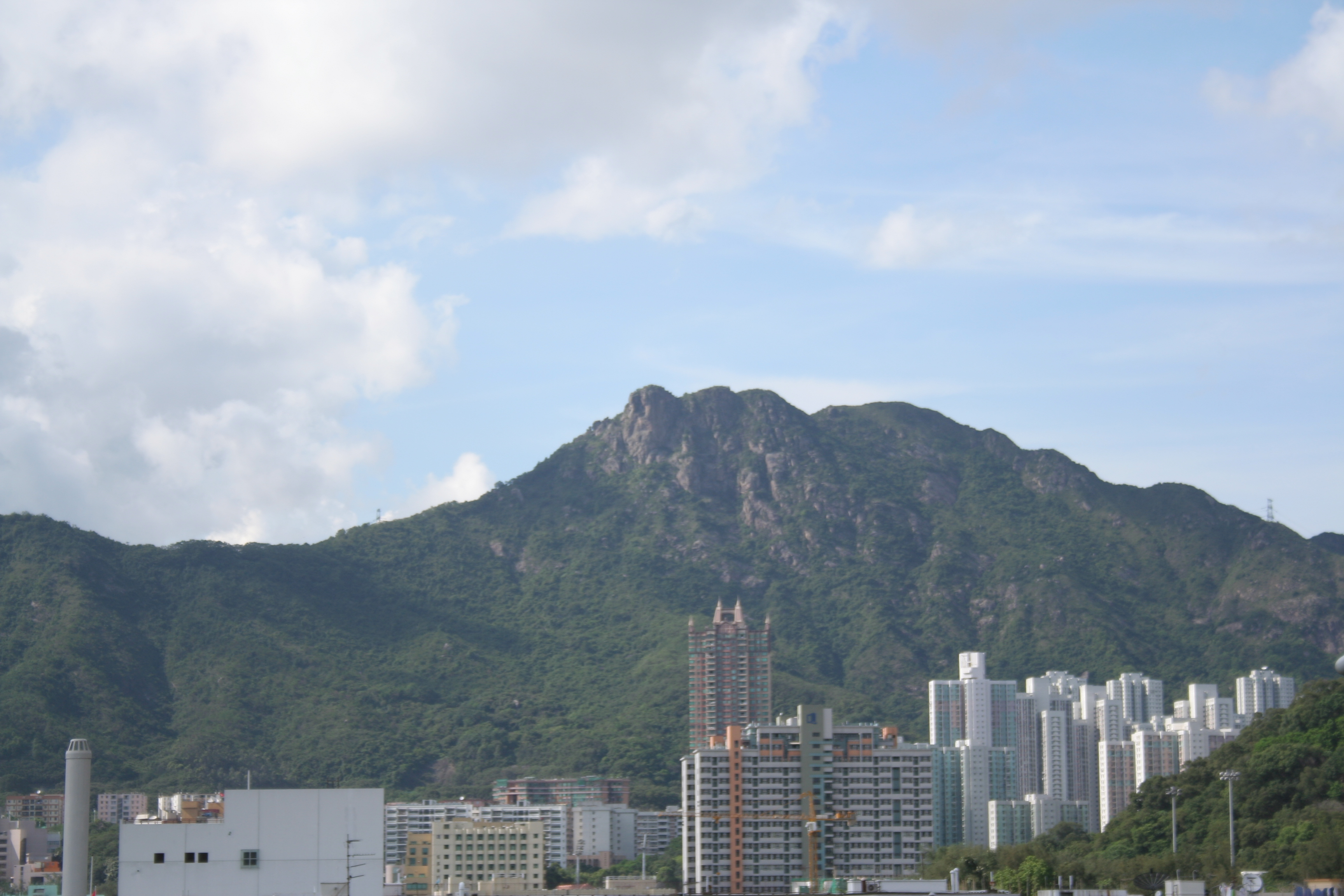
Lion rock viewed from Kowloon.

Lion rock is located on the north of Kowloon Peninsula. Its name is derived from a superficial resemblance to a lion laying down, and is often used as a city symbol and landmark of Hong Kong. Lion rock is composed of the granite that covers Kowloon, Victoria Harbour and northern Hong Kong Island. The middle part of the Kowloon granite was subjected to heavier weathering, forming the Victoria Harbour. To the north of Kowloon, granite rock formed the Lion rock and hills lining up along the northern boundary of Kowloon. Most of the buildings on the two sides of Victoria Harbour sit on the Kowloon granite.

The Kowloon granite exhibits a circular shape surrounding Victoria Harbour, and is surrounded by volcanic rocks. The volcanic rocks are oriented in such a way that they surround the circular Kowloon granite. During Early Cretaceous period, a ball shaped mass of magma rose, pushing and deforming the surrounding volcanic rocks outwards and forming the various interesting orientations of the surrounding volcanic rock.

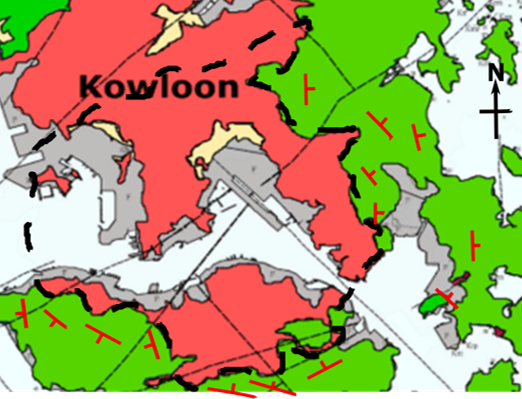
circular shaped granitic rock (marked by dashed lines) is surrounded by deformed volcanic rocks with interesting strikes that resemble the shape of the granite. The red symbols are dip strike symbols.

== Sedimentary Rock ==
The sedimentary rock that makes up around 15% of Hong Kong's terrestrial surface formed through the deposition of alluvial sediments such as sand, mud, the remains of marine plankton, and pebbles. As these sediments were continually deposited, older layers were compressed by the weight of overlying younger layers, forming sedimentary rock. Since sediments always deposit in horizontal layers, any observable deformations— such as folds— record tectonic activities.

Fossils are often better preserved in sedimentary rocks. In Hong Kong, the oldest dateable sedimentary rocks come from the Devonian period (~416 Mya), containing placoderm (a Devonian fish) fossils discovered in the Bluff Head formation in northeastern New Territories. The youngest sedimentary formations date to the Paleogene (~50 Mya) in Tung Ping Chau in northeast Hong Kong.

=== Tung Ping Chau Erosional Features ===
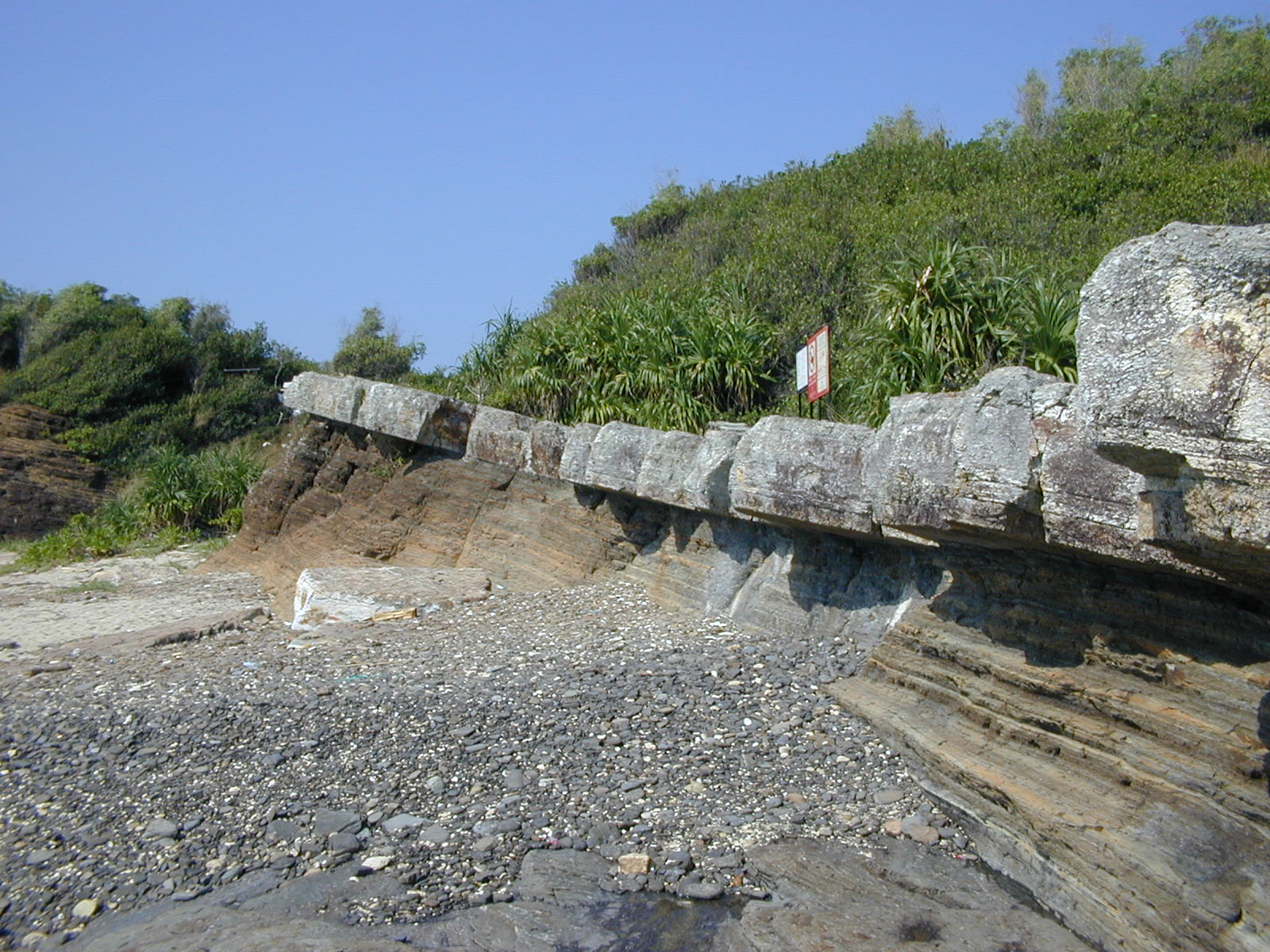
Photo from Lung Lok Shui, Tung Ping Chau. A grey chert layer (the dragon's spine) is seen in relief against the brown siltstones layers.

Tung Ping Chau (meaning "eastern flat island" in Cantonese) is a crescent-shaped island in northeast Hong Kong. Its flatness is derived from the relatively undeformed layers of its sedimentary formation. The island is famous for its spectacular erosional landforms, such as sea stacks and wave-cut platforms. Lung Lok Shui (meaning "dragon diving into the water") is a well-known geological formation that is so named as it appears like the back of a dragon descending into the sea. The structure's most prominent and titular feature, a grey layer of chert, formed in such a way due to being more resistant to erosion than the surrounding sandstone, rising above the surrounding rock in a way that resembles the spine of a dragon.

Rocks on Tung Ping Chau are fine-grained and reddish-brown due to both the increased iron oxidation during the hot, humid Paleogene period, and the weak currents depositing fine sediments. Fossils of terrestrial plants and evaporites in rocks on Tung Ping Chau indicate that it may have been a saline lake during the Paleogene.

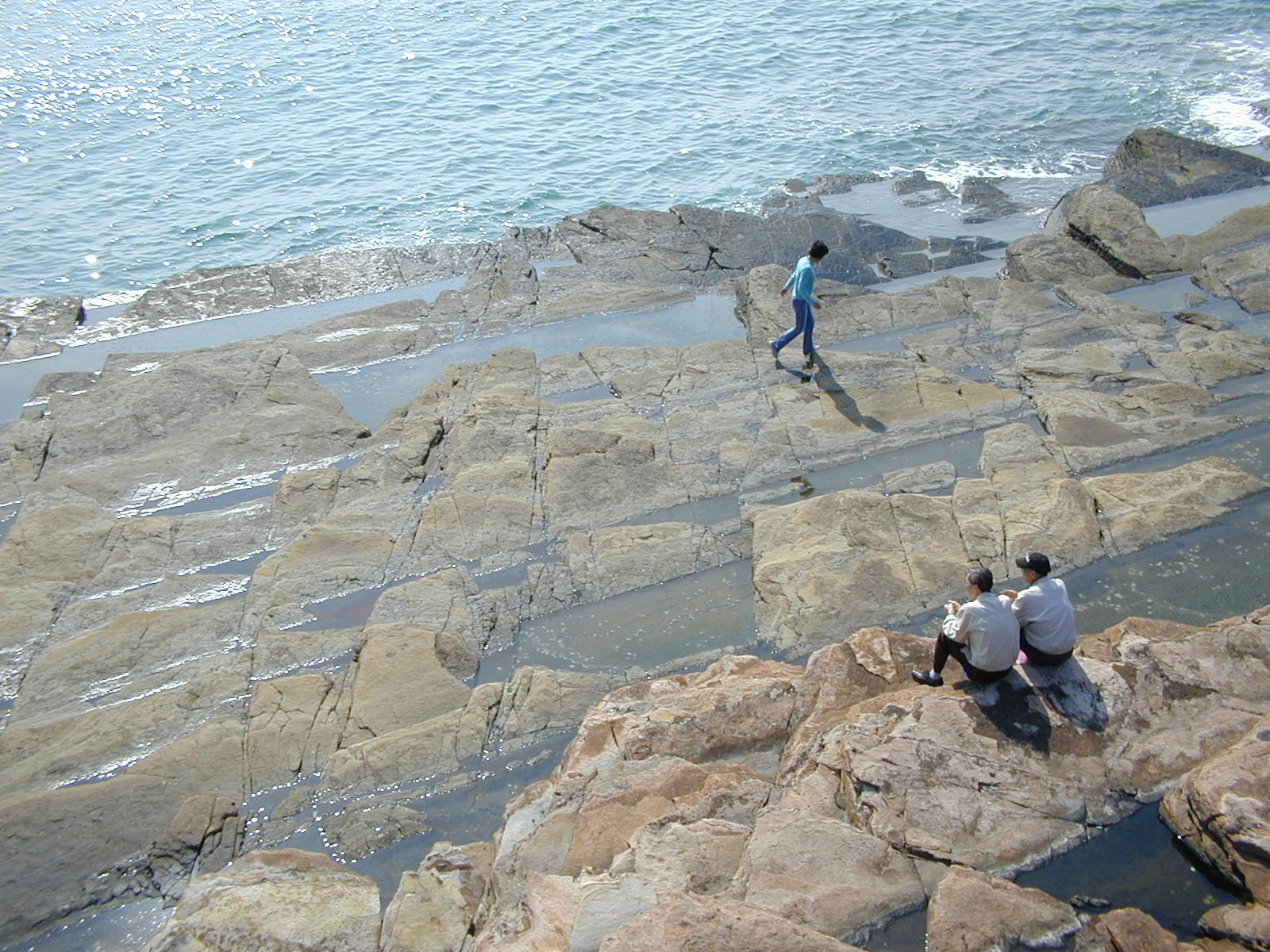
Wave-cut platform on Tung Ping Chau

=== Ma Shi Chau ===
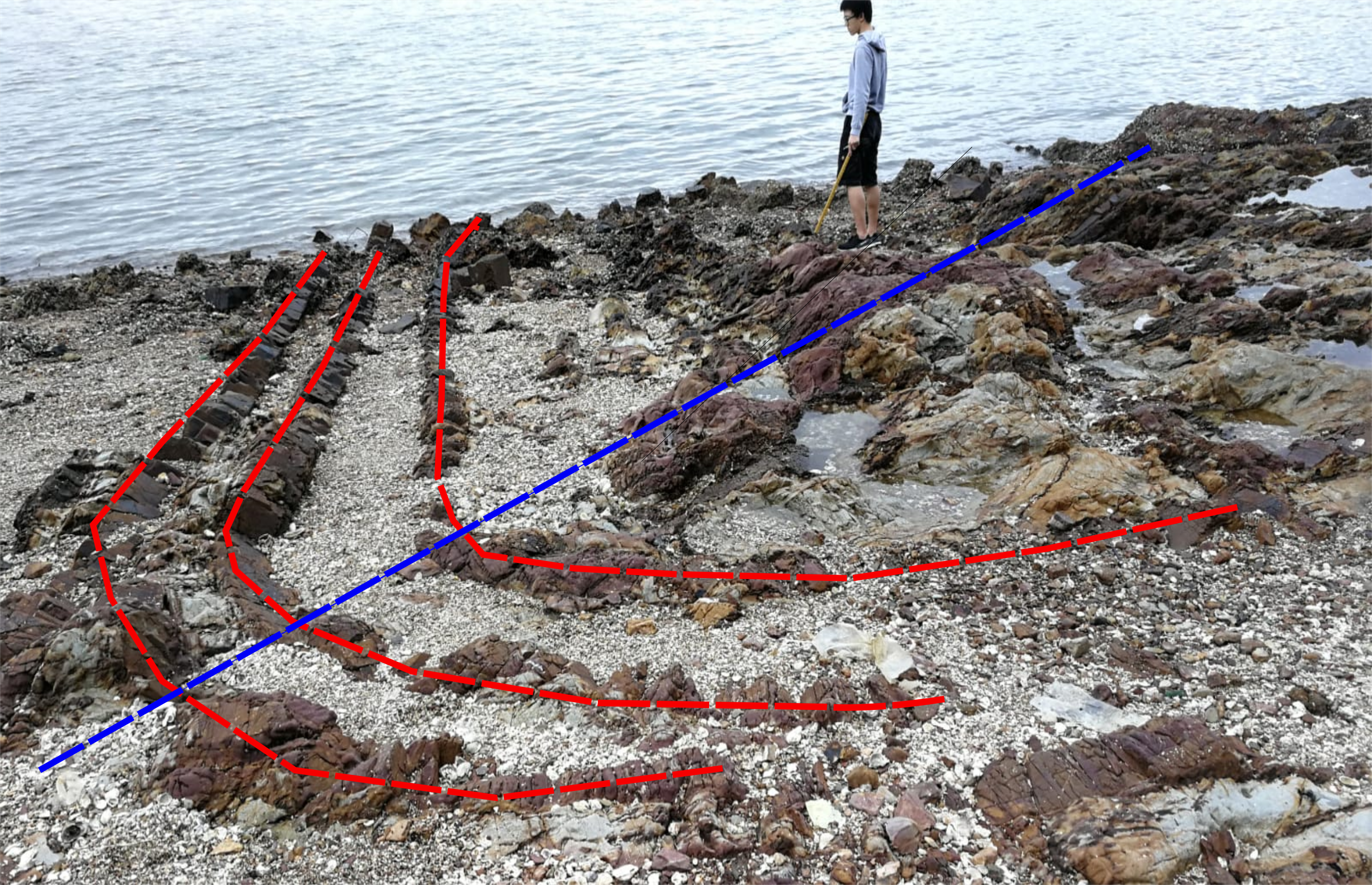
A fold on Ma Shi Chau, Hong Kong. Red lines show the limbs, the blue line shows the axis

Ma Shi Chau (meaning "horse dung island") is a tidal island in the Tolo Harbour in northeast New Territories. It is an important special area for geological studies. It contains rocks from three different formations: Permian sedimentary rocks, Early Cretaceous volcanic rocks, and Middle Cretaceous sedimentary rocks. Fossils of ammonoids, corals, and bivalves were found in the black Permian sedimentary rocks. Layers of fine volcanic ash deposits formed the light grey coloured tuffaceous layers interbedded with the brownish Cretaceous sediments. Ma Shi Chau is very close to a major fault (Tolo channel fault); the rock of Ma Shi Chau was subjected to deformation by fault activity, and thus various deformation structures such as folds, kink bands, microfaults, and sheared rock can be observed on Ma Shi Chau.

== Metamorphic Rocks ==
Metamorphic rocks made up less than 1% of Hong Kong land surface. They can be found in Lok Ma Chau near the border with Shenzhen, Ma On Shan and Yuen Long. However, metamorphic rocks in Ma On Shan and Yuen Long have only been seen in boreholes. Metamorphic rocks are sedimentary rocks or igneous rocks that are altered under high temperature and pressure but have not been not melted. Metamorphic rocks in Hong Kong are all altered sedimentary rocks formed in Carboniferous period. Until the Middle Jurassic volcanic activity, magma chambers formed and intruded into older rocks. The heat of the magma, combined with active movements along major faults in Hong Kong, created a high temperature and high pressure environment, causing the older Carboniferous sedimentary layers to metamorphose. Rocks in Lok Ma Chau became meta-sedimentary rocks and phyllites, which were low-grade metamorphic rocks. This indicates that Lok Ma Chau rocks were not much altered. However, rocks in Ma On Shan and Yuen Long, which were originally limestones, became a high-grade marble. These rocks were significantly altered by the high temperature of magma intrusions.

=== Ma On Shan Iron Ore ===
Iron ore ore bodies were found in Ma On Shan. They are both located near a granitic body, where hot magma intrusions existed during late Jurassic. The hot magma carried metal ores to the crust from the mantle as it rose. Metal ores are concentrated into hot fluids as it forced itself into cracks of the Ma On Shan limestone. The hot concentrated fluid (hydrothermal fluid) triggered chemical reactions. This process finally produced skarn, which an altered rock that carried the concentrated metal ores.

Mining in Ma On Shan first started in 1906 and became very active during the second World War for weapon production. Later, in 1976, the mine was closed down due to dropping metal prices. Today, the mining tunnels and mining pit can still be seen in Ma On Shan.

== Faulting ==
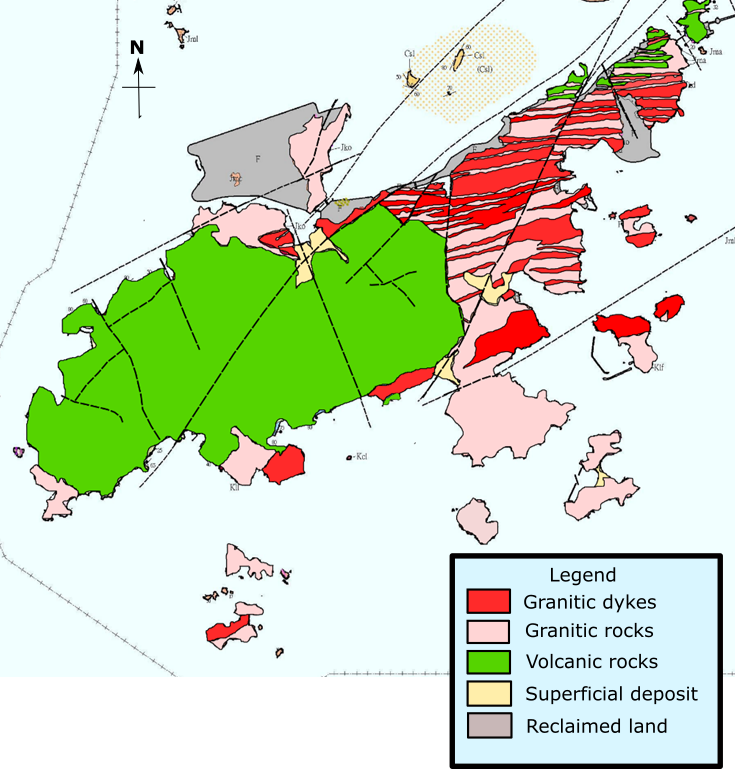
A simplified geological map showing the Lantau dyke swarm and faults bounding the dyke swarm.Modified from Civil Engineering Development Department.

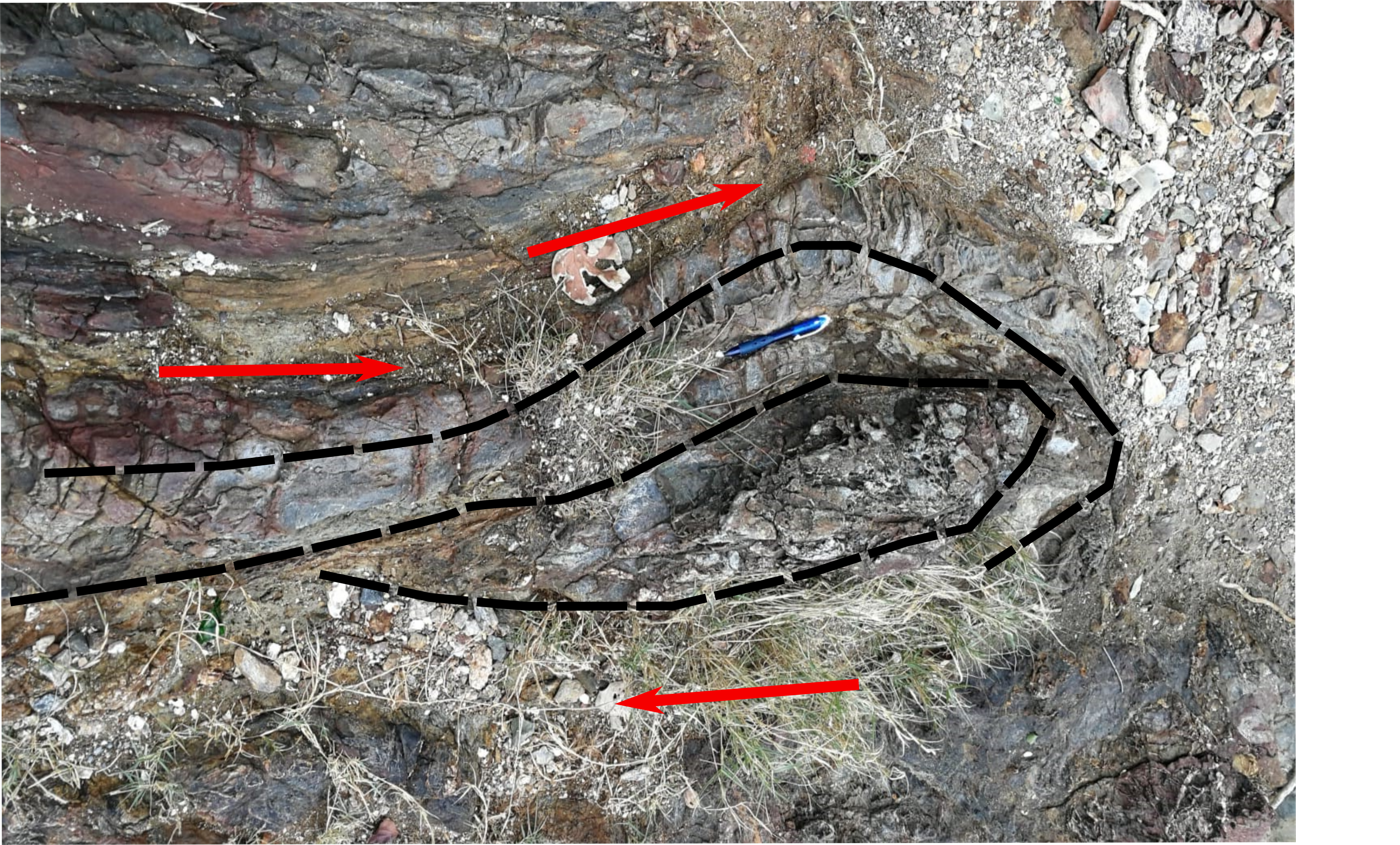
A drag fold formed by upper layer moving right, lower layer moving left. The middle layer is dragged and rolled over, forming a drag fold. Red arrows showed the direction of motion of the upper layer and the lower layer. (Photo took in Nai Chung)

The main faults in Hong Kong are oriented northeast–southwest, and northwest–southeast (see fig.1). They are generally of the same orientation as those in neighbouring Guangdong Province. They are part of the Lianhuashan fault zone that contains faults of similar orientations extended along the southeast China coast to Shanghai.

Although faults are recorded throughout the known geological history of Hong Kong, they are considered to have been most active during the Jurassic to Cretaceous periods when strike-slip and thrust faulting was dominant. Some faults represent structures that were active during the period of Late Jurassic to Early Cretaceous volcanic activity and facilitated the rise of magma to the surface. Faults in Hong Kong formed interesting features that can be traced to understand their activities.

=== Lantau Dyke Swarm ===
The Lantau dyke swarm is located on east Lantau Island; it is a group of vertical sheets of rocks formed by magma and lava flowing into northeast trending cracks in pre-existing granitic rocks on Lantau Island. Said cracks were related to the northeast trending faults. The Lantau caldera, which was the volcanic centre of the magma, is also bounded by faults and exhibits an elongated shape towards the northeast. These structures recorded the active strike-slip motion of the northeast trending faults in Lantau Island during Late Jurassic. (~148 million years ago).

=== Tolo Channel Fault System ===
The Tolo Channel fault system is the longest fault system in Hong Kong running from Tolo Channel in the northeast, cutting through Shing Mun river in Sha Tin and extending to southeast Lantau Island, being approximately 60-km long. Traces of displacements and shearing are well-preserved in rock units on both sides of the Tolo Channel, such as kink bands, microfaults, veins on the north coast of Ma Chi Chau, en echelon veins, drag folds, and sigma structures on the south coast Nai Chung. These structures are all found in the middle Jurassic Tolo Channel formation sedimentary rocks and are traces of shearing events, representing the most active period of the Tolo Channel fault systems during the middle Jurassic volcanic activity.

== See also ==
- Hong Kong Global Geopark
- Mining in Hong Kong
- 1972 Hong Kong landslide
