= Yeung Chau, Tai Po District =

Uninhabited island of Hong Kong

Coordinates: 22.461405°N 114.221371°E

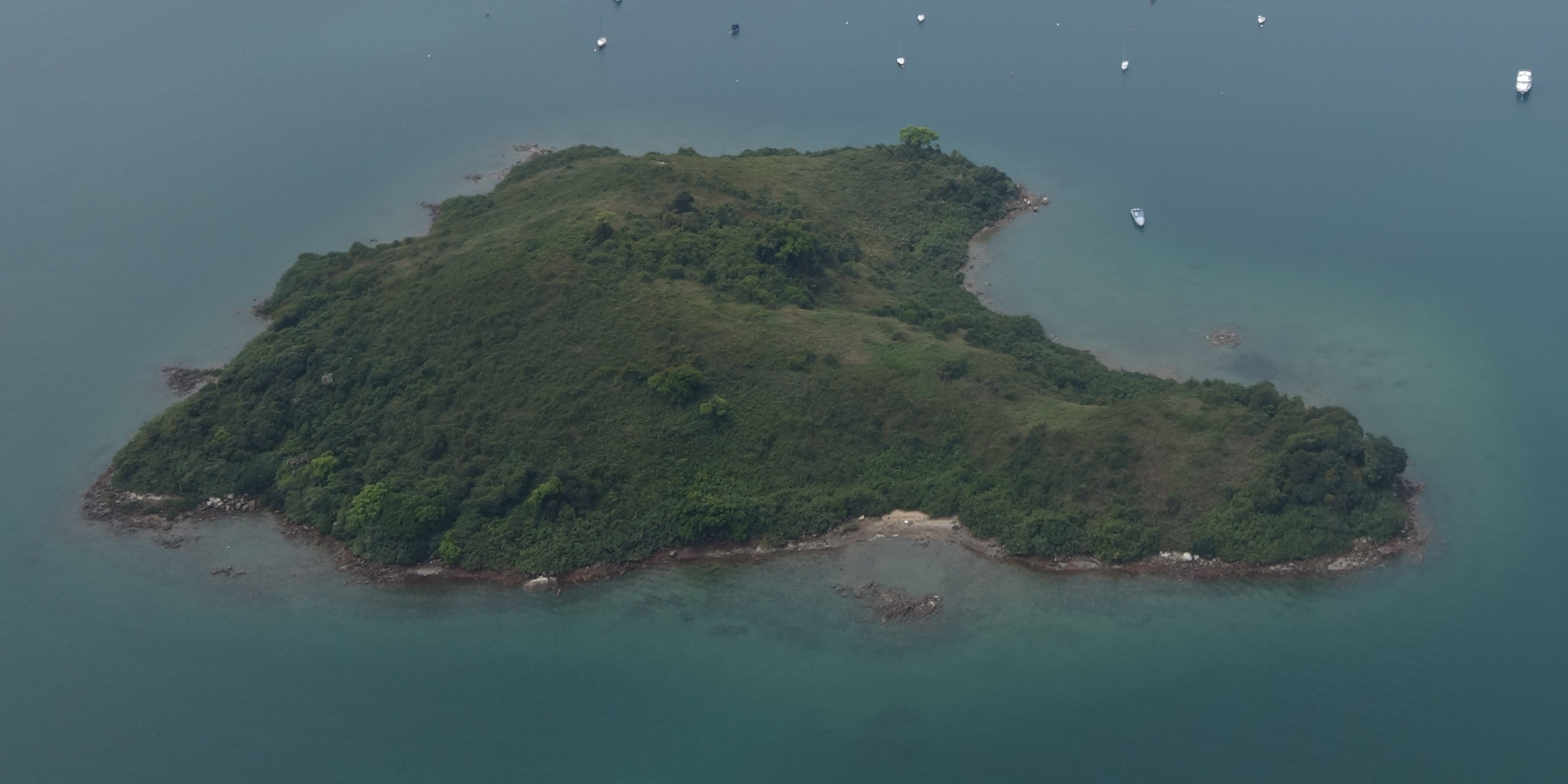
Aerial View of Yeung Chau

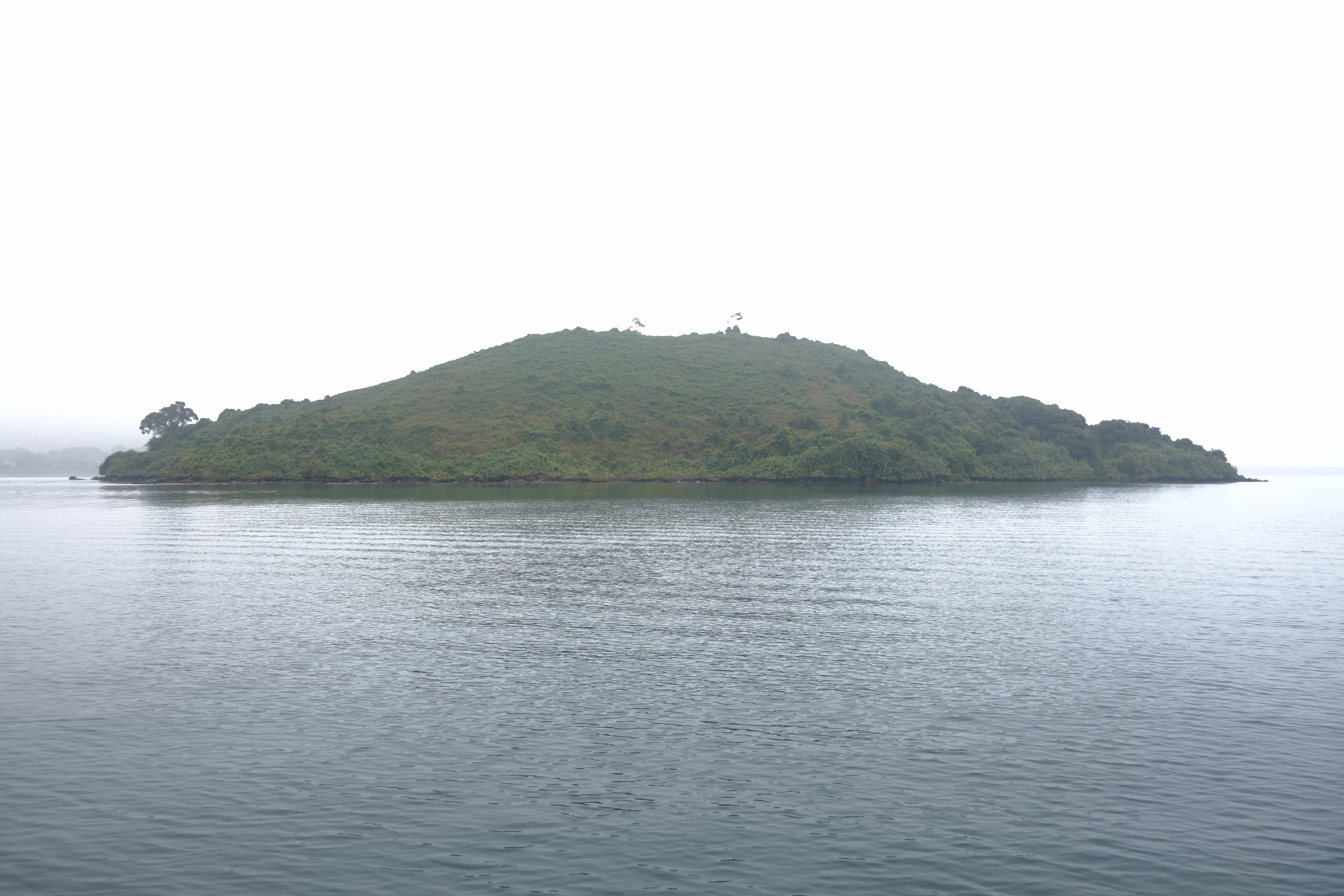
Typical subtropical island blanketed with lush green vegetation year-round

Yeung Chau (Chinese: 洋洲) is an uninhabited island of Hong Kong located in Plover Cove, Tolo Harbour, in the northwestern part of the territory. Administratively, it is part of Tai Po District.

== Conservation ==
Yeung Chau is part of the Ma Shi Chau Special Area, together with three other islands in Tolo Harbour, namely Ma Shi Chau, Centre Island and an unnamed island located about 100 metres northeast of the shore of Yim Tin Tsai near Sam Mun Tsai New Village. The Special Area was designated in 1999.
