= Ma Shi Chau Special Area =

Coordinates: 22.4533°N 114.2287°E

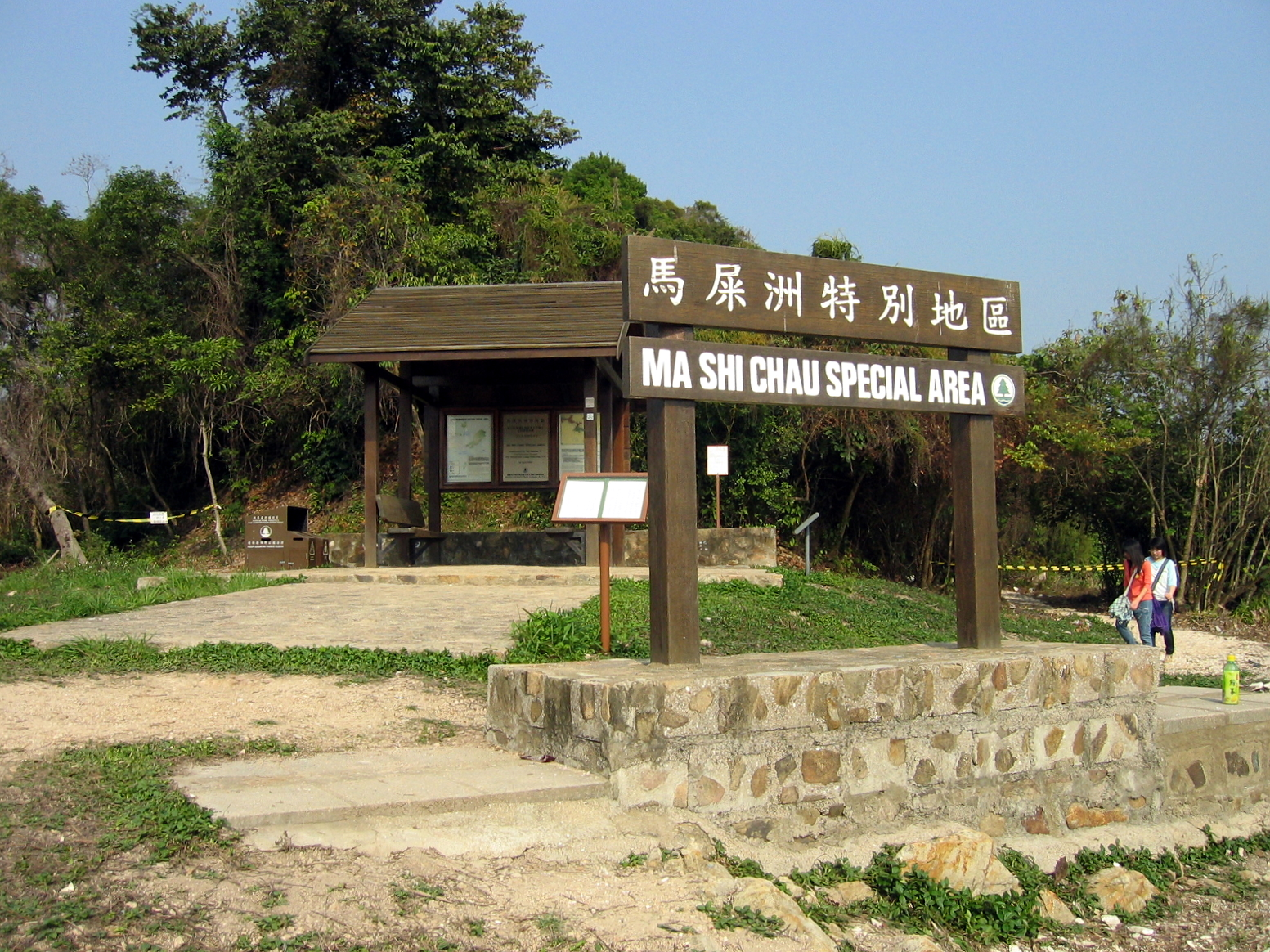
Ma Shi Chau Special Area sign

Ma Shi Chau Special Area (Chinese: 馬屎洲特別地區) is a Special Area of Hong Kong. It is located in Tai Po District and in Tolo Harbour, in the northeast of the New Territories.

The Special Area comprises four islands in Tolo Harbour, namely Ma Shi Chau, Centre Island, Yeung Chau and an unnamed island located about 100 metres (330 ft) northeast of the shore of Yim Tin Tsai near Sam Mun Tsai New Village.

It was designated in 1999 and covers 61 hectares.

This area is considered a geological wonder, there are rocks over 280 million years old from the Permian period.

== See also ==
- Conservation in Hong Kong
