= Yeung Chau =

Yeung Chau is the name of three different islands in Hong Kong:

- Yeung Chau, North District (Chinese: 洋洲), in North District
- Yeung Chau, Sai Kung District (羊洲; 'Sheep Island'), in Sai Kung District
- Yeung Chau, Tai Po District (洋洲), in Tai Po District
