= Plover Cove Reservoir =

Reservoir in New Territories, Hong Kong

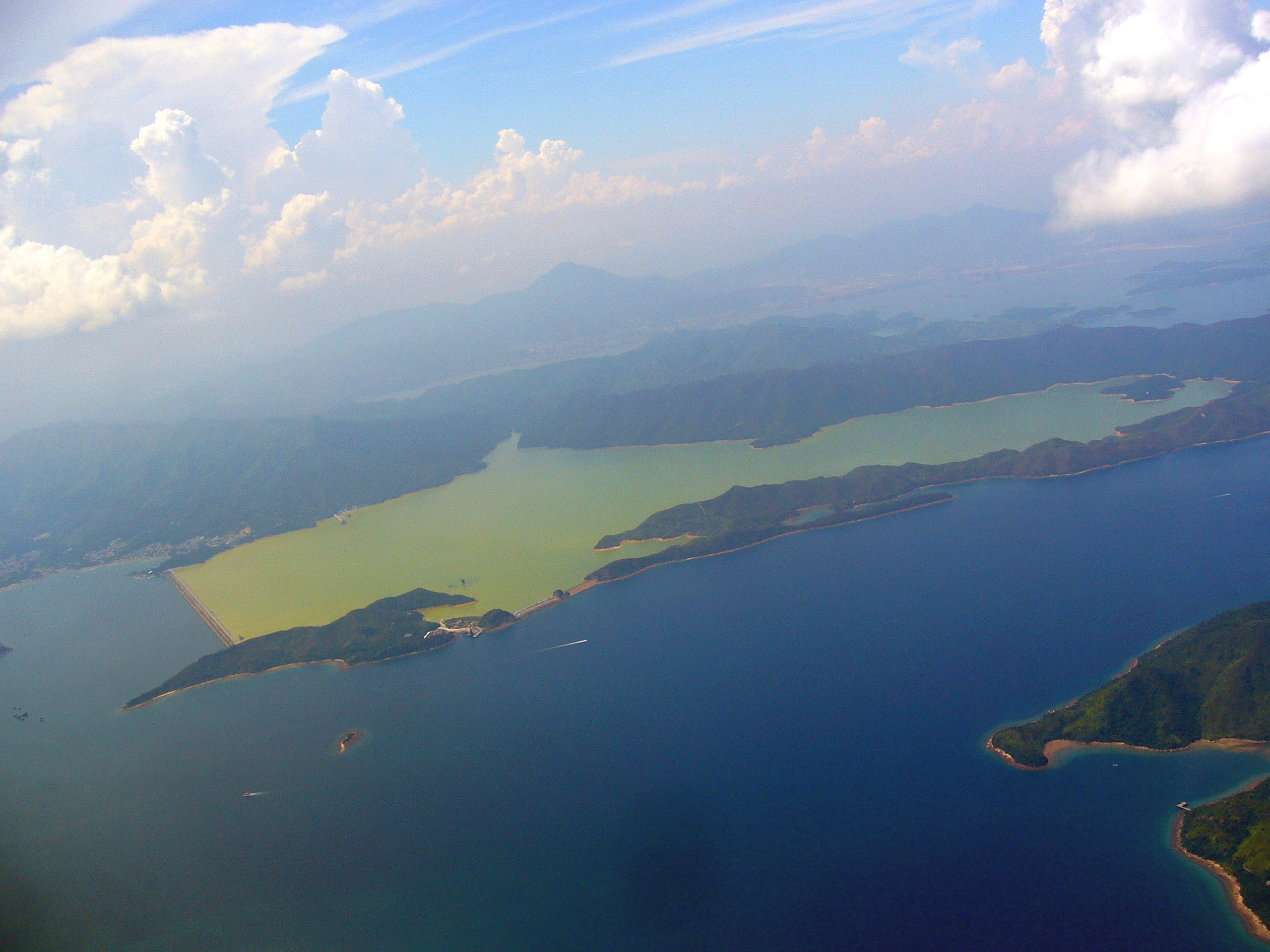
- Aerial view of Plover Cove Reservoir

- Location within Hong Kong
- Location: New Territories, Hong Kong
- Coordinates: 22°28′15″N 114°15′10″E
- Type: coastal reservoir
- Managing agency: Water Supplies Department
- Water volume: 230,000,000 cubic metres (8.1×10^{9} cu ft)

Plover Cove Reservoir
- Traditional Chinese: 船灣淡水湖
- Simplified Chinese: 船湾淡水湖
Transcriptions
Standard Mandarin
- Hanyu Pinyin: Chuánwān Dànshuǐhú
Yue: Cantonese
- Yale Romanization: Syùhn wāan táahm séui wùh
- Jyutping: Syun4 waan1 taam5 seoi2 wu4

Plover Cove Reservoir, located within Plover Cove Country Park, in the northeastern New Territories, is the largest reservoir in Hong Kong by surface areas, and the second-largest by volume. Its main dam, which disconnected Plover Cove from the sea, was one of the largest in the world at the time of its construction.

== History ==
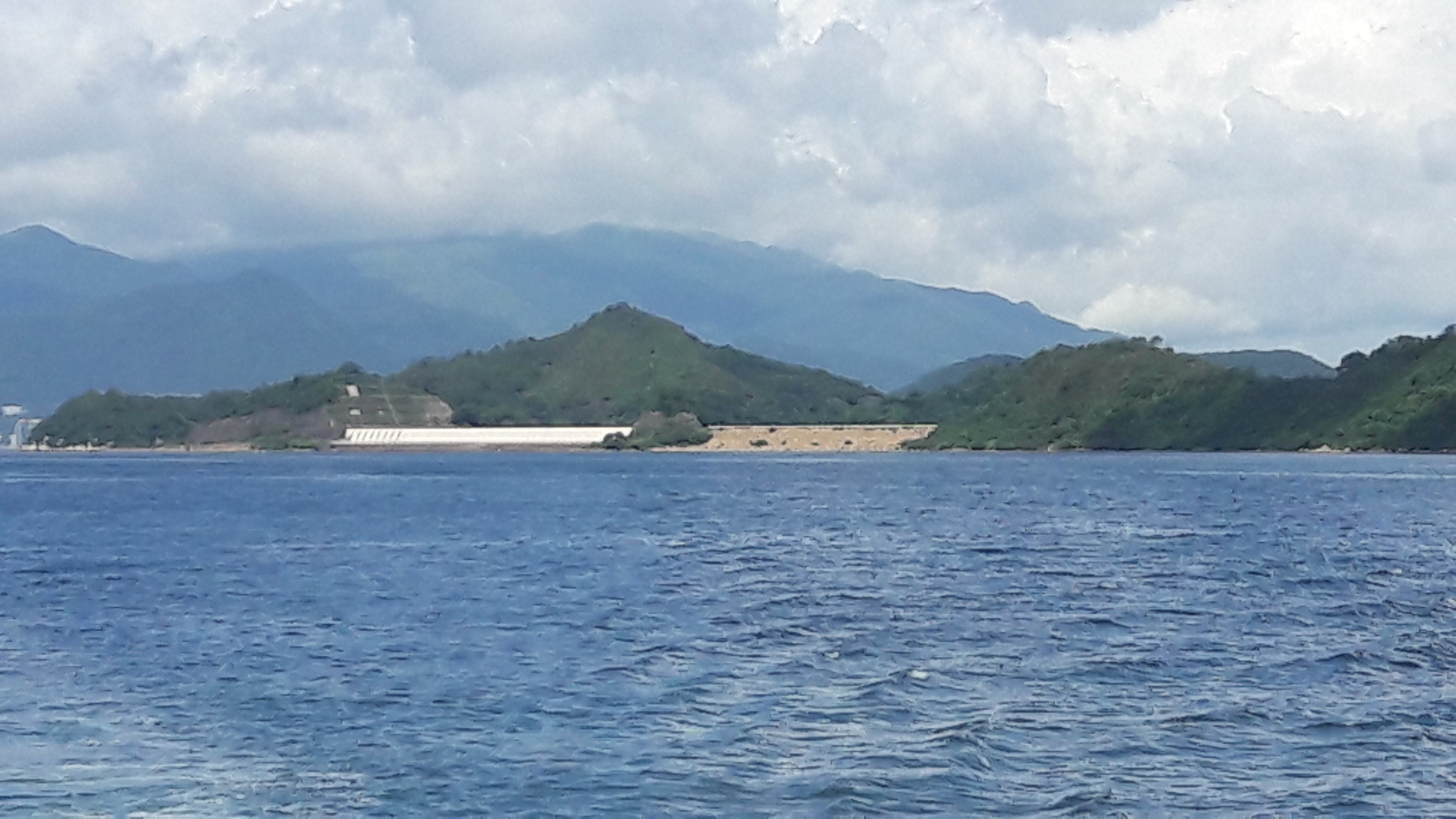
Service Dam for Plover Cove Reservoir (Northern one on the right, Southern one on the left.)

=== Planning ===
Hong Kong lacks significant natural inland water bodies, and providing water supply to the territory's population has long been fraught with problems. On 24 July 1958, an official spokesman stated that government engineers were studying the idea of converting sea inlets into freshwater lakes, citing Plover Cove as one of the foremost areas under consideration. The plan was considered feasible as the cove was mostly enclosed on three sides, and could be fully cut off from the sea by damming sections of the Tolo Harbour that were known to be very shallow.

The government hired the engineering consultancy Binnie, Deacon and Gourley to undertake a preliminary investigation. In mid-1959 the engineers delivered a report confirming the feasibility of the plan and laying out the basic arrangement of the proposed dams. They estimated that construction would cost about HK$348 million, plus approximately $60 million for the associated water distribution network.

=== Construction ===
One main dam and three service dams were built to shut the cove off from the sea. The cove was then drained and converted into a freshwater lake.

Construction work commenced in 1960 and was completed in 1968, providing a capacity of 170 million m^{3}. Work on raising the height of the dams began in 1970. Upon completion in 1973, the reservoir capacity was increased to 230 million m^{3}.

The dam of the reservoir is 28 metres tall and approximately 2 km long. Besides rain from its catchment, it also stores water imported by pipes from the East River in China. The Bride's Pool flows into the Plover Cove Reservoir.

== Displaced people ==
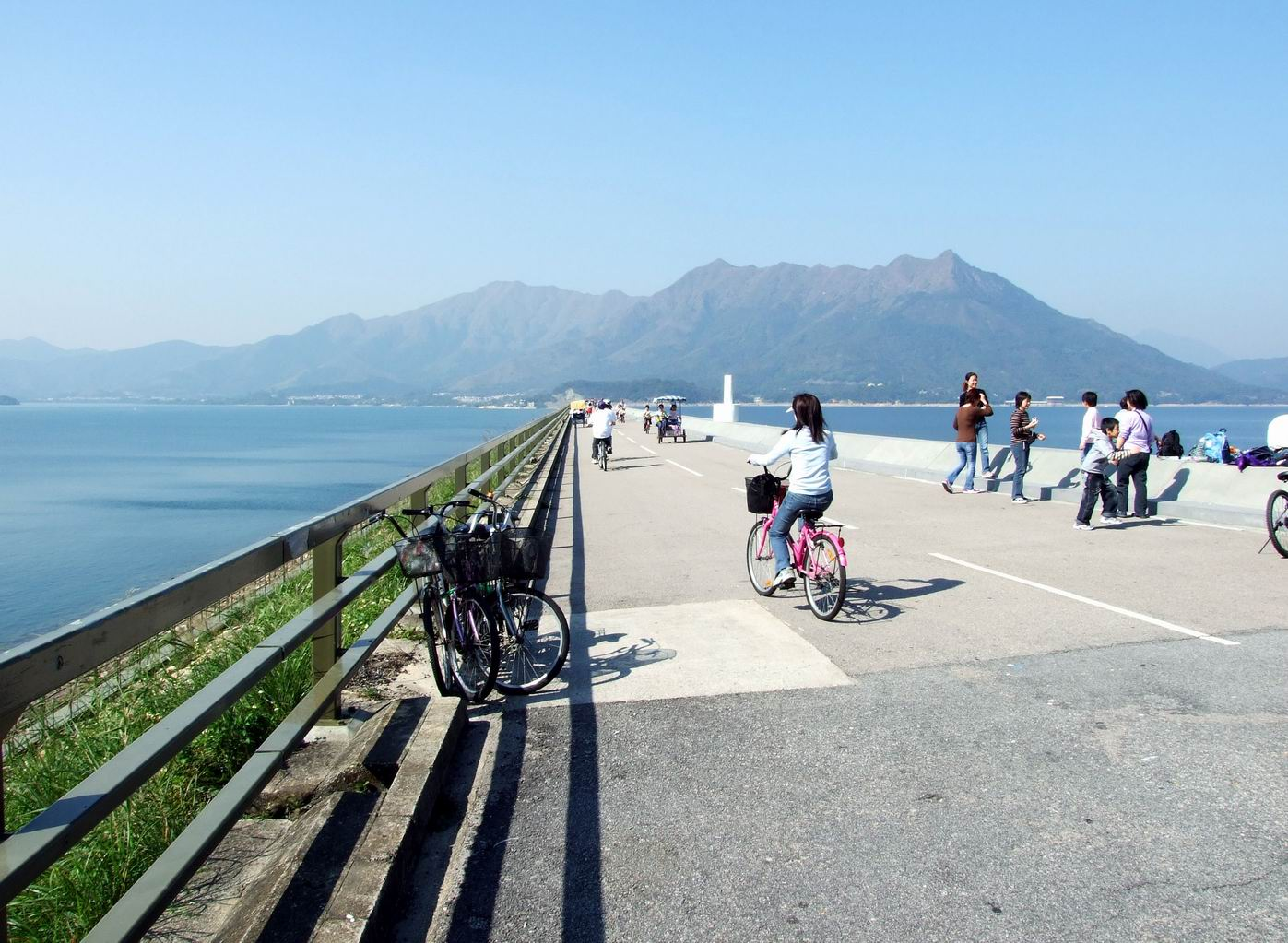
Road on top of the main dam.

The creation of the Plover Cove Reservoir necessitated the displacement of the inhabitants of a number of Hakka villages which were submerged by the reservoir. The Hakka villagers were compensated by the Hong Kong British colonial government with apartments and shop units along Kwong Fuk Road in Tai Po known as "Luk Heung San Tsuen" (Chinese: 六鄉新村; lit. 'new village for six villages') which were built for their resettlement there.

Fisherman who used to live at the original Sam Mun Tsai site, close to Tai Kau of Luk Heung, now at the northeastern shore of Reservoir, were relocated to Sam Mun Tsai New Village on the island of Yim Tin Tsai in 1966. At the time, 36 families were moved to housing on land.

== The reservoir today ==
Plover Cove Reservoir supports a diverse wildlife, including many freshwater fish species. Tai Mei Tuk at the northwestern end of the main dam is a popular barbecue site in Hong Kong.

== See also ==
- Conservation in Hong Kong
- List of reservoirs of Hong Kong
- Scott Wilson Group
- Water supply and sanitation in Hong Kong
