= Centre Island, Hong Kong =

Small uninhabited island of Hong Kong

Coordinates: 22.4392°N 114.2220°E

- Chinese: 丫洲
Transcriptions
Standard Mandarin
- Hanyu Pinyin: Yā Zhōu
Yue: Cantonese
- Jyutping: aa1 zau1

Location of Centre Island within Hong Kong

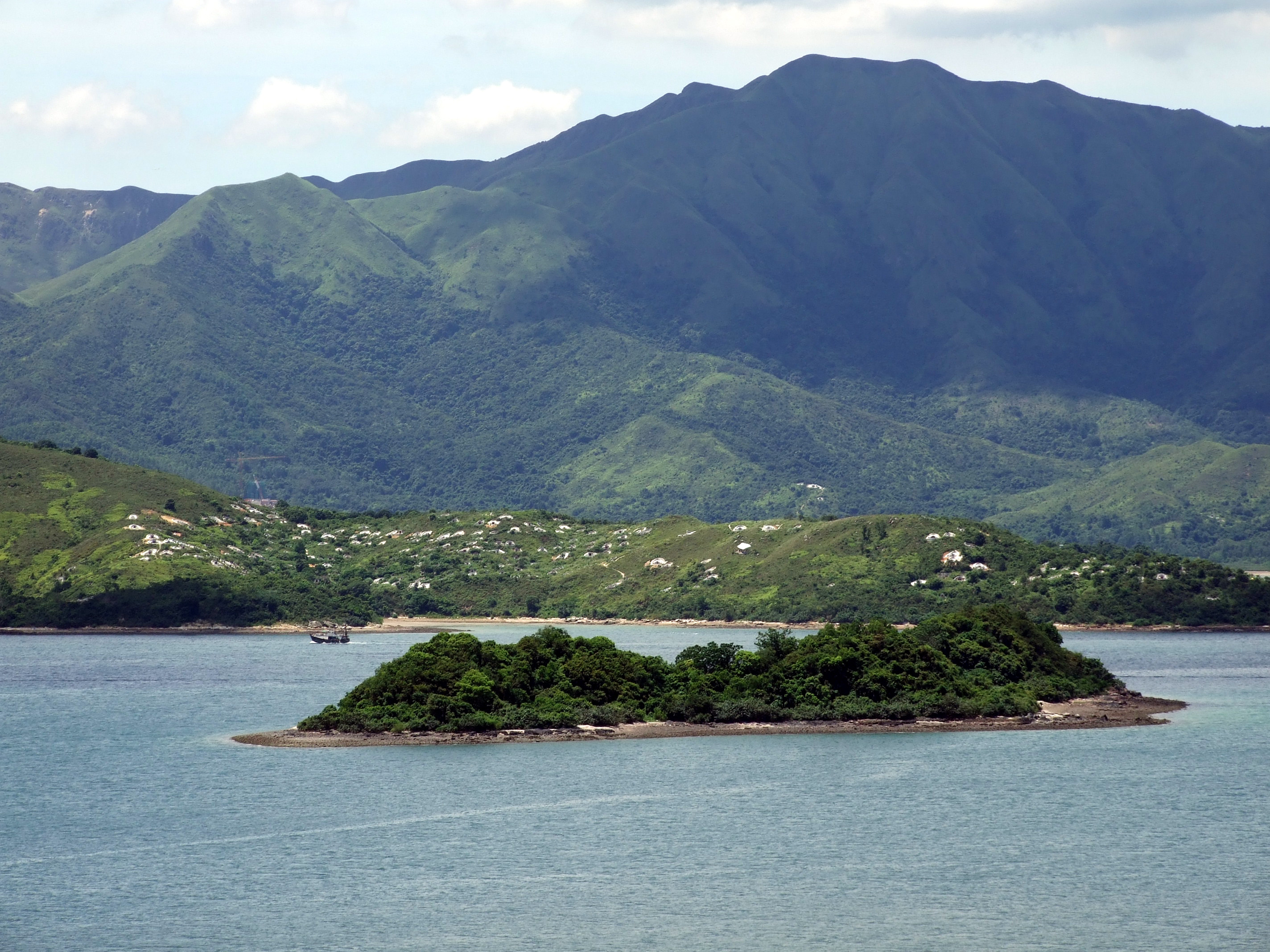
View of Centre Island, with the island of Yim Tin Tsai in the background

Centre Island or A Chau (Chinese: 丫洲) is a small uninhabited island of Hong Kong located in Tolo Harbour, in the northeastern part of the territory. Administratively, it is part of Tai Po District.

== Geography ==
The island has an area of 0.035 km^{2} (0.014 sq mi). Its highest point is at 26.8 m (88 ft).

The island has a partially rugged coastline with sections with sandy beaches. The interior of the island is covered by trees.

== History ==
A mid-Neolithic prehistoric site dating back to about 6,000 years ago has been identified on Centre Island during a survey conducted in 1997–1998. Prehistoric sites have been discovered on two other islands of Tolo Harbour, namely Yuen Chau Tsai (3,000 years, Bronze Age) and Yim Tin Tsai (4,000 years, late Neolithic).

== Conservation ==
Centre Island was designated a Site of Special Scientific Interest in 1982. The designation is based on the geological interest of the island.

Centre Island is part of the Ma Shi Chau Special Area, together with three other islands in Tolo Harbour, namely Ma Shi Chau, Yeung Chau and an unnamed island located about 100 m northeast of the shore of Yim Tin Tsai near Sam Mun Tsai New Village. The Special Area was designated in 1999.
