= Ma Shi Chau =

Tidal island of Hong Kong

Coordinates: 22°27′13.94″N 114°13′45.33″E

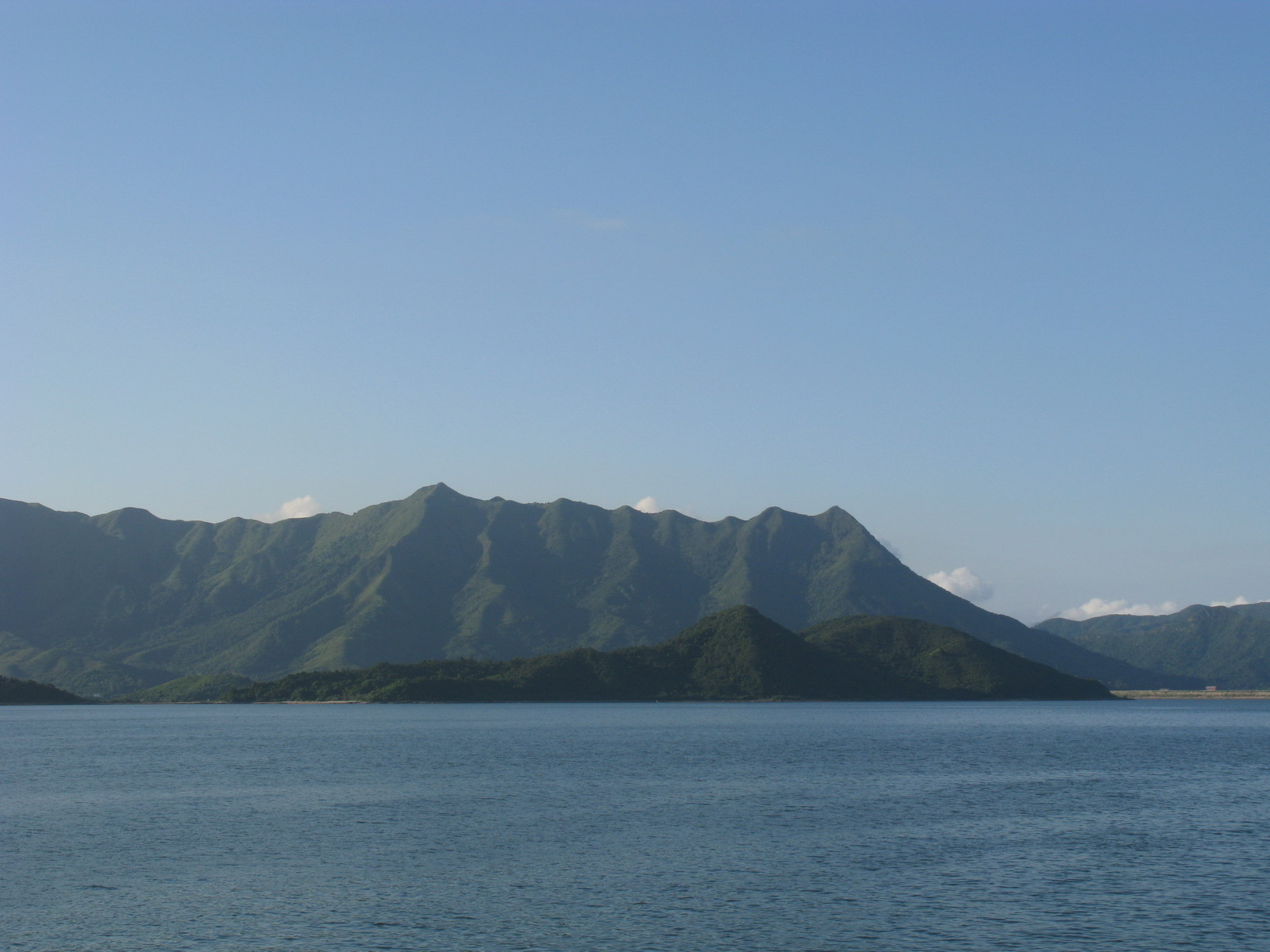
Ma Shi Chau (front) and the Pat Sin Leng mountain range (rear)

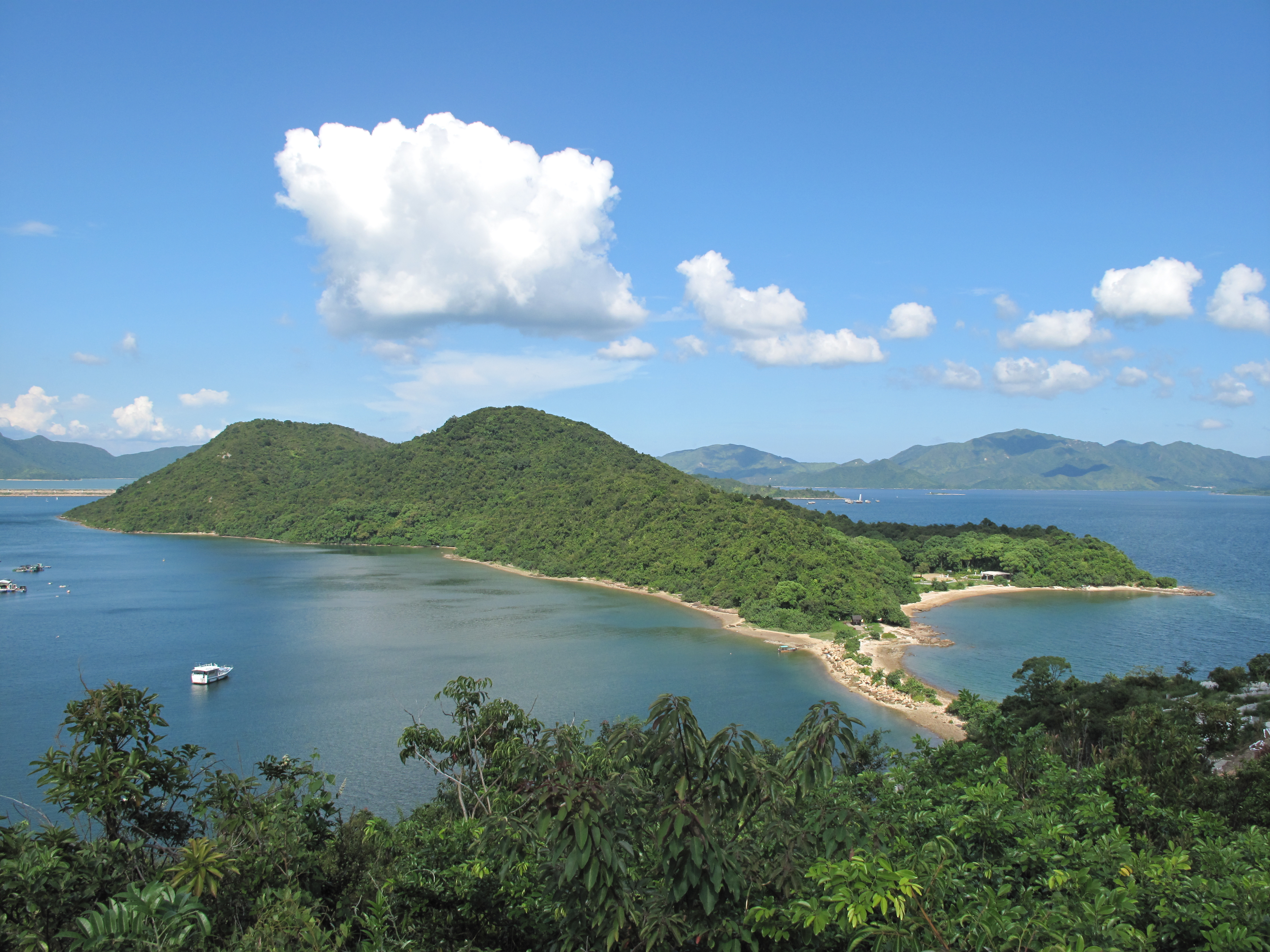
View of the tombolo connecting Ma Shi Chau to Yim Tin Tsai.

Ma Shi Chau (Chinese: 馬屎洲; Sidney Lau: Ma^{5}Si^{2}Jau^{1}, literally "Horse Dung Island") is an island of Hong Kong, under the administration of Tai Po District. It is located in Tolo Harbour in the northeast New Territories (near Sam Mun Tsai). It is connected with another island, Yim Tin Tsai, by a tombolo traversable at low tide.

It was previously known as No Kot Chai and No Kot Choi (Chinese: 螺角洲).

== Geography ==
Ma Shi Chau has an area of 0.61 km^{2}. It is part of the Ma Shi Chau Special Area, as it exhibits tombolo and tide features rarely seen in Hong Kong. It is the largest island of the four in the Special Area, the others being Yeung Chau, Centre Island and an unnamed island near Yim Tin Tsai.

It has sedimentary rock dating back to the Permian period that is protected by its Special Area status.

== See also ==
- Tidal island
