= Yim Tin Tsai (Tai Po District) =

Island of Hong Kong

Coordinates: 22.451°N 114.214°E

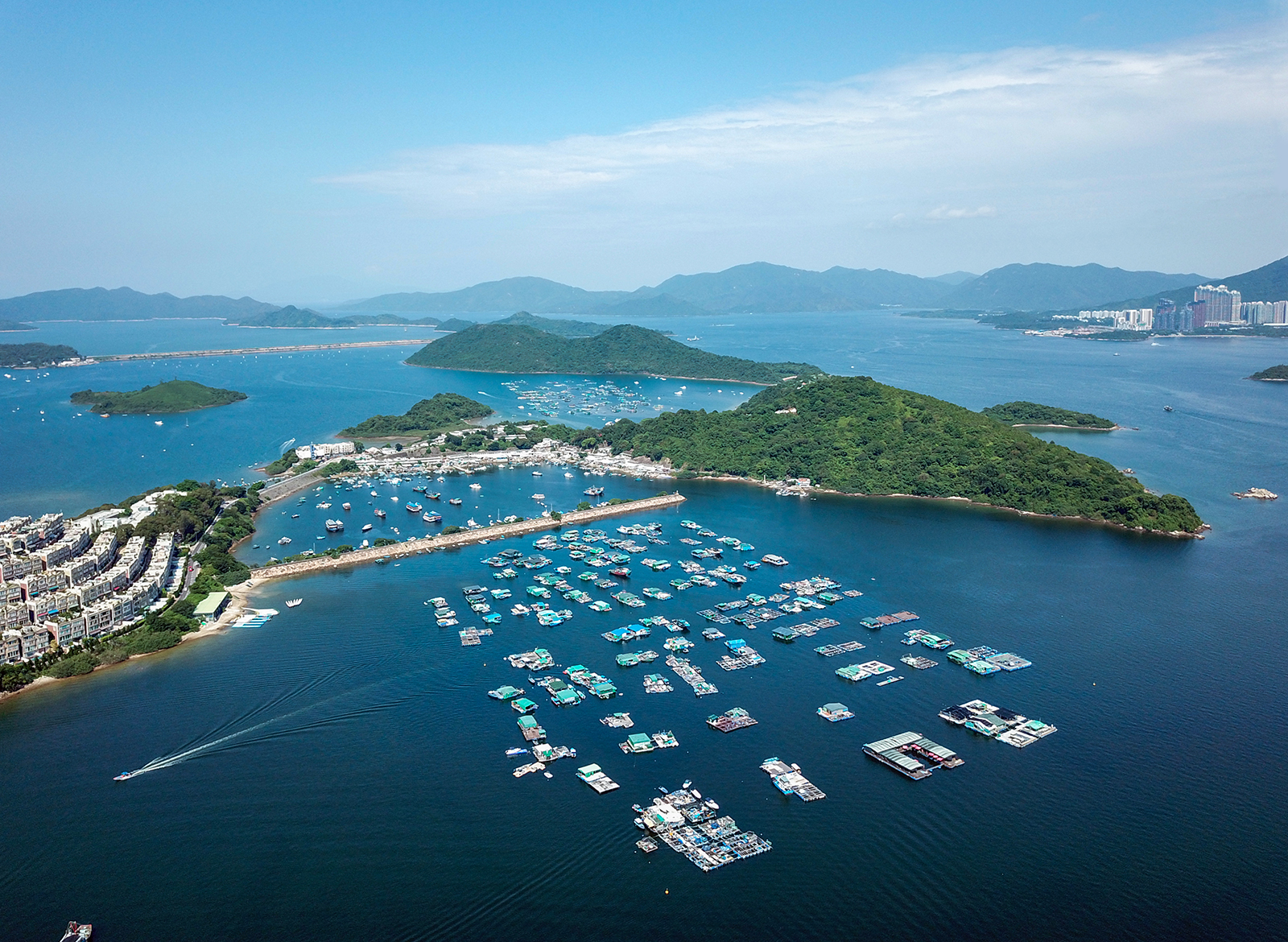
- Aerial view of Yim Tin Tsai and Shuen Wan Typhoon Shelter. The buildings on the left belong to The Beverly Hills. Ma Shi Chau is visible at the back
- Traditional Chinese: 鹽田仔
- Simplified Chinese: 鹽田仔
Transcriptions
Standard Mandarin
- Hanyu Pinyin: Yántián zǐ

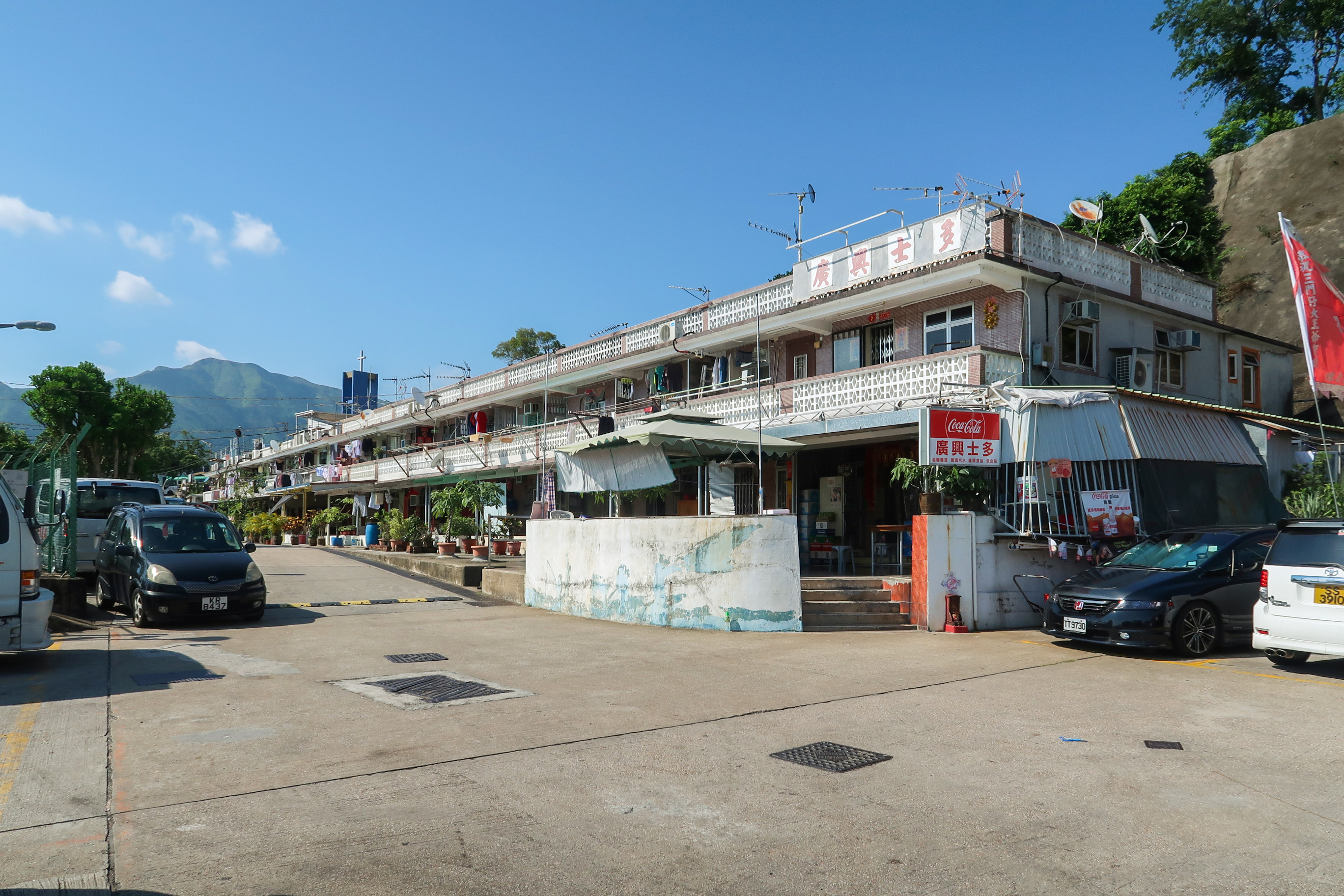
Sam Mun Tsai New Village.

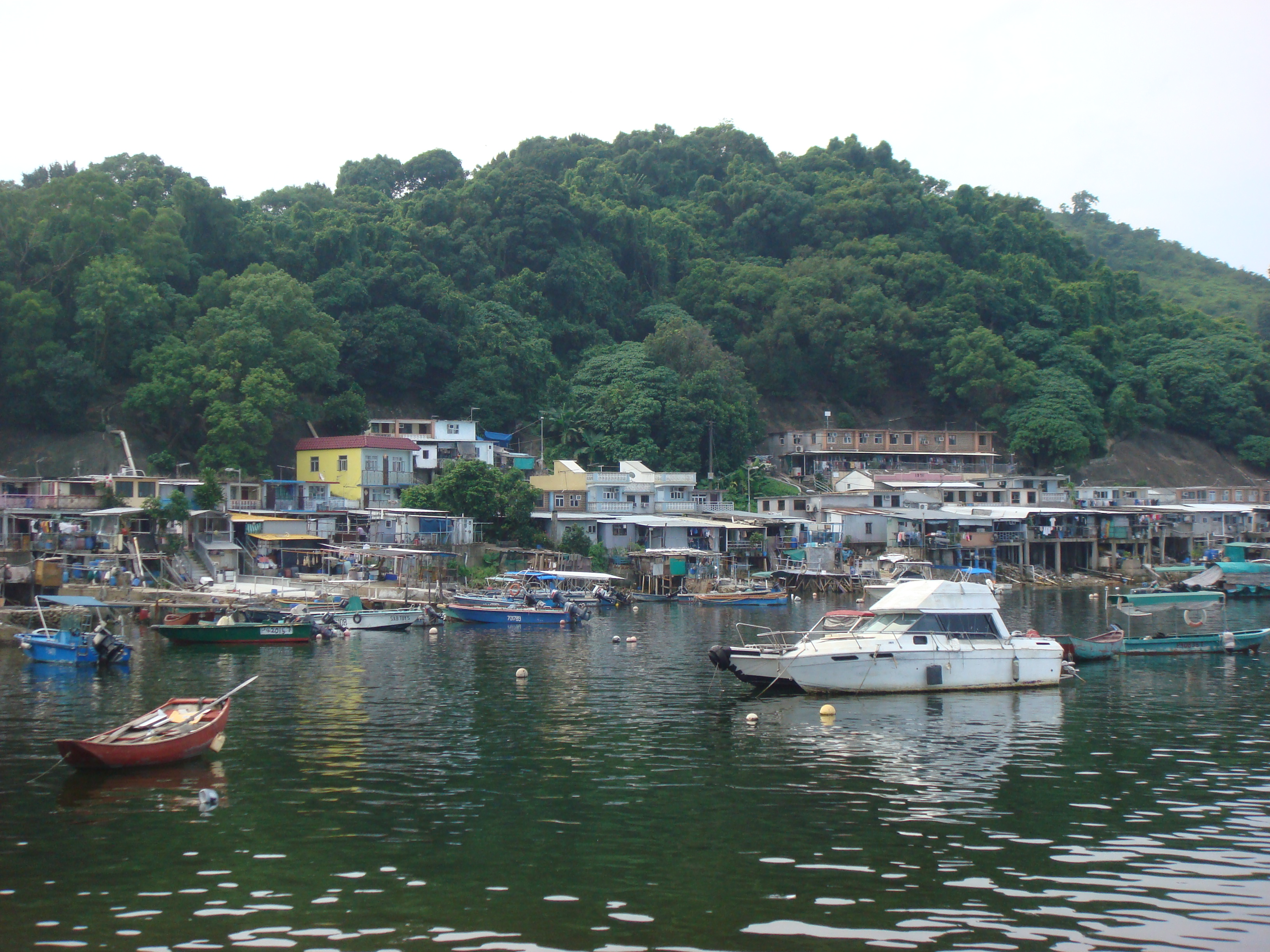
Sam Mun Tsai New Village viewed from Shuen Wan Typhoon Shelter.

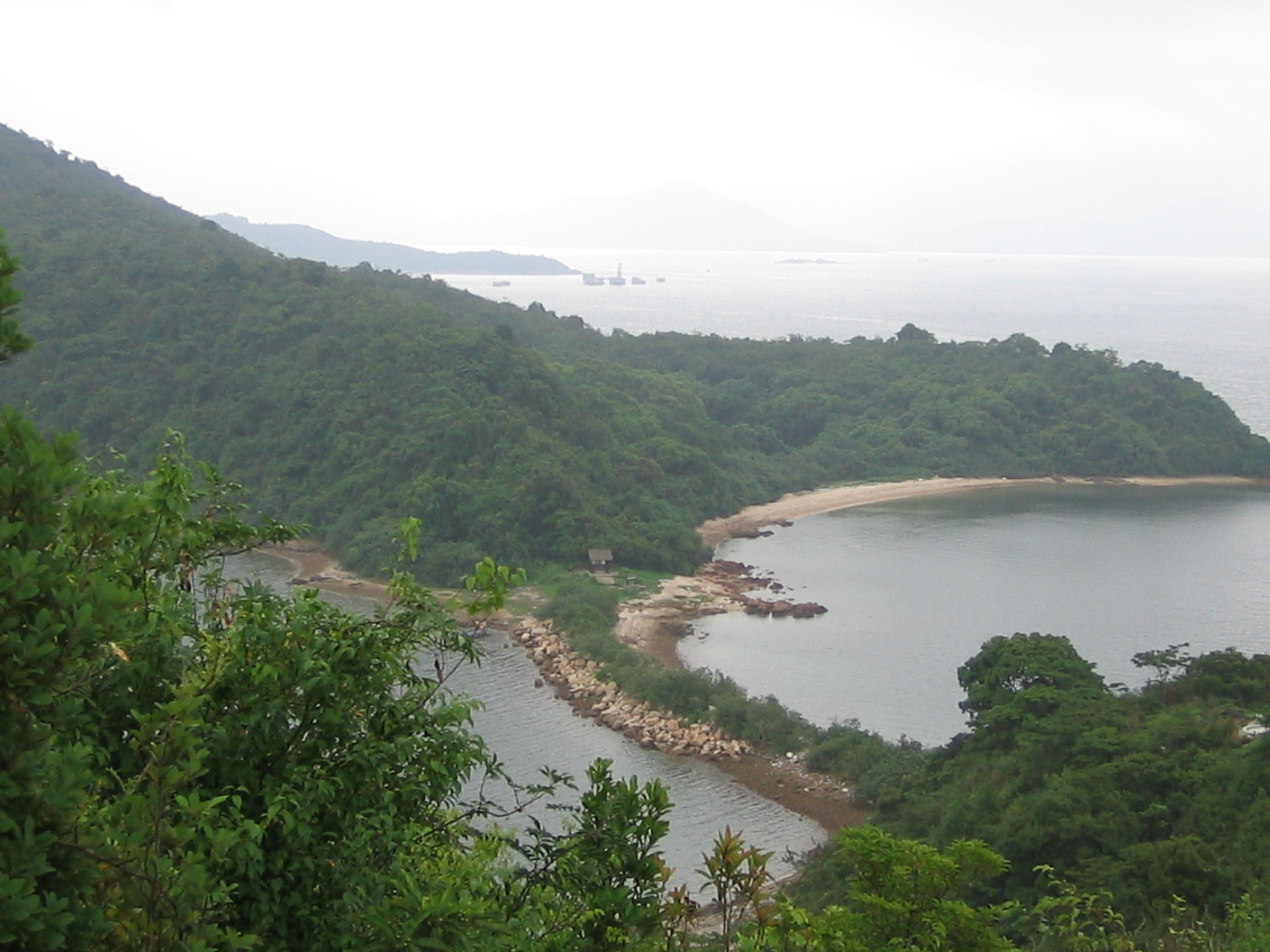
Tombolo between Yim Tin Tsai and Ma Shi Chau, viewed from Yim Tin Tsai.

Yim Tin Tsai (Chinese: 鹽田仔; lit. 'Little Salt Field') is an island of Hong Kong located in Tolo Harbour.

== Geography ==
Yim Tin Tsai is located in Tolo Harbour and forms part of the southern border of Plover Cove. It is connected to the mainland in the north by a road, leading next to The Beverly Hills, and to the island of Ma Shi Chau in the east by a tombolo that is only accessible when the tide is low. Sam Mun Tsai New Village (三門仔新村) and Luen Yick Fishermen Village (聯益漁村) are located in the north of the island. The two villages are facing the Shuen Wan Typhoon Shelter (船灣避風塘).

While Yim Tin Tsai is not part of the Ma Shi Chau Special Area, a small unnamed island located about 100 m (330 ft) northeast of its shore belongs to the Area.

== History ==
A Late Neolithic prehistoric site dating back to about 4,000 years ago has been identified on Yim Tin Tsai. Prehistoric sites have been discovered on two other islands of Tolo Harbour, namely Yuen Chau Tsai (3,000 years, Bronze Age) and Centre Island (6,000 years, Middle Neolithic Age).

Members of the Hakka Chan (陳) clan moved from today's Shenzhen and settled in Yim Tin Tsai during the 19th century. Other members of the clan settled in Yim Tin Tsai in Sai Kung and in Ping Yeung, in Ta Kwu Ling, North District. Salt fields were operated on Yim Tin Tsai at that time.

The fishermen now residing in Sam Mun Tsai New Village used to live on boats at the original Sam Mun Tsai, close to Tai Kau of Luk Heung, now at the northeastern shore of Plover Cove Reservoir. They were relocated to their current residence in 1966, as a result of the construction of the Plover Cove Reservoir. At the time, 36 families were moved to housing on land. Extensive renovation work was conducted at the Sam Mun Tsai Fishermen's Village in 2006-2007.
