= Yuen Chau Tsai =

Island in Hong Kong

Coordinates: 22.445734°N 114.178504°E

- Traditional Chinese: 元洲仔 (formerly: 圓洲仔)
Transcriptions
Yue: Cantonese
- Yale Romanization: Yùhn jāu jái
- Jyutping: Jun4 zau1 zai2

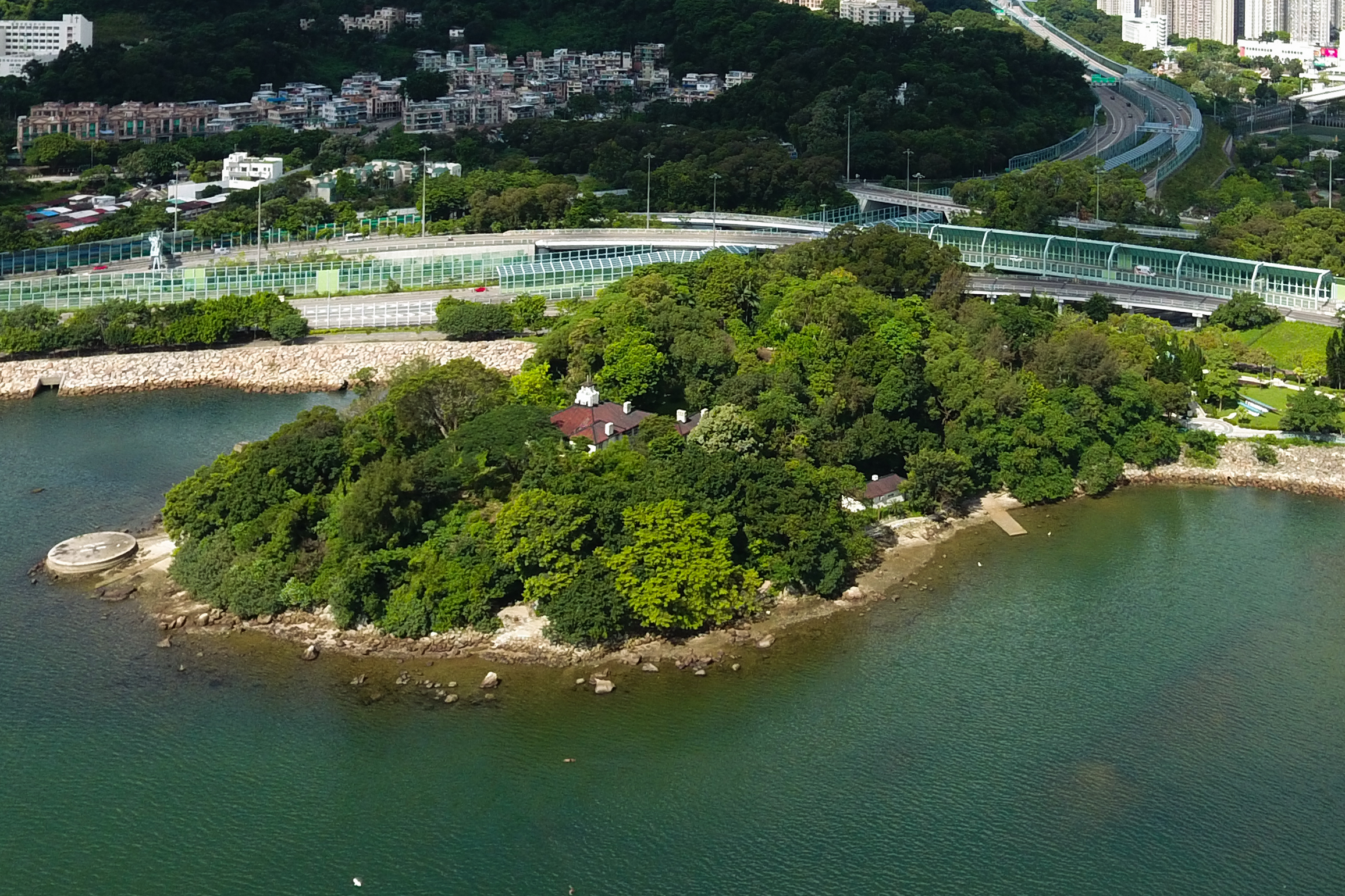
Aerial photograph of Yuen Chau Tsai.

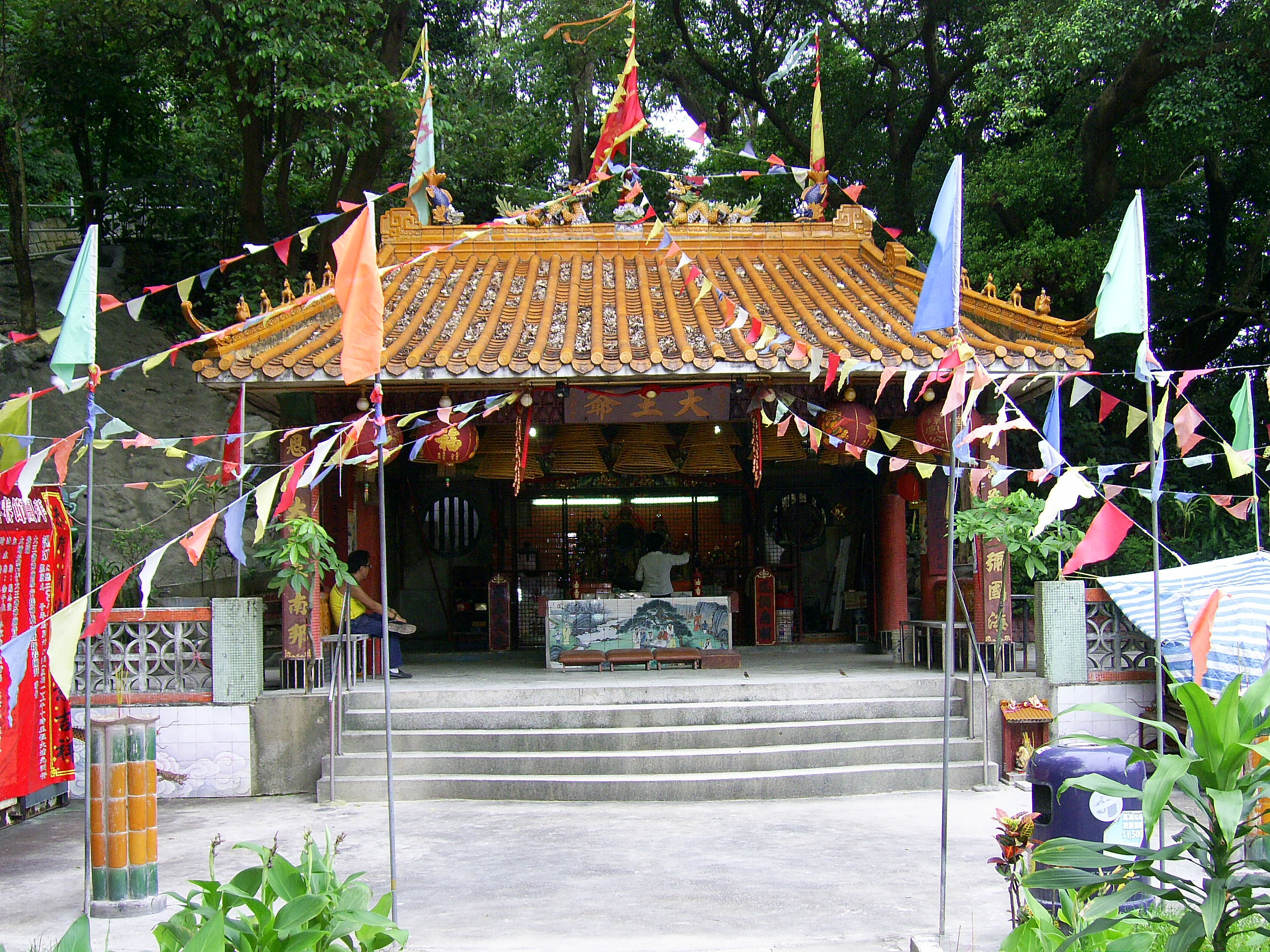
Tai Wong Yeh Temple at Yuen Chau Tsai.

Yuen Chau Tsai was an island in Tolo Harbour, Hong Kong. It is now connected to land by a causeway after land reclamation. It is part of Tai Po New Town in the Tai Po District.

The Tai Wong Yeh Temple and Island House are located in the area of the former island.

== Island House ==
Built in 1905, Island House was built as the residence for the first British Police Magistrate appointed in 1898. It is one of the declared monuments of Hong Kong.

== Tai Wong Yeh Temple ==
Tai Wong Yeh Temple (大王爺廟) is located at the Island House Interchange. The temple was originally a stone tablet which was erected on the northern shore of Yuen Chau Tsai by the villagers in Chik Mei Village, located on the north bank of the Shenzhen River, in the mid-Qing Dynasty. In the late Qing Dynasty, some fishermen raised funds to build the temple for worship by local fishermen at the present location.

In 1960, a formal launching ceremony for dragon boats was first held at the Tai Wong Yeh Temple in Yuen Chau Tsai is held on Dragon Boat Festival. The ceremony has remained a tradition since then.

An opening ceremony was held in 1988 marking its renovation.

== Yuen Chau Tsai (Island House) archaeological site ==
In 1960s, John Walden, who was the first one to report the site, collected stone adzes and geometric pottery sherds at the shoreline and the southern slope of Yuen Chau Tsai. In the 1980s and 1990s, field investigations recovered prehistoric cultural remains from the site. .
