= Tolo Harbour =

Harbour in Hong Kong

Coordinates: 22°26′50″N 114°11′17″E

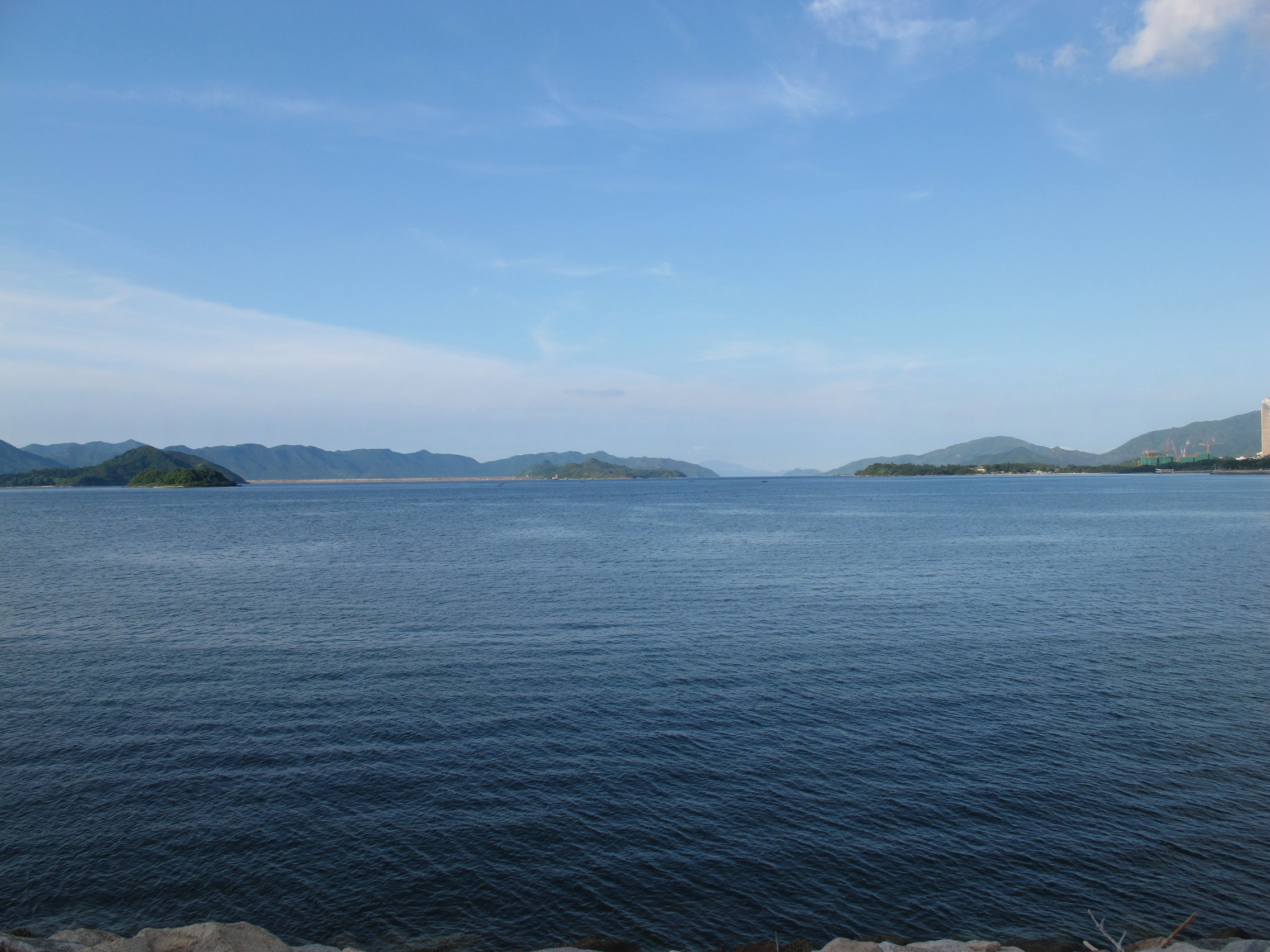
- Tolo Harbour and Pat Sin Leng (mountains)
- Chinese: 吐露港
Transcriptions
Standard Mandarin
- Hanyu Pinyin: Tùlù Gǎng
Yue: Cantonese
- Jyutping: tou3 lou5 gong2
- IPA: [tʰōu lo̬u kɔ̌ːŋ]

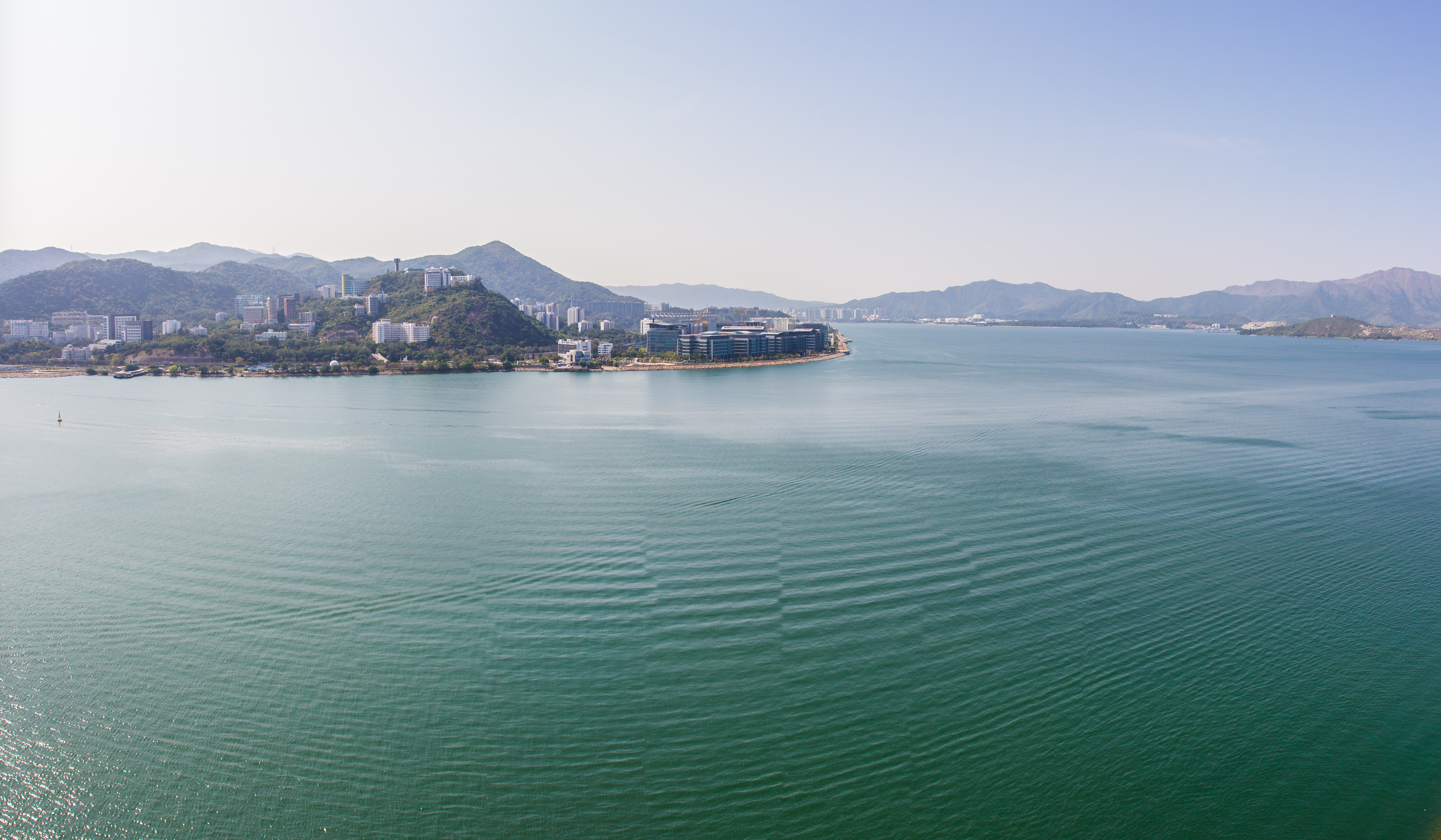
Tolo Harbour view from Ma On Shan

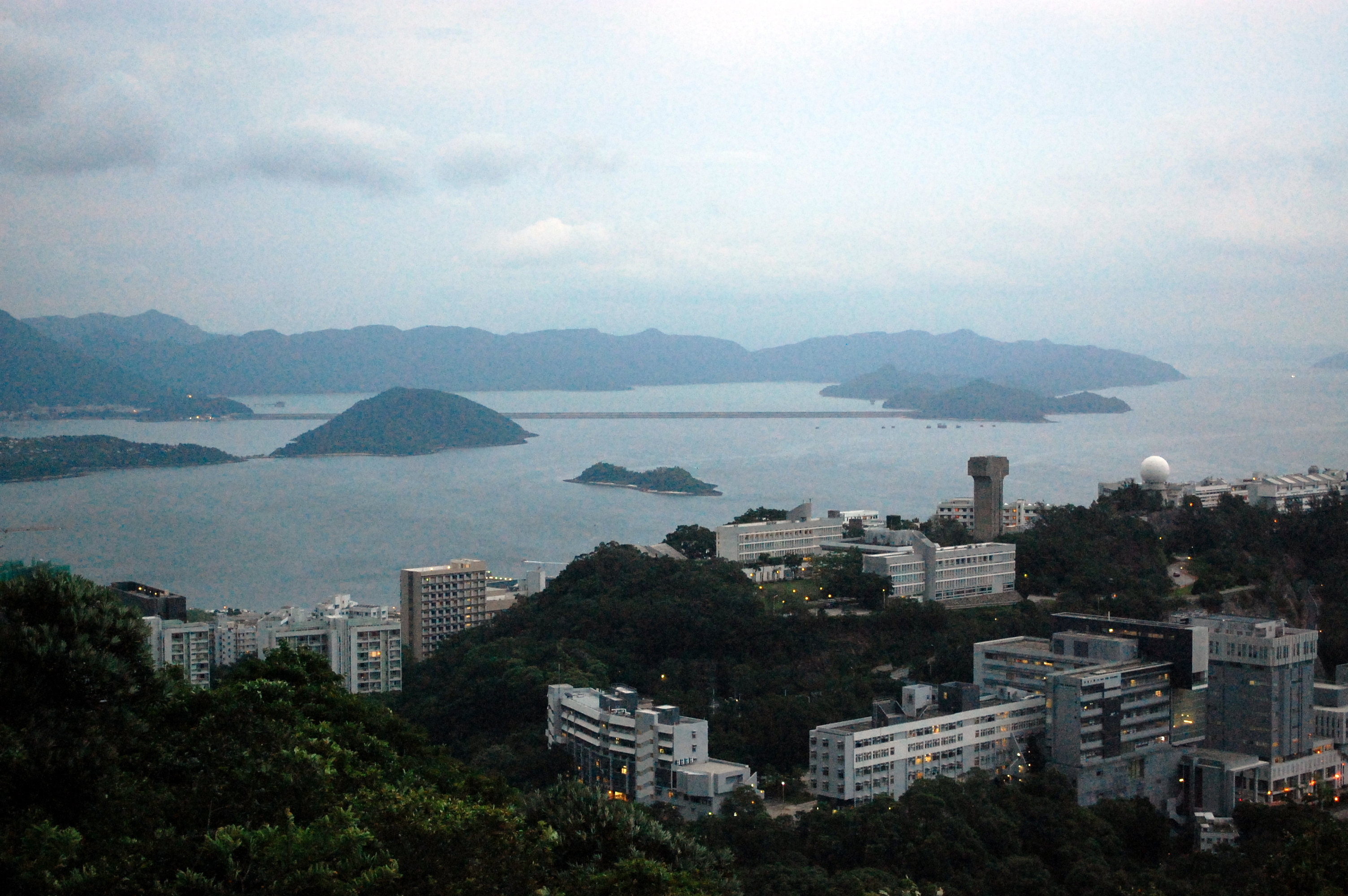
Tolo Harbour with the campus of the Chinese University of Hong Kong

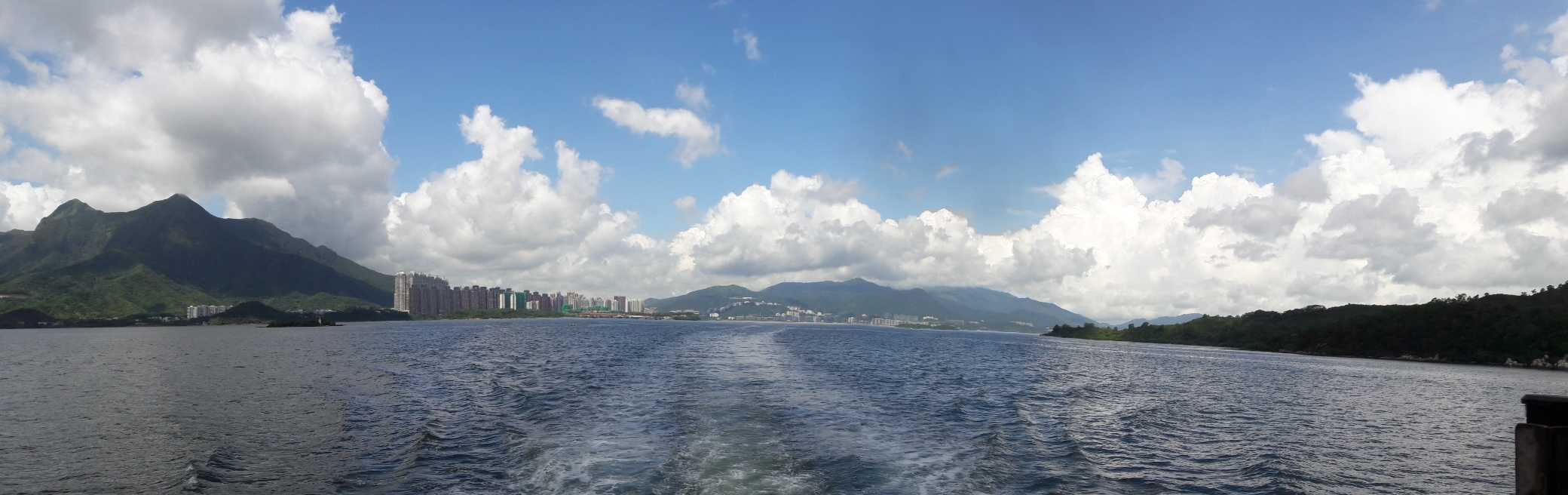
Tolo Channel towards Sha Tin

Tolo Harbour (Chinese: 吐露港), or Tai Po Hoi (大埔海, historically 大步海; 'Tai Po Sea'), is a sheltered harbour in northeast New Territories of Hong Kong.

== Geography ==
Tide Cove, also known as Sha Tin Hoi, is to the south of the harbour, and Plover Cove, Three Fathoms Cove and Tolo Channel are to its east.

The Shing Mun River empties first into Tide Cove, then the harbour.

Several islands are located in the harbour, including Ma Shi Chau, Centre Island, Yeung Chau and Yim Tin Tsai. Yuen Chau Tsai is a former island, now connected to the mainland by a causeway.

== History ==
In the past pearls were very abundant here. Pearl hunting had been a major industry in Tai Po from the Han dynasty. In the Five Dynasties and Ten Kingdoms period, a king of Southern Han changed the name of Tai Po to Mei Chuen To (媚川都) and ordered an aggressive cultivation effort, which led to many fatalities amongst the pearl hunters. The hunting lasted until the Ming dynasty, when the pearl oysters were nearly extinct in the area.

== Transportation ==
Kowloon–Canton Railway was built in the 1910s and Tolo Highway in the 1980s on its western shore.

Kaito Ferry Services across Tolo Harbour are available:

- Tai Shui Hang – Ma Liu Shui/Tai Mei Tuk
- Ma Liu Shui – Lai Chi Wo
- Ma Liu Shui – Kat O/Ap Chau
- Ma Liu Shui – Tap Mun
- Ma Liu Shui – Tung Ping Chau

== See also ==
- Ma Shi Chau Special Area
- List of harbours in Hong Kong
