= Sam Mun Tsai =

Village in Tai Po, Hong Kong

Coordinates: 22.456345°N 114.213983°E

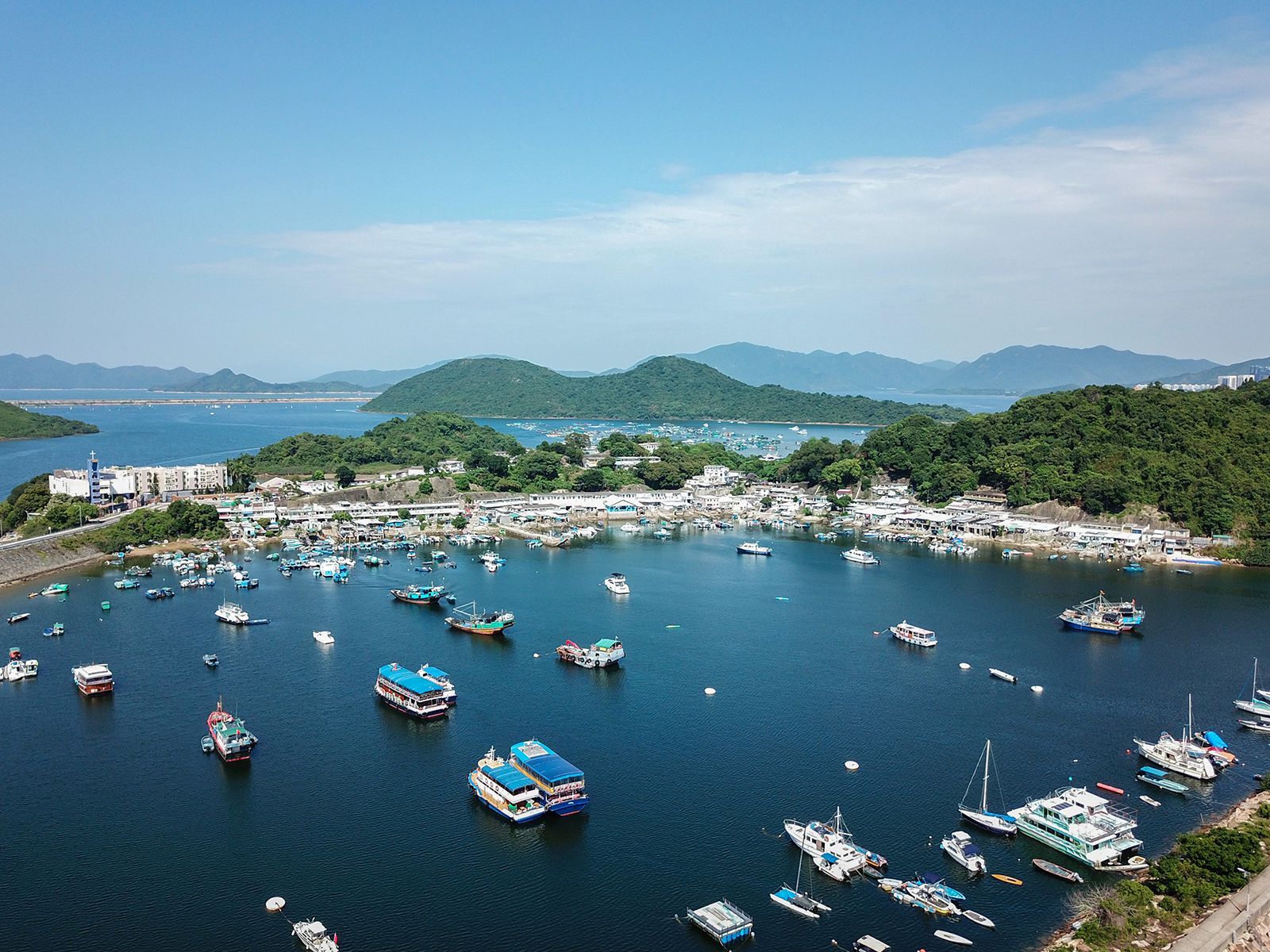
Aerial view of Sam Mun Tsai

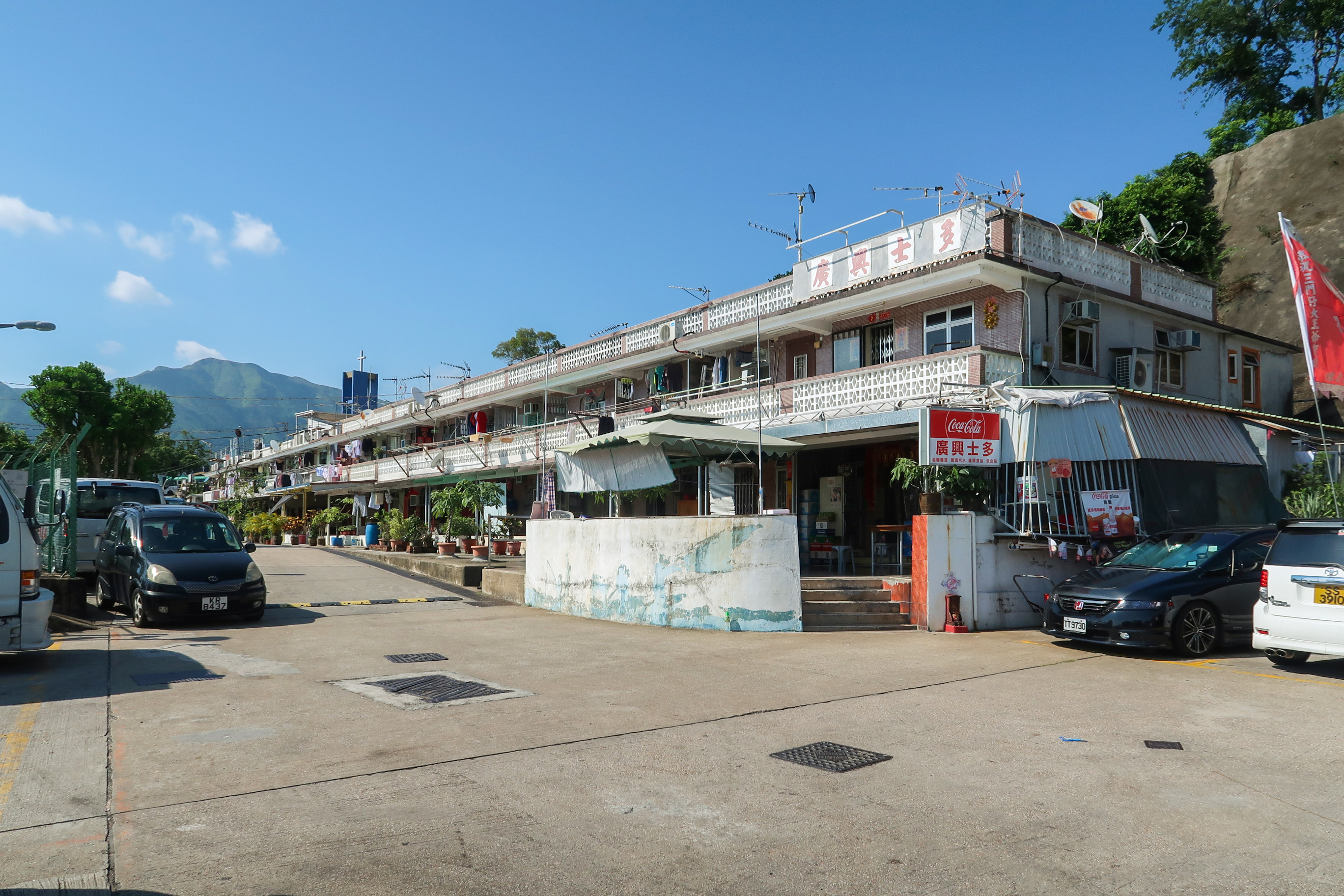
Sam Mun Tsai New Village

Sam Mun Tsai (Chinese: 三門仔) is an area and a village in Yim Tin Tsai, Tai Po District, Hong Kong.

== Administration ==
Sam Mun Tsai is one of the villages represented within the Tai Po Rural Committee. For electoral purposes, Sam Mun Tsai is part of the Shuen Wan constituency, which was formerly represented by So Tat-leung until October 2021. Sam Mun Tsai New Village or Sam Mun Tsai San Tsuen (三門仔新村) is a recognized village under the New Territories Small House Policy.

== History ==
The fishermen now residing in Sam Mun Tsai New Village used to live on boats at the original Sam Mun Tsai, close to Tai Kau of Luk Heung, now at the northeastern shore of Plover Cove Reservoir. They were relocated to their current residence in 1966, as a result of the construction of the Plover Cove Reservoir. At the time, 36 families were moved to housing on land. Extensive renovation work was conducted at the Sam Mun Tsai Fishermen's Village in 2006–2007.

== See also ==
- Fishermen villages in Hong Kong
