= Pak Hok Shan =

- 白鶴山 | 鶴嶺
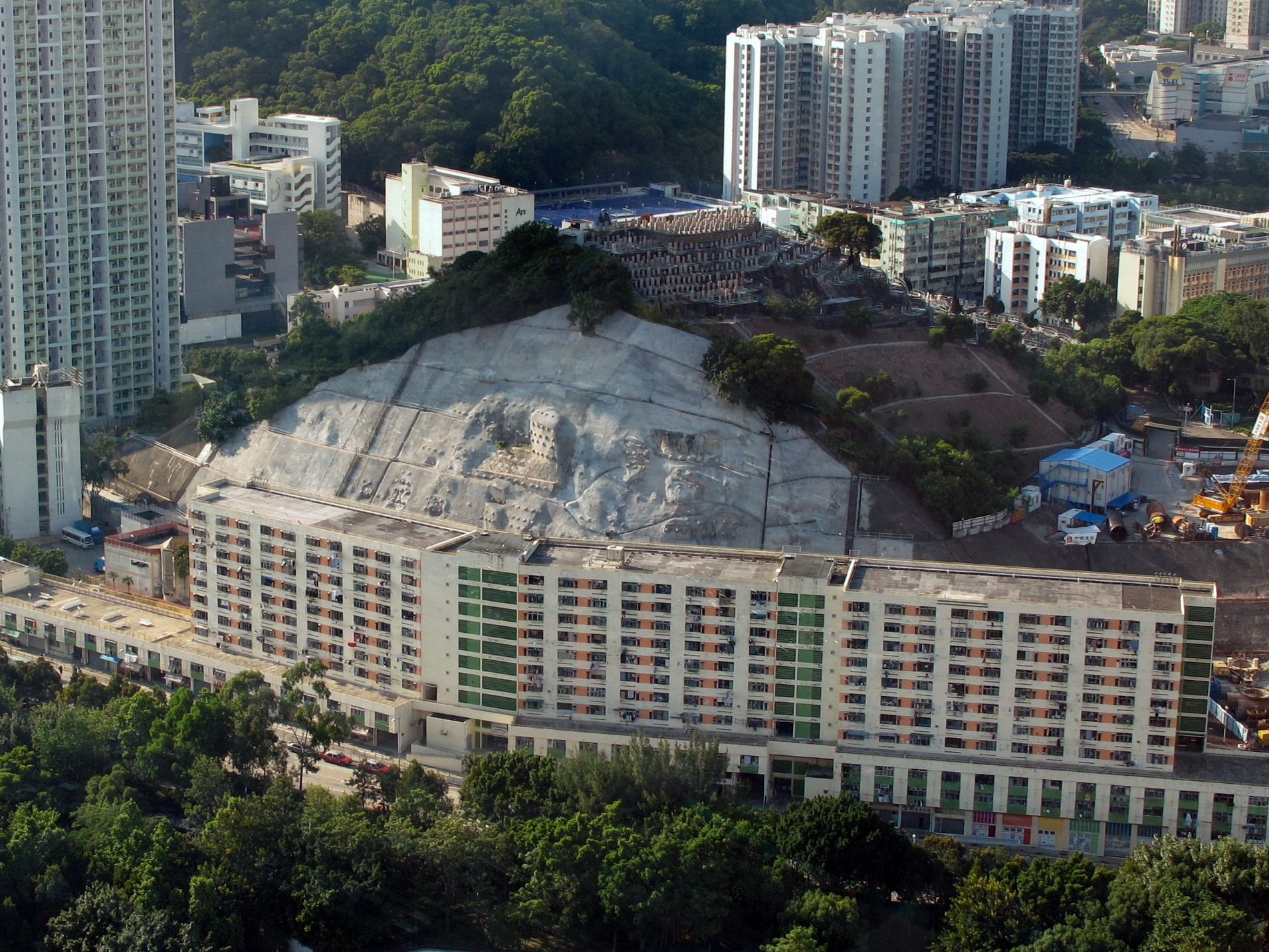
- Pak Hok Shan

Highest point
- Elevation: 77 m (253 ft)
- Coordinates: 22.333814°N 114.188889°E

Geography
- Location within Hong Kong
- Location: Hong Kong

Pak Hok Shan (Chinese: 白鶴山) is a small hill in the northern part of the New Kowloon in Hong Kong. It is 77 metres (253 ft) in height. The Hong Kong Chinese Christian Churches Union Cemetery is located on this hill.

== History ==
The hill was the site of a mine on the Kowloon Peninsula, as mining was a booming industry in the area in the 19th century. The walls of Kowloon Walled City were partly made from stones extracted from this hill.

== See also ==
- Geography of Hong Kong
- List of mountains, peaks and hills in Hong Kong
- Lion Rock
- Kai Tak Airport
