= List of mountains, peaks and hills in Hong Kong =

The following is a list of mountains, peaks and hills in Hong Kong.

In the romanisation system used by the Hong Kong Government known as Standard Romanisation, 'shan' and 'leng' are the transliterations of the Cantonese words for 'mount' (山) and 'ridge' (嶺), respectively. 'Toi', 'kong', 'fung' and 'koi' also correspond to 'mount' in English and 'teng' corresponds to 'peak'. It is this system which is used in the list below.

== Highest peaks of Hong Kong ==
Rank	Name	Height (m)	Country park	Location	Notes
1	Tai Mo Shan	957	Tai Mo Shan Country Park	Central New Territories	MacLehose Trail Section 8. The actual peak is inside an army base and not accessible to the public.
2	Lantau Peak (Fung Wong Shan)	934	Lantau South Country Park	Central Lantau Island	Highest publicly accessible summit. Lantau Trail Section 3
3	Sunset Peak (Tai Tung Shan)	869	Lantau South Country Park	Southern Lantau Island	Lantau Trail Section 2
4	Sze Fong Shan	785	Tai Mo Shan Country Park	Central New Territories	MacLehose Trail Section 8
5	Miu Ko Toi	779	Tai Mo Shan Country Park	Central New Territories	Second highest peak on Tai Mo Shan
6	Wo Yeung Shan	767	Tai Mo Shan Country Park	Central New Territories	
7	Lin Fa Shan	766	Lantau North Country Park	Central Lantau Island	Lantau Trail Section 2
8	Nei Lak Shan	754	Lantau North Country Park	Southern Lantau Island	Lantau Trail Section 3
9	Yi Tung Shan	749	Lantau North Country Park	Eastern Lantau Island	Lantau Trail Section 2
10	Ma On Shan	702	Ma On Shan Country Park	Eastern New Territories	
11	Yin Ngam Teng	679	Tai Mo Shan Country Park	Central New Territories	
12	The Hunch Backs (Ngau Ngak Shan)	677	Ma On Shan Country Park	Eastern New Territories	
13	Wo Kong Tong (lower)	656	Tai Mo Shan Country Park	Central New Territories	
14	Grassy Hill	647	Tai Mo Shan Country Park	Central New Territories	
15	Wong Leng	639	Pat Sin Leng Country Park	Northeastern New Territories	
16	Buffalo Hill	606	Ma On Shan Country Park	Eastern New Territories	
17	West Buffalo Hill	604	Ma On Shan Country Park	Eastern New Territories	
18	Kowloon Peak (Fei Ngo Shan)	603	Ma On Shan Country Park	Eastern Kowloon	
19	Shun Yeung Fung	591	Pat Sin Leng Country Park	Northeastern New Territories	Part of Pat Sin Leng.
20	Tiu Shau Ngam	589	Ma On Shan Country Park	Eastern New Territories	
21	Chau Ma Kong	588	Tai Mo Shan Country Park	Eastern New Territories	
22=	Cheung Shan	585	Ma On Shan Country Park	Eastern Kowloon	Also known as Middle Hill
22=	Lo Tin Teng	585	Lam Tsuen Country Park	Northwestern New Territories	
24	Castle Peak	583	None	Western New Territories west of Tuen Mun	Also known as Ching Shan or Pui To Shan
25	Lin Fa Shan	579	Tai Lam Country Park	Tsuen Wan District	
26	Tate's Cairn	577	Ma On Shan Country Park	Northeastern Kowloon	Also known as Tai Lo Shan.
27	Kai Kung Leng (Tai Lo Tin)	572	Lam Tsuen Country Park	Northwestern New Territories	
28	Tai To Yan	566	Lam Tsuen Country Park	Northwestern New Territories	
29	Wong Chuk Shan	560	Ma On Shan Country Park	Eastern New Territories	
30	Ngoc Yiu Chiu Tin 鱷魚朝天	559	Tai Lam Country Park	Tsuen Wan District	Not included before Nov 2023, but measured to have > 30m of prominence, an International standard for an independent mountain. In English its name is "Crocodile towards the Sky".
31=	Victoria Peak	552	Pok Fu Lam Country Park	Hong Kong Island	Named after the British monarch Queen Victoria; also known as Mount Austin (named after the former Colonial Secretary John Gardiner Austin), and locally as The Peak. The Peak was once a volcano.
31=	Kwun Yam Shan	552	Tai Mo Shan Country Park	Central New Territories	
33	Lai Pek Shan	550	Pat Sin Leng Country Park	Northeastern New Territories	
34	Tung Shan	544	Ma On Shan Country Park	Eastern Kowloon	
35	Chung Li Fung	543	Pat Sin Leng Country Park	Northeastern New Territories	Part of Pat Sin Leng.
36	Shek Nga Shan	540	Ma On Shan Country Park	Eastern New Territories	
37	Kau Nga Ling	539	Lantau South Country Park	Southern Lantau Island	
38	Pyramid Hill	536	Ma On Shan Country Park	Eastern New Territories	Also known as Tai Kam Chung.
39	Tung Yeung Shan	533	Ma On Shan Country Park	Northeastern Kowloon	
40=	Needle Hill	532	Shing Mun Country Park	Central New Territories	Also known as Cham Shan.
40=	Mount Parker	532	Tai Tam Country Park	Hong Kong Island	Named after Admiral of the Fleet Sir William Parker, 1st Baronet, of Shenstone
42=	Kao Lao Fung	530	Pat Sin Leng Country Park	Northeastern New Territories	Part of Pat Sin Leng.
42=	Kuai Li Fung	530	Pat Sin Leng Country Park	Northeastern New Territories	Part of Pat Sin Leng.
44=	Pok To Yan	529	Lantau South Country Park	Southern Lantau Island	
44=	Ping Fung Shan 屏風山	529	Pat Sin Leng Country Park	Northeastern New Territories	
46	Fu Yung Pit	515	Ma On Shan Country Park	Northeastern Kowloon	
47	Hsien Ku Fung	514	Pat Sin Leng Country Park	Northeastern New Territories	Part of Pat Sin Leng
48=	Sheung Tsz Fung	510	Pat Sin Leng Country Park	Northeastern New Territories	Part of Pat Sin Leng
48=	Tsao Kau Fung	510	Pat Sin Leng Country Park	Northeastern New Territories	Part of Pat Sin Leng
50	Kau Keng Shan	507	Tai Lam Country Park	Western New Territories	
51	Luk Ngo Leng 轆牛嶺	503	Tai Lam Country Park	Tsuen Wan District	Not included before Nov 2023, but measured to have > 80m of prominence, more than the 30m International standard for an independent mountain.
52	Mount Kellett	501	Aberdeen Country Park	Hong Kong Island	Named after Admiral Sir Henry Kellett
53	Lion Rock	495	Lion Rock Country Park	Northern Kowloon	
54	High West	494	Pok Fu Lam Country Park	Hong Kong Island	
55	Sze Tse Tau Shan	494	Lantau South Country Park	Southern Lantau Island	
56	Robin's Nest	492	Robin's Nest Country Park	Northern New Territories	Also known as Hung Fa Leng ('Red Flower Ridge').
57	Ling Wui Shan	490	Lantau South Country Park	Lantau Island	
58=	Choi Wo Fung	489	Pat Sin Leng Country Park	Northeastern New Territories	Part of Pat Sin Leng.
58=	Hung Fa Chai	489	Robin's Nest Country Park	Northeastern New Territories	Also known on old Admiralty charts as Ben Nevis.
60	Temple Hill	488	Lion Rock Country Park	line of mountains dividing Sha Tin from Kowloon	Also known as Tsz Wan Shan.
61	Kwai Tau Leng	486	Pat Sin Leng Country Park	Northeastern New Territories	
62	Por Kai Shan	482	Lantau North Country Park	southeast of Tung Chung and facing Urmston Road	
63	Shek Uk Shan	481	Sai Kung West Country Park	Sai Kung, New Territories	
64	Pak Tai To Yan	480	Lam Tsuen Country Park	Northwestern New Territories	
65=	Muk Yue Shan	479	Lantau North Country Park	Lantau Island, north side of Shek Pik Reservoir	
65=	Mount Gough	479		Hong Kong Island east of Victoria Peak and north of Aberdeen Country Park	Named for Field Marshal Hugh Gough, 1st Viscount Gough British Commander-in-Chief, China and Commander-in-Chief, India
67	Shek Lung Kung	473	Tai Lam Country Park	Near Ting Kau and south of Hoi Pui Reservoir	
68	Sharp Peak (Nam She Tsim)	468	Sai Kung East Country Park		
69	Tai Hom Sham	466	Lantau South Country Park		
70	Lo Fu Tau	465	Lantau North Country Park		
71	Tin Fu Tsai Shan	461	Tai Lam Country Park	Near Ting Kau	
72	Keung Shan	459	Lantau South Country Park	North of Tai Long Wan Tsuen	
73	Beacon Hill	457	Lion Rock Country Park		
74	Shek Lung Tsai 獨本舟右 or 石壟仔	454	Ma On Shan Country Park		
75	Ngam Tau Shan	451	Sai Kung West Country Park		
76	Cheung Shan	449		Lantau Island	
77	Cheung Yan Shan	443		Lantau Island	
78	Cloudy Hill (Kau Lung Hang Shan)	440	Pat Sin Leng Country Park	Central New Territories, North of Hong Lok Yuen and Tai Po Industrial Estate	
79 =	Mount Cameron	439	Aberdeen Country Park	Hong Kong Island	Likely to be named for Major General William Gordon Cameron British Army officer and former Administrator of Hong Kong
79 =	Yi Tung 二峒	439	Robin's Nest Country Park	Northern New Territories	This was omitted from the legacy list. It has a prominence of > 40m so is an independent mountain.
81	Unicorn Ridge	437	Lion Rock Country Park	Line of mountains dividing Sha Tin and Kowloon	
82 =	Mount Butler	436	Tai Tam Country Park	Hong Kong Island	
82 =	Sam Tung 三峒	436	Robin's Nest Country Park	Northern New Territories	This was omitted from the legacy list. It has a prominence of ~ 34m so is an independent mountain.
84	Kwun Yam Shan	434		Lantau Island	
85	Violet Hill (Tsz Lo Lan Shan)	433	Tai Tam Country Park	Hong Kong Island	
86	Jardine's Lookout	433	Tai Tam Country Park		Named for British merchant William Jardine and Hong Jardine Matheson
87	Razor Hill (Che Kwu Shan)	432		Near Pik Uk, Ta Ku Ling, Tseung Kwan O, and Tai Po Tsai	
88	Mount Nicholson	430		Hong Kong Island	Likely named for Hong Kong Volunteer Corps Adjutant Lieutenant W.C.A. Nicholson
89	Sham Hang Lek	430		Lantau Island	
90	Middle Kau Nga Ling	428		Lantau Island	
91	Siu Ma Shan	424		Hong Kong Island	
92	Ngau Yee Shek Shan	422	Sai Kung West Country Park		
93	Tiu Tang Lung	416	Plover Cove Country Park		
94	Luk Chau Shan	414	Ma On Shan Country Park		
95	Man Tau Tun 饅頭墩	413	Lion Rock Country Park	line of mountains dividing Sha Tin from Kowloon	
96	Cham Tin Shan	411	Ma On Shan Country Park	North of Ngau Chi Wan	
97	Pai Ngak Shan	409	Sai Kung Easy Country Park	North of High Island Reservoir	
98	Tai Cham Koi	408	Sai Kung East Country Park	North of High Island Reservoir	
99	Luk Shan	407		Near the Tai Po Kau Nature Reserve	
100=	Tai Sheung Tok	399	Ma On Shan Country Park	Near Ngau Chi Wan	
100=	Kai Kung Shan	399	Sai Kung West Country Park		
102=	Kau To Shan (Cove Hill)	399		East of Shing Mun Country Park and south of Tai Po Kau in Sha Tin	
102=	Nui Po Shan (Turret Hill)	399	Ma On Shan Country Park	Near Sha Tin	
104	Tsim Mei Fung	395	Ma On Shan Country Park		
105	Kon Shan	394			
106	Wa Mei Shan	391	Sai Kung West Country Park		
107	The Twins South	386		Hong Kong Island	
108	Lui Ta Shek	379	Sai Kung West Country Park		
109	Lau Fa Tung	378		Lantau Island	
110	Yuen Tau Shan	375		Near Tuen Mun	
111=	Nga Ying Shan	374		Lantau Island	
111=	Kai Kung Shan	374	Lam Tsuen Country Park		
113	Mount Hallowers (Tam Chai Shan)	372	Sai Kung West Country Park		
114	Tai Mun Shan	370		Near Big Wave Bay (aka. Tai Long Wan Near Chek King on the Sai Kung Peninsula)	
115=	Golden Hill (Kam Shan)	369	Kam Shan Country Park		
115=	Fan Kei Tok	369	Plover Cove Country Park		
117	Tin Mei Shan	366	Sai Kung East Country Park	Northwest corner of High Island Reservoir	
118	The Twins North	363		Hong Kong Island	
119	Bird's Hill (Lung Shan)	360		Near Pat Sin Leng Country Park and Kwan Tei Temple	
120	Mount Stenhouse (Shan Tel Tong)	353		Lamma Island	likely named for Edinburgh suburb Stenhouse Village
121	Mount Collinson	348		Hong Kong Island	Colonel Thomas Bernard Collinson, a Royal Engineers surveyor in Hong Kong (1821–1902)
122	Hebe Hill (Tsim Fung Shan)	346	Ma On Shan Country Park		
123=	High Junk Peak (Tiu Yue Yung)	344	Clear Water Bay Country Park		
123=	Cheung Lin Shan	344		Hong Kong Island	
125	Tsim Fung Shan	339		Lantau Island	
126	Shek Sze Shan	338		Lantau Island	
127	Smuggler's Ridge	337	Kam Shan Country Park	Part of Gin Drinker's Line	
128	Tsing Yi Peak (Sam Chi Heung)	334		Tsing Yi Island	
129	Miu Tsai Tun	333		Clearwater Bay	
130	D'Aguilar Peak (Hok Tsui Shan)	325	Shek O Country Park	Shek O	British Army Major-General George Charles D'Aguilar, Lieutenant Governor of Hong Kong
131	Wo Liu Tun	324		Lantau Island	
132	Sze Shan	322		Lantau Island	
133	Tai Tun	317	Sai Kung West Country Park		
134	Sai Wan Shan	314	Sai Kung East Country Park	Facing High Island Reservoir	
135=	Pottinger Peak	312		Hong Kong Island	Sir Henry Pottinger, first British Governor of Hong Kong and East India Company Colonel
135=	Kwai Au Shan	312	Ma On Shan Country Park	South of Hebe Hill and north east of Ngau Tau Kok	
137	Eagle's Nest (Tsim Shan)	305		Near Kam Shan Country Park	
138	Black Hill	304		Located between Yau Tong and Tiu Keng Leng facing Junk Bay	Named for former administrator Major General Wilsone Black, British Army officer
139=	Lo Yan Shan	303		Lantau Island	
139=	Mount Newland	303	Plover Cove Country Park	Kwun Yam Tung	
141=	Tai Che Tung	302		Lantau Island	
141=	Tap Chai Shan	302		Lantau Island	Otherwise known as Temple Crag
143	Wai Mei Leng	300	Plover Cove Country Park		

=== Lesser Hills ===
There are numerous smaller hills that dot Hong Kong and some that have disappeared with re-development:

Name	Height (m)	Country park	Location	Notes
Amah Rock	251	Lion Rock		Named after Mazu (goddess). Not a hill, but a rock at the top of a hill. The rock itself is about 15 metres tall.
Mount Davis	269		Kennedy Town	Named for John Francis Davis, 2nd Governor of Hong Kong
Chiu Keng Wan Shan	247		Between Yau Tong and Tiu Keng Leng	
Devil's Peak	222		Lei Yue Mun	
Braemar Hill	200		North Point	
Leighton Hill	< 100		Causeway Bay and Happy Valley	
Morrison Hill	< 100		Wan Chai	Named for John Robert Morrison, Chinese interpreter and British linguist and Colonial Secretary. The hill was levelled Praya at the time of the Praya East Reclamation Scheme in the 1920s, which used its constituent rock/earth to reclaim land from the harbour, extending the shoreline away from the area.
Mount Parish			Causeway Bay and Happy Valley	Named for Commodore John E. Parish, Officer Commanding of China Station 1873–1876

== Volcanoes ==
- Tai Mo Shan
- High Island Supervolcano
- Kwun Yam Shan, Lam Tsuen

== Removed hills ==
- Cheung Pei Shan
- Sacred Hill
- Caroline Hill

== See also ==
- Geography of Hong Kong
- Mountain Search and Rescue Company
