= Shek Uk Shan =

Mountain in Hong Kong

- 石屋山
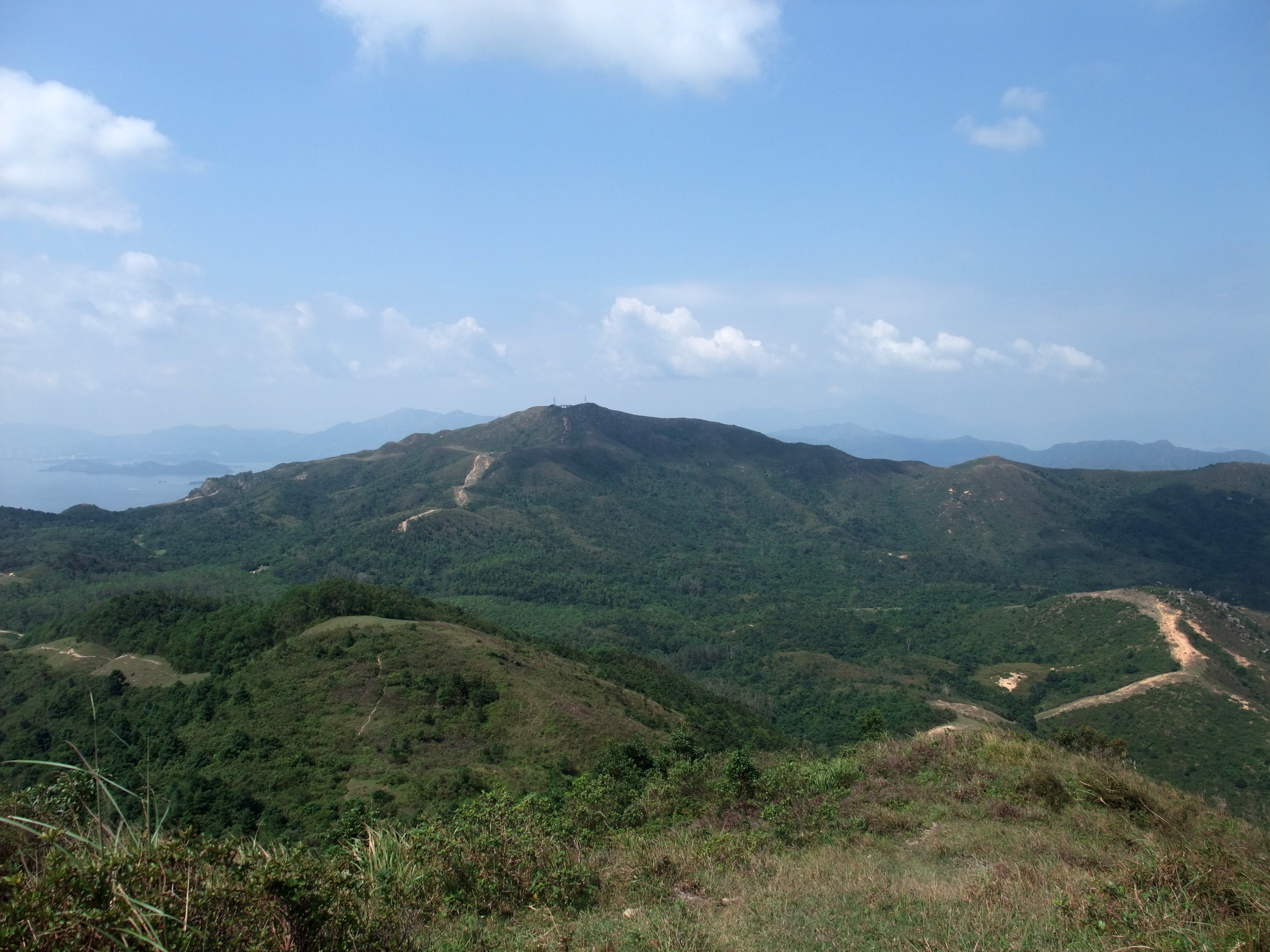
- View of Shek Uk Shan from Ngam Tau Shan

Highest point
- Elevation: 481 m (1,578 ft)
- Coordinates: 22°26′10.93″N 114°18′23.57″E

Geography
- Location within Hong Kong
- Location: Hong Kong
- District: Tai Po District

Shek Uk Shan (Chinese: 石屋山) is the highest mountain (481 metres) in Sai Kung Peninsula, Hong Kong. A signal (radio) station is located by the top of the peak.

== See also ==
- List of mountains, peaks and hills in Hong Kong
- Sai Kung Peninsula
- Sharp Peak
