= Geography of Hong Kong =

Hong Kong is located on the southern coast of China. Its territories can generally be divided into three areas: Hong Kong Island, the Kowloon Peninsula, and the New Territories, the last of which includes 263 outlying islands. (Note: The term "islands" refers to landmasses with an area of more than 500 square metres, according to the Survey and Mapping Office of the Lands Department.) Geographically, the outlying islands, including Lantau Island, are sometimes but not often regarded as a separate geographical region. The territory's mountainous terrain makes most land unsuitable for human habitation, restricting urban development primarily to coastal plains and reclaimed land. Victoria Harbour, the deep natural harbour separating Hong Kong Island from the Kowloon Peninsula, remains central to the territory's identity as an international port and a global trading hub.

The territory began as Hong Kong Island in 1842 under the Treaty of Nanking, with a land area of roughly 75 km^{2} (29 sq mi). The Convention of Peking in 1860 added the Kowloon Peninsula with 15.7 km^{2} (6.1 sq mi) of land, followed by the New Territories and outlying islands in 1898 via the Convention for the Extension of Hong Kong Territory. This final lease expanded the colony tenfold, bringing the total land area to roughly 1,009 km^{2} (390 sq mi). From the 1960s, extensive land reclamation, high-rise construction, and new town developments accommodated rapid urban growth while preserving vast tracts of mountainous countryside as nature reserves. By the handover in 1997, Hong Kong's land area reached 1,076 km^{2} (415 sq mi). Today, over seven million people reside within just over 1,114 km^{2} (430 sq mi) of land, making it one of the world's most densely populated territories.

== Physical geography ==
Hong Kong borders Guangdong Province to the north, lies west of the Pearl River estuary and Macau, and faces the South China Sea to the south. The territory extends between approximately 22°08′ and 22°35′ north latitude and 113°49′ and 114°31′ east longitude. Hong Kong observes Hong Kong Time (UTC+8), eight hours ahead of Coordinated Universal Time. To the north, Hong Kong is separated from Shenzhen, Guangdong Province, by the Shenzhen River and Sha Tau Kok River, while its southern waters adjoin the Wanshan Archipelago of Zhuhai. As of October 2025, Hong Kong has a land area of 1,114.57 km² and a total area, including inland and territorial waters, of 2,754.97 km². Of the land area, approximately 78.42 km² has been created through land reclamation.

== Geology ==
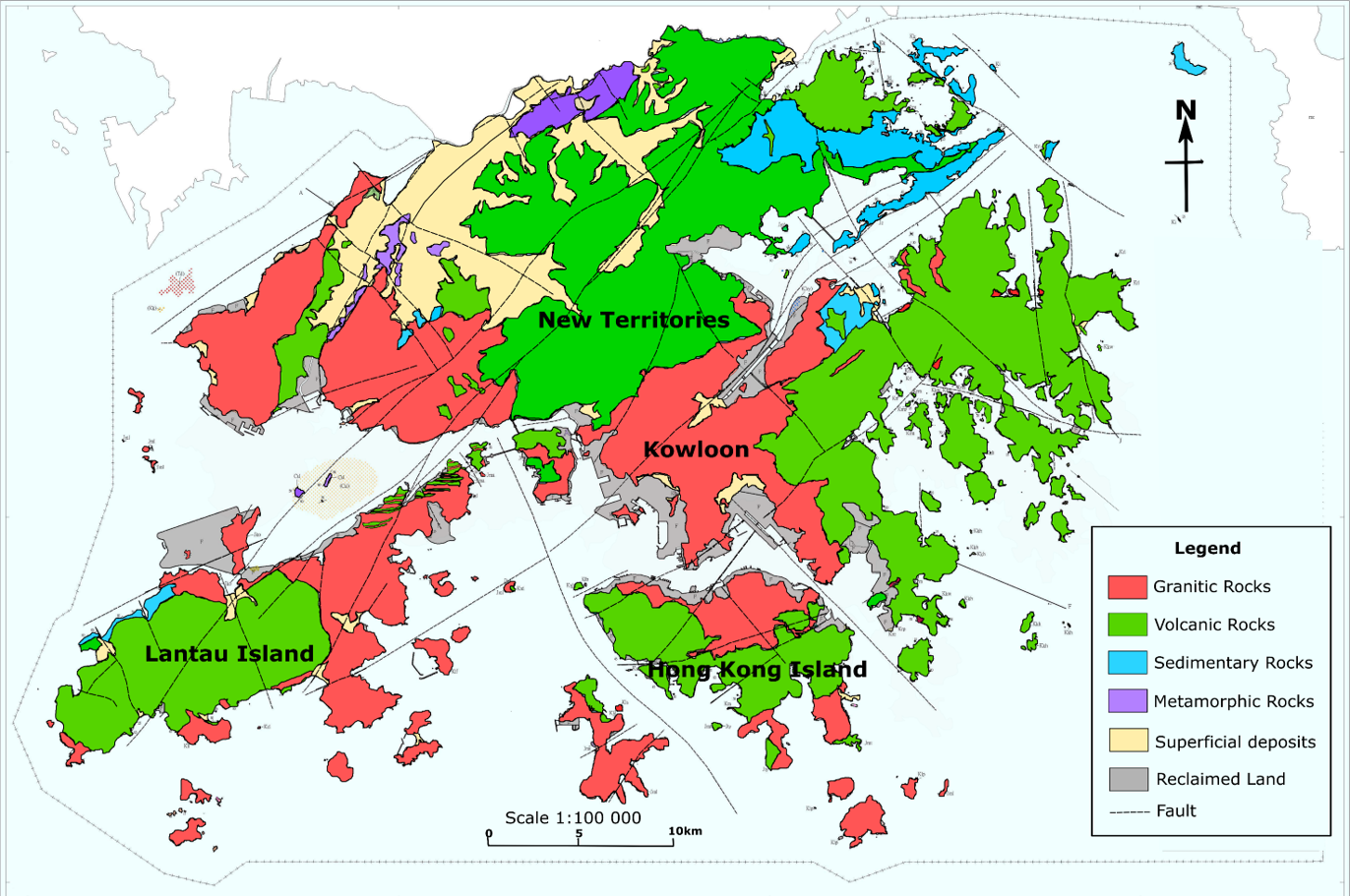
Geological map of Hong Kong showing the distribution of faults and different rock types in Hong Kong. Modified from Civil Engineering Development Department, HKSAR.

The geology of Hong Kong is dominated by igneous rocks (including granitic rocks and volcanic rocks) formed during a major volcanic eruption period in the Mesozoic era. It makes up 85% of Hong Kong's land surface, and the remaining 15% are mostly sedimentary rocks located in the northeastern New Territories. There is also a very small percentage (<1%) of metamorphic rocks within the New Territories, formed by deformation of pre-existing sedimentary rocks (metamorphism).

The geological history of Hong Kong started as early as the Devonian period (~420 Mya) which is marked by the discovery of fragmentary placoderm (a Devonian fish) fossils in northeast Hong Kong. While the youngest rocks in Hong Kong were formed during the Paleogene period(~50 Mya). They are today exposed in Tung Ping Chau in northeastern Hong Kong.

Each of the three types of rocks— igneous, sedimentary, and metamorphic— form spectacular geological features in Hong Kong. Igneous rock forms the hexagonal columns in Sai Kung, sedimentary rock forms various erosional landforms such as wave-cut platforms and sea stacks in Tung Ping Chau, and metamorphic rock forms the iron ore deposits in Ma On Shan.

In terms of structural geology, faults in Hong Kong mainly run from the northeast to the southwest. Deformation features such as sheared rocks, folds, and faulted rocks can be found near major faults, such as the banks of the Tolo Channel. Past fault activity can be observed in some structures such as the Lantau dyke swarm, deformed caldera, etc.

== Climate ==
Hong Kong's climate is subtropical and monsoonal (Köppen: Cwa), with cool dry winters and hot and wet summers. As of 2006, its annual average rainfall is 2,214 mm (87.2 in), though about 80% of the rain falls between May and September. It is occasionally affected by tropical cyclones between May and November, most often from July to September. The mean temperature of Hong Kong ranges from 17 °C (62.6 °F) in January and February to 29 °C (84.2 °F) in July and August.

January and February are cloudier, with occasional cold fronts followed by dry northerly winds. It is not uncommon for temperatures to drop below 10 °C (50 °F) in urban areas. Sub-zero temperatures and frost occur at times on high ground and in the New Territories. March and April can be pleasant although there are occasional spells of high humidity. Fog and drizzle are common on high ground which is exposed to the southeast. May to August are hot and humid with occasional showers and thunderstorms. Afternoon temperatures often exceed 31 °C (87.8 °F) whereas at night, temperatures generally remain around 26 °C (78.8 °F) with high humidity. In November and December there are pleasant breezes, plenty of sunshine and comfortable temperatures.

Climate data for Hong Kong (Hong Kong Observatory), normals 1991–2020, (Note: Mean monthly maxima and minima (i.e., the expected highest and lowest temperature readings at any point during the year or given month) calculated based on data in Hong Kong from 1991 to 2020.) extremes 1884–1939 and 1947–present
Month	Jan	Feb	Mar	Apr	May	Jun	Jul	Aug	Sep	Oct	Nov	Dec	Year
Record high °C (°F)	26.9 (80.4)	28.3 (82.9)	31.5 (88.7)	33.4 (92.1)	36.1 (97.0)	35.6 (96.1)	36.1 (97.0)	36.6 (97.9)	35.9 (96.6)	34.6 (94.3)	31.8 (89.2)	28.7 (83.7)	36.6 (97.9)
Mean maximum °C (°F)	24.0 (75.2)	25.1 (77.2)	27.5 (81.5)	30.2 (86.4)	32.3 (90.1)	33.6 (92.5)	34.1 (93.4)	34.2 (93.6)	33.4 (92.1)	31.3 (88.3)	28.4 (83.1)	25.1 (77.2)	34.7 (94.5)
Mean daily maximum °C (°F)	18.7 (65.7)	19.4 (66.9)	21.9 (71.4)	25.6 (78.1)	28.8 (83.8)	30.7 (87.3)	31.6 (88.9)	31.3 (88.3)	30.5 (86.9)	28.1 (82.6)	24.5 (76.1)	20.4 (68.7)	26.0 (78.8)
Daily mean °C (°F)	16.5 (61.7)	17.1 (62.8)	19.5 (67.1)	23.0 (73.4)	26.3 (79.3)	28.3 (82.9)	28.9 (84.0)	28.7 (83.7)	27.9 (82.2)	25.7 (78.3)	22.2 (72.0)	18.2 (64.8)	23.5 (74.3)
Mean daily minimum °C (°F)	14.6 (58.3)	15.3 (59.5)	17.6 (63.7)	21.1 (70.0)	24.5 (76.1)	26.5 (79.7)	26.9 (80.4)	26.7 (80.1)	26.1 (79.0)	23.9 (75.0)	20.3 (68.5)	16.2 (61.2)	21.6 (70.9)
Mean minimum °C (°F)	9.1 (48.4)	10.2 (50.4)	12.2 (54.0)	16.3 (61.3)	20.7 (69.3)	23.6 (74.5)	24.2 (75.6)	24.3 (75.7)	23.5 (74.3)	20.1 (68.2)	15.3 (59.5)	10.1 (50.2)	7.8 (46.0)
Record low °C (°F)	0.0 (32.0)	2.4 (36.3)	4.8 (40.6)	9.9 (49.8)	15.4 (59.7)	19.2 (66.6)	21.7 (71.1)	21.6 (70.9)	18.4 (65.1)	13.5 (56.3)	6.5 (43.7)	4.3 (39.7)	0.0 (32.0)
Average rainfall mm (inches)	33.2 (1.31)	38.9 (1.53)	75.3 (2.96)	153.0 (6.02)	290.6 (11.44)	491.5 (19.35)	385.8 (15.19)	453.2 (17.84)	321.4 (12.65)	120.3 (4.74)	39.3 (1.55)	28.8 (1.13)	2,431.2 (95.72)
Average rainy days (≥ 0.1 mm)	5.70	7.97	10.50	11.37	15.37	19.33	18.43	17.50	14.90	7.83	5.70	5.30	139.90
Average relative humidity (%)	74	79	82	83	83	82	81	81	78	73	72	70	78
Average dew point °C (°F)	11.7 (53.1)	13.2 (55.8)	16.1 (61.0)	19.7 (67.5)	23.0 (73.4)	24.9 (76.8)	25.2 (77.4)	25.1 (77.2)	23.6 (74.5)	20.2 (68.4)	16.7 (62.1)	12.4 (54.3)	19.3 (66.7)
Mean monthly sunshine hours	145.8	101.7	100.0	113.2	138.8	144.3	197.3	182.1	174.4	197.8	172.3	161.6	1,829.3
Percentage possible sunshine	43	32	27	30	34	36	48	46	47	55	52	48	41
Source: Hong Kong Observatory

== Administrative geography ==
18 districts: 1 Islands; 2 Kwai Tsing; 3 North; 4 Sai Kung; 5 Sha Tin; 6 Tai Po; 7 Tsuen Wan; 8 Tuen Mun; 9 Yuen Long; 10 Kowloon City; 11 Kwun Tong; 12 Sham Shui Po; 13 Wong Tai Sin; 14 Yau Tsim Mong; 15 Central & Western; 16 Eastern; 17 Southern; 18 Wan Chai

The Hong Kong Special Administrative Region (HKSAR), can be divided into three geographical regions: Hong Kong Island, Kowloon (including the New Kowloon), and the New Territories (including the Outlying Islands). The present-day boundaries were defined by the Memorandum of Understanding Concerning the Boundary of Administration between Hong Kong and Guangdong (粵港邊界管理範圍線諒解備忘錄), signed by the Guangdong and Hong Kong governments on 19 June 1997, and promulgated by State Council Order No. 221.

In 1982, the government introduced the District Administration Scheme, dividing Hong Kong into 18 districts to facilitate the coordination and management of public services and facilities at the local level, while encouraging public participation in district affairs. This system remains in use today, and the boundaries of the 18 districts have remained largely unchanged. The districts are currently grouped as follows:

Urban areas			New Territories	
Hong Kong Island	West Kowloon	East Kowloon	New Territories East	New Territories West
Central and Western District; Eastern District; Southern District; Wan Chai District	Kowloon City District; Sham Shui Po District; Yau Tsim Mong District	Wong Tai Sin District; Kwun Tong District	North District; Sai Kung District; Sha Tin District; Tai Po District	Islands District; Kwai Tsing District; Tsuen Wan District; Tuen Mun District; Yuen Long District

== Geographical information ==
=== Location ===
Satellite Image of Hong Kong

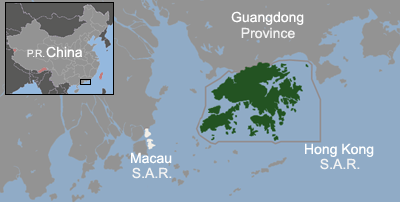
Location of Hong Kong with respect to the Pearl River Delta

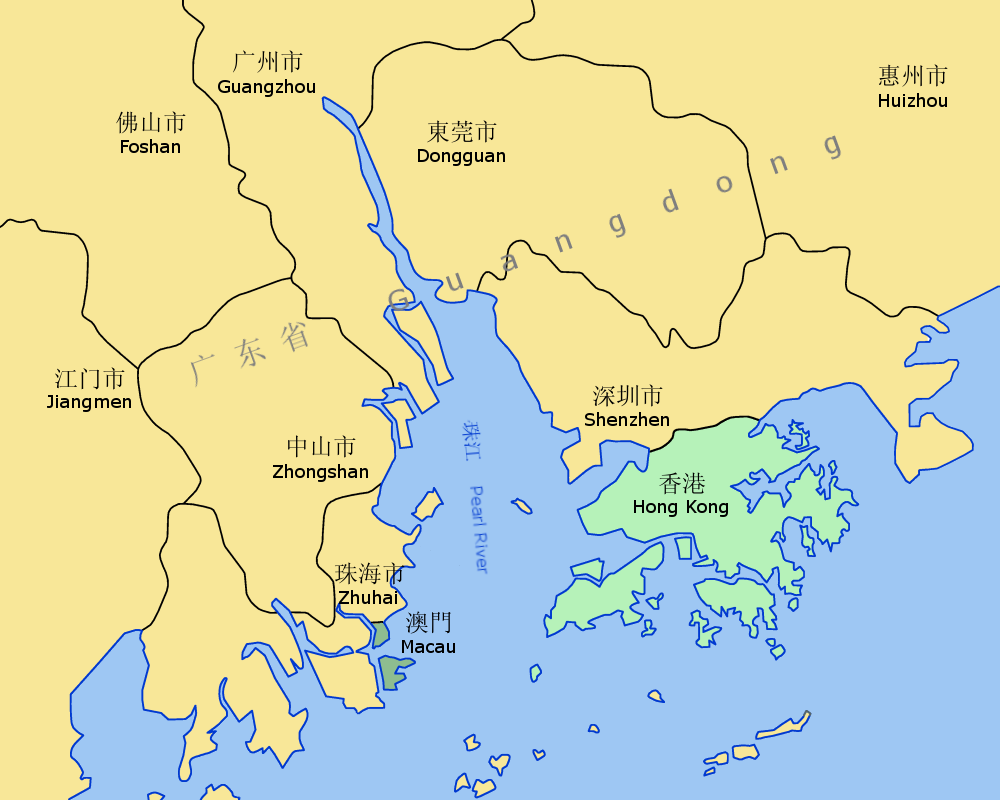
Map showing Hong Kong and surrounding cities

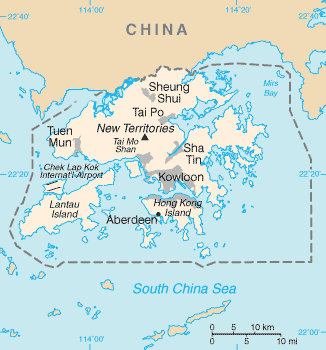
Hong Kong borders the city of Shenzhen in Guangdong Province (1954)

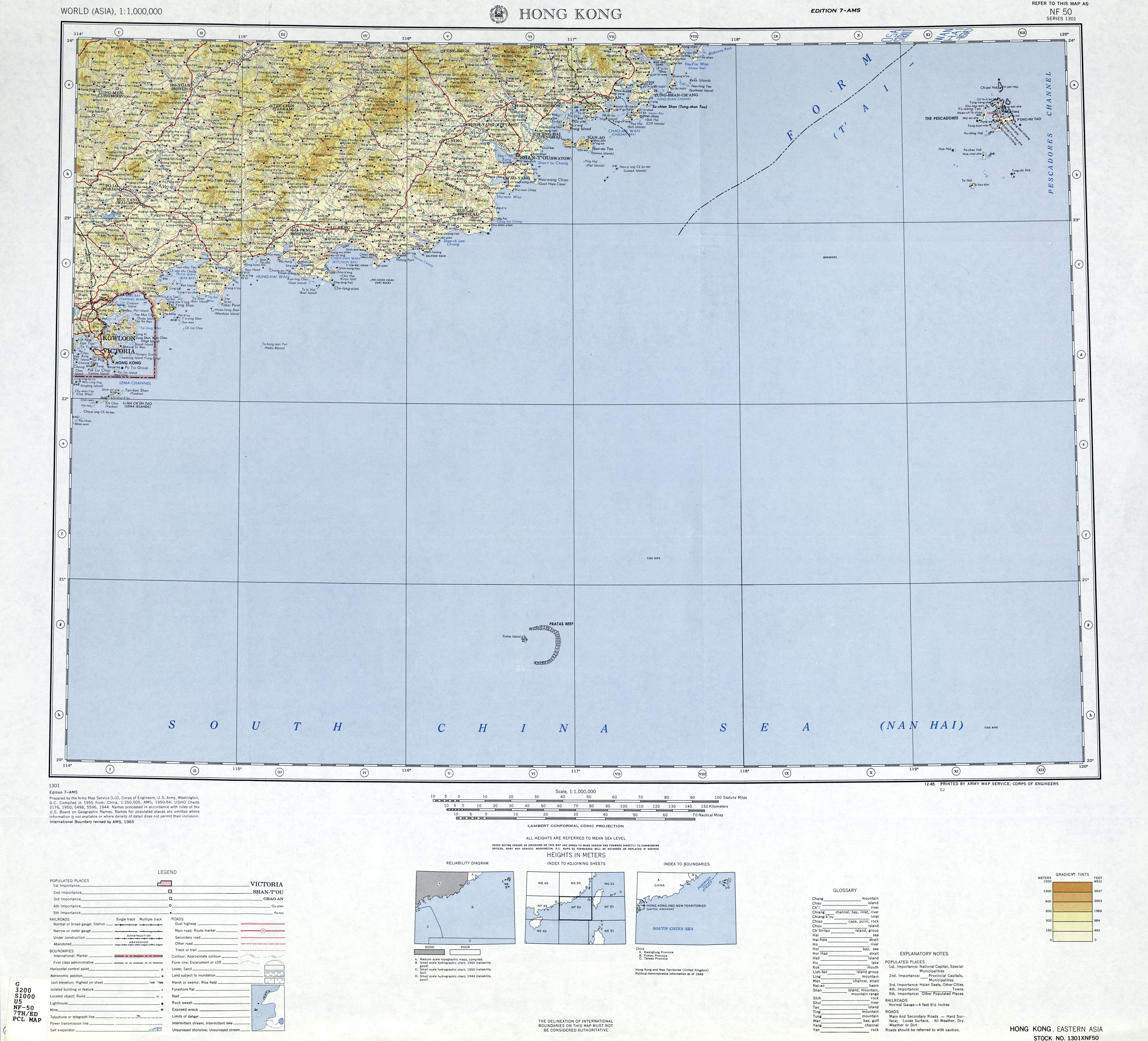
Map including Hong Kong and surrounding region from the International Map of the World (1955)

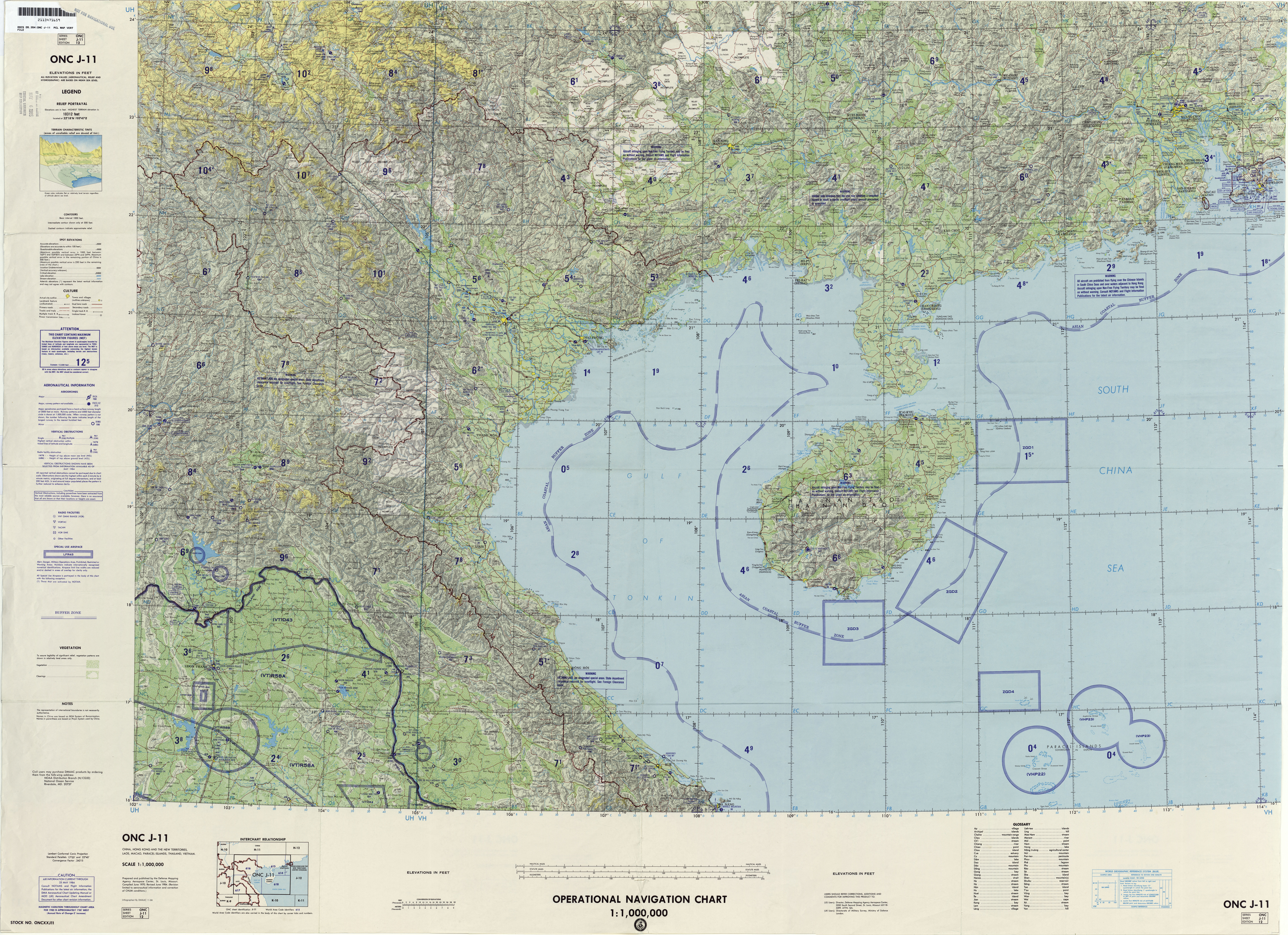
Map including Hong Kong and surrounding region (DMA, 1984)

Hong Kong is on China's southern coast, 60 km (37 mi) east of Macau, on the east side of the mouth of the Pearl River estuary. It is surrounded by the South China Sea on all sides except the north, which neighbours the Guangdong city of Shenzhen along the Sham Chun River. The territory's 2,755 km^{2} (1,064 sq mi) area consists of Hong Kong Island, the Kowloon Peninsula, the New Territories, Lantau Island, and over 200 other islands. Of the total area, 1,073 km^{2} (414 sq mi) is land and 35 km^{2} (14 sq mi) is water. The territory's highest point is Tai Mo Shan, 957 metres (3,140 feet) above sea level. Urban development is concentrated on the Kowloon Peninsula, Hong Kong Island, and in new towns throughout the New Territories. Much of this is built on reclaimed land, due to the lack of developable flat land; 70 km^{2} (27 sq mi) (six per cent of the total land or about 25 per cent of developed space in the territory) is reclaimed from the sea.

Undeveloped terrain is hilly to mountainous, with very little flat land, and consists mostly of grassland, woodland, shrubland, or farmland. About 40 per cent of the remaining land area is country parks and nature reserves. The territory has a diverse ecosystem; over 3,000 species of vascular plants occur in the region (300 of which are native to Hong Kong), and thousands of insect, avian, and marine species.

=== Land boundaries ===
Total: 30 km (19 mi)
Border city: Shenzhen Special Economic Zone, Guangdong Province
Figures published by the United States Central Intelligence Agency

=== Coastline ===
Total: 733 km (455 mi)
Maritime claims:
Territorial sea: 3 nautical miles (5.6 km; 3.5 mi)
Figures published by the United States Central Intelligence Agency

=== Islands ===
Hong Kong has 263 islands over 500 m^{2} (5,400 sq ft), including Hong Kong Island, Lantau Island, Cheung Chau, Lamma Island, Peng Chau and Tsing Yi Island.

=== Terrain ===
Hong Kong's terrain is hilly and mountainous with steep slopes. There are lowlands in the northern part of Hong Kong. A significant amount of land in Hong Kong, especially on the Hong Kong Island and the Kowloon peninsula, is reclaimed.

=== Extreme points ===
The lowest elevation in Hong Kong is in the South China Sea (0 m) while the highest elevation is at Tai Mo Shan (957 m (3,140 ft)) in Tsuen Wan, the New Territories.

==== Land ====
- Northernmost: Sham Chun River 22°33′44″N 114°9′41″E
- Easternmost: Ping Chau (aka. Tung Ping Chau) 22°32′26″N 114°26′30″E
- Southernmost: Tau Lo Chau 22°9′14″N 113°55′21″E
- Westernmost: Peaked Hill 22°13′1″N 113°50′7″E

=== Principal peaks of Hong Kong ===
1. Tai Mo Shan – 957 m (3,140 ft), Tsuen Wan
2. Lantau Peak (Fung Wong Shan) – 934 m (3,064 ft) on Lantau Island
3. Sunset Peak (Tai Tung Shan) – 869 m (2,851 ft), on Lantau Island
4. Sze Fong Shan – 785 m (2,575 ft)
5. Lin Fa Shan – 766 m (2,513 ft), on Lantau Island
6. Nei Lak Shan – 751 m (2,464 ft), on Lantau Island
7. Yi Tung Shan – 747 m (2,451 ft), on Lantau Island
8. Ma On Shan – 702 m (2,303 ft)
9. The Hunch Backs (Ngau Ngak Shan) – 674 m (2,211 ft)
10. Grassy Hill – 647 m (2,123 ft)
11. Wong Leng – 639 m (2,096 ft)
12. Buffalo Hill – 606 m (1,988 ft)
13. West Buffalo Hill – 604 m (1,982 ft)
14. Kowloon Peak (Fei Ngo Shan) – 602 m (1,975 ft)
15. Shun Yeung Fung – 591 m (1,939 ft)
16. Tiu Shau Ngam – 588 m (1,929 ft)
17. Kai Kung Leng – 585 m (1,919 ft)
18. Castle Peak – 583 m (1,913 ft)
19. Lin Fa Shan, Tsuen Wan – 578 m (1,896 ft)
20. Tate's Cairn (Tai Lo Shan) – 577 m (1,893 ft)

Victoria Peak, the highest point on Hong Kong Island, at 552 m (1,811 ft) is the 24th highest peak in Hong Kong.

=== Natural resources ===
The natural resources of Hong Kong can be divided into three main categories:

- Metalliferous minerals and non-metalliferous industrial minerals in the onshore area;
- Quarried rock and building stone;
- Offshore sand deposits.

Despite its small size, Hong Kong has a relatively large number of mineral occurrences. Some mineral deposits have been exploited commercially. Metalliferous mineral occurrences are grouped into four broad categories: tin-tungsten-molybdenum mineralisation, copper-lead-zinc mineralisation, iron mineralisation and placer deposits of tin and gold. Mesozoic igneous activity is largely responsible for this diversity of mineral deposits and the mineral concentrations have been variably enhanced by hydrothermal activity associated with faulting. Concentrations of non-metalliferous minerals that have been commercially exploited include kaolin clay, feldspar, quartz, beryl and graphite.

For many years, granite and volcanic rocks have been quarried locally for road base metal, riprap, armour stone and asphalt, although the main purpose now is for concrete aggregates. At present, there are three quarries operating in Hong Kong. These are principally in granite and are located at Lam Tei, Shek O and Anderson Road. All the quarries are in the process of rehabilitation and have a life expectancy of between two and eight years.

Offshore sand bodies have been dredged for aggregate sand and reclamation fill in Hong Kong as the rate of urban development has increased.

Additional natural resources include forest and wildlife.

=== Land use ===
Arable land: 2.95%
Permanent crops: 0.95%
Other: 96.10% (2012 est.)
Figures published by the United States Central Intelligence Agency Big 22

=== Natural hazards ===
Tropical cyclones are frequent in Hong Kong during the summer months between July and September. Landslides are common after rainstorms.

== Environmental issues ==
- Air and water pollution from rapid urbanisation
- Extinction of natural species
- Introduction of exotic species

== See also ==
- Conservation in Hong Kong
- Beaches of Hong Kong
- List of rivers and nullahs in Hong Kong
- List of bays in Hong Kong
- List of places in Hong Kong
- Sandbars in Hong Kong
- Geology of Hong Kong
- Origins of names of cities and towns in Hong Kong
- Geography of China
- Geography of Macau
- Pratas Island, Taiwan (ROC), located in the Hong Kong FIR
