= Lo Yan Shan =

Mountain in Hong Kong

- 老人山
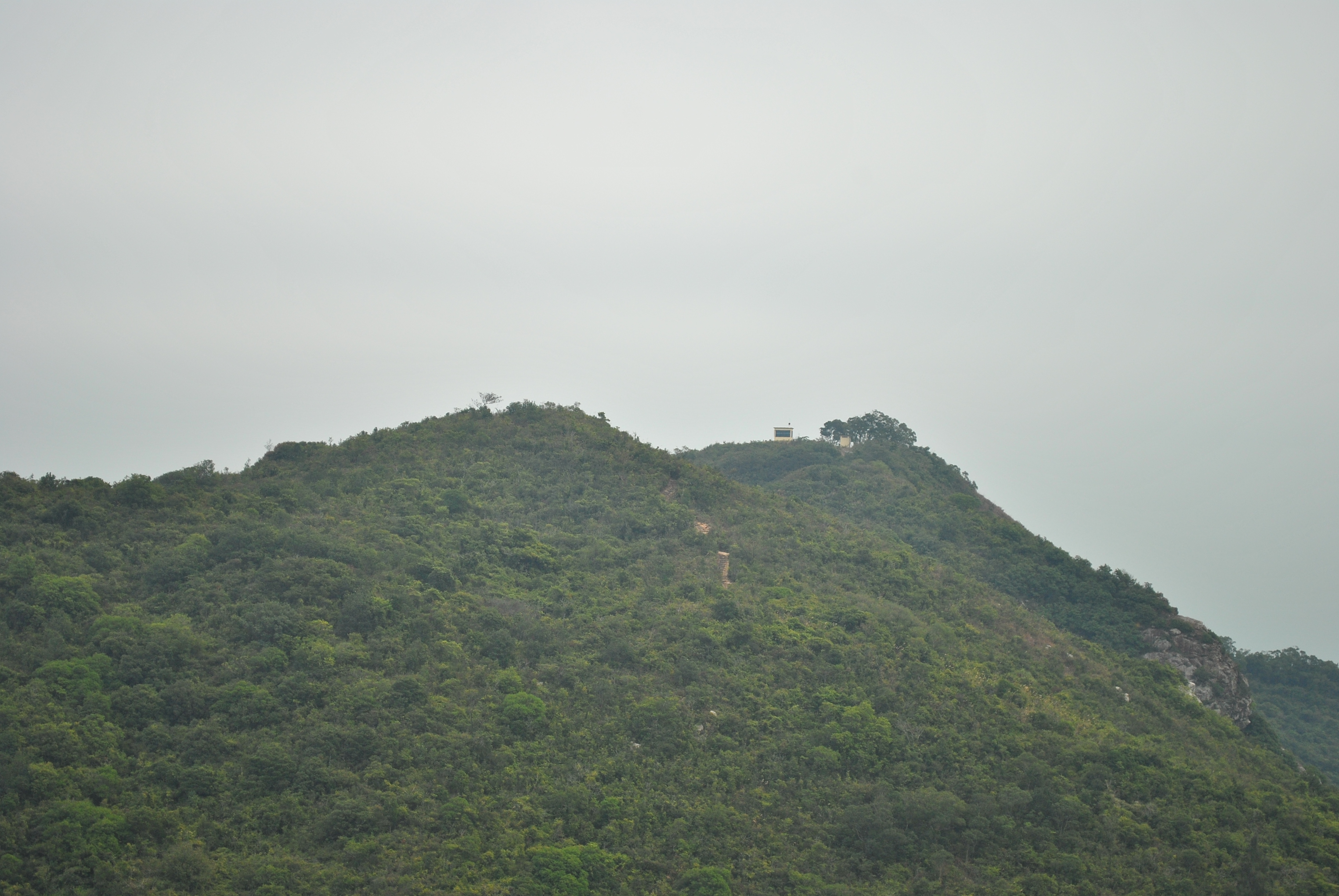
- Summit of Lo Yan Shan

Highest point
- Elevation: 303 m (994 ft)
- Coordinates: 22°13′39″N 113°59′24″E

Geography
- Location within Hong Kong
- Location: Lantau Island, Hong Kong

Lo Yan Shan (Chinese: 老人山; lit. 'Elderly Mountain') is a mountain on Lantau Island, Hong Kong, with a height of 303 metres (994 ft) above sea level.

== Geology ==
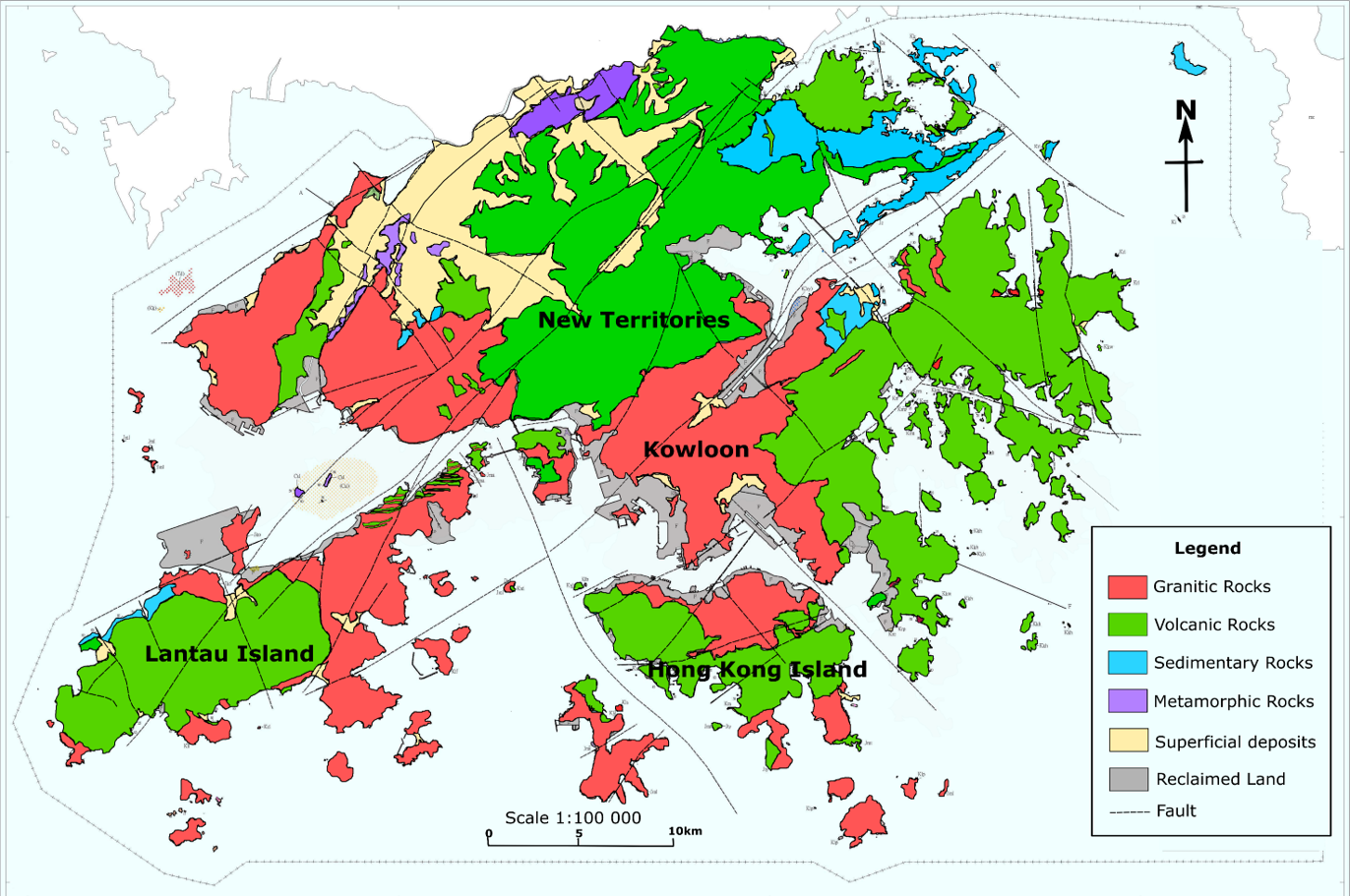
Lo Yan Shan is in the Red area on Lantau Island

Lo Yan Shan is formed by Granitic rocks, unlike many of the tallest mountains on Lantau Island, such as Lantau Peak, which are formed by Volcanic rocks.

== Geography ==
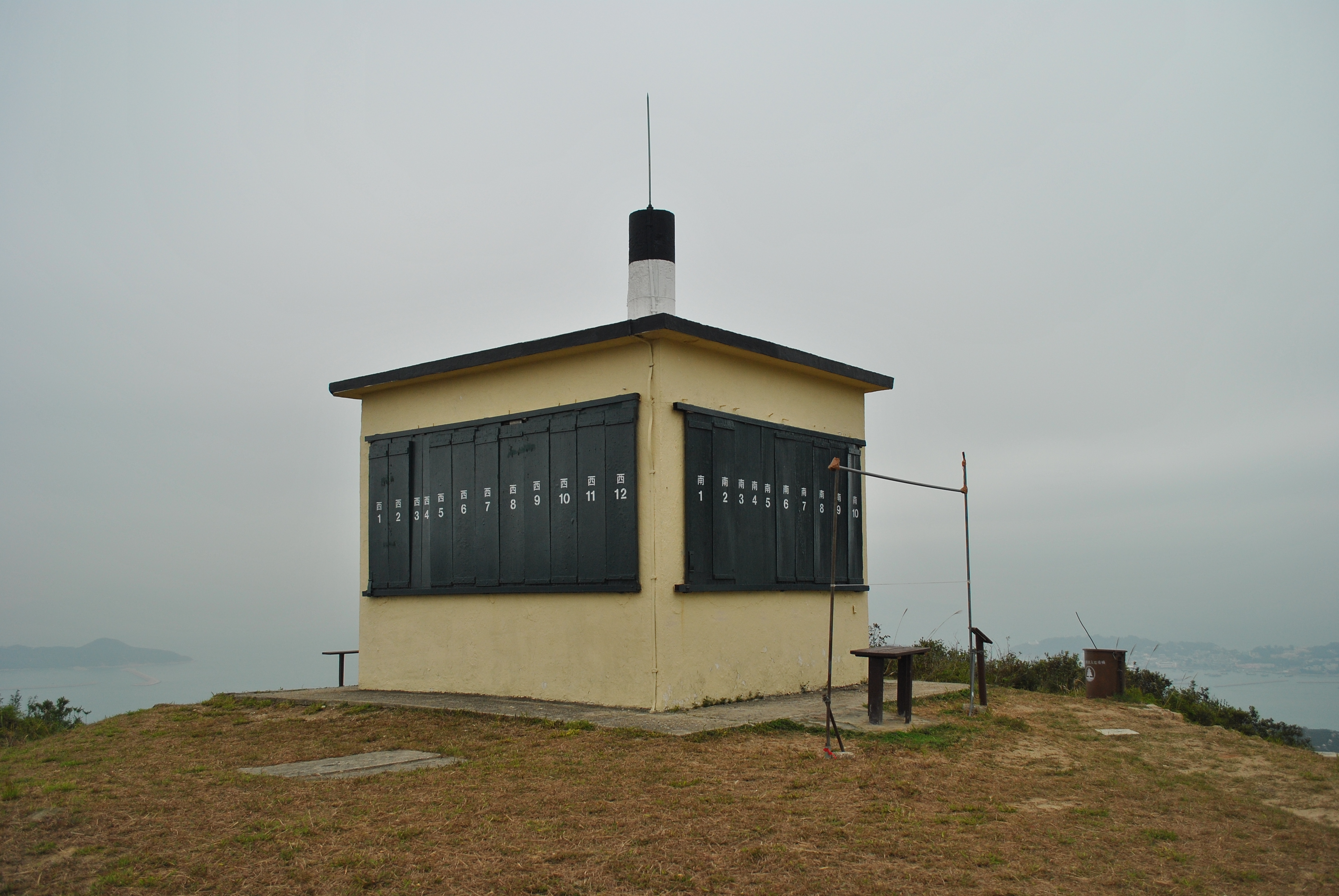
Hill fire lookout building on the summit of Lo Yan Shan

Lo Yan Shan is the tallest mountain on Chi Ma Wan peninsula. The Lantau Trail passes through the summit.

== See also ==
- List of mountains, peaks and hills in Hong Kong
- Mui Wo
