= Kau Nga Ling =

Mountain range in Hong Kong

- 狗牙嶺
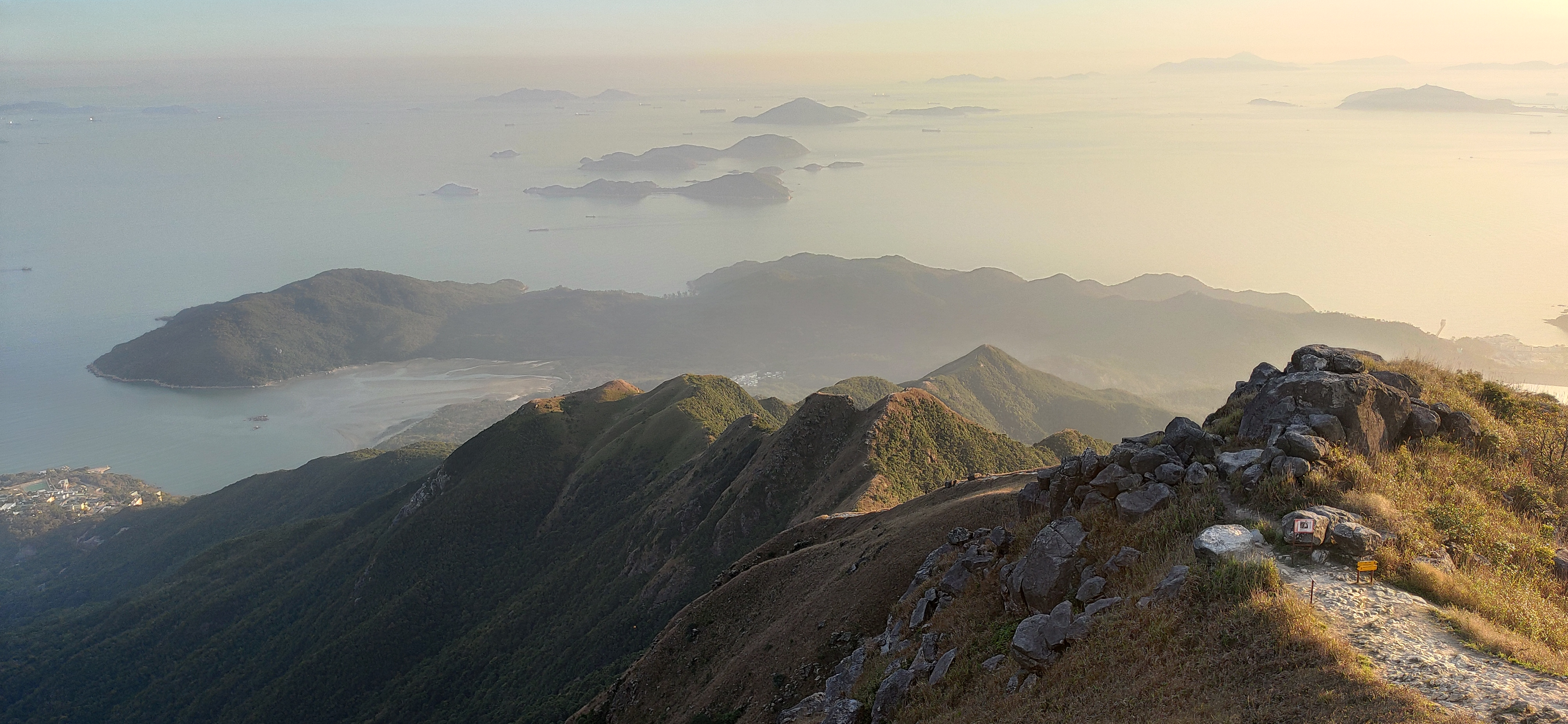
- Kau Nga Ling Ridge

Highest point
- Elevation: 539 m (1,768 ft)
- Prominence: 539 m (1,768 ft)
- Coordinates: 22°14′17″N 113°55′05″E

Geography
- Location within Hong Kong
- Location: Lantau Island, Hong Kong

Kau Nga Ling (Chinese: 狗牙嶺; lit. 'Dog Teeth Range'), is a series of precipitous mountains on Lantau Island, Hong Kong, with a height of 539 metres (1,768 ft) above sea level. It is one of 16 "high-risk" hiking locations identified by the local government. Kau Nga Ling is inside Lantau South Country Park, which was created in 1978.

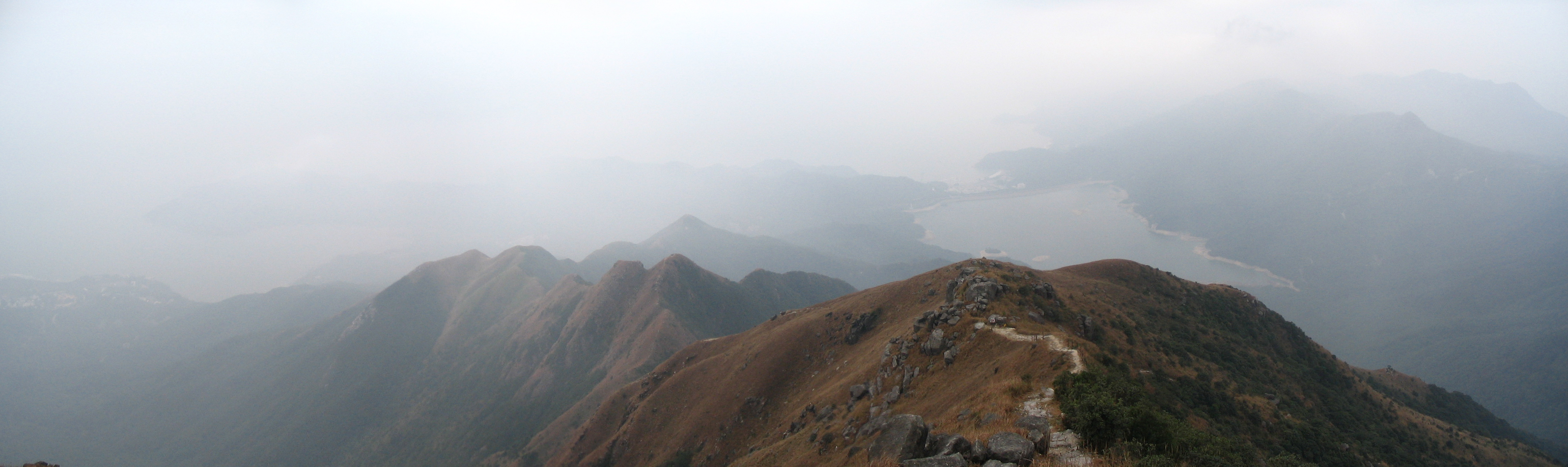
Kau Nga Ling Panorama on a foggy day

== Name ==
The mountains resemble the teeth of dogs, when viewed from above.

== Geology ==
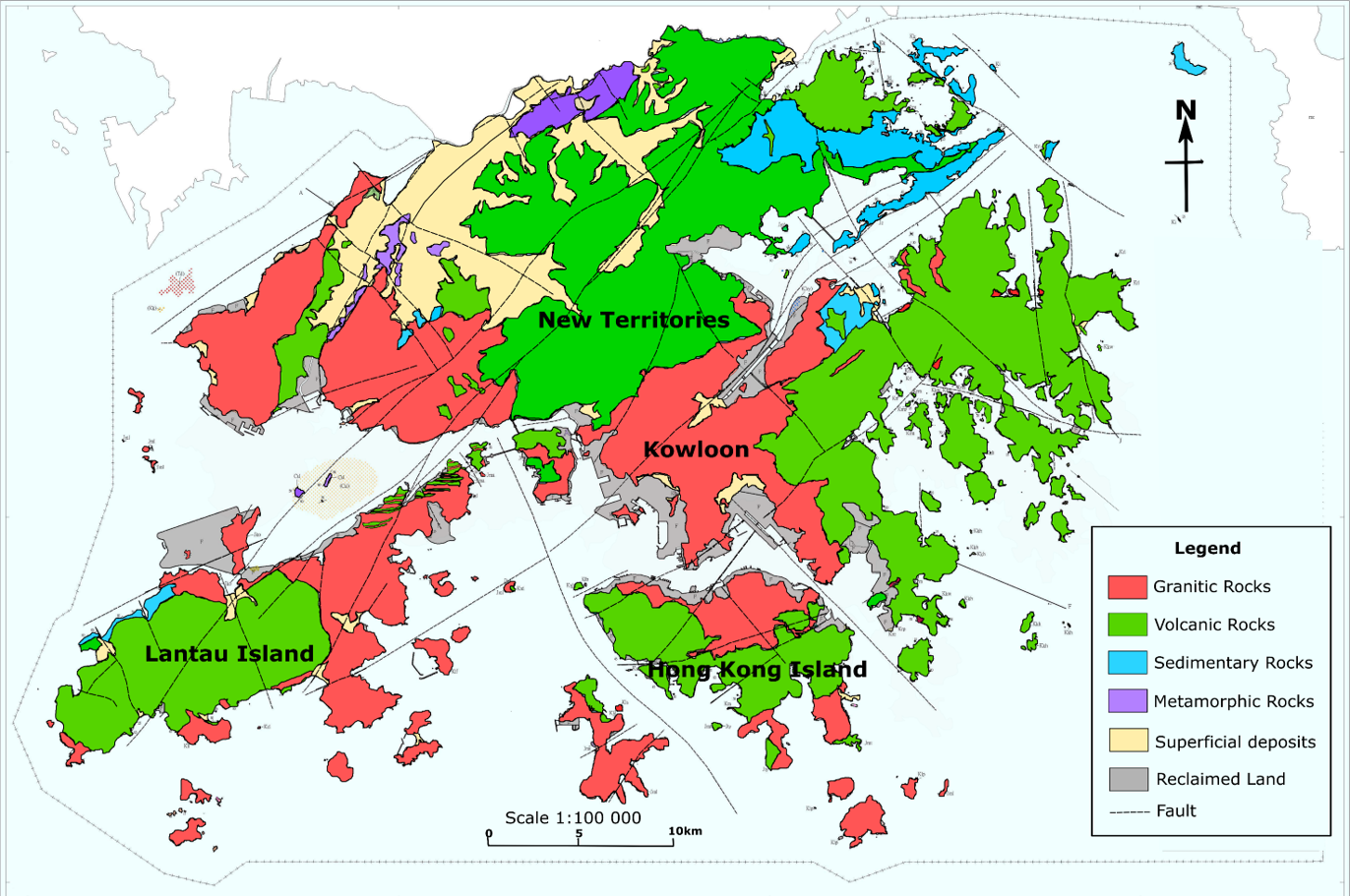
Kau Nga Ling is in the Green area on Lantau Island

Volcanic rocks are widely distributed in Hong Kong and formed most of the highest mountains in Hong Kong, such as Tai Mo Shan (957 m, the highest mountain), Lantau Peak (934 m, the second highest mountain) and surrounding mountains including Kau Nga Ling. This is in contrast to the many mountains in the Kowloon area that are formed by Granitic rocks, such as Lion Rock.

== Geography ==
To the north of Kau Nga Ling is Lantau Peak's summit (934 metres (3,064 ft)). To the west is Shek Pik Reservoir, which captures water from Kau Nga Ling and nearby ridges. To the south is the Tong Fuk village area, while to the east is Cheung Yan Shan (443 metres (1,453 ft)).

== Access ==
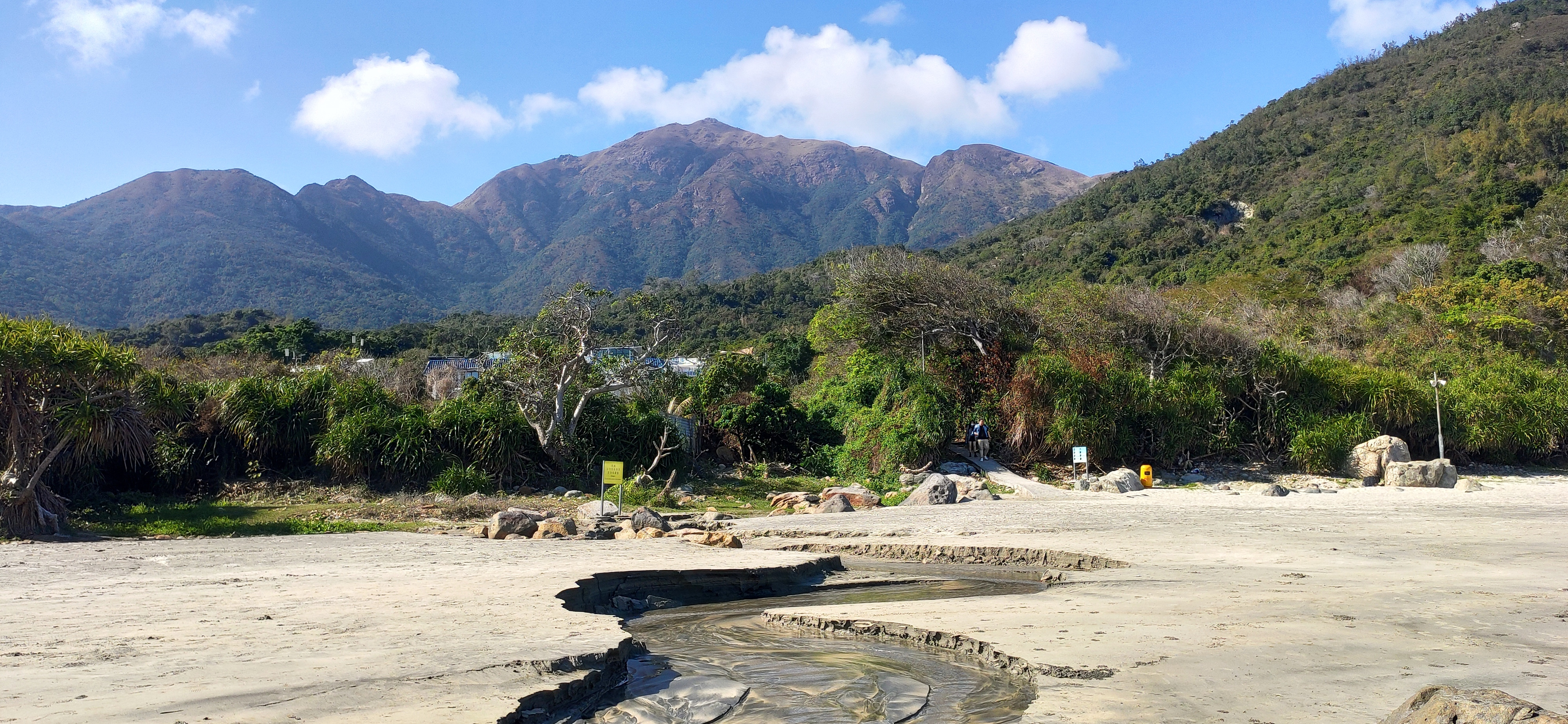
Lantau Peak and Kau Nga Ling (left)

There are three primary ridge hikes on Kau Nga Ling -- West Kau Nga, Middle Kau Nga and East Kau Nga. All three routes are technically and physically demanding, as hikers need to deal with jagged clusters of rocks under exposed conditions.

Among the three routes going up, West Kau Nga is considered the most difficult to climb, and it meets Middle Kau Nga at a precarious location called Lifeline (一線生機), where only one person could go through at any given time.

== Hiking safety ==
Kau Nga Ling is one of the most demanding and dangerous hiking spots for experienced hikers in Hong Kong.

Many hikers have perished or suffered serious injuries on Kau Nga Ling, so precautions are necessary.

== See also ==
- List of mountains, peaks and hills in Hong Kong
