= Shum Wan Shan =

Peak in Hong Kong

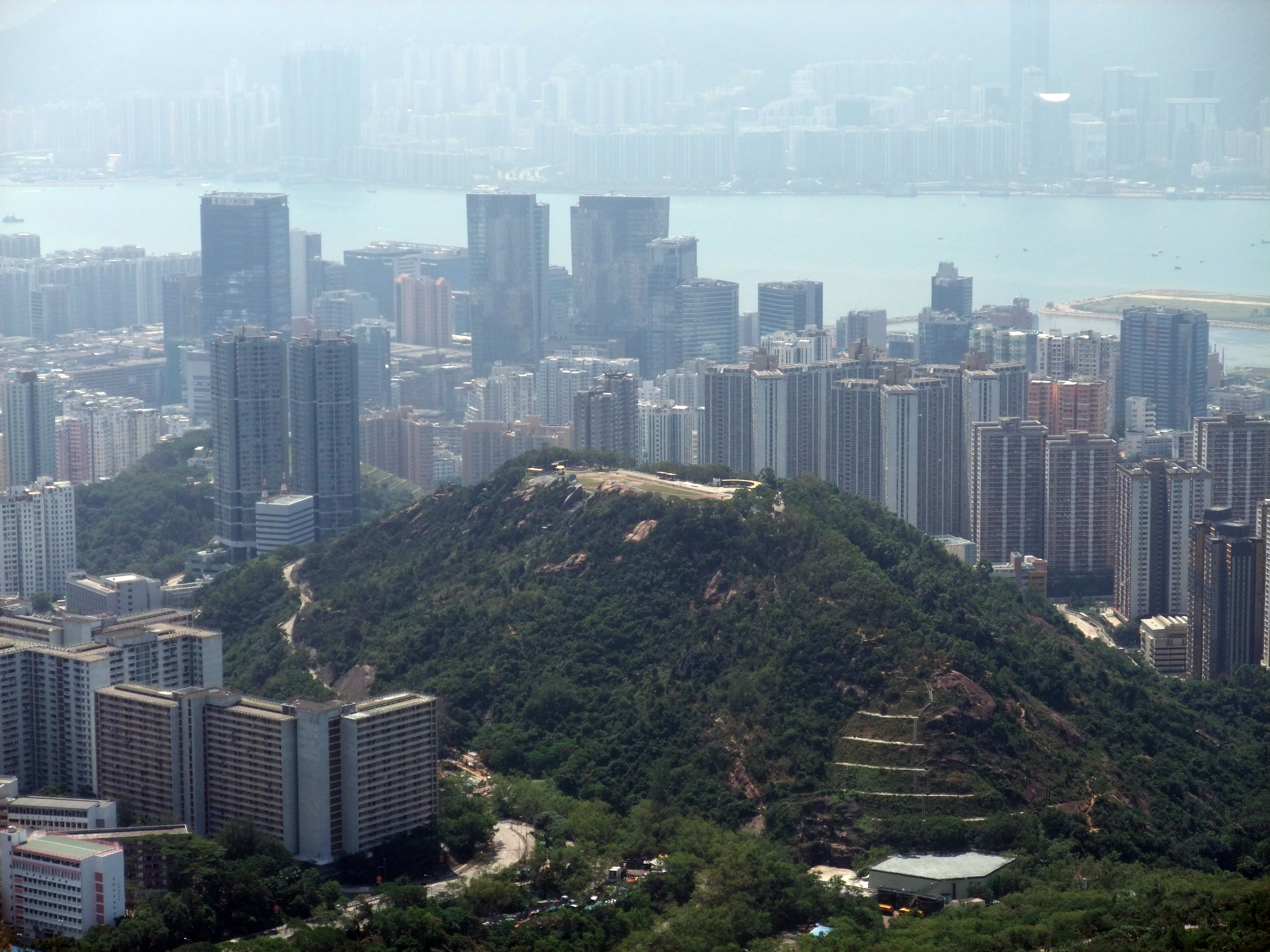
- Shum Wan Shan

Highest point
- Elevation: 177 m (581 ft)
- Coordinates: 22.3245°N 114.2235°E

Naming
- Native name: 沈雲山 (Chinese)

Geography
- Location within Hong Kong
- Location: Hong Kong

Shum Wan Shan (Chinese: 沈雲山) is a peak in Kwun Tong, Hong Kong. There is a water pumping station on Shum Wan Shan.

== Name ==
Some older maps do not show the name of this hill. The name of this mountain is sometimes misspelled as "Shun Wan Shan" instead of "Shum Wan Shan".

== See also ==
- List of mountains, peaks and hills in Hong Kong
