= Cheung Shan =

Cheung Shan (Chinese: 象山) may refer to the following hills in Hong Kong:

- Cheung Shan (Kowloon), a hill within Ma On Shan Country Park
- Cheung Shan (Lantau Island), a hill on Lantau Island

== See also ==
- Cheung Shan Estate, a public housing estate in Tsuen Wan
