= Fu Yung Pit =

Mountain in Hong Kong

- 芙蓉別
- Location within Hong Kong

Highest point
- Elevation: 515 m (1,690 ft)
- Prominence: 48 m (157 ft)
- Coordinates: 22°22′00″N 114°14′00″E

Geography
- Location: Hong Kong

Fu Yung Pit (Chinese: 芙蓉別) is a mountain located in northeastern Kowloon, Hong Kong, with a height of 515 metres (1,690 ft) above sea level.

== See also ==
- List of mountains, peaks and hills in Hong Kong
