= Sharp Peak =

Mountain in Hong Kong

- 蚺蛇尖
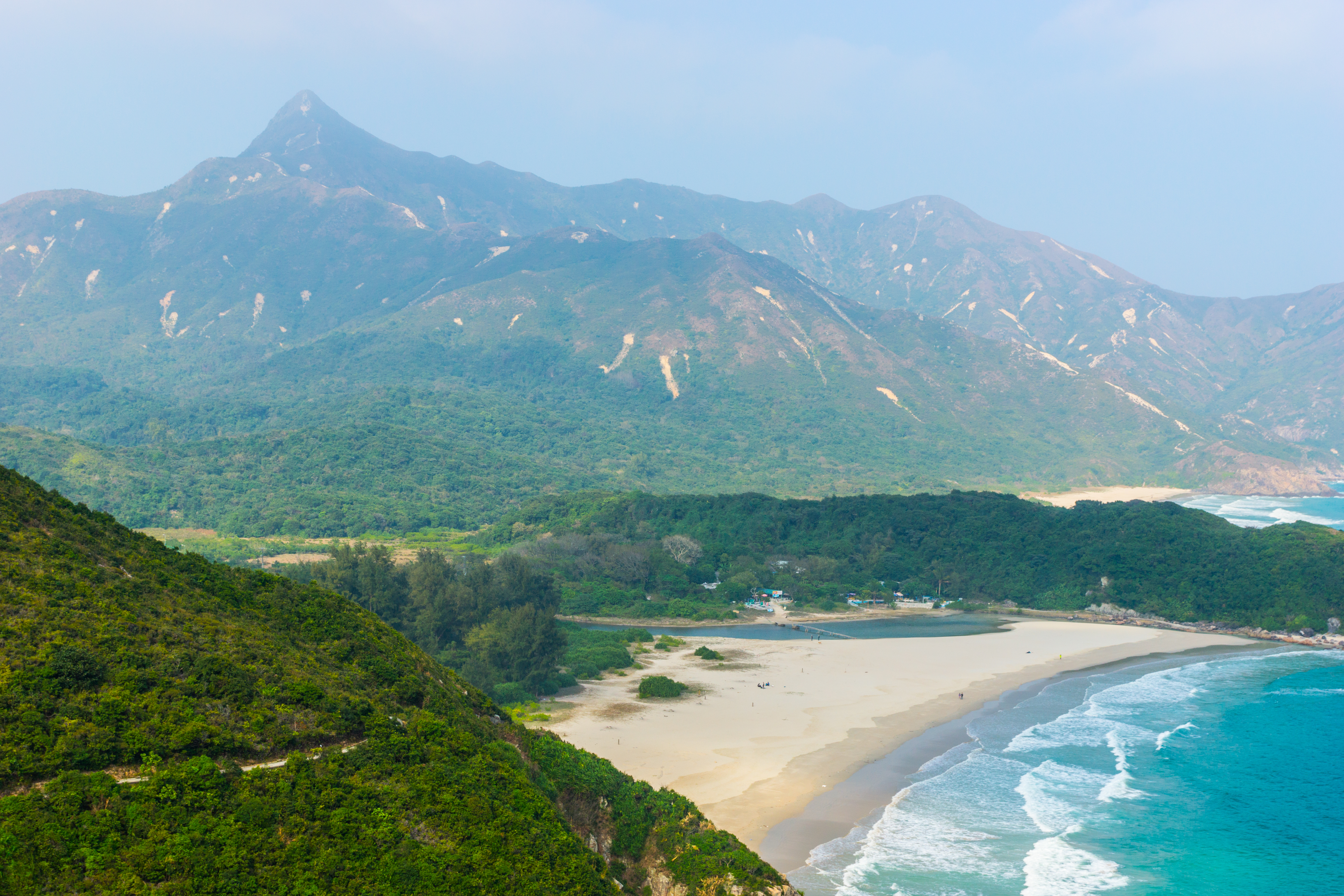
- Sharp Peak, rising in the background above the Ham Tin Wan beach.

Highest point
- Elevation: 468 m (1,535 ft); HKPD
- Coordinates: 22°25′51″N 114°22′33″E

Geography
- Location within Hong Kong
- Location: Eastern New Territories, Hong Kong

Sharp Peak (Chinese: 蚺蛇尖), or Nam She Tsim, is a hill inside Sai Kung East Country Park, north of Tai Long Wan, in the Sai Kung Peninsula in Hong Kong. It is particularly well known for its well-defined sharp peak, which rises to a height of 468 metres (1,535 ft) above sea level. The hill is reasonably hard for hikers because of its steep rocky terrain and should only be attempted in good weather with correct equipment.

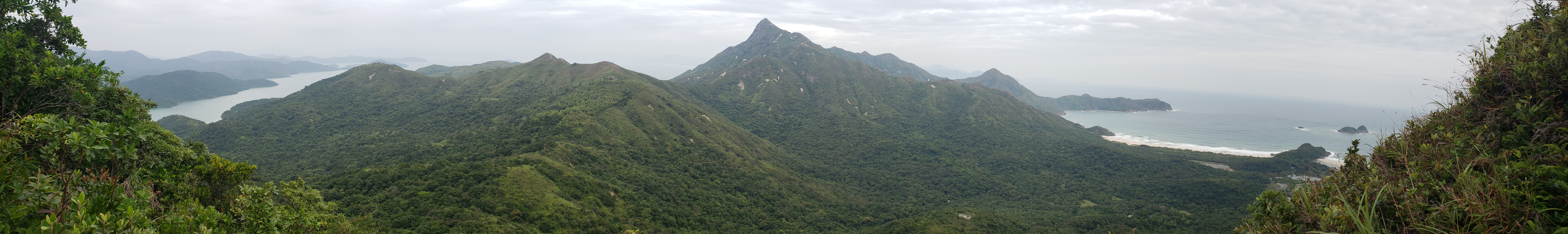
Panorama of Sharp Peak as seen from Tai Mun Shan.

== See also ==
- List of mountains, peaks and hills in Hong Kong
- Three Sharp Peaks of Hong Kong
- High Junk Peak
- Castle Peak
