= Shek Pik Reservoir =

Reservoir in New Territories, Hong Kong

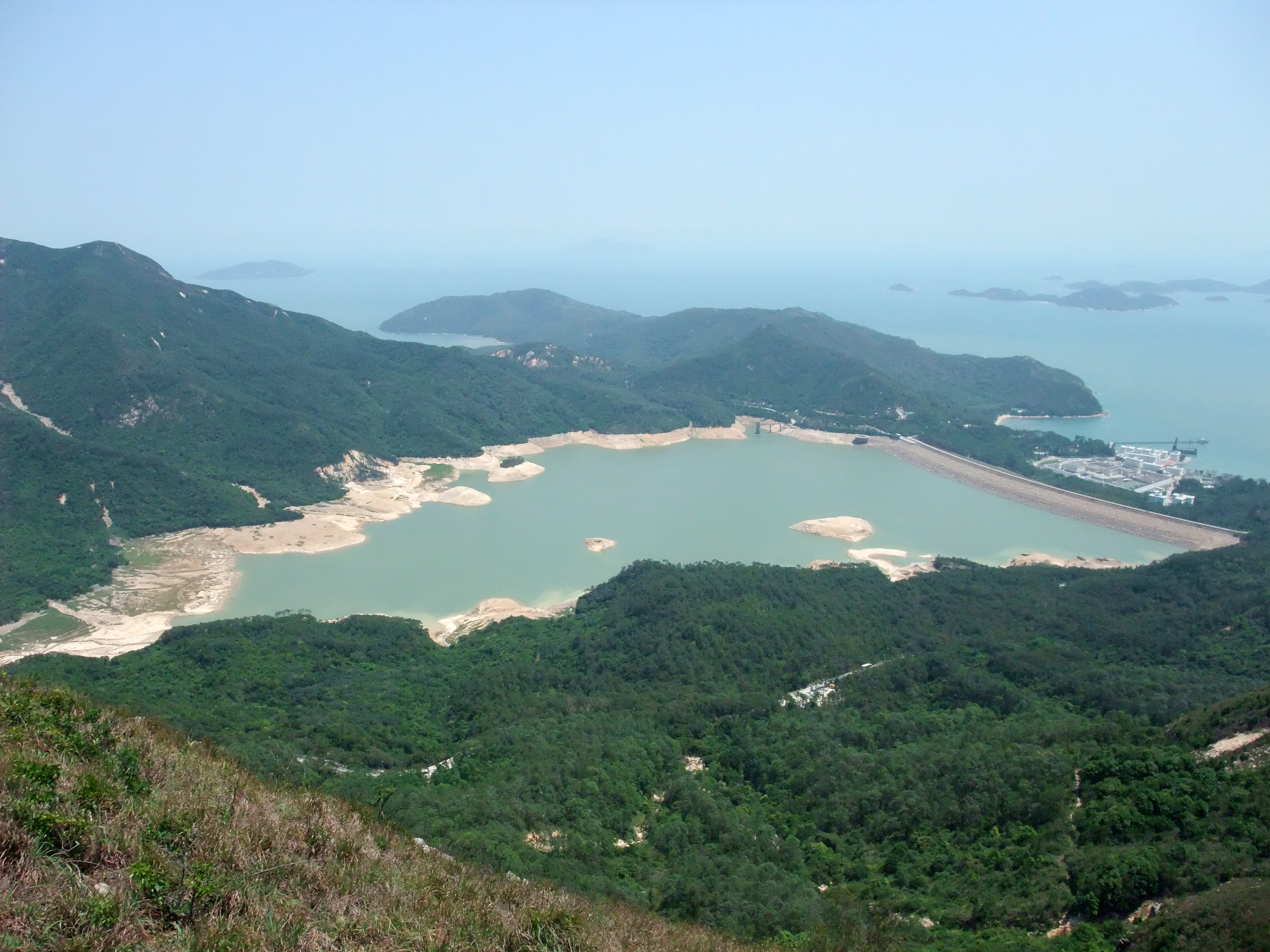
- Shek Pik Reservoir

- Location within Hong Kong
- Location: Lantau Island, Hong Kong
- Coordinates: 22°13′39″N 113°53′42″E
- Type: reservoir

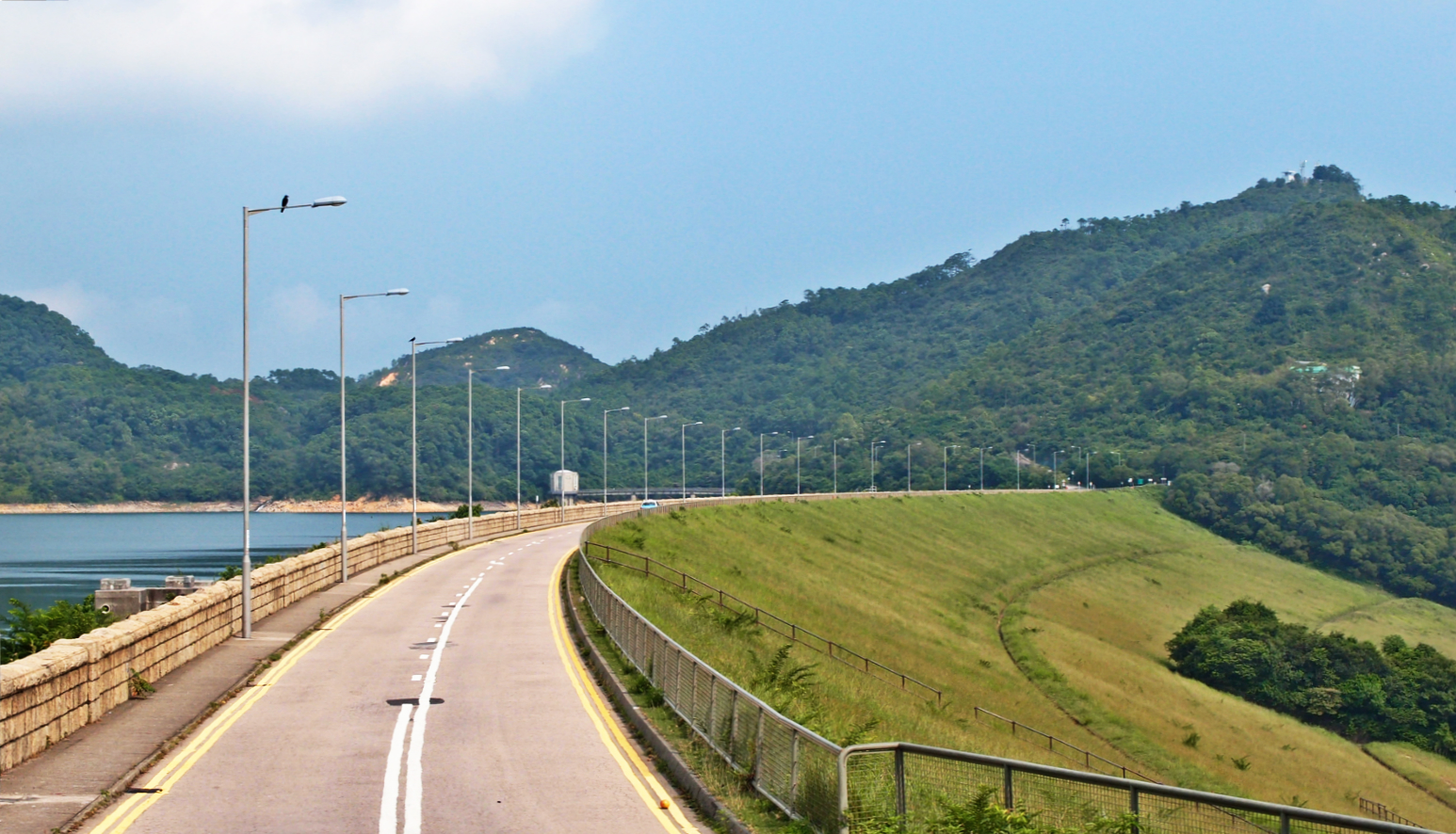
South Lantau Road at Shek Pik Reservoir.

Shek Pik Reservoir (Chinese: 石壁水塘) is a reservoir in Shek Pik on Lantau Island in Hong Kong. Built between 1957 and 1963, it has a storage capacity of 24 million cubic metres and is the third largest reservoir in Hong Kong after High Island Reservoir and Plover Cove Reservoir.

== Location ==
Shek Pik Reservoir is located within Lantau South Country Park. It is surrounded by the following areas: Kau Nga Ling (east), Keung Shan (west), Muk Yue Shan and Sz Tsz Tau Shan (north). The top of the main dam is part of Keung Shan Road which connects Tai O with Cheung Sha, Mui Wo and Tung Chung. Below the dam is Shek Pik Prison managed by the Hong Kong Correctional Services.

A major water source for Shek Pik Reservoir is Tung Chung River. The water, collected by tunnels, is transferred to the reservoir via an underground pipe running between Ngong Ping and Lantau Peak.

== History ==
In the 1950s, water shortages affected Hong Kong. To relieve the problem the Hong Kong Government decided to build a reservoir in Shek Pik Heung valley (石壁鄉) and to further develop Lantau Island. The main contractor for the reservoir scheme was Soletanche, a French company.

Prior to construction there were four villages, Shek Pik Tai Tsuen (石壁大村), Fan Pui Tsuen (墳背村), Kong Pui Tsuen (崗貝村) and Hang Tsai Tsuen (坑仔村), in the valley. They were all relocated as part of the reservoir construction.

A Hau Wong Temple was located there and was inundated by the Shek Pik Reservoir in 1960.

In 1961, an 8-mile submarine pipeline was built to move water from the reservoir to Hong Kong Island, submerged from Silvermine Bay to Sandy Bay. Water supply started in November 1963, however there was an internal lining failure.

== See also ==
- Water supply and sanitation in Hong Kong
