= Cheung Shan (Lantau Island) =

Hill on Lantau, Hong Kong

- 象山
- Location within Hong Kong

Highest point
- Elevation: 449 m (1,473 ft)
- Coordinates: 22°15′36″N 113°52′47″E

Geography
- Location: Hong Kong

Cheung Shan (Chinese: 象山; lit. 'Elephant Mountain') is a mountain on Lantau Island in Hong Kong at 449 metres (1,473 ft) in height. It is one of the Four Guardian Beasts (四靈獸) of Tai O Village.

== See also ==
- List of mountains, peaks and hills in Hong Kong
- Fu Shan (Tiger)
