= Lantau South Country Park =

Country park in New Territories, Hong Kong

Coordinates: 22.2423°N 113.9272°E

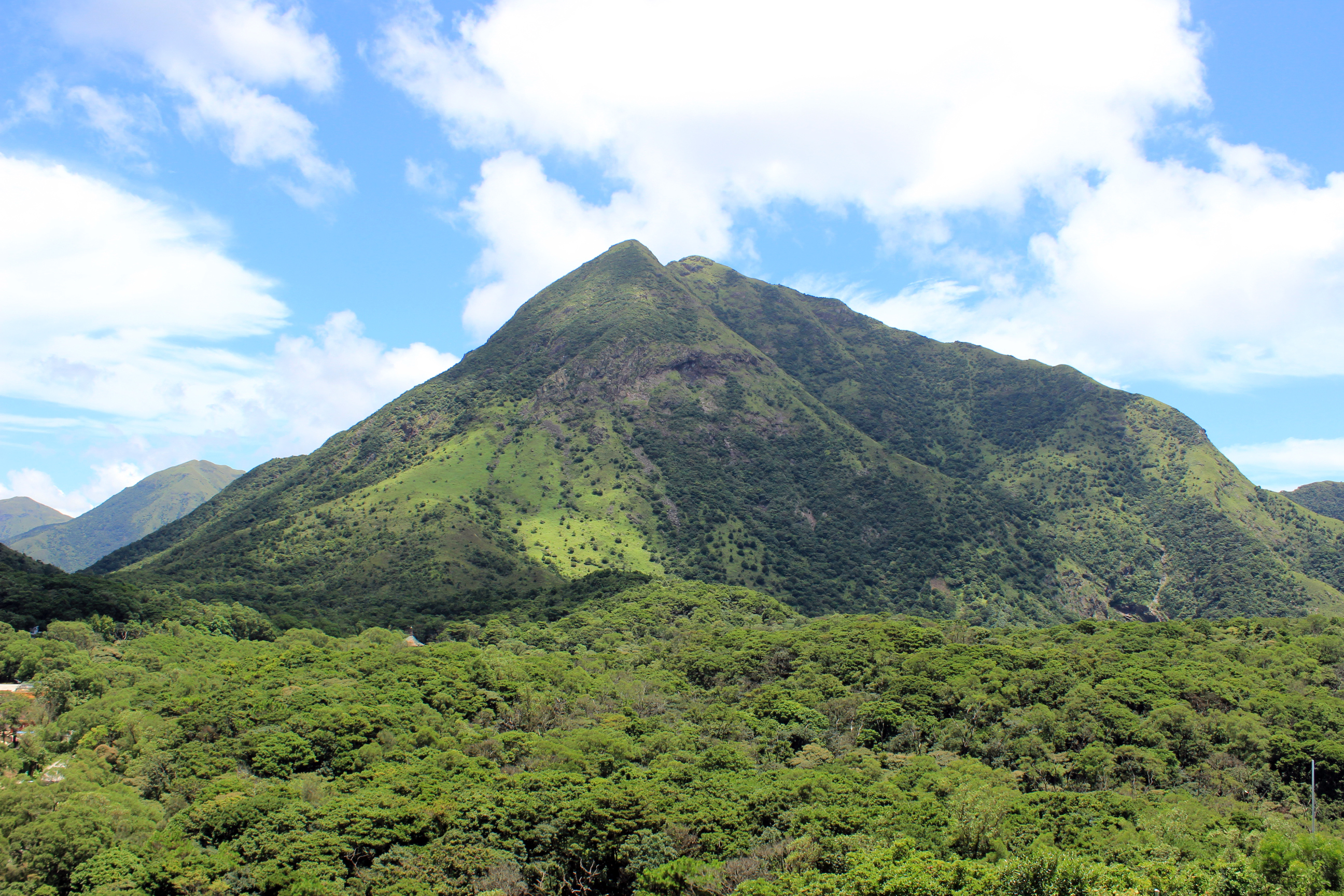
- Lantau Peak is located within Lantau South Country Park
- Type: Country park
- Location: Lantau Island, Hong Kong
- Area: 5,646 hectares (13,950 acres)
- Designated: 20 April 1978; 48 years ago
- Manager: Agriculture, Fisheries and Conservation Department

Lantau South Country Park (Chinese: 南大嶼郊野公園) is one of two rural country parks on Lantau Island, Hong Kong, the other one being Lantau North Country Park and its extension.

Lantau South Country Park is located on the south side of the island. It was designated on 20 April 1978. At 56.4 square kilometres (21.8 sq mi), it is the largest country park in Hong Kong.

== Sites ==
- Lantau Peak
- Sunset Peak
- Yi Tung Shan
- Fan Lau
- Shek Pik Reservoir
- Chi Ma Wan Peninsula
