= Lin Fa Shan =

Mountain in Hong Kong

- 蓮花山
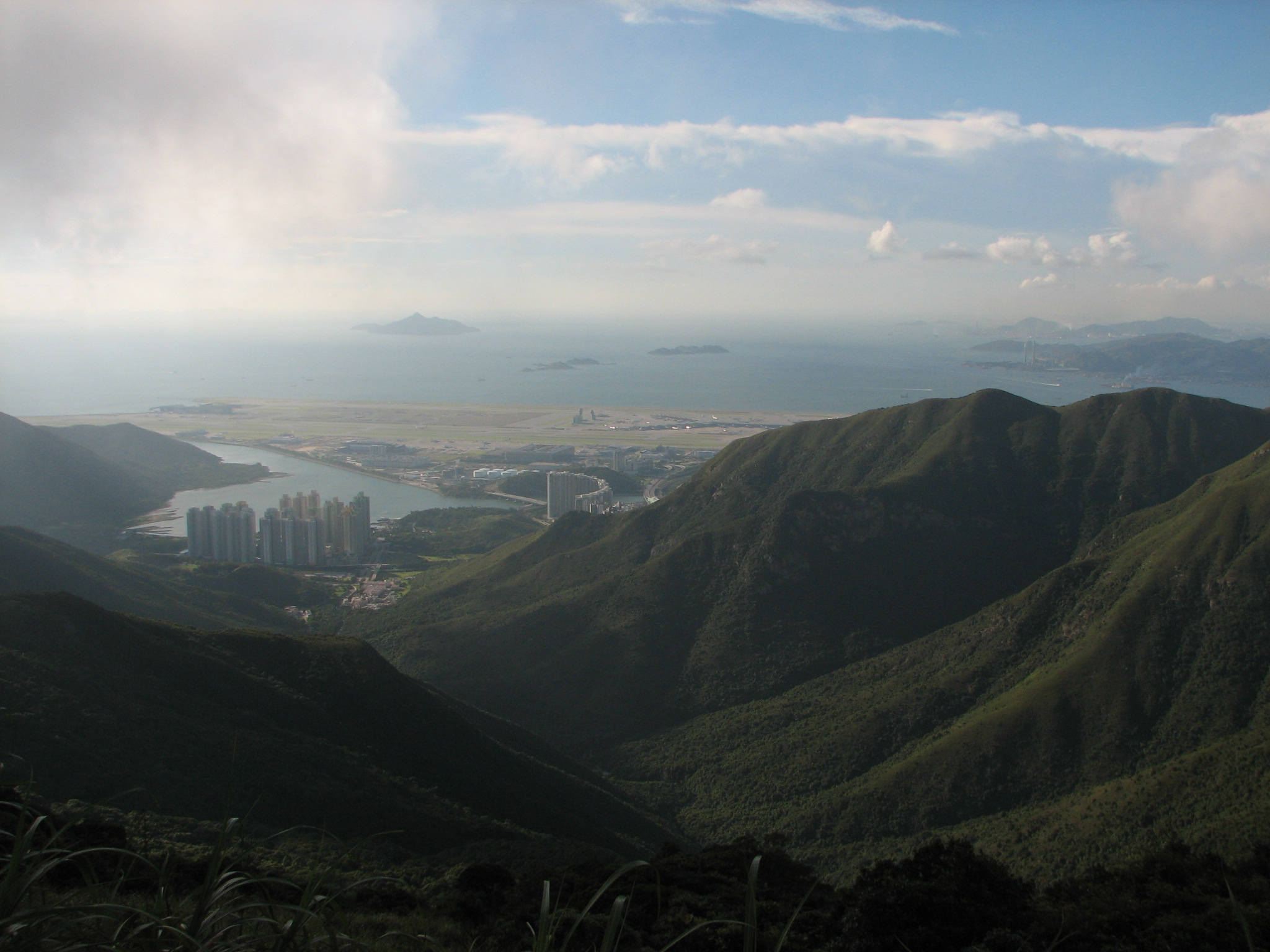
- View of Lin Fa Shan, Lantau, Hong Kong

Highest point
- Elevation: 766 m (2,513 ft)
- Coordinates: 22°16′25.31″N 113°58′17.99″E

Geography
- Location within Hong Kong
- Location: Lantau Island, Hong Kong

Lin Fa Shan (Chinese: 蓮花山) is the seventh highest mountain in Hong Kong. With a height of 766 m on Lantau Island, it is situated between Mui Wo and Sunset Peak.

== Name ==
The Cantonese name Lin Fa Shan (Chinese: 蓮花山; Jyutping: Lin^{4} Faa^{1} Saan^{1}) literally means "Lotus Flower Mountain".

== Subpeaks ==
There are a few subpeaks that are given names in the Lin Fa Shan area, including:

- Sam Shan Toi (721 metres (2,365 ft))
- Ap Kuk Lek (721 metres (2,365 ft))

== See also ==
- List of mountains, peaks and hills in Hong Kong
