= Lantau North Country Park =

Rural park in New Territories, Hong Kong

Coordinates: 22.2555°N 113.8850°E

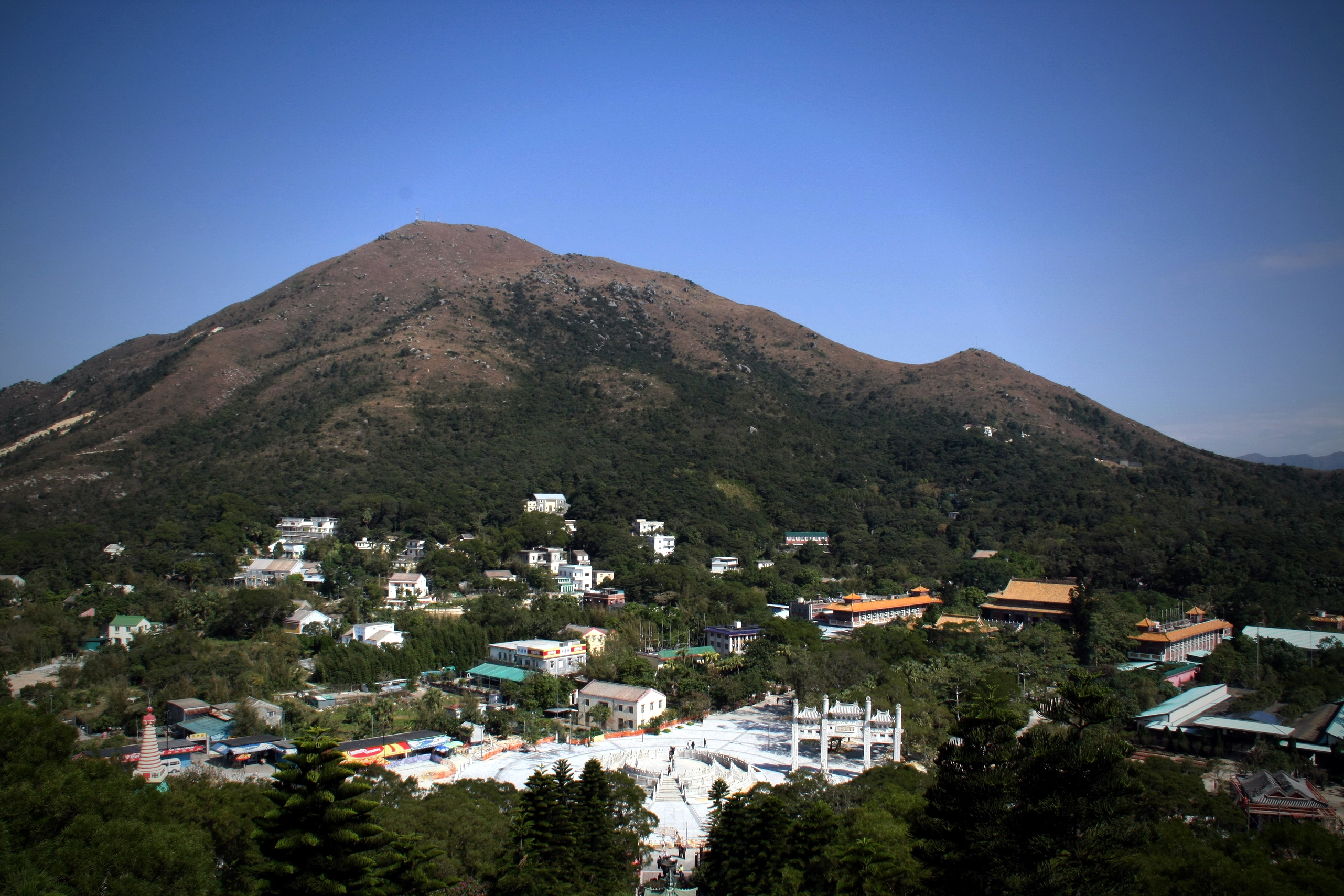
- Nei Lak Shan, a 751-metre-tall mountain located in Lantau North Country Park
- Type: Country park
- Location: Lantau Island, Hong Kong
- Area: 2,200 hectares (5,400 acres)
- Designated: 18 August 1978; 47 years ago
- Manager: Agriculture, Fisheries and Conservation Department

Lantau North Country Park (Chinese: 北大嶼郊野公園) is one of two rural parks on Lantau Island, Hong Kong and is located on the north side of the island. The 22-square-kilometre (8.5 sq mi) park was designated in 1978.

== History ==
Lantau North Country Park was designated on 18 August 1978.

An extension to the park, called Lantau North (Extension) Country Park, was conceived in 1993. In 1999, the government announced an expansion of the country park area on Lantau Island. The extension was officially designated on 7 November 2008.

== Features ==
Highlights of the park include:

- Wong Lung Hang Country Trail
- Tung Chung Fort
- Tai Tung Shan (Sunset Peak)
- Yi Tung Shan
- Lin Fa Shan 766m
- Lo Fu Tau 465m
- Three Towers
