= Tai Mun Shan =

Hill in Hong Kong

- 大蚊山
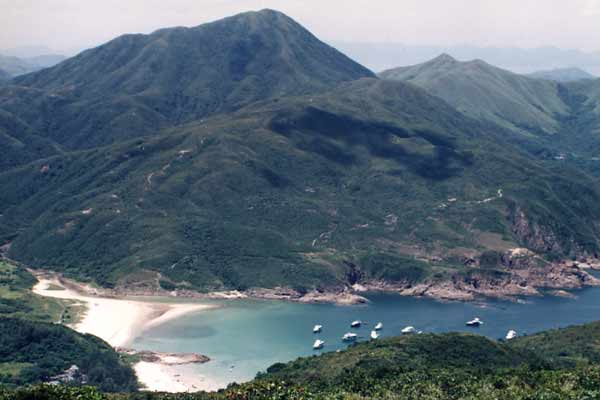
- Tai Mun Shan rising behind the bay of Sai Wan

Highest point
- Elevation: 370 m (1,210 ft)
- Coordinates: 22°24′56.21″N 114°21′53.12″E

Geography
- Location within Hong Kong
- Location: Eastern New Territories, Hong Kong

Tai Mun Shan (Chinese: 大蚊山; Cantonese Yale: daaih mān shāan) lies to the west of Tai Long Wan near Chek King on the Sai Kung Peninsula in Hong Kong. The hill comprises a rounded peak, which rises to a height 370 metres (1,210 feet).

The name translates as the Big Hill of the Mosquitoes.

== See also ==
- List of mountains, peaks and hills in Hong Kong
- Sai Wan
- Sai Kung Country Park
