= Sunset Peak (Hong Kong) =

Mountain on Lantau Island, Hong Kong

- 大東山
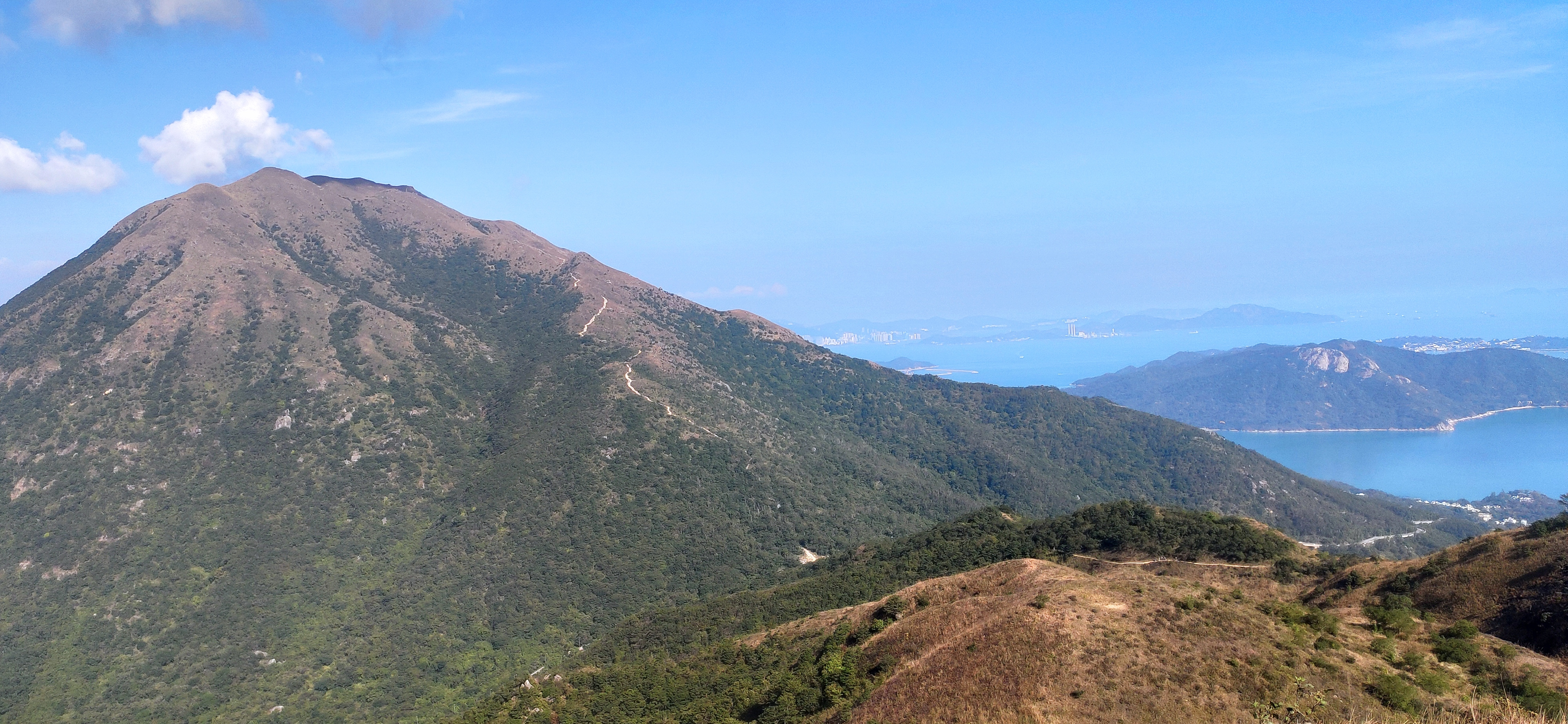
- View of Sunset Peak (2020)

Highest point
- Elevation: 869 m (2,851 ft)
- Coordinates: 22°15′26″N 113°57′10″E

Geography
- Location within Hong Kong
- Location: Southern Lantau Island, Hong Kong

Sunset Peak or Tai Tung Shan (Chinese: 大東山) is the third-highest peak in Hong Kong and the second-highest on the island of Lantau. It is situated within the Lantau South Country Park and the Lantau North Country Park and stands at a height of 869 metres (2,851 ft) above the Hong Kong Principal Datum, or 868 metres (2,848 ft) above mean sea level. The second-highest peak of the territory and the highest on the island, the Lantau Peak, is located to its west.

== Hiking ==
Sunset Peak is one of Hong Kong's most famous hikes, especially for views of sunrise and sunset. Visitors often flock to the mountain in the winter months to enjoy views of the seasonal silvergrass paired with dramatic views.

Hiking up Sunset Peak is not easy and requires a good level of fitness. The two most common routes to hike up to the summit of Sunset Peak include starting from Pak Kung Au and from Nam Shan Campsite. The Nam Shan Campsite route is usually less crowded and ends at the best viewpoint for sunset photos.

== Name ==
The Cantonese name Tai Tung Shan (Chinese: 大東山; Cantonese Yale: daaih dūng shāan, Jyutping: Daai^{6} Dung^{1} Saan^{1}) literally means "Big East Mountain".

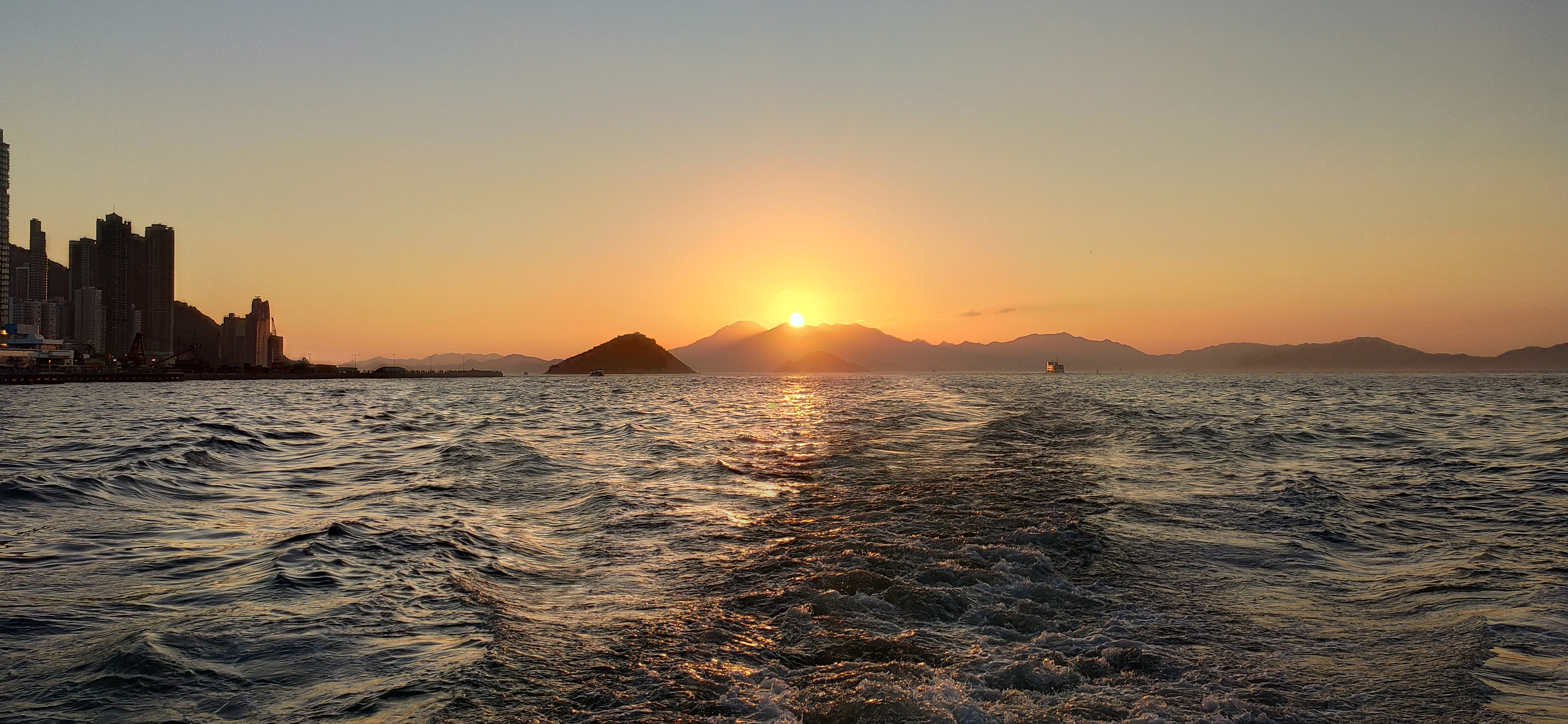
The sun sets on Sunset Peak. Viewed from Victoria Harbour.

== Access ==
Sunset Peak is only accessible by foot. It is located on section 2 of the 70 km (43 mi) long Lantau Trail. Section 2 is 6.5 km long and goes from Nam Shan Campsite west of Mui Wo on South Lantau Road (elevation about 120 m), to Pak Kung Au, another campsite on the Tung Chung Road (elevation about 340 m). Both campsites are served by a number of bus routes going to Mui Wo, Tung Chung, and other destinations on Lantau island.

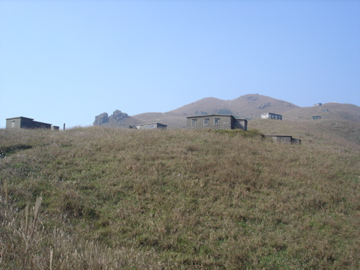
Sunset Peak Huts

== See also ==
- List of mountains, peaks and hills in Hong Kong
- Lantau Peak
