= Lantau Peak =

Mountain on Lantau Island, Hong Kong

- 鳳凰山
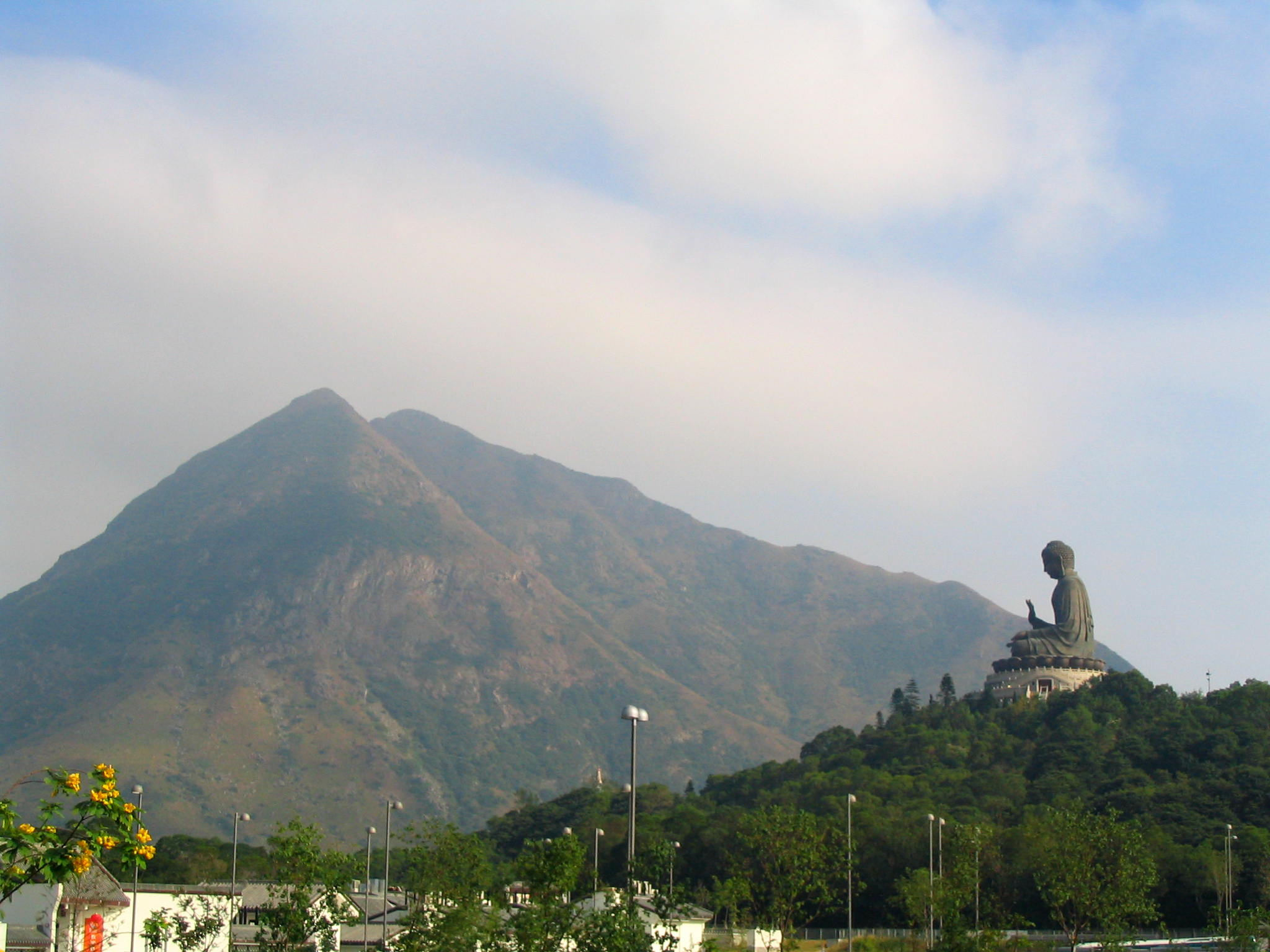
- Lantau Peak rises high above the Tian Tan Buddha.

Highest point
- Elevation: 934 m (3,064 ft)
- Prominence: 934 m (3,064 ft)
- Coordinates: 22°14′59.17″N 113°55′16.69″E

Geography
- Location within Hong Kong
- Location: Lantau Island, Hong Kong

Lantau Peak
- Traditional Chinese: 鳳凰山
- Simplified Chinese: 凤凰山
Transcriptions
Standard Mandarin
- Hanyu Pinyin: Fènghuáng Shān
Yue: Cantonese
- Yale Romanization: Fuhng wòhng sāan
- Jyutping: Fung6 wong4 saan1

Lantau Peak, or Fung Wong Shan (literally "Phoenix Mountain"), is a mountain in Lantau South Country Park, Lantau Island, Hong Kong. It is the second-highest peak in Hong Kong and the highest point on the island, with a height of 934 metres (3,064 ft) above the Hong Kong Principal Datum, or around 933 metres (3,061 ft) above mean sea level.

== Name origin ==
The mountain is made up of a pair of peaks. The taller peak is known as "Fung Fung" (Chinese: 鳳峰 lit: male phoenix summit), and the lower peak is known as "Wong Fung" (Chinese: 凰峰 lit: female phoenix summit). Together, they form "Fung Wong Shan".

== Location ==
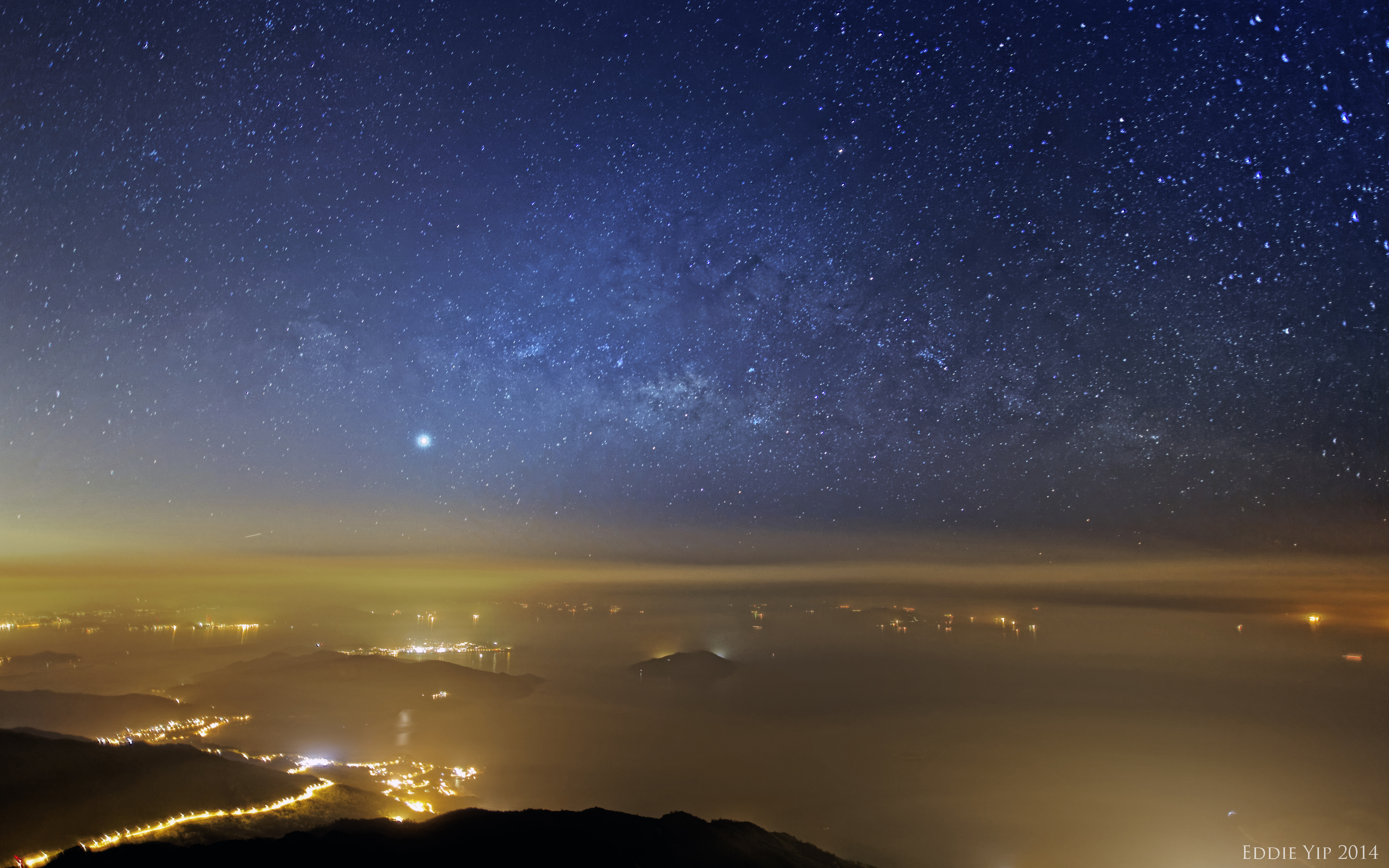
Starry light and galaxy seen from Lantau Peak

Lantau Peak is located within Lantau South Country Park, near the center of Lantau Island, and west of Sunset Peak, which is the second-highest peak on the island. Lantau Peak is reachable by the Lantau Trail. At the foot of Lantau Peak, a tourist spot called the Wisdom Path (心經簡林) can be found.

== Geology ==
Lantau Peak is formed by volcanic rocks, including porphyritic rhyolites, like many of the tallest mountains in Hong Kong, such as Tai Mo Shan. Some shorter mountains in Hong Kong are formed by older Granitic rocks.

Lantau Peak is also the source of water for Tung Chung River, a major river on Lantau Island.

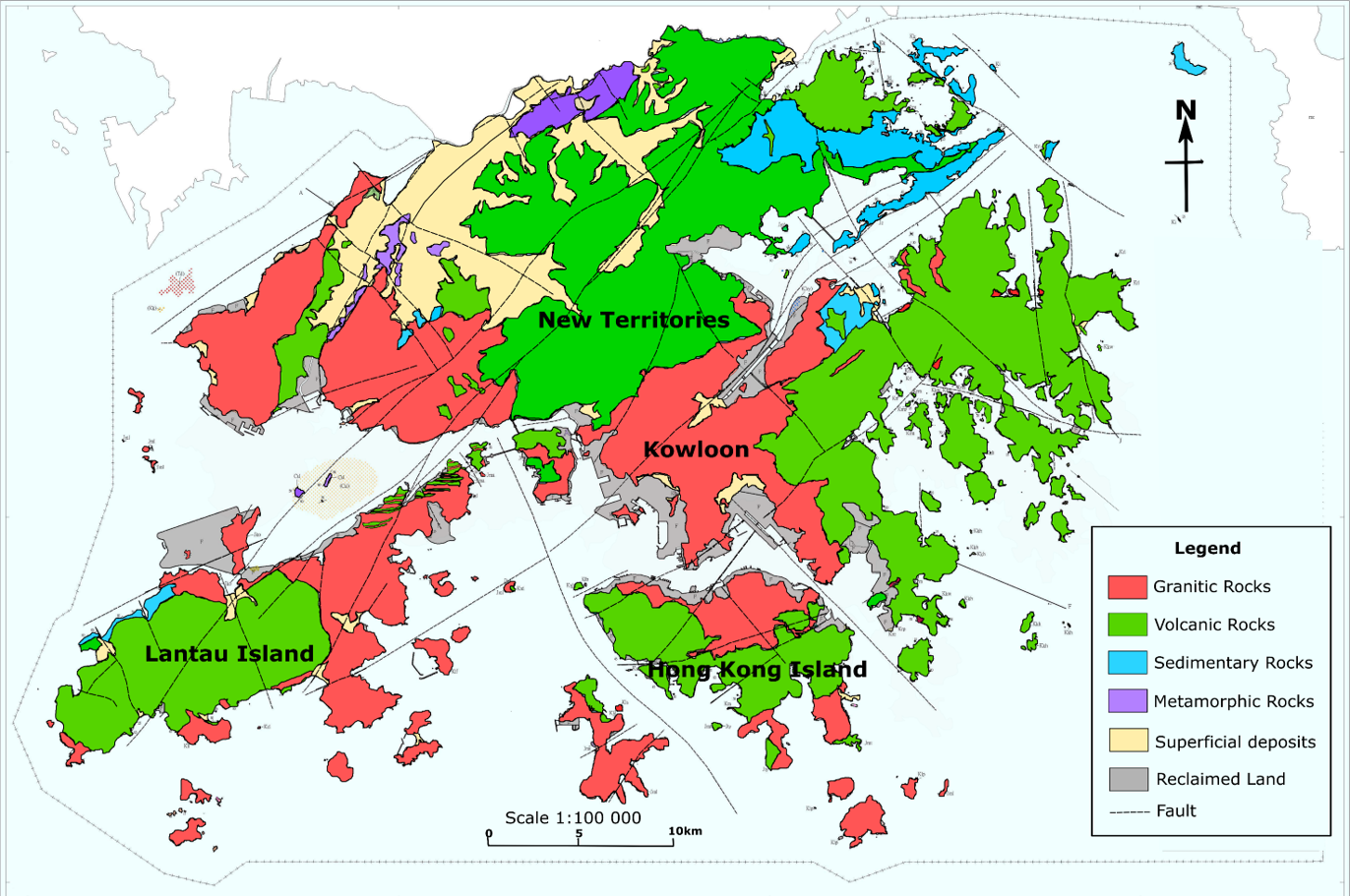
Geological map of Hong Kong showing the distribution of faults and different rock types in Hong Kong. Lantau Peak is in the Green area (Volcanic Rock) on Lantau Island

== Climate ==
Lantau Peak is located in central Lantau Island, with an elevation of 934 meters above sea level (23 metres shorter than Tai Mo Shan, Hong Kong's highest peak). Under the Köppen climate classification, Lantau Peak features a subtropical highland climate (Köppen: Cwb). Due to its elevation, strong winds and fog occur throughout the year. Winter is cold with temperatures often dipping below 0 °C; summer is warm with temperatures reaching tops of 18-22 °C; spring is cool and humid and autumn cool and dry. Because there is no weather station at the top of Lantau Peak (934m), the Ngong Ping Weather Station of the Hong Kong Observatory (593 m) can be used as reference for the temperature at the summit.

Climate data for Lantau Peak
Month	Jan	Feb	Mar	Apr	May	Jun	Jul	Aug	Sep	Oct	Nov	Dec	Year
Mean daily maximum °C (°F)	8.3 (46.9)	10.2 (50.4)	11.9 (53.4)	14.2 (57.6)	16.6 (61.9)	17.8 (64.0)	18.5 (65.3)	19.2 (66.6)	18.7 (65.7)	16.6 (61.9)	13.5 (56.3)	10.0 (50.0)	14.6 (58.3)
Daily mean °C (°F)	4.9 (40.8)	7.2 (45.0)	9.0 (48.2)	13.1 (55.6)	14.8 (58.6)	16.3 (61.3)	16.9 (62.4)	17.1 (62.8)	16.3 (61.3)	13.8 (56.8)	10.6 (51.1)	6.8 (44.2)	12.2 (54.0)
Mean daily minimum °C (°F)	2.3 (36.1)	4.9 (40.8)	6.8 (44.2)	10.0 (50.0)	13.1 (55.6)	14.7 (58.5)	15.3 (59.5)	15.3 (59.5)	14.5 (58.1)	11.9 (53.4)	8.4 (47.1)	4.2 (39.6)	10.1 (50.2)
Source: Climate Data for Lantau Peak — Hong Kong Observatory

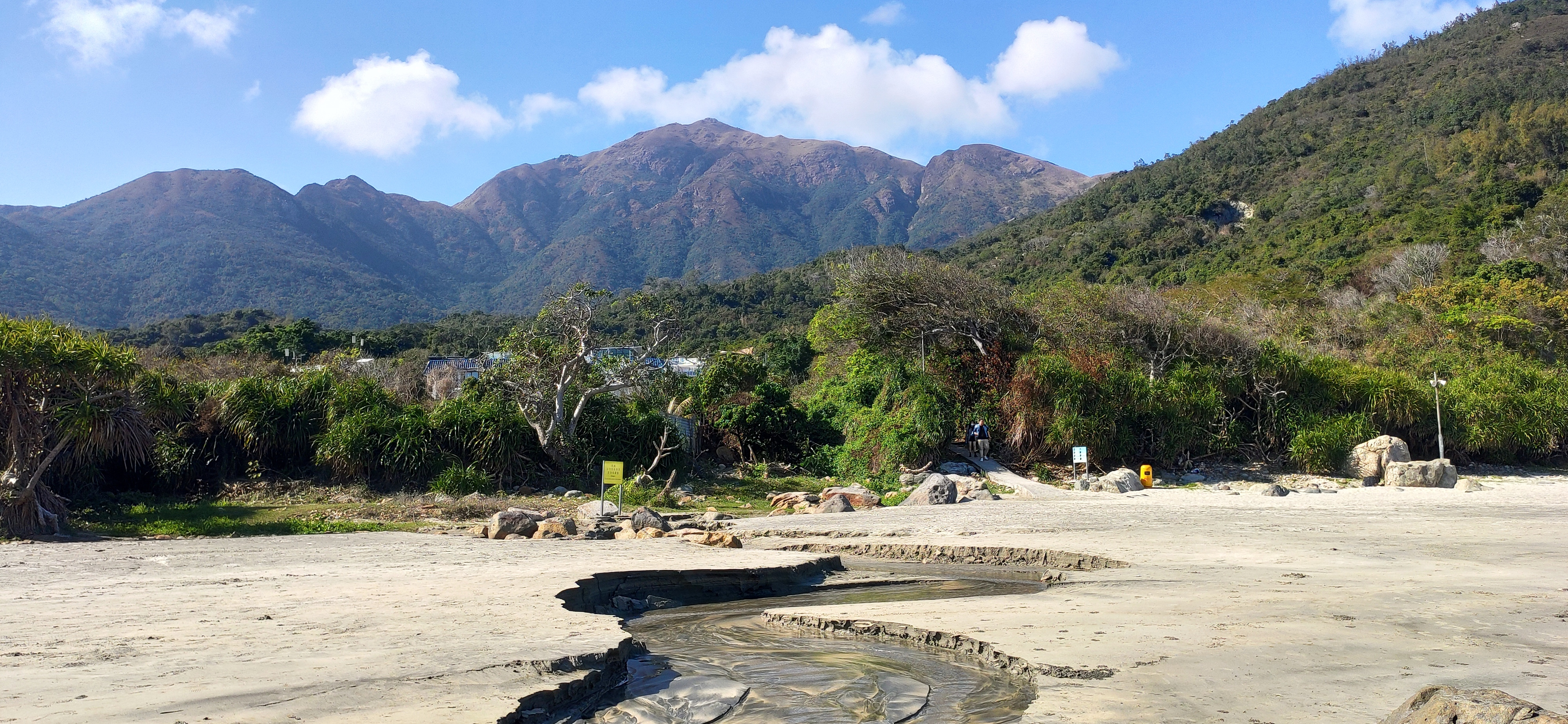
Lantau Peak (middle) and Kau Nga Ling (left)

== See also ==
- List of mountains, peaks and hills in Hong Kong
- Sunset Peak
- Yi Tung Shan
