= Site of Special Scientific Interest (Hong Kong) =

A Site of Special Scientific Interest (Chinese: 具特殊科學價值地點) or SSSI is a special area to protect wildlife, habitats and geographic features based on scientific interest in Hong Kong. Scientific interests are special features relating to animal life, plant life, geology and/or geography. After being identified by the Agriculture, Fisheries and Conservation Department, these areas are documented by the Planning Department and added to maps. From 1975 to 2005, 67 locations were designated SSSIs throughout Hong Kong.

== List of SSSIs ==
1. Yim Tso Ha Egretry 25/02/75. Delisted in March 2016.
2. Shing Mun Fung Shui Woodland 25/02/75
3. Tai Mo Shan Montane Forest Scrub 15/09/75
4. She Shan Fung Shui Woodland 15/09/75
5. Tai Tam Harbour (Inner Bay) 24/10/75
6. D'Aguilar Peninsula 24/10/75
7. Ma On Shan 23/06/76
8. Tsing Shan Tsuen 23/06/76 (delisted in 2008)
9. Sunset Peak 23/06/76
10. Mai Po Marshes 15/09/76
11. Bluff Island & Basalt Island 16/02/79
12. Port Island 16/02/79
13. Kat O Chau 16/02/79 (De-Designated on 1.3.2006)
14. Ninepin Group 16/02/79
15. Ping Chau* 16/02/79
16. Mai Po Village 16/02/79
17. Mau Ping 16/02/79
18. Pak Sha Wan Peninsula 16/02/79 (De-Designated on 1.8.2006)
19. Lai Chi Wo Beach 16/02/79
20. Ng Tung Chai 16/02/79
21. Pak Tai To Yan 20/09/79
22. Chiu Keng Tam 20/09/79
23. Tai Long Bay 20/09/79
24. Pok Fu Lam Reservoir Catchment Area 20/09/79
25. Tai Tam Reservoir Catchment Area 20/09/79
26. Beacon Hill 20/09/79
27. Ho Chung Valley 20/09/79
28. Lung Kwu Chau, Tree Island & Sha Chau 20/09/79
29. Castle Peak 5/02/80
30. Tai Mo Shan 5/02/80
31. Pak Nai 5/02/80
32. Man Cheung Po 5/02/80
33. Lantau Peak 5/02/80
34. Pat Sin Range 5/02/80
35. Fung Yuen Valley 5/02/80
36. South Lamma Island 5/02/80
37. Yim Tin Tsai & Ma Shi Chau* 24/09/82
38. Tolo Channel (Northern Coast)* 24/09/82
39. Centre Island* 24/09/82
40. Nai Chung Coast* 24/09/82
41. Tsim Bei Tsui 10/01/85
42. Ting Kok 1/03/85
43. Sham Chung Coast* 25/03/85
44. A Chau 9/04/85
45. Lai Chi Chong* 26/04/85
46. Inner Deep Bay 18/03/86
47. Tsim Bei Tsui Egretry 5/01/89
48. Hoi Ha Wan 5/01/89
49. Hok Tsui (Cape D'Aguilar)# 19/07/90
50. Nam Fung Road Woodland 22/06/93
51. Sam Mun Tsai Egretry 13/08/94 (De-Designated on 10.2.2010)
52. Shuen Wan Egretry 13/08/94
53. Tai Po Egretry 13/08/94
54. Lin Ma Hang Lead Mines 13/08/94
55. Tseng Tau Coast 13/08/94
56. Kei Ling Ha Mangal 13/08/94
57. Pok To Yan & Por Kai Shan 13/08/94
58. San Tau Beach 19/10/94
59. Sha Lo Tung 16/01/97
60. Shek O Headland* 3/02/98
61. San Chau, Lantau 4/05/99
62. Ngong Ping, Lantau 4/05/99
63. Tai Ho Stream, Lantau 5/05/99
64. Sham Wan, Lamma Island 3/06/99
65. South Tsing Yi 13/4/2005
66. Tai Om Fung Shui Woodland 30/12/2005
67. Shek Ngau Chau 30/12/2005
68. Lin Ma Hang Stream 6/07/2007
69. Siu Lang Shui 8/01/2008
70. Deep Water Bay Valley 12/02/2008
71. Lung Kwu Tan Valley 03/04/2012
72. Sunshine Island 27/02/2015

Note: Sites marked with asterisk (*) indicate designation for geological rather than biological interest. Sites marked with # indicate designation for geological and biological interest.

== See also ==
- SSSI, (Site of Special Scientific Interest). A similar terminology being used in United Kingdom, from which the SSSI of Hong Kong originates.
- Zapovednik, similar sites in the former USSR.
