= Sandbars in Hong Kong =

Sandbars in Hong Kong:

- Ap Lei Chau - Ap Lei Pai, Hong Kong
- Cheung Chau, Hong Kong
- Lung Kwu Chau, Hong Kong
- Pui O, Hong Kong
- Sha Chau, Hong Kong
- Shek O Headland - Tai Tau Chau, Hong Kong
- Yim Tin Tsai - Ma Shi Chau, Hong Kong

== See also ==
- Geography of Hong Kong
- Islands and peninsulas in Hong Kong
- Sandbar
- Isthmus
