= Sham Shek Tsuen =

Village in Hong Kong

Coordinates: 22.2775°N 113.890882°E

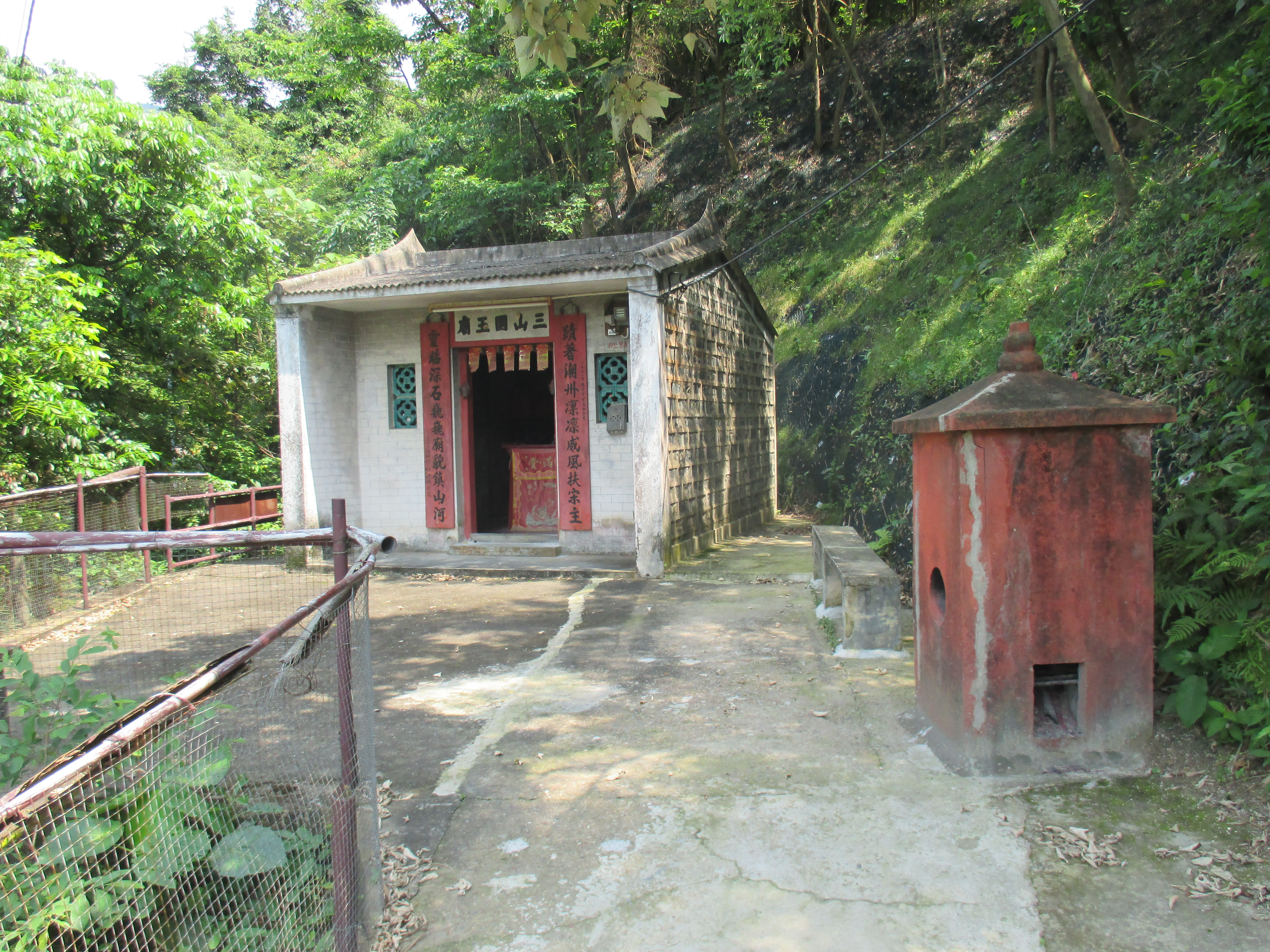
Sam Shan Kwok Wong Temple (深石村三山國王廟, Temple of the Three Mountain Kings), along Tung O Ancient Trail, in Sham Shek Tsuen.

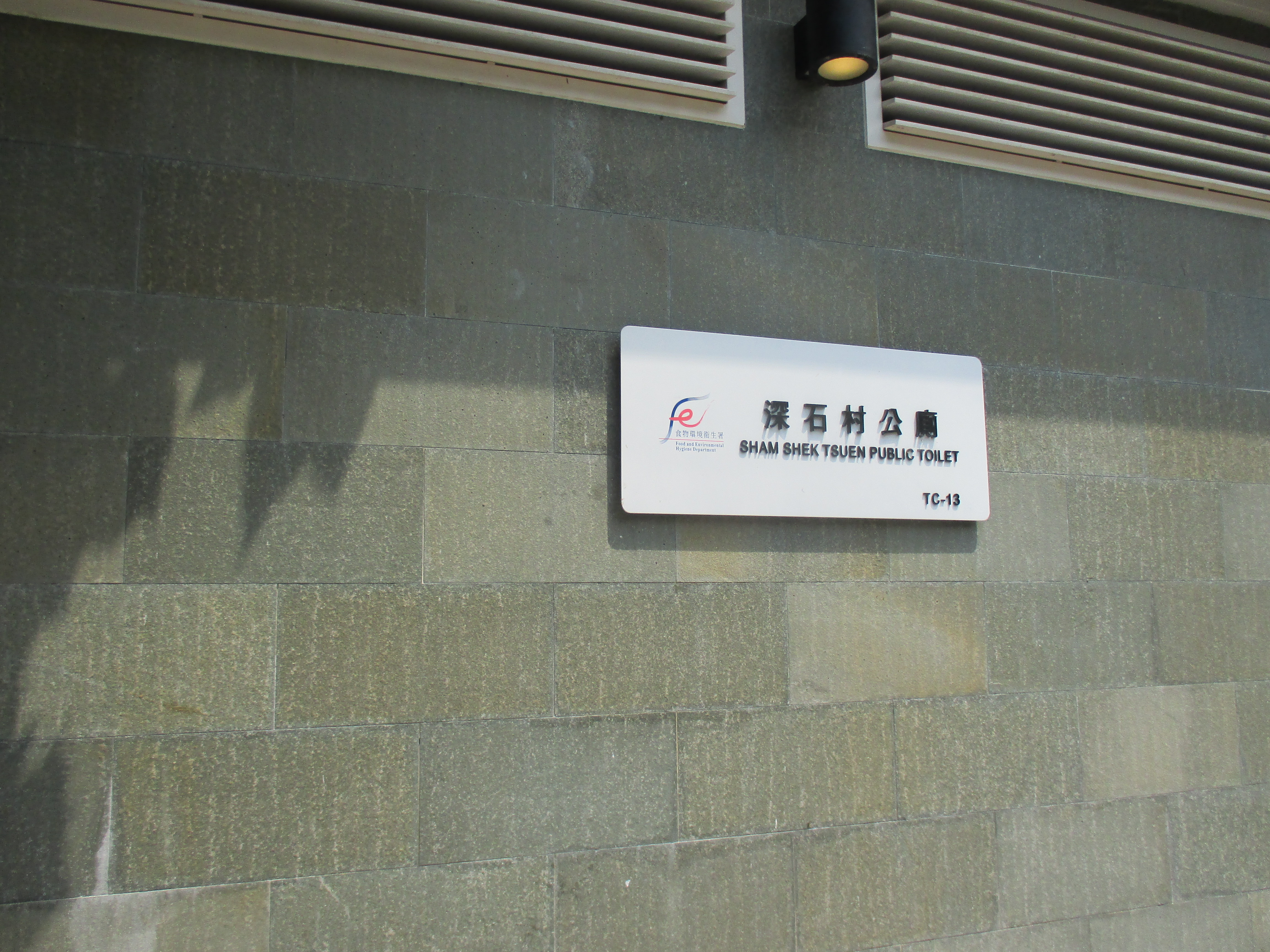
Sham Shek Public Toilet

Sham Shek Tsuen (Chinese: 深石村) is a village on Lantau Island, Hong Kong.

== History ==
Sham Shek Tsuen, named after the two local bays of Sham Wat and San Shek, was established in 1956. Most of its villagers came from Mainland China, primarily from Chaozhou and Shantou. Sham Shek was mostly mountainous, and there was not much flat land that could be used for rice cultivation. Moreover, rice cultivation in Hong Kong had gradually declined since the 1950s and 1960s, due to the influx of cheap white rice from other places (such as Australia and Thailand). Many farmers cultivating rice on Lantau Island thus abandoned farming, and some of them grew vegetables, raised livestock and planted fruit trees or operated orchards and pigsties instead.

== Access ==
Sham Shek Tsuen is located along Tung O Ancient Trail.
