= Sai Tso Wan =

There are several places in Hong Kong with the name Sai Tso Wan:

- Sai Tso Wan, Lantau on Lantau Island, New Territories, near Sham Wat.
- Sai Tso Wan, Kowloon in Kwun Tong District, Kowloon, near Lam Tin and Cha Kwo Ling.
- Sai Tso Wan, Tsing Yi on the Tsing Yi Island, New Territories
