= Tung O Ancient Trail =

Hiking trail in Hong Kong

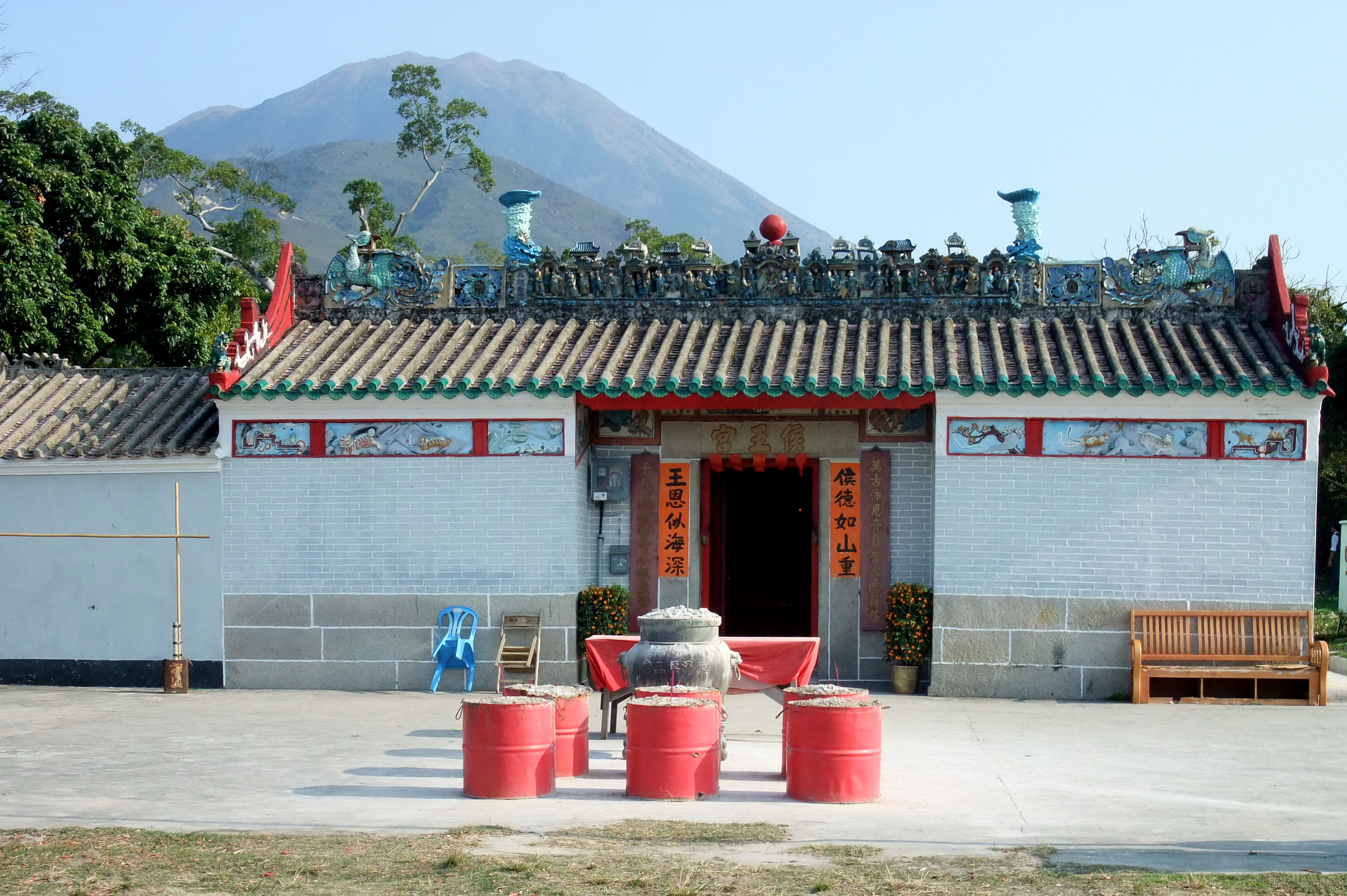
Hau Wong Temple in Tung Chung.

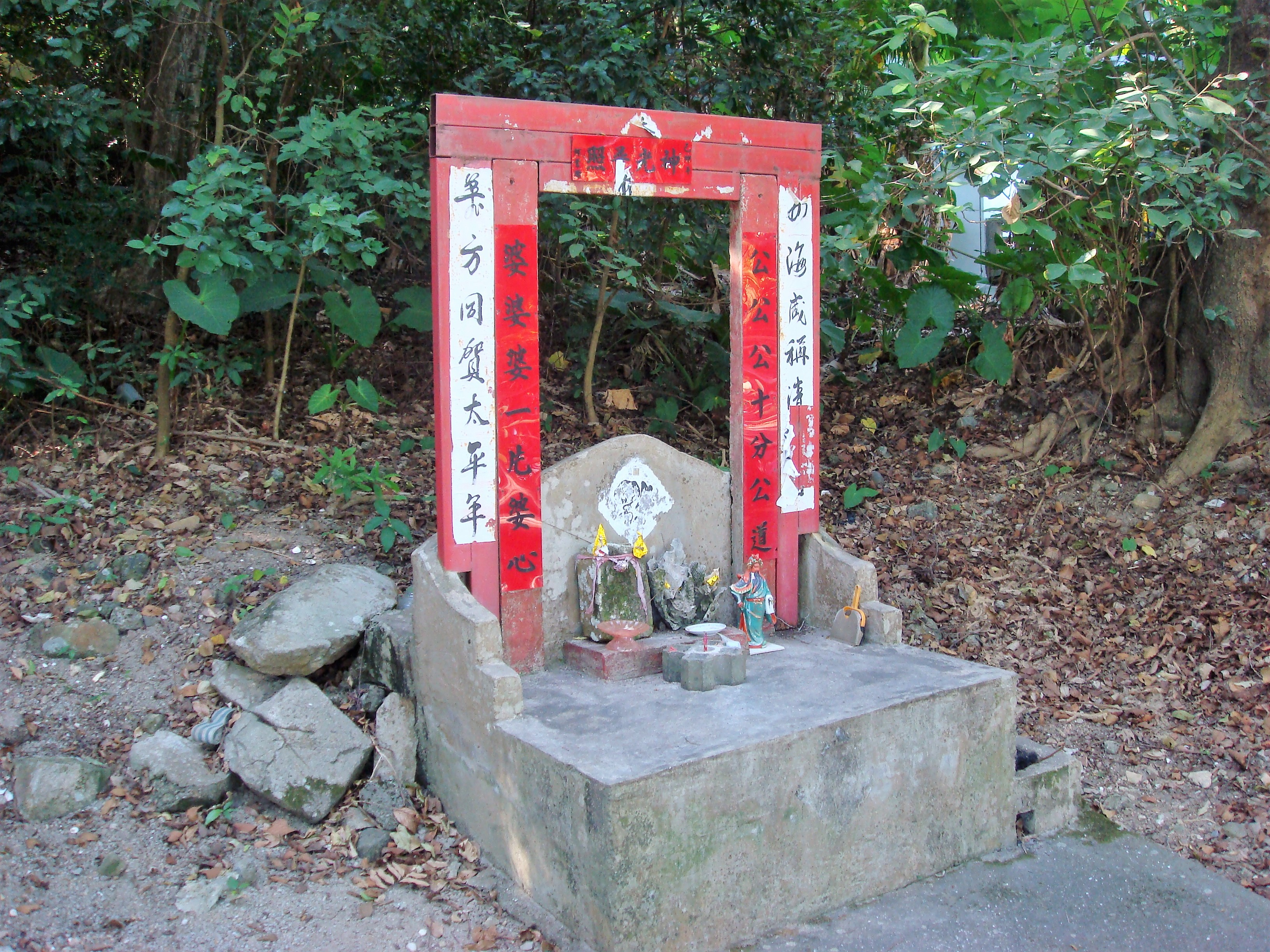
Shrine near San Tau, along Tung O Ancient Trail.

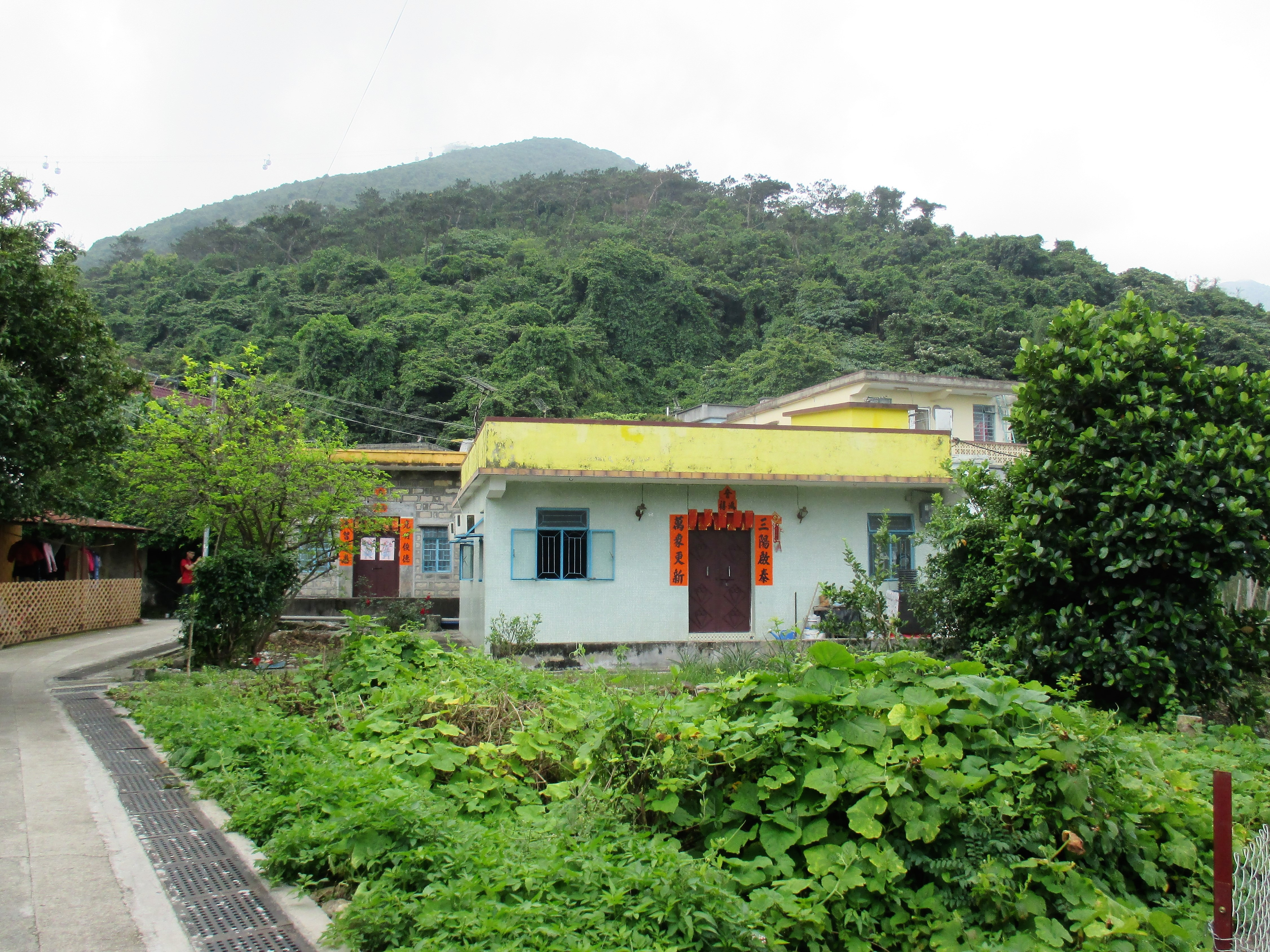
San Tau.

The Tung O Ancient Trail (Chinese: 東澳古道) on Lantau Island, Hong Kong, was once an important passage for villagers to commute between Tung Chung and Tai O. The coastal trail starts at modern Tung Chung in the east, passes mangroves and bays and ends in the traditional Tai O fishing village. About 10 km in length, it is one of the most popular walking trails in Northwest Lantau.

== Features ==
Places and features along the trail include (front east to west)

- Tung Chung
- Hau Wong Temple, Tung Chung (東涌侯王古廟)
- Tung Chung Playground (東涌遊樂場)
- San Tau
- Hau Hok Wan (鱟殼灣)
- Sha Lo Wan
- Sham Shek Tsuen
- Sham Wat
- Sai Tso Wan (茜草灣)
- Tit Tak Shue (鐵德樹)
- San Chau (新洲)
- Tai O

== See also ==
- List of hiking trails in Hong Kong
