= Platyhedylidae =

Scientific classification
- Kingdom: Animalia
- Phylum: Mollusca
- Class: Gastropoda
- Superorder: Sacoglossa
- Superfamily: Plakobranchoidea
- Family: Platyhedylidae; Salvini-Plawen, 1973

Synonyms
- Gascoignellidae Jensen, 1985

Family of gastropods

Platyhedylidae is a family of sacoglossan sea slugs, marine gastropod mollusks in the superfamily Platyhedylidae.

This family has no subfamilies.

== Genera and species ==
There are two genera in the family Platyhedylidae:

- Gascoignella - Jensen, 1985
  - Species Gascoignella aprica - Jensen, 1985
  - Species Gascoignella jabae - Swennen, 2001
  - Species Gascoignella nukuli - Swennen, 2001
- Platyhedyle - Salwini-Plawen, 1973 - type genus
  - Species Platyhedyle denudata - Salvini-Plawen, 1973
