= Tai Tau Chau (Southern District) =

Island in Hong Kong

Native name: 大頭洲
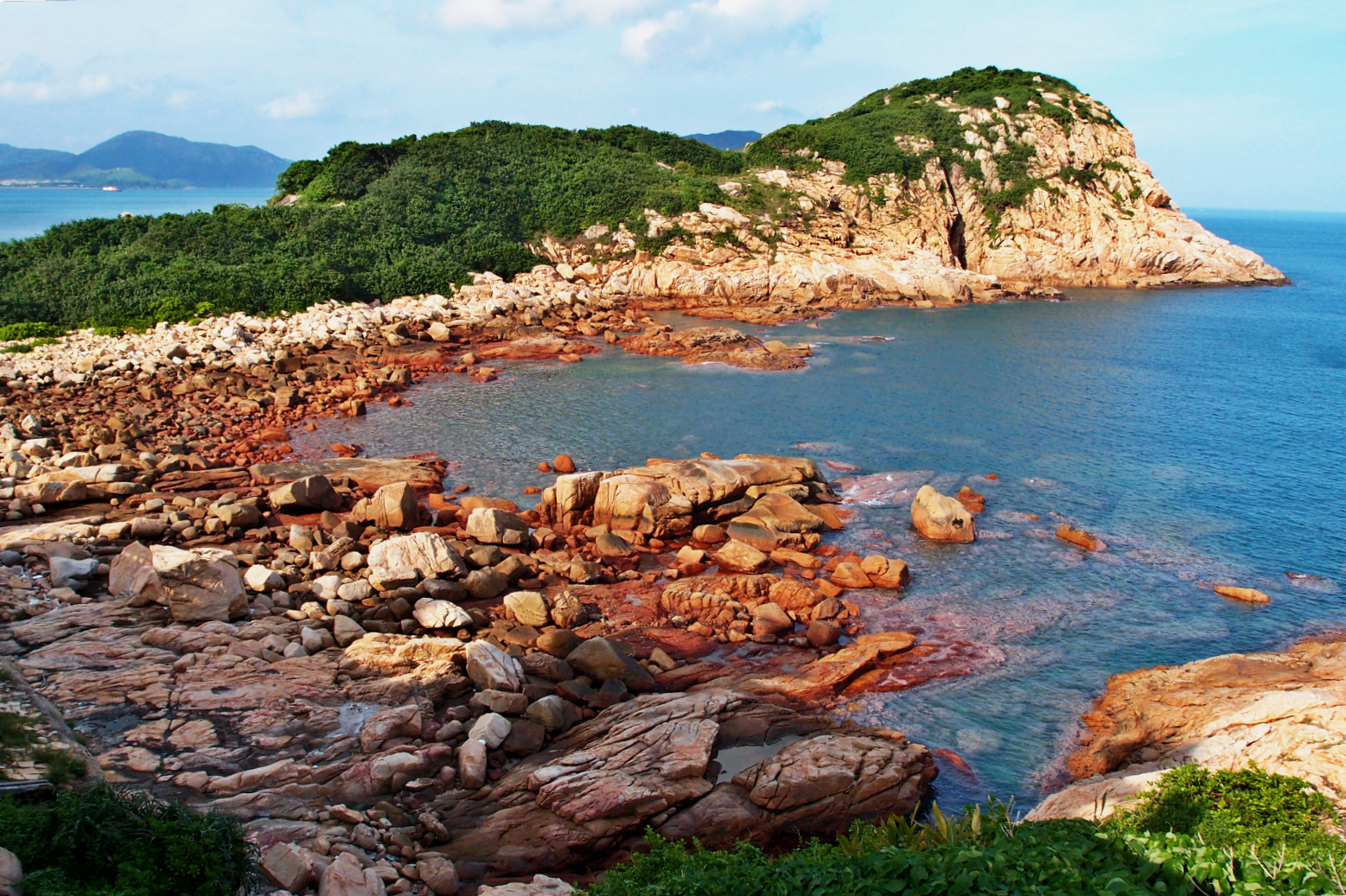
- View of Tai Tau Chau from Shek O in August 2015

- Location within Hong Kong

Geography
- Location: near Shek O, Hong Kong Island
- Coordinates: 22°13′48.58″N 114°15′30.67″E
- Adjacent to: Southern Waters of Hong Kong

Administration
- China
- SAR: Hong Kong
- Region: the Hong Kong Island
- District: the Southern District

Demographics
- Population: 0 (2019)

Additional information

Chinese name
- Traditional Chinese: 大頭洲
- Simplified Chinese: 大头洲
- Literal meaning: Big Head Island
Transcriptions
Standard Mandarin
- Hanyu Pinyin: Dàtóu zhōu
Yue: Cantonese
- Yale Romanization: Daaih tàuh jāu
- Jyutping: Daai6 tau4 zau1

Tai Tau Chau is an island in the Southern District, Hong Kong. Geographically, it is located in the southern Hong Kong Island. It connected to the Shek O Headland by a footbridge and a gravelbar (tombolo) under it. The island itself is uninhabited.

== Geography ==
On the sides of Tai Tau Chau and Shek O Headland were Island Bay and Shek O Wan (Rocky Bay) respectively. On the south of Tai Tau Chau is another island named Ng Fan Chau. Shek O Headland and Tai Tau Chau are evident as one rock formation, but were separated due to erosion, forming a tombolo between the headland and the island.

== History ==
The waters surrounding Tai Tau Chau and Shek O is a black spot for human smuggling and trafficking. On 11 October 1979, a boat from Meilong, Haifeng County (Chinese: 海丰县梅陇镇), Guangdong Province, had sunk near the island. It was reported that, as of 15 October 1979, 16 illegal immigrants from that boat were missing, of which a few swam to Shek O Beach and tried to sneak to the city centre, while the rest of them were presumed to have drowned. Police also caught and rescued an additional 22 illegal immigrants, plus 9 corpses were discovered. On 14 October 1979, another boat was discovered near the island, but the illegal immigrants escaped before the arrival of the police. At that time Hong Kong had a policy that once the illegal immigrants had reached the city centre without being caught, they could apply for Hong Kong identity cards. The policy was terminated in 1980.

In 1982, another 15 illegal immigrants arrived at Tai Tau Chau by using a sampan.

== Facilities ==
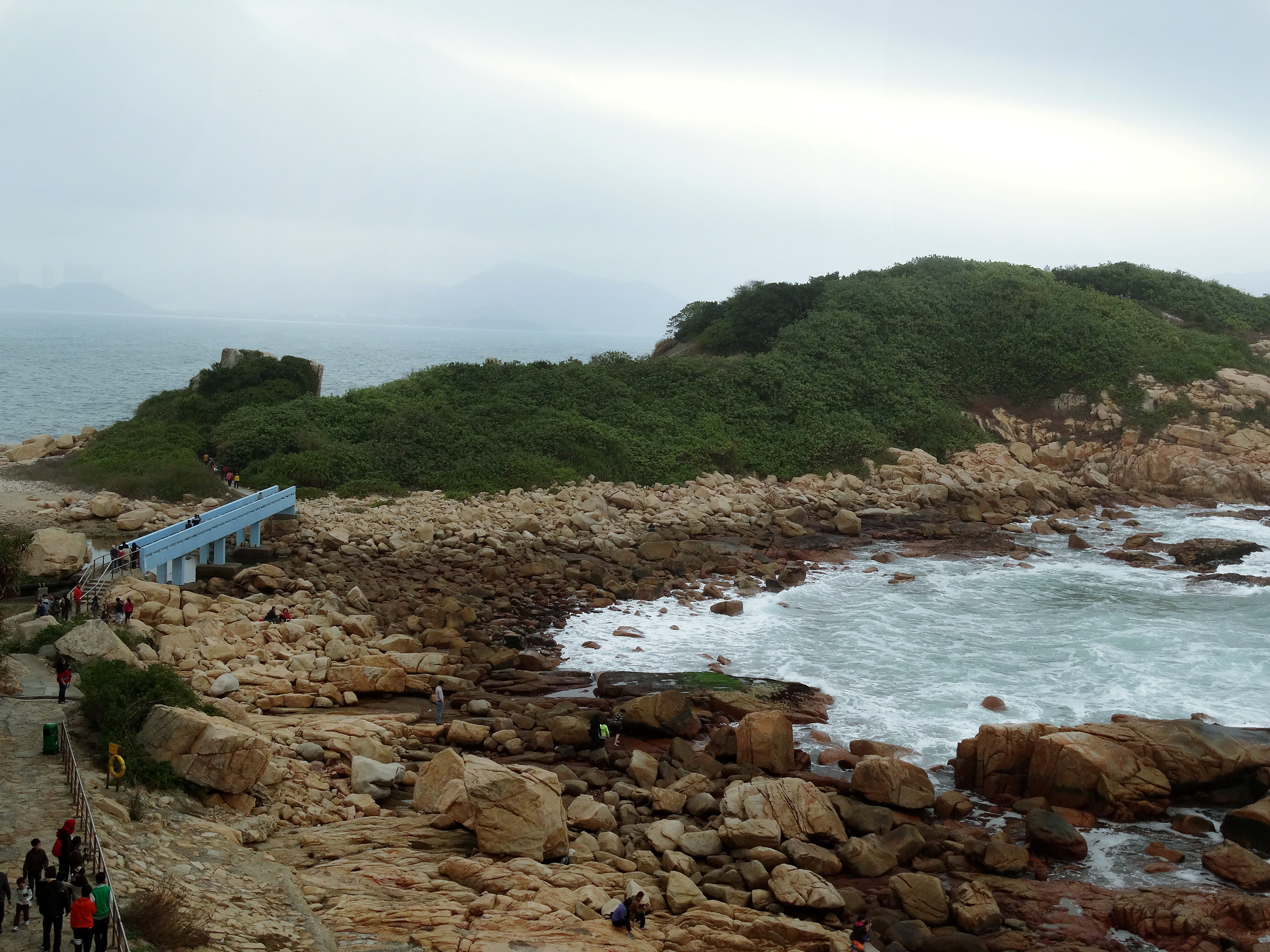
View ofba Tai Tau Chau and the footbridge from Shek O in February 2015

Tai Tau Chau has footpaths for hikers. It is part of Shek O Headland Picnic Area. Accidents were also reported. For example, a rock climber injured her legs when falling from the cliff of the island in 1977. In 1990, another rock climber was rescued by a firefighter.

The island used to be connected to Shek O Headland by a footbridge, as well as a tombolo that would be covered by water during high tides. The bridge was destroyed by a typhoon in 2018, but has been rebuilt since then.

Along the bridge deck, a waste water pipe was installed to transport waste water from Shek O Preliminary Treatment Works to the island and then release to the Tathong Channel. The pipe was also destroyed in that typhoon and the waste water had polluted the beach nearby.
