= San Tau =

Village of Hong Kong

Coordinates: 22.287818°N 113.921492°E

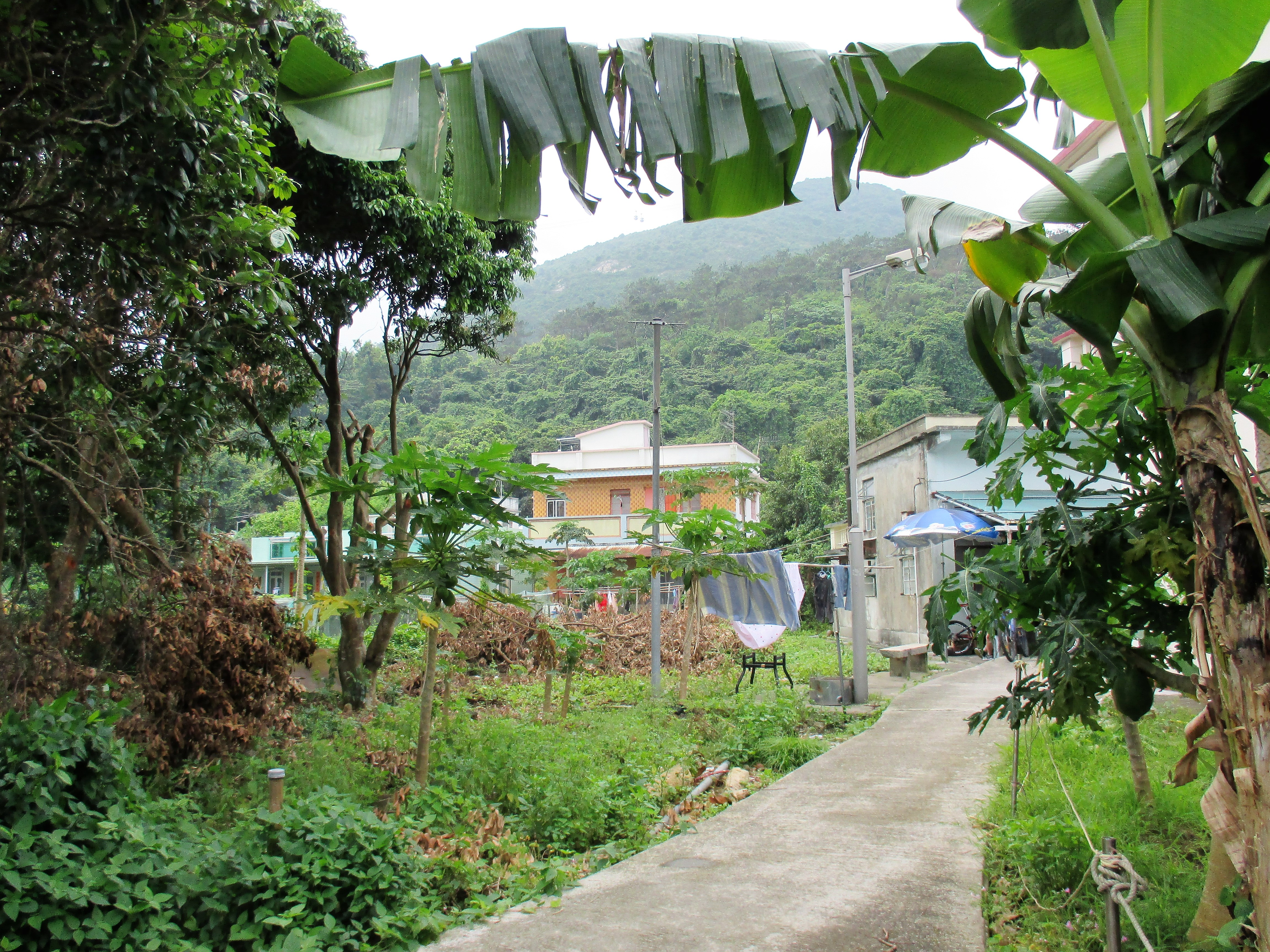
San Tau.

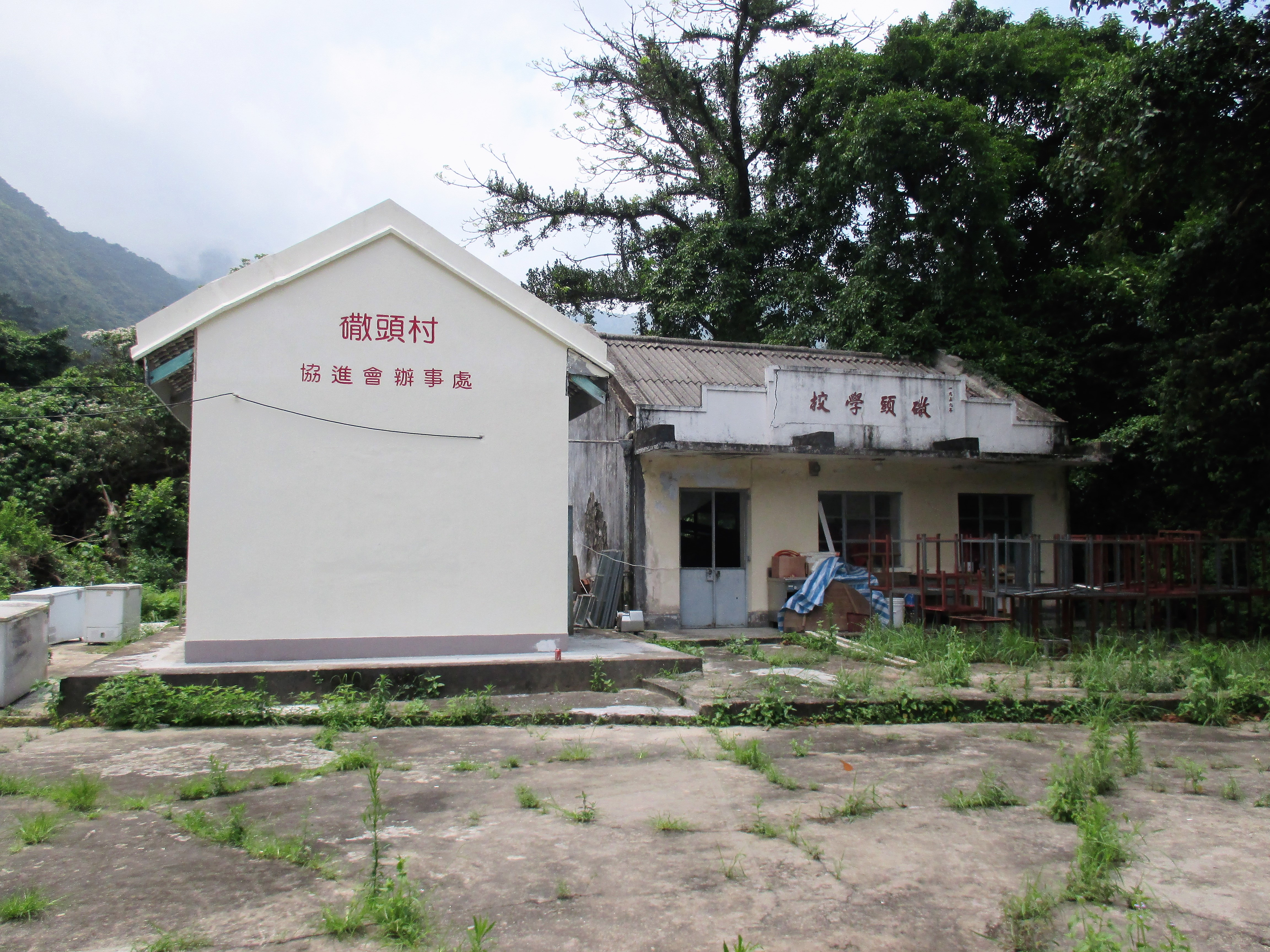
Former San Tau School (䃟頭學校).

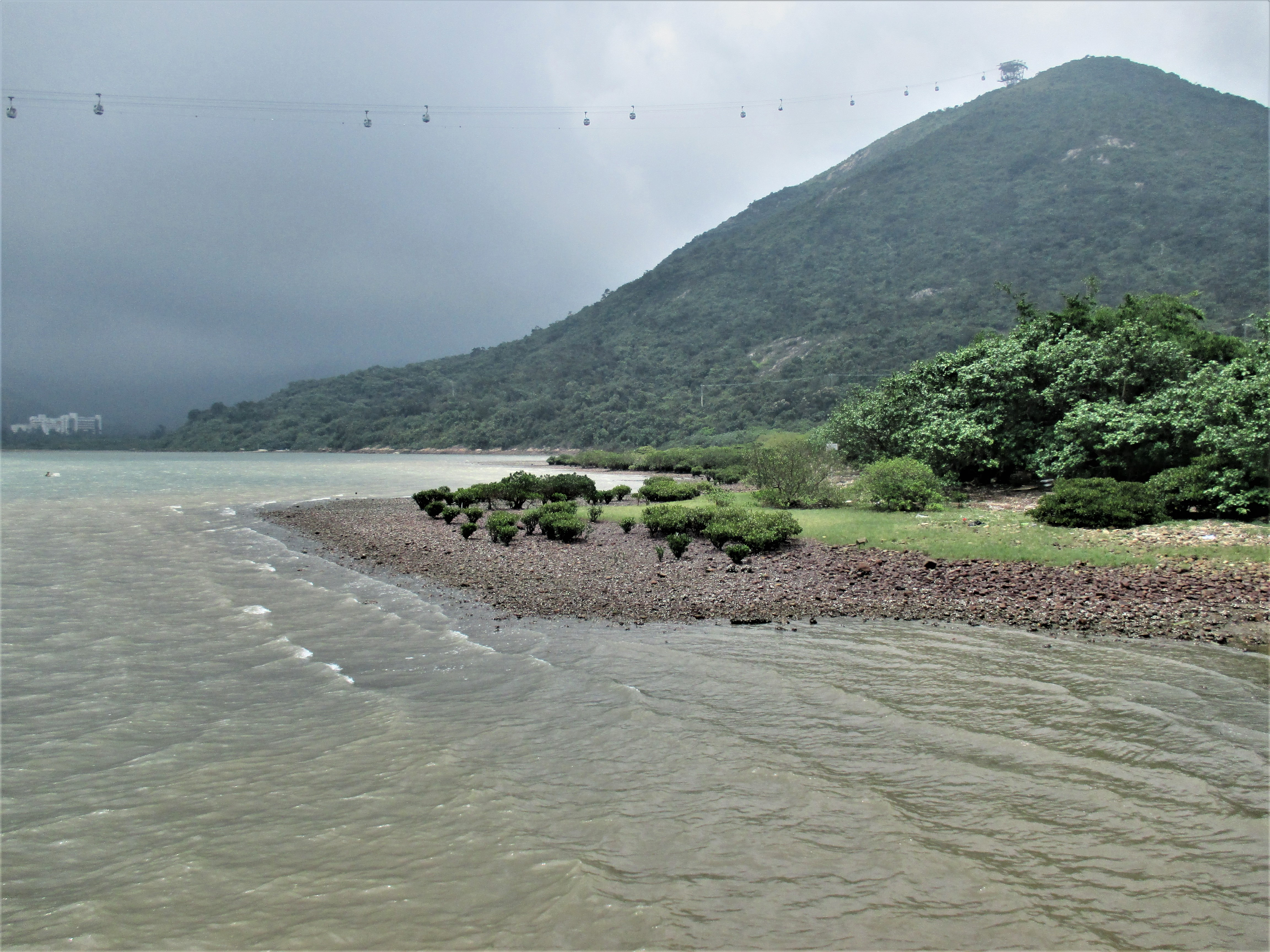
San Tau Beach Site of Special Scientific Interest (SSSI) along Tung Chung Bay. The Ngong Ping 360 gondola lift is visible in the upper part of the picture.

San Tau (Chinese: 䃟頭) is a village on Lantau Island, Hong Kong.

== Administration ==
San Tau is a recognized village under the New Territories Small House Policy.

== Conservation ==
San Tau Beach, a shallow sheltering beach on the west coast of Tung Chung Bay, covering an area of 2.7 hectares, was designated as a Site of Special Scientific Interest in 1994.

== Access ==
San Tau is located along Tung O Ancient Trail.

== See also ==
- List of coin hoards in China
