= Gascoignella =

Scientific classification
- Kingdom: Animalia
- Phylum: Mollusca
- Class: Gastropoda
- Superorder: Sacoglossa
- Family: Platyhedylidae
- Genus: Gascoignella; Jensen, 1985

Genus of gastropods

Gascoignella is a genus of sacoglossan sea slugs, marine gastropod mollusks in the family Platyhedylidae. This genus was first described in 1985 by Kathe Jensen.

== Species ==
Species within the genus Gascoignella include:

- Gascoignella aprica Jensen, 1985
- Gascoignella jabae Swennen, 2001
- Gascoignella nukuli Swennen, 2001
