= Gascoignella aprica =

Scientific classification
- Kingdom: Animalia
- Phylum: Mollusca
- Class: Gastropoda
- Superorder: Sacoglossa
- Family: Platyhedylidae
- Genus: Gascoignella
- Species: G. aprica

Binomial name
- Gascoignella aprica Jensen, 1985

Species of gastropod

Gascoignella aprica is a species of sea slug, a marine gastropod mollusk. It was first described in 1985 by Kathe Jensen from Tsim Bei Tsui, Hong Kong.

== Description ==
Gascoignella aprica grows to a length of about 1 centimetre (0.39 in). It has no rhinophores, cerata or parapodia which distinguishes it from other similar species. The dorsal surface is black, the head deep grey with the eyes surrounded by transparent yellowish areas. The sole of the foot is yellowish-white and the visceral mass is greenish because of the vegetable matter it contains. The head and foot are distinctly separated from the visceral mass.

== Habitat ==
Gascoignella aprica was found grazing on matted green algae Chaetomorpha sp. in the intertidal zone. The sea slugs were resistant to desiccation on the wet algae but soon dried up when exposed to the sun in the open.
