= Sha Chau and Lung Kwu Chau Marine Park =

Marine park in Hong Kong

Coordinates: 22.3634°N 113.8826°E

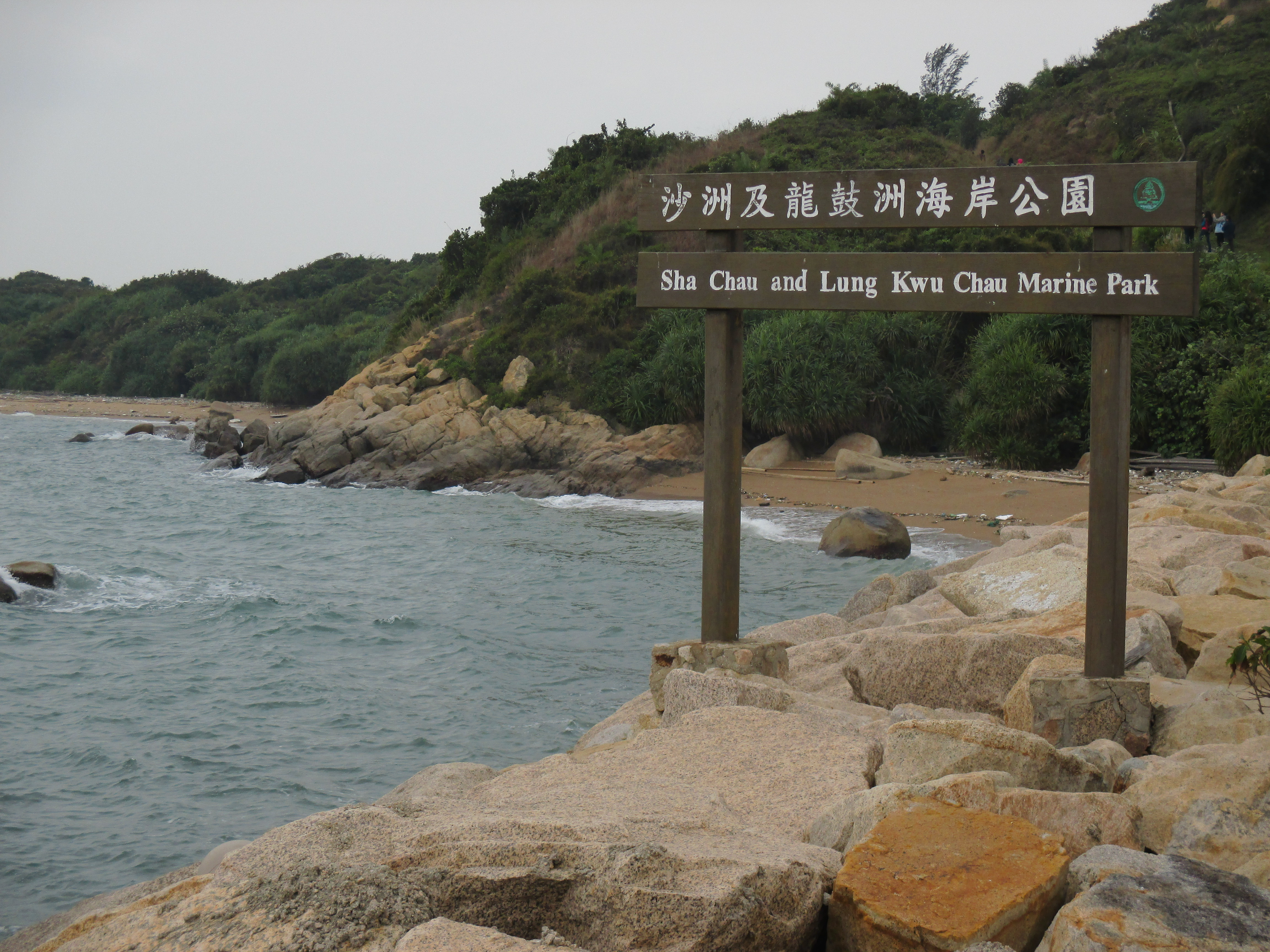
Sign on Tai Sha Chau, one of the islands of Sha Chau.

Map of the Sha Chau and Lung Kwu Chau Islands

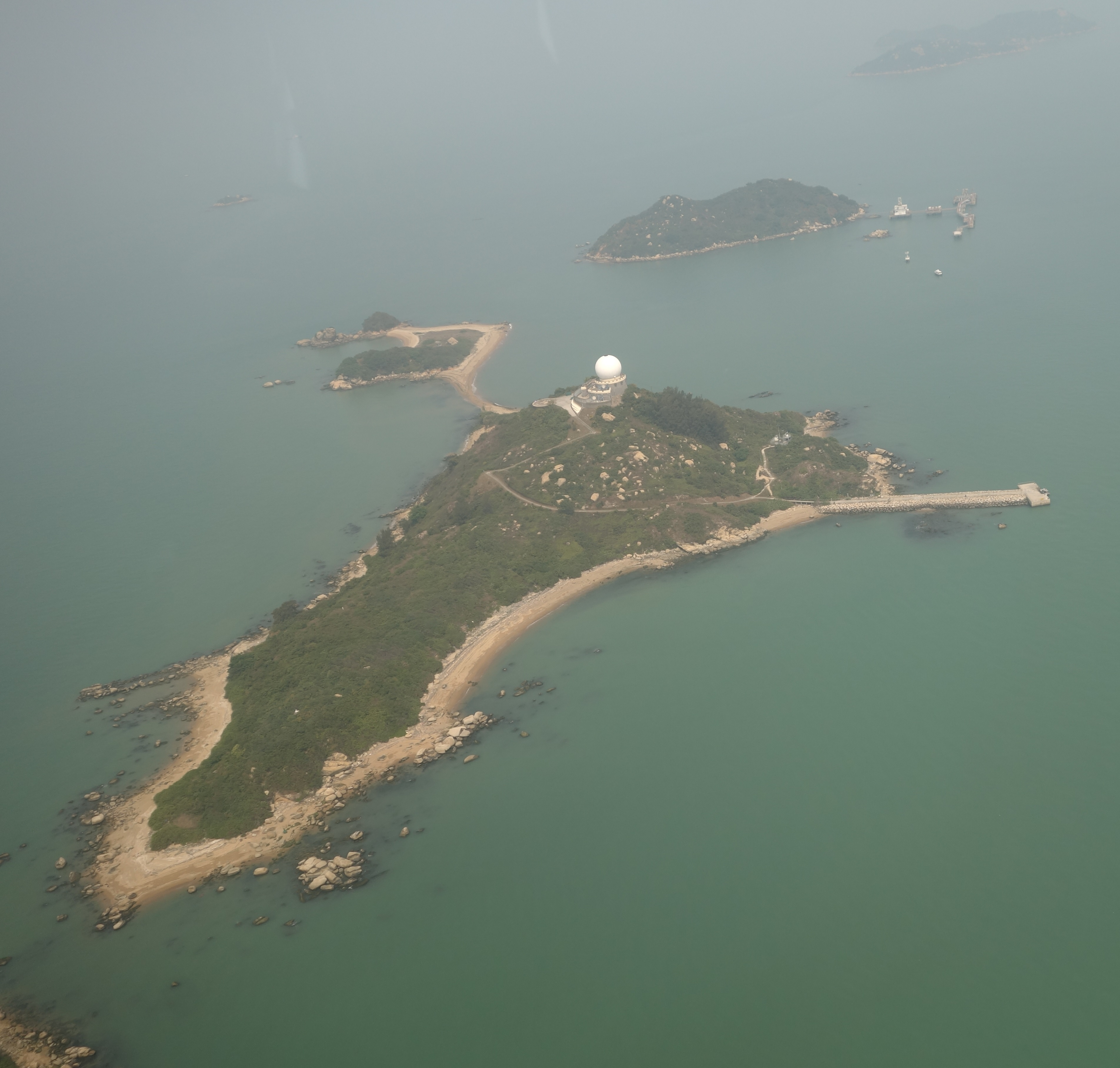
The island of Sha Chau and Lung Kwu Chau Marine Park

Sha Chau and Lung Kwu Chau Marine Park (Chinese: 沙洲及龍鼓洲海岸公園) is a marine park located on the west waters of Hong Kong, China. With an area of 1,200 hectares (3,000 acres), the Sha Chau and Lung Kwu Chau Marine Park has a variety of sea life due to the richness of nutrients in the water. The islands of Lung Kwu Chau, Sha Chau and Pak Chau (Tree island) are located within the boundaries of the park.

== Description ==
The Sha Chau and Lung Kwu Chau Marine Park is located off Hong Kong to the west of New Territories and was protected starting on 22 November 1996. An area of about 1,200 hectares (3,000 acres) has been protected. Yellow buoys on the four corners of the marine park are used to mark itsboundaries.

== Fauna and flora ==
Under the influence of the Pearl River on the west, the water has a low salinity level and high organic nutrients. This is also increases the diversity of marine fauna and flora, and also provides the perfect area for sea creatures to live in. The Sha Chau and Lung Kwu Chau Marine Parks is for its richness in marine resources and its habitat for the rare Chinese white dolphin (Sousa chinensis chinensis).

== Sha Chau ==
On Sha Chau, a noted scenic spot is the Tin Hau Temple. This temple was built during the Qing dynasty in the year 1846. Fishermen and other people who worked at sea came to this temple to pray to Mazu, Goddess of the Sea.
