= Pok To Yan =

Mountain in Hong Kong

- 薄刀屻
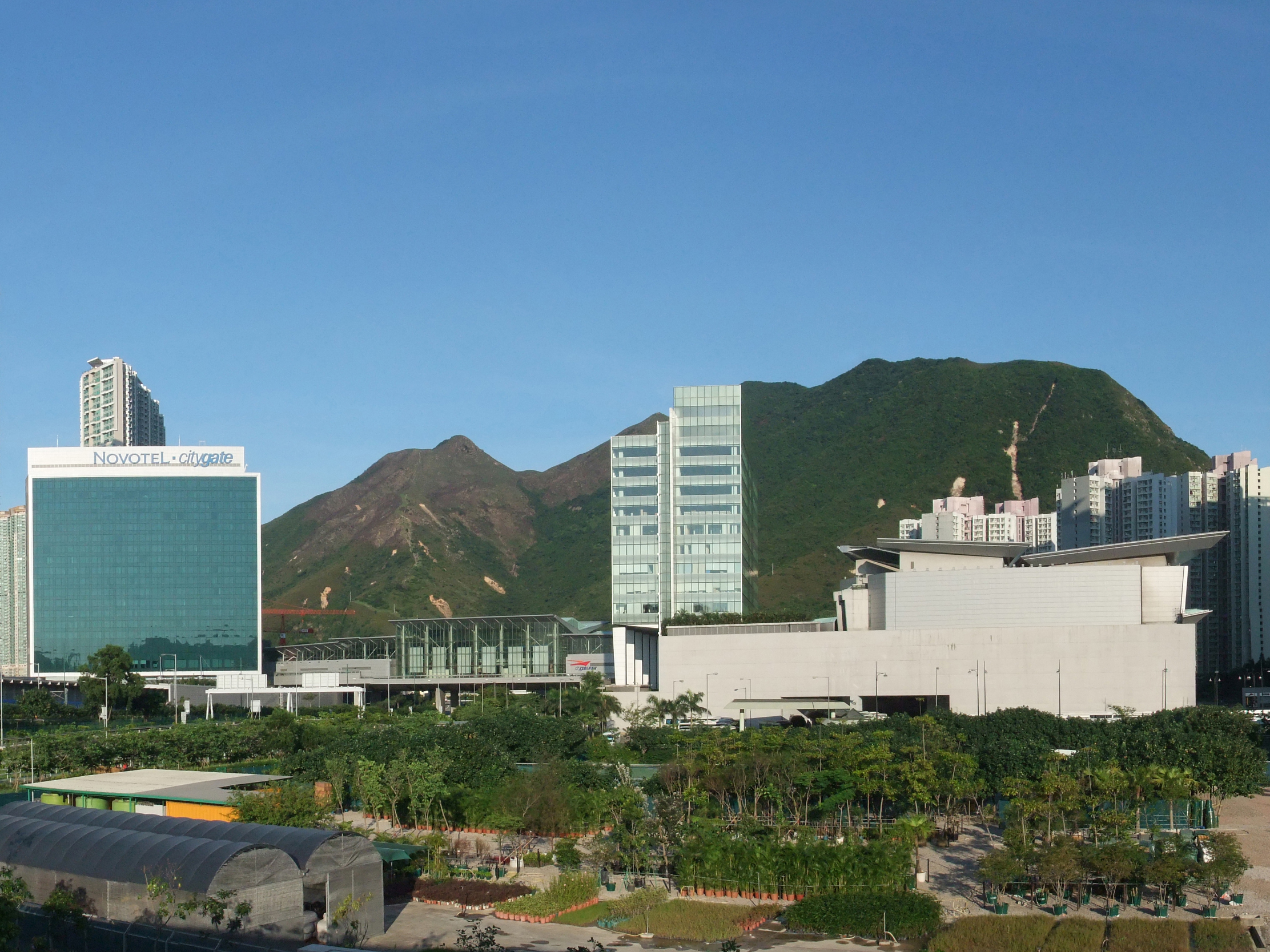
- On the right is Pok To Yan.

Highest point
- Elevation: 529 m (1,736 ft)
- Coordinates: 22°16′55″N 113°57′24″E

Geography
- Location within Hong Kong
- Location: Lantau Island, Hong Kong

Pok To Yan (Chinese: 薄刀屻, literally "Thin Razor's Edge") is a mountain on Lantau Island, Hong Kong, with a height of 529 metres (1,736 ft) above sea level.

== Geology ==
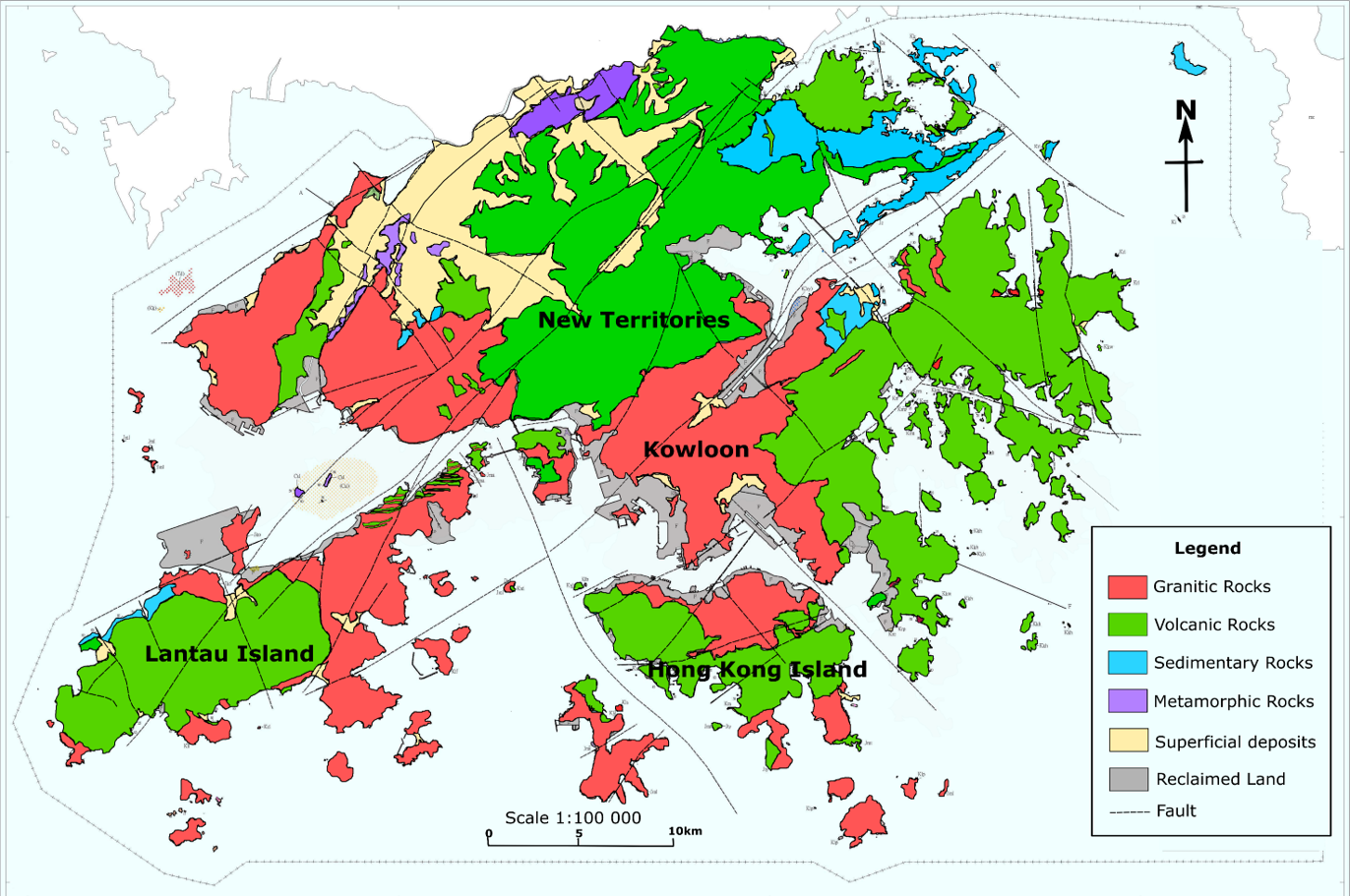
Pok To Yan is in the green area on Lantau Island.

Pok To Yan is formed by volcanic rocks, much like many of the tallest mountains on Lantau Island, such as Lantau Peak.

== Flora ==
Pok To Yan and neighbouring Por Kai Shan were designated together a "Site of Special Scientific Interest" in 1994. According to the local government, Pok To Yan has "over 200 species of native plants." and "a number of rare and protected indigenous plants".

== Geography ==
To the northwest is Tung Chung, while to the south is Sunset Peak.

== See also ==
- List of mountains, peaks and hills in Hong Kong
