= Tsim Bei Tsui =

Area of Hong Kong

Coordinates: 22.485°N 114.01°E

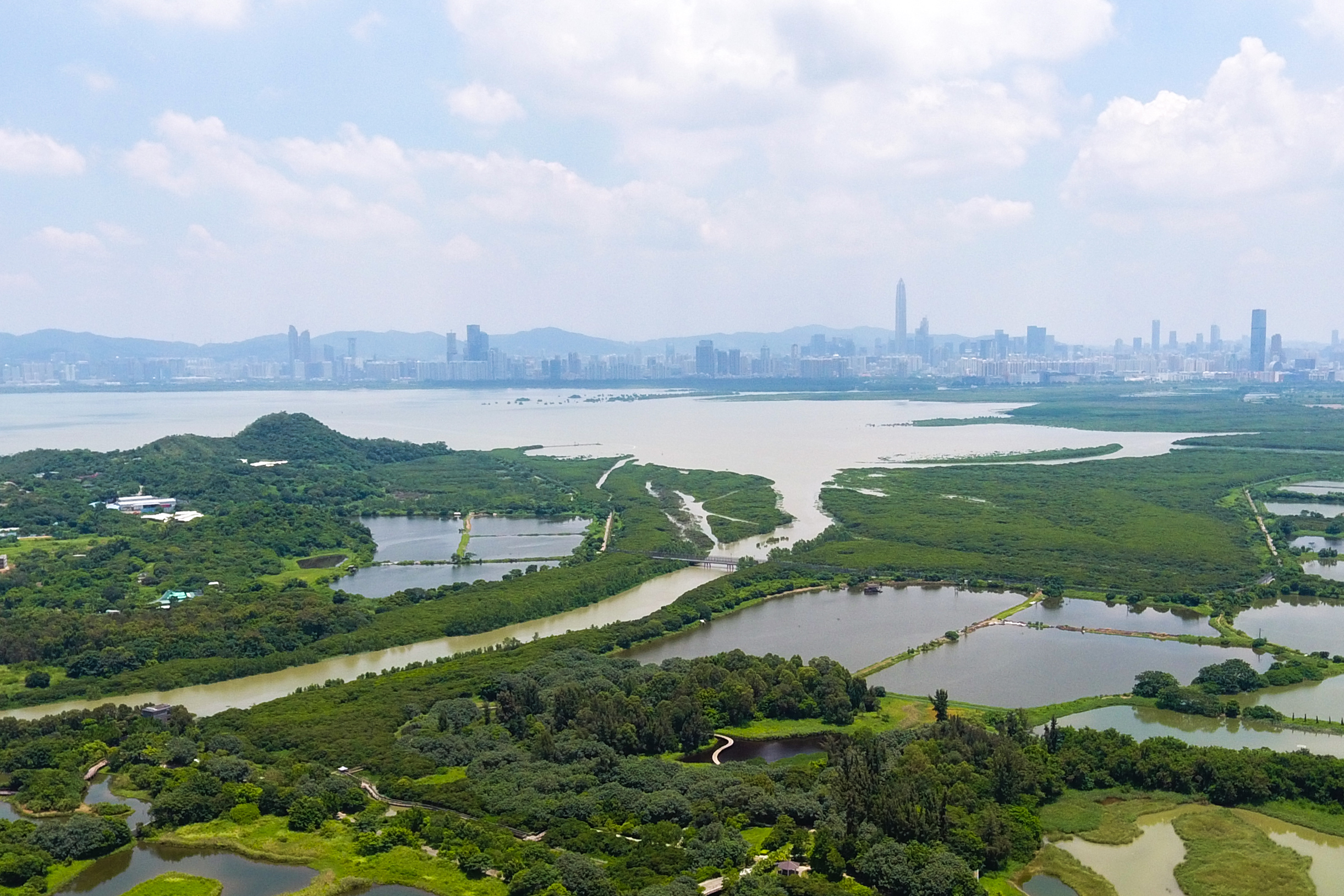
View of Tsim Bei Tsui facing Deep Bay, with the Shenzhen skyline in the background.

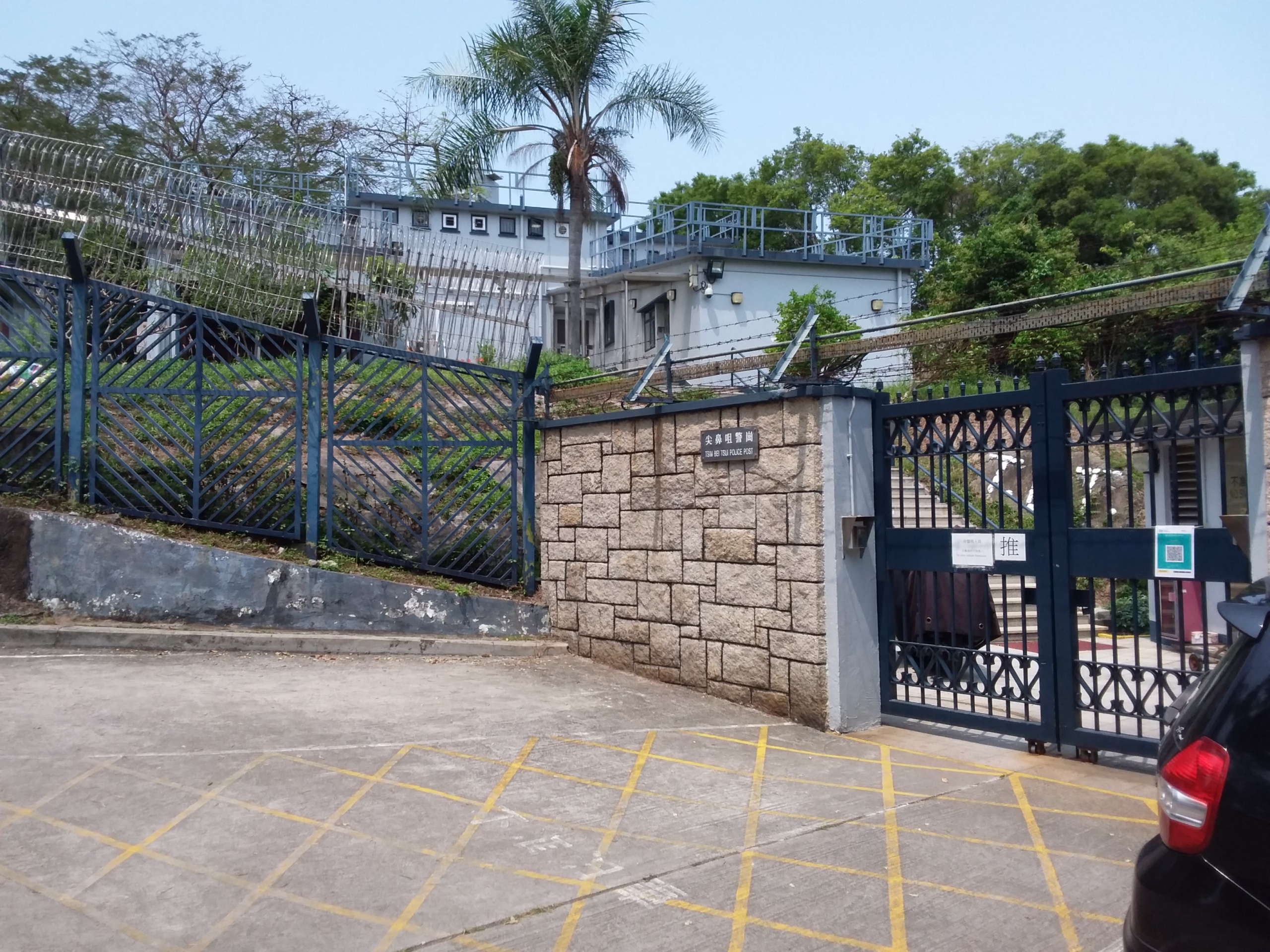
Tsim Bei Tsui Police Post.

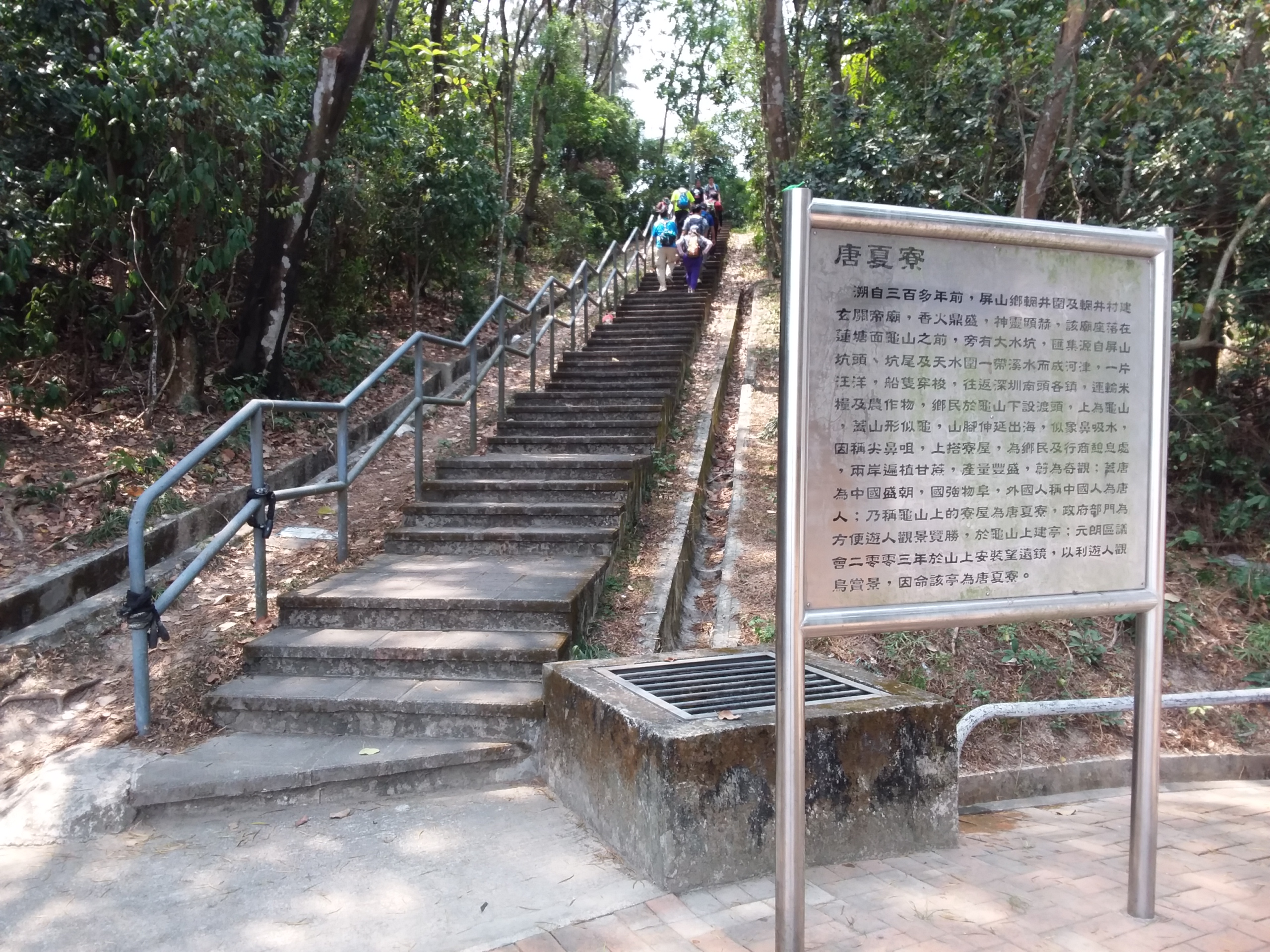
Stairs leading to the top of Kwai Shan.

Tsim Bei Tsui (Chinese: 尖鼻咀; lit. 'nose-tip headland') is an area of Yuen Long District in the northwestern part of the New Territories in Hong Kong, facing Deep Bay.

== Geography ==
The area is the estuary of the Tin Shui Wai, Shan Pui and Kam Tin rivers.

Kwai Shan (Chinese: 龜山; lit. 'Turtle Hill') is a 71 m high hill located in Tsim Bei Tsui and named after its shape.

== Conservation ==
Two parts of Tsim Bei Tsui were designated as Sites of Special Scientific Interest in 1985 and 1989 respectively. The first one features mangrove. It has an area of 2.5 ha and is located along the seafront. The second one, referred to as the 'Tsim Bei Tsui Egretry', has an area of 4.8 ha and features two feng shui groves. It is located south of Tsim Bei Tsui and east of Mong Tseng Wai.

== See also ==
- Gascoignella aprica
