= Pak Chau =

Island of Hong Kong

Native name: 白洲
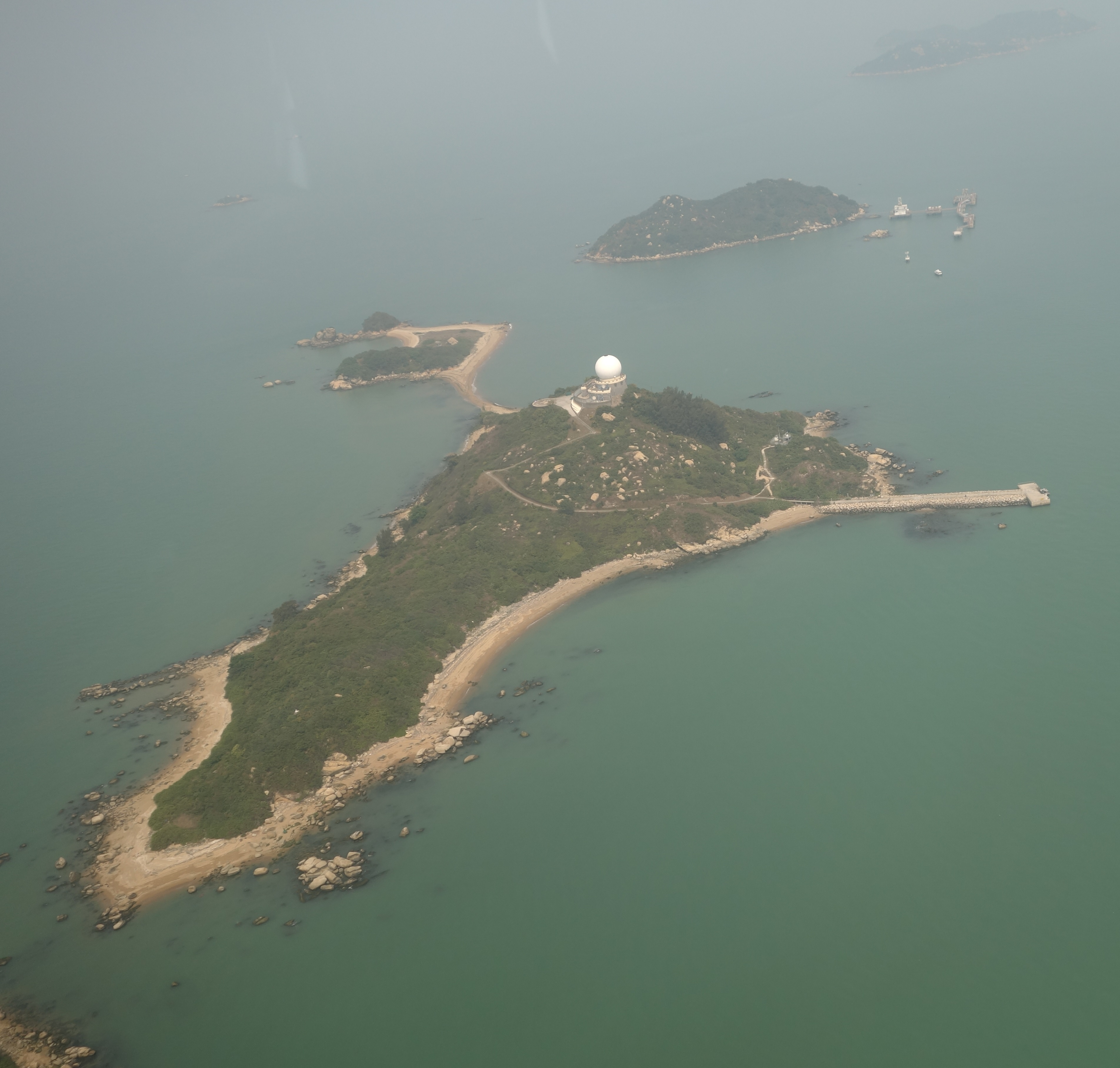
- Pak Chau is faintly visible to northwest of Sha Chau

- Location within Hong Kong

Geography
- Coordinates: 22.3502°N 113.8667°E

Administration
- Hong Kong (special administrative region)
- District: Tuen Mun
- Statutorily-defined area: New Territories
- Sovereign state: People's Republic of China

Pak Chau (Chinese: 白洲) or Tree Island is an island at the northwest water of Hong Kong. It is offshore of Lung Kwu Tan near Tuen Mun in the New Territories.

== Conservation ==
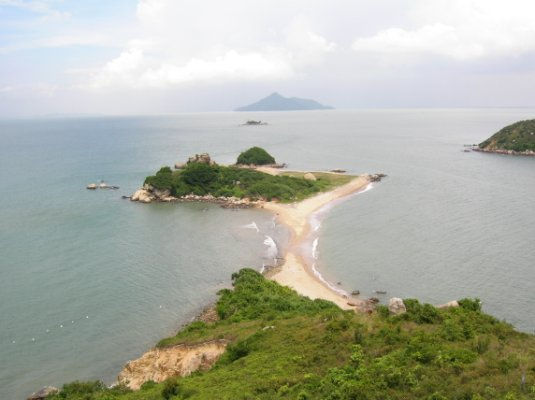
Pak Chau near the middle of the picture, between Tai Sha Chai and Siu Sha Chau in the foreground and Lintin Island in the far background

Since 1996, the island, Lung Kwu Chau, and Sha Chau are within the boundaries of the Sha Chau and Lung Kwu Chau Marine Park. The three islands have been listed as a Site of Special Scientific Interest since 1979. It is known as a dolphin sanctuary and a habitat for the Chinese white dolphin.

== See also ==
- Islands of Hong Kong
