= Sha Chau =

Island of Hong Kong

Coordinates: 22.3449°N 113.8897°E

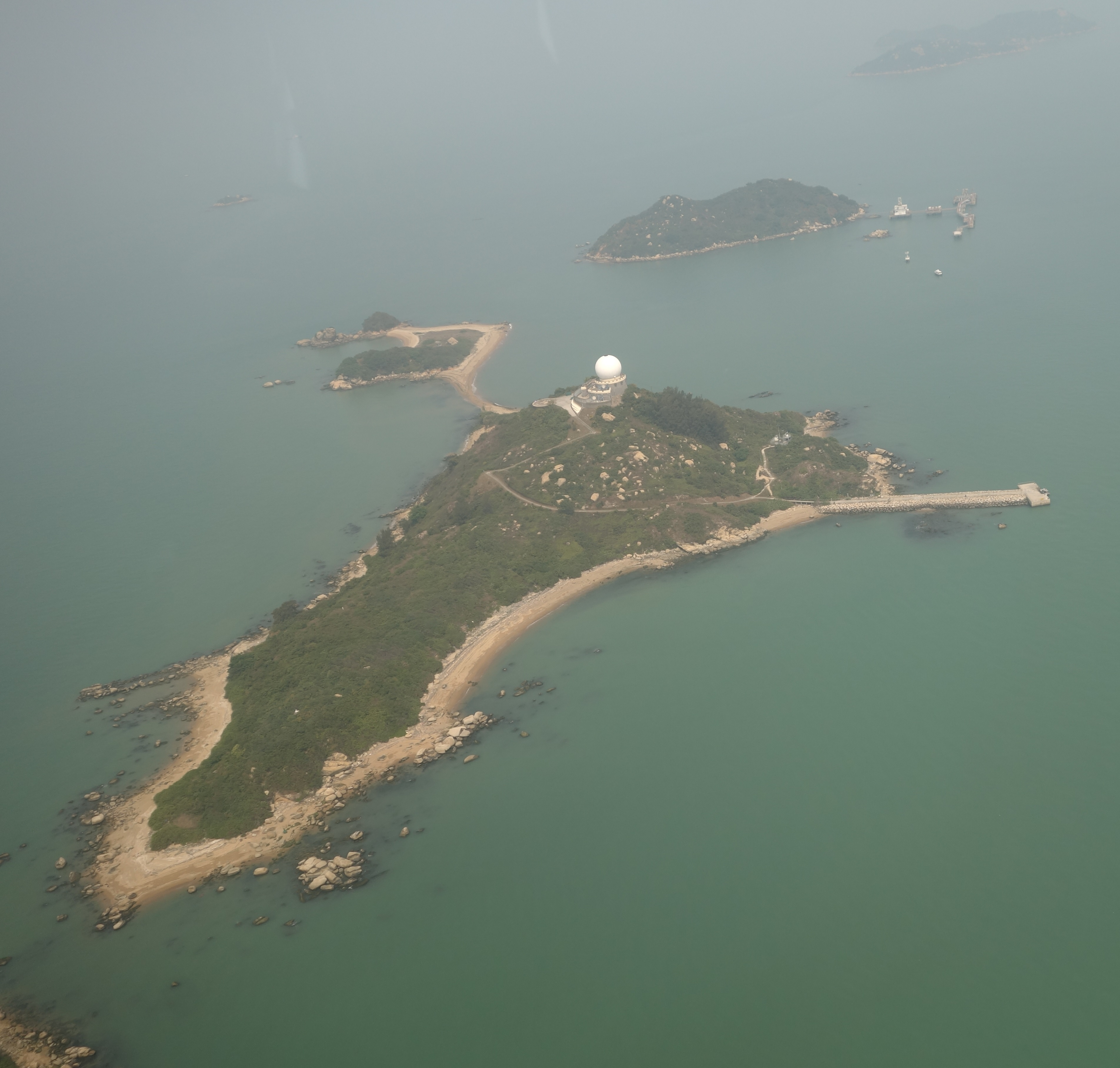
Aerial view of Sha Chau from Southwest.

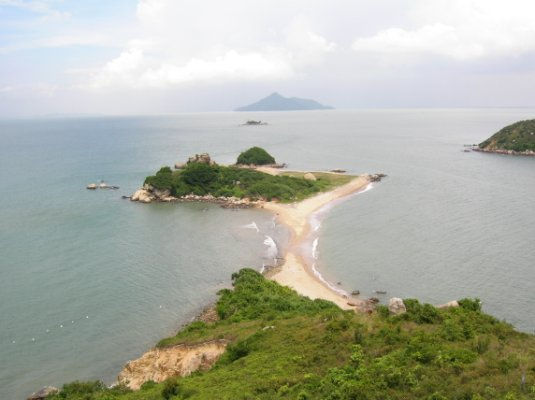
Sandbar connecting Siu Sha Chau (upper) to Tai Sha Chau. The islet on the right is Sheung Sha Chau. The island in the distance is Nei Lingding Island of Zhuhai.

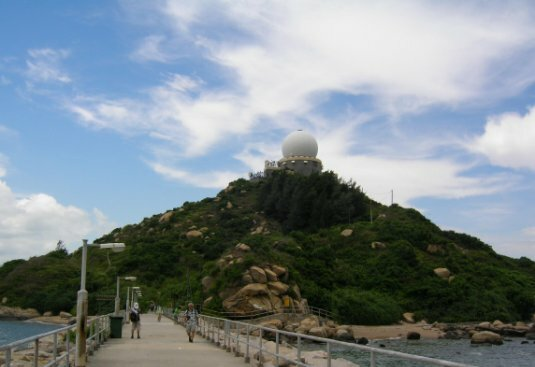
Tai Sha Chau

Sha Chau (Chinese: 沙洲; lit. 'Sand Island', formerly transliterated as Saw-Chow) is an island in the northwest waters of Hong Kong. It is off the shore of Lung Kwu Tan near Tuen Mun in the mainland New Territories, separated by the Urmston Road waterway.

== Geography ==
Sha Chau is composed of four islets including Sheung Sha Chau (上沙洲; 'Upper Sand Island'), Tai Sha Chau (大沙洲; 'Big Sand Island'), Ha Sha Chau (下沙洲; 'Lower Sand Island') and Siu Sha Chau (小沙洲; 'Small Sand Island').

== History ==
Sha Chau was a shelter for British merchant ships carrying opium during the Qing era.

== Features ==
A Tin Hau Temple is located on Siu Sha Chau. According to inscriptions, the temple was initially built in 1846 by fishermen from Castle Peak Bay off Sha Chau. The temple was destroyed by a fire in the 1970s and was rebuilt in 1998. It was a Grade II Historic Building from 1981 to 2010, when its listing was revised to "no grade".

An aviation fuel receipt facility (the Receipt Jetty) is located at Sheung Sha Chau. The Receipt Jetty is where bulk intake of fuel for Hong Kong airport takes place. The Receipt Jetty is connected to twin 6 kilometres (3.7 mi) submarine pipelines which carry the fuel to Chek Lap Kok. Sha Chau was initially intended to be a temporary location for the facility.

Tai Sha Chau is the site of an approach surveillance radar (ASR) and of a Secondary Surveillance Radar (SSR) for air traffic control.

== Conservation ==
Since 1996, the island, together with Lung Kwu Chau and Pak Chau fall within the boundaries of the Sha Chau and Lung Kwu Chau Marine Park. The three island have been listed as a Site of Special Scientific Interest since 1979. It is known as a dolphin sanctuary where is the habitat for the Chinese white dolphin.

== See also ==
- List of islands and peninsulas of Hong Kong
- Outlying Islands
