= Fengshui woodland =

Concept in traditional Chinese philosophy

A Fengshui woodland, Fungshui woodland, or Fengshui forest, known in Chinese as 風水林 (fēngshuǐlín - "Wind-water Forest") is a grove, forest, or woodland protected by the residents of villages, towns, or, in some cases, religious communities associated with Daoist or Buddhist monasteries or temples. Also known as Chinese geomantic woodlands, they are most often found near lineage villages. The trees and other plants in the woodland can either be natural or planted. Many of the trees in fengshui woodlands are the results of natural succession, and they comprise some of the most mature forest stands in China, often resembling old growth forests. Fengshui forests also contain trees planted by village ancestors, because people consider the fengshuilin an essential part of a geographical environment largely shaped by humans. These strategically protected and cultivated forests were part of the landscape design repertoire of wet rice farmers as they adapted to the humid subtropical ecosystems of southern China. Fengshui and fengshui groves were also utilized to meet the specific conditions affecting houses, tombs, temples, and entire villages. Fengshui woodlands are widely located in East Asia, while a few can be found in Chinese settlements outside of Asia.

In addition, fengshui woodland are related to many Chinese culture concepts, including funerals, the city gods, redecorating the temple, the eight diagrams. Only important individual objects are described.

== History ==
The first record of the concept of fengshui woodland can be dated to the Three Kingdoms period, proposed by Cao Pi (c. 187–226), who is the son of Cao Cao (c. 155 – 15 March 220), and recorded in the Records of the Three Kingdoms. In ancient times, a reference to this record is made for the benefits of subsequent funeral services. Usually after a king dies, the same kind of trees (pines and cypresses) would be planted next to his grave and other unnecessary trees removed—this was the earliest style of recorded fengshui woodland. With the evolution of dynasties and cultures, the types of fengshui woodland also became diversified from single ones for funerals funeral to multiple purposes. The use were no longer limited to royal family but was also spread to the common people, even foreigners. Fengshui woodland had been found in Korea during the Goryeo (918–1392) dynasties.

Fengshui woodlands have been proved has 57 in different villages in China since the 1990s. Faced with industrial pollution, urbanization and other problems, some of the existing fengshui woodlands are under great threat.

== Etymology ==
The term Fungshui woodland and Fengshui woodland can all be traced back to Chinese language system, the former comes from Cantonese, the latter is in Mandarin. The two languages share close correlation, which means their pronunciations are similar. What's more, the concept of fengshui woodland is also used in Korea and Japan. Given different language system, this word has correspondingly different rules of pronunciation and writing (Pibo in Korea, Ho:go in Japan).

== Geographical distribution ==
=== Mainland China ===
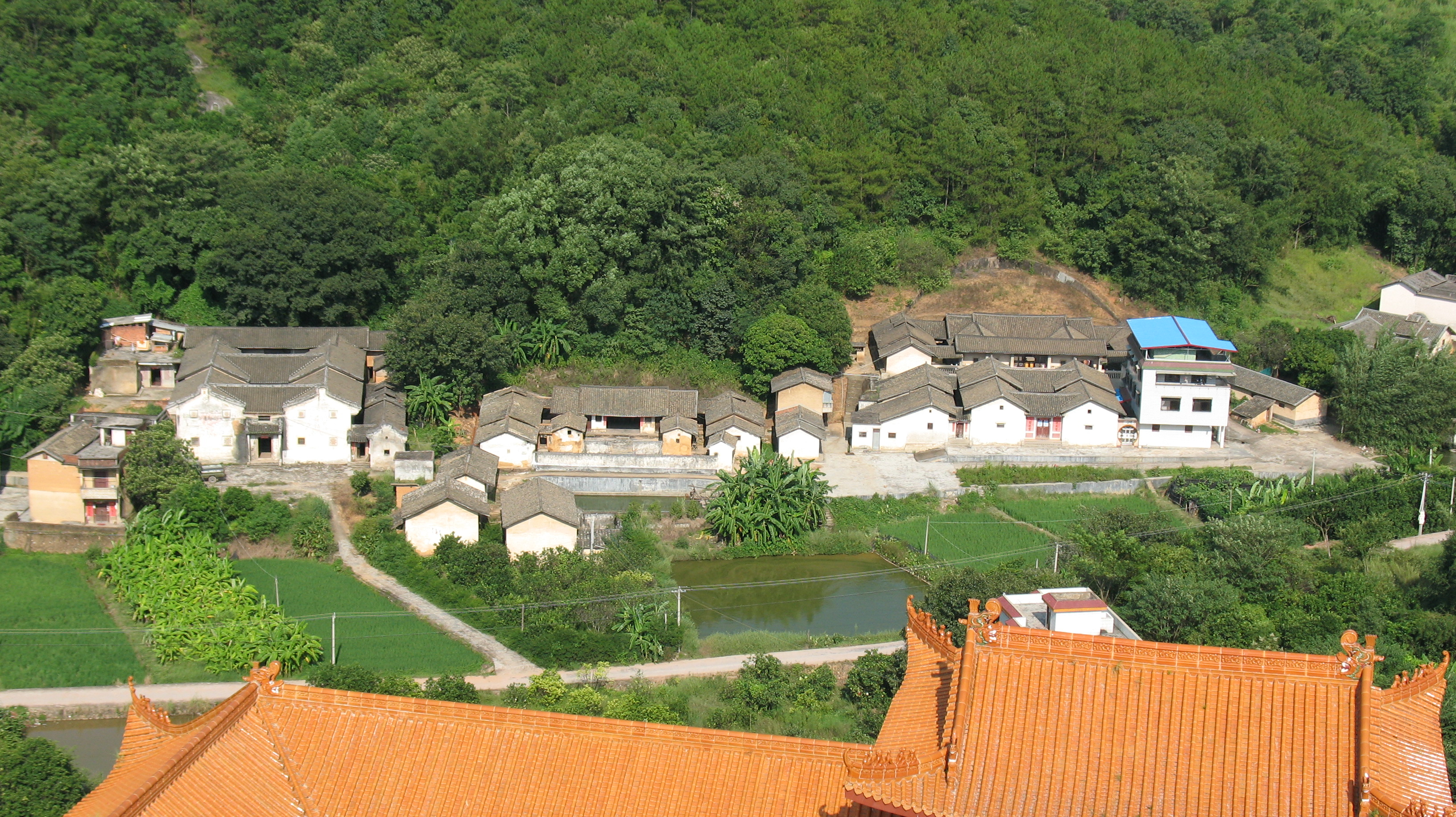
Fungshui woodland in Meizhou

Fengshui woodlands in the mainland are mainly located in the southern provinces, including Jiangxi, Hunan, Fujian, Guangdong, Guangxi, Yunnan and Anhui provinces. There are six in Jiangxi, one in Anhui, eight in Fujian, fifteen in Guangdong, four in Hunan and two in Yunnan. Shandong is the only province in the north of China that has one fengshui woodland. The examples above are typical ones, with such a broad territory, some fengshui woodlands are too small to be included. Unfortunately, due to the high degree of destruction and degradation in Fujian and Guangdong provinces, the two paradigms of fengshui woodlands are lower than other woodlands.

=== Hong Kong ===
Large fengshui woodlands are found mainly in the New Territories, the northeastern border of which is a remote place. Thanks to the environment there, the large fengshui woodlands have avoided destruction and thus remained intact. Typical fengshui woodland also exist in Sha Tin, Tai Po and the junction of Lantau and the northwestern New Territories. However, the fengshui woodlands there have smaller size under the influence of human activities. Going south, there is one fengshui woodland on Hong Kong Island at Nam Fung Road, along the south face of Mount Nicholson.

=== Korea ===
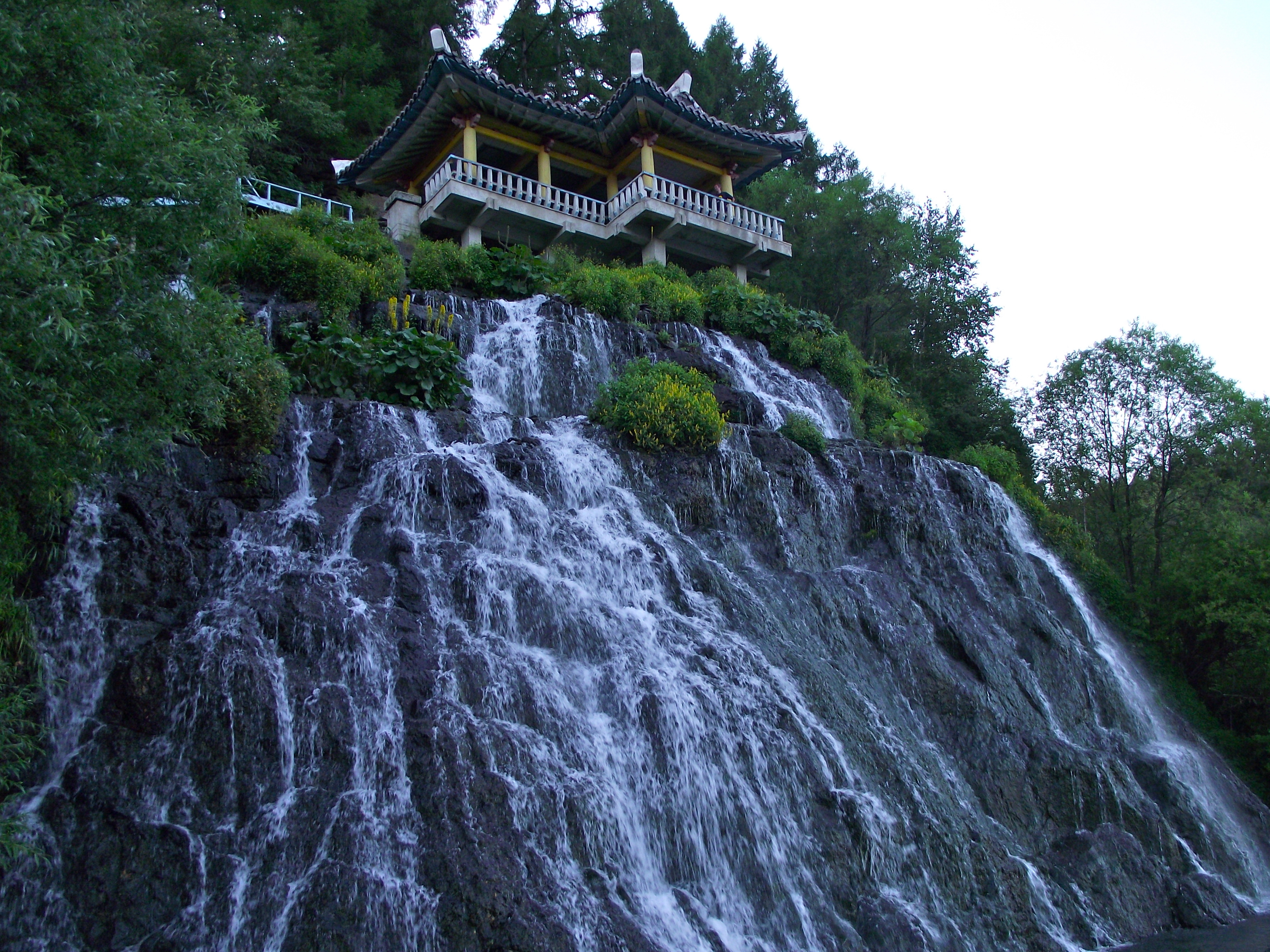
Korean woodland

According to the Korean historical documents, there was one fengshui woodland during the Joseon Dynasty (1392–1910). Based on the existing studies, some pines and small stone piles still can be found in the current location. One Korean official record indicates there were two artificial hills that were built within the city walls of Seoul. However, most of them disappeared in the wave of urbanization.

=== Ryukyu ===
Ho:go, the pronunciation of Fengshui in Ryukyu, also means Qi and fengshui woodland. Approximately, 180 such woodlands are confirmed. There are many fengshui woodlands in Ryukyu because people always arrange Fengshui woodland in their traditional village. Therefore, fengshui woodland exist on almost every island in Ryukyu, including Okinawa, Miyako, Minna, Ishigaki and Tarama .

== Purpose ==
The main purpose of Fengshui woodland is to change the fengshui of the area. Fengshui woodland is regarded as a single plant area with special purpose aiming to change the fengshui of the whole area to some extent. To put it simple, appropriate fengshui can brings luck to the surrounding, including people. Vice versa, inappropriate fengshui can have negative effects. From an in-depth perspective, Chinese geomantic culture does not emphasize the concept that god bless you, but it values the use of human factors, namely to change the environment to achieve physical health, career success, even family reproduction.

The concept of the fengshui woodland does not only exist in China, but also in Korea and Ryukyu. The cultures of both countries elaborate on the word “Qi” holding that Qi is flowing energy. Fengshui woodland can add up to the energy of people. Furthermore, Qi is a concept in Fengshui study, in which Qi is divided into two types, one is Negative Wind, the other is the air we breathe in (xie qi). In English, xie qi means the undesirable wind, including six subtypes, wind, coolness, dryness, dampness, fieriness and hotness. These negative winds may make us vulnerable to diseases. The other kind of qi is the opposite of negative qi. It can shield us from negative qi brought by six negative winds. To avoid these winds, people built fengshui woodland to increase the qi we breathe in so that neutralizing the negative qi.

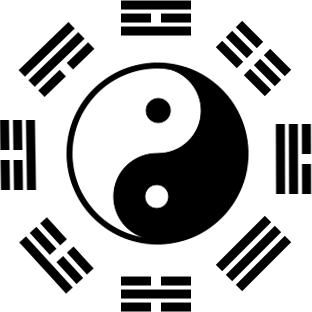
Ba gua

Fengshui woodland also has another description—the eight diagrams. In Chinese eight diagrams, every diagram has unique meaning. 乾Qian, 兌 Duì,離 Lí, 震 Zhèn, 巽 Xùn, 坎 Kǎn, 艮 Gèn, 坤 Kūn. In English, the eight diagrams separately has the nature Heaven/Firmament, Lake/Marsh, Heart of Fire, Thunder, Wind, Water, Mountain and Ground. Chinese believe that the eight diagrams are three-dimensional, with a certain position at the center of eight of them, the positions of them are fixed. Fengshui woodland exerts effects on wind, water, mountain and ground. Therefore, people built fengshui woodland to gain a better eight diagrams.

However, no scientific study can prove the existence of fengshui and whether fengshui can indeed change the prosperity and development of the region.

== Function ==
Because of its significant cultural and ecological value, local people in Hong Kong believe that fengshui woodland offers a great sense of security. Also, fengshui woodland is also beneficial to the microclimate. For examples, in winter, fengshui woodland can keep the dry chilly north wind at bay. It also protects village from mountain torrents and sliding mud in the event of landslide. In summer, the destructive effects of typhoons can be greatly mitigated by fengshui woodland, providing cool shade and reduce local temperatures for villagers. From economical perspective, fruit trees in fengshui woodland create extra income to villagers.

== Typology ==
Fengshui woodland is divided into three types according to the location, namely funeral fengshui woodland, village fengshui woodland, and temple fengshui woodland.

=== Funeral fengshui woodland ===
On the one hand as the earliest type of fengshui woodland, its content and form did not gone through radical changes. People plant is mainly planted with willow or pine trees as fengshui woodland next to the cemetery. On the other hand, this kind of fengshui woodland also can be applied to such a wide range of the areas from Guangdong Province in China to Korea. However, compared with the other two, it is one of the least used. According to research data, its ratio is 1.2 percent out of all fengshui woodlands.

=== Village fengshui woodland ===
The number of subtypes of Fengshui woodland in the village is more than the other two in which 6 subtypes are included. The first is Back mountain fengshui woodland, the type of fengshui woodland that is often found near ancestral temples (note: ancestral temple is different from ordinary temple in that ordinary temple is where gods are enshrined while ancestral temple is built in name of ancestors). The second is Shan’ao fengshui woodland, also called the Mountain gap fengshui woodland, which is commonly located in depression on the side of a ridge. The third, Water gate fengshui woodland, has two subtypes, including Water head/village head, Water/village mouth. Head and mouth only differ in geographical position. Head usually refers to the entrance of a village. Correspondingly, mouth refers to exit of a village. The two subtypes of fengshui woodland can be concluded as the type of Water gate because water gate in Jiangxi province is called shui kou. The meaning of Shui kou in Chinese is equivalent to that of water gate in English. It can refer to water/river in entrance or exit simultaneously. The fourth is Paintbrush holder (Bi jia) fengshui woodland. The name of this type is narrow woodland on the edge of a village. The fifth is homestead fengshui woodland, which has two sub types. One is named wind break fengshui woodland, the other is named footstone fengshui woodland. These two kinds of fengshui woodland are basically built around houses.

=== Temple fengshui woodland ===
This type of fengshui woodland includes three subtypes. First is Buddhist and Daoist temple fengshui woodland. Second is Earth god shrine fengshui woodland. Because there is no definition of Earth god in Wikipedia currently, westerners may be confused of it. But unlike the situation in the west, Earth god in China is a god of an area, not the entire Earth. Therefore, there are many Earth gods who are responsible for the peace of their own area in Chinese mythology. The last Bridge temple fengshui woodland. Its name and structure could be different because of the attribute of the temple.

== Botany ==
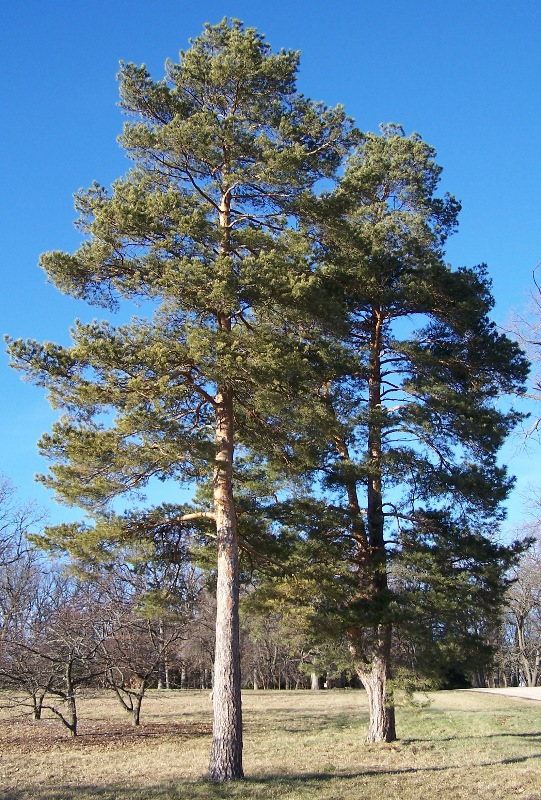
Pine in Fengshui woodland

Vegetation structure and species diversity are the main target of many botanic studies of fengshui woodland. One scholar team compared 138 field samples with samples from large nature reserves after collection. The ecological information about the whole fengshui woodland which covers the ranges community structure, species richness, and average plot abundance can be obtained from the sample analysis. The sample analysis provides a statistical understanding of fengshui woodland. It indicated that fengshui woodland has much higher species diversity then the other types of woodlands and plantations. There are approximately 700 species in 30 samples of fengshui woodland in the Pearl River Delta. From vegetation structure perspective, fengshui woodland is climax vegetation structure of native woodland. The type of structure can effectively provide data of local species.

As for species in fengshui woodland, many plant species of fengshui woodland in the Pearl River Delta are not in all the cases, fengshui woodland with few plant species also exists. In Korean records, the Goryeo dynasty, fengshui woodland within Seoul city wall is mainly pines. One of other contemporaneous fengshui woodlands was formed by willows. The situation is also different from study in Ryukyu, in which among the five surveyed plots in Tarama woodland of Ryukyu fengshui woodland, there are 5 species on average. Calophyllum inophyllum constitutes the largest proportion.

In a floral survey, Hong Kong Fisheries and Conservation Department found 116 local plants in fengshui woodland, among which most of them belong to families of Lauraceae, Moraceae and Euphorbiaceae. In Hong Kong fengshui woodland, Sterculia lanceolate, Aporosa dioica, Aquilaria sinensis and Ardisia quinquegona are the most typical plants. Besides, fruit trees like Longan, Lychee, Wampi, Banana, Pummelo, Mandarin, Rose Apple, Guava and Papaya also grow in the woodland.
