= Por Kai Shan =

Mountain in Hong Kong

- 婆髻山
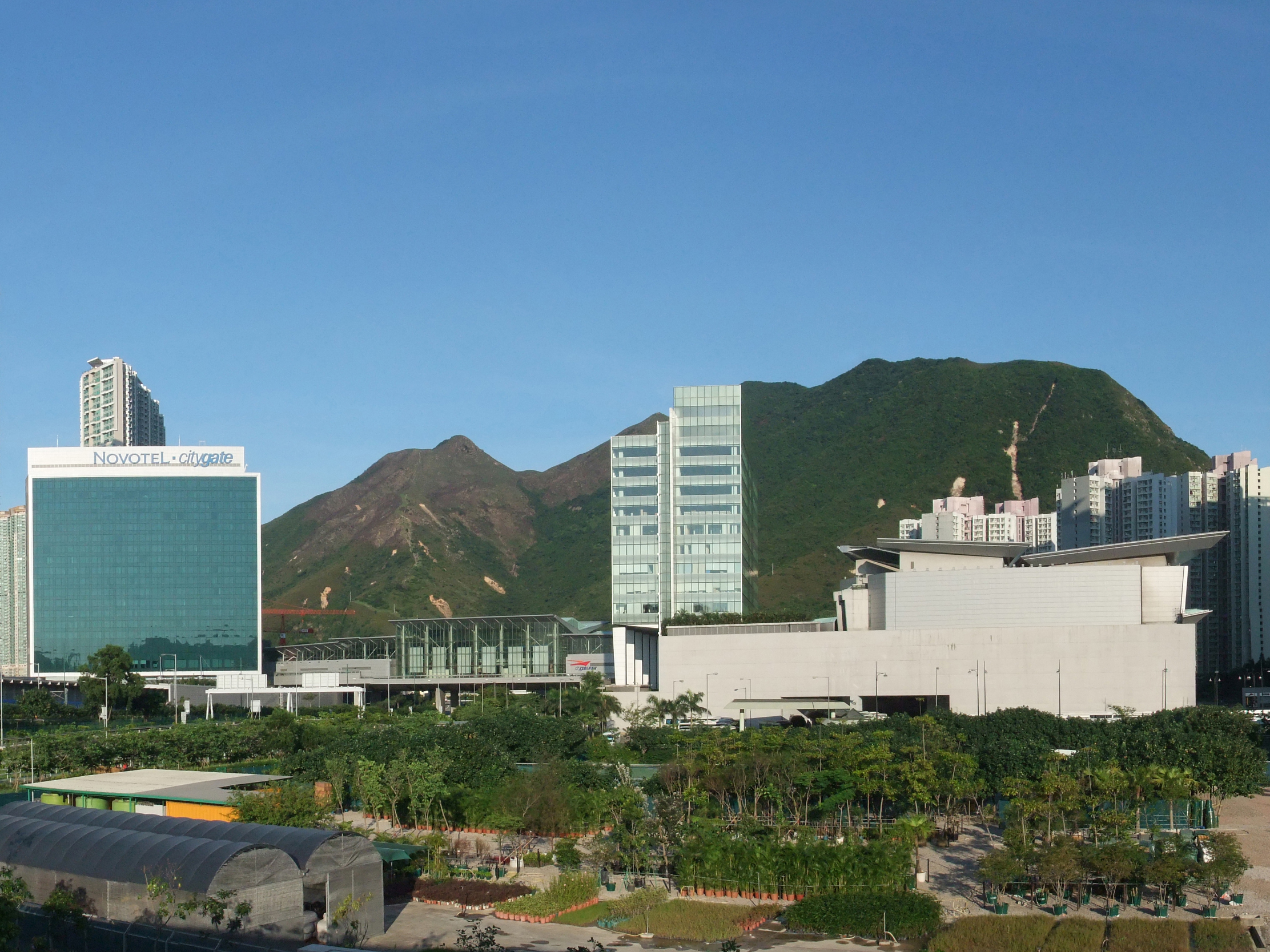
- On the left is Por Kai Shan

Highest point
- Elevation: 482 m (1,581 ft)
- Coordinates: 22.2866°N 113.9602°E

Geography
- Location within Hong Kong
- Location: Lantau Island, Hong Kong

Por Kai Shan (Chinese: 婆髻山) is a mountain on Lantau Island, Hong Kong, with a height of 482 metres (1,581 ft) above sea level.

== Flora ==
Por Kai Shan and neighbouring Pok To Yan were designated together a "Site of Special Scientific Interest" in 1994. According to the local government, this site has "over 200 species of native plants." and "a number of rare and protected indigenous plants".

== Geography ==
To the northwest is Tung Chung, while to the south is Sunset Peak.

== See also ==
- List of mountains, peaks and hills in Hong Kong
