= Lung Kwu Chau =

Island of Hong Kong

Native name: 龍鼓洲
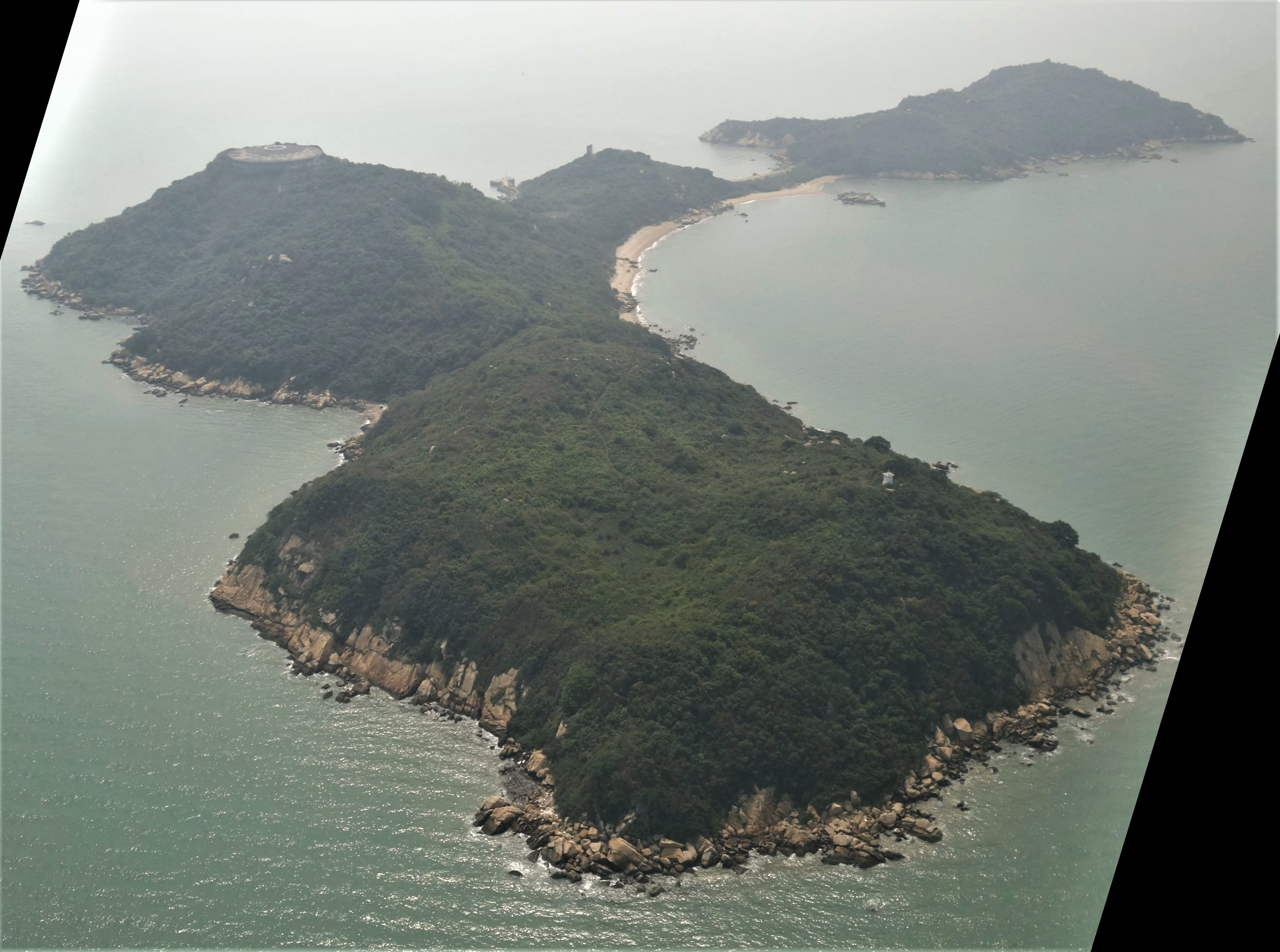
- Aerial view of Lung Kwu Chau

- Location within Hong Kong

Geography
- Coordinates: 22.375997°N 113.883317°E

Administration
- Hong Kong

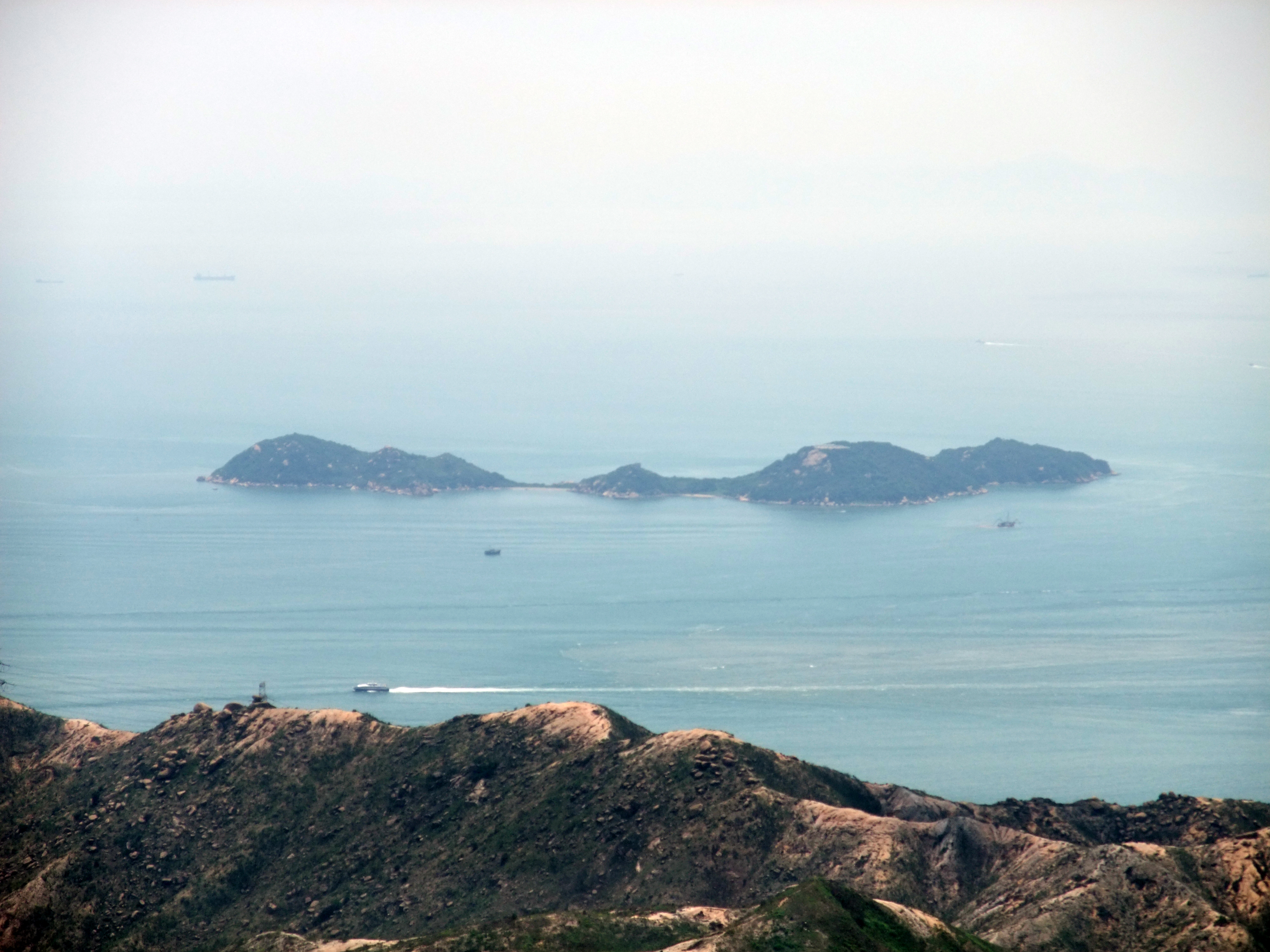
Lung Kwu Chau viewed from Castle Peak.

Lung Kwu Chau (Chinese: 龍鼓洲; lit. 'Dragon Drum Island'; also previously transliterated as Tung Koo, Tung Koo, Toon Oo or Toon-quoo) is an island at the northwest water of Hong Kong. It is off the shore of Lung Kwu Tan near Tuen Mun in the mainland New Territories, separated by the Urmston Road waterway.

The island is formed of Hong Kong granite and is unoccupied.

== History ==
The earliest cultural remains of the Lung Kwu Chau Archaeological Site can be dated to the middle phase of the Neolithic period (c. 4000-2000 BC), representing the beginning of cultural history in the Hong Kong area.

Lung Kwu Chau is clearly marked in O Livro de Francisco Rodrigues, written in 1514.

== Conservation ==
Since 1996, the island, together with Sha Chau and Pak Chau are within the boundaries of the Sha Chau and Lung Kwu Chau Marine Park. The three island have been listed as a Site of Special Scientific Interest since 1979. It is known as a dolphin sanctuary due to being the habitat for the Chinese white dolphin.

== See also ==
- Islands of Hong Kong
- Outlying Islands
