= Sham Wat =

Coordinates: 22.269647°N 113.887896°E

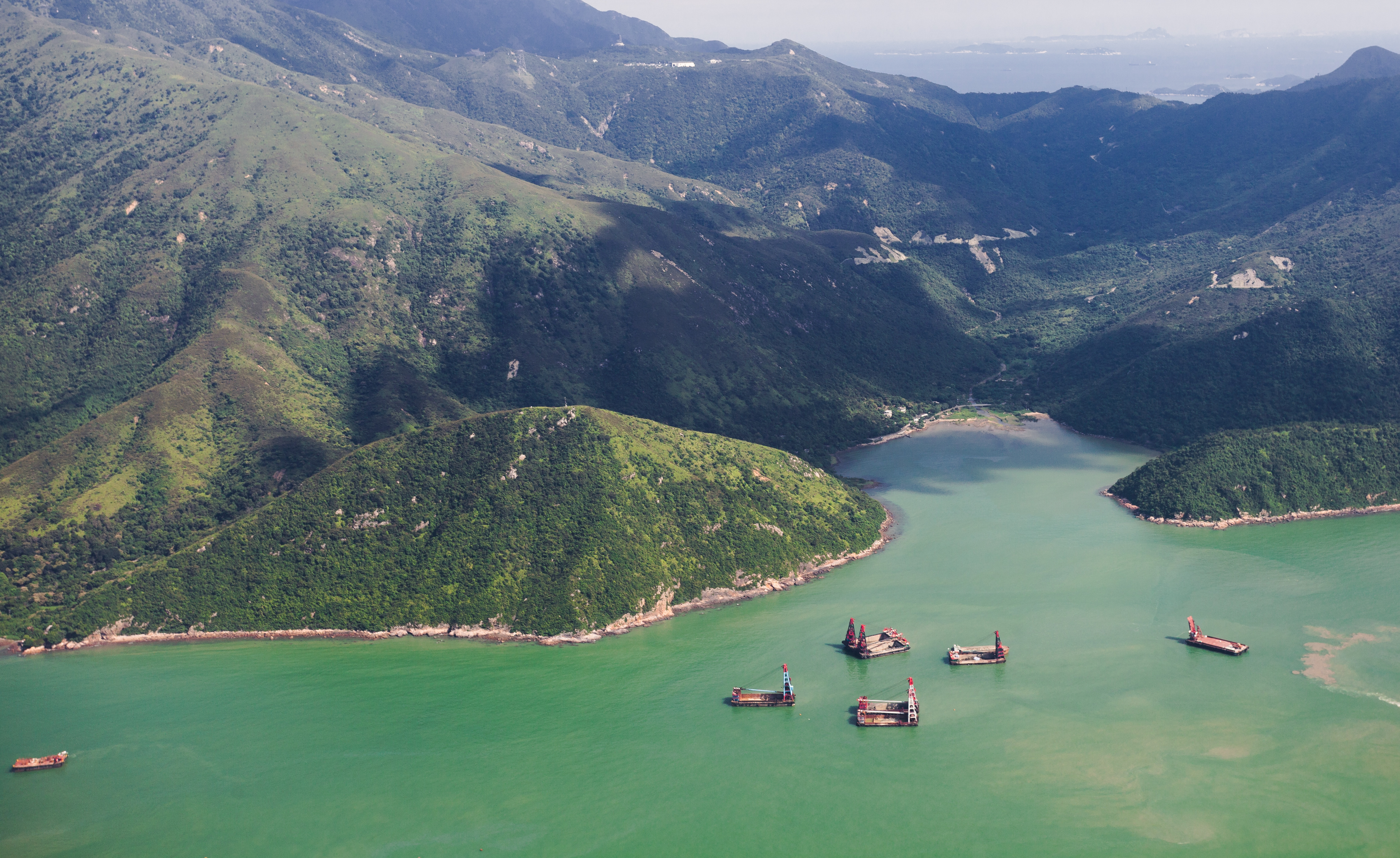
Aerial view of Sham Wat Wan (深屈灣; 'Sham Wat Bay') in 2013

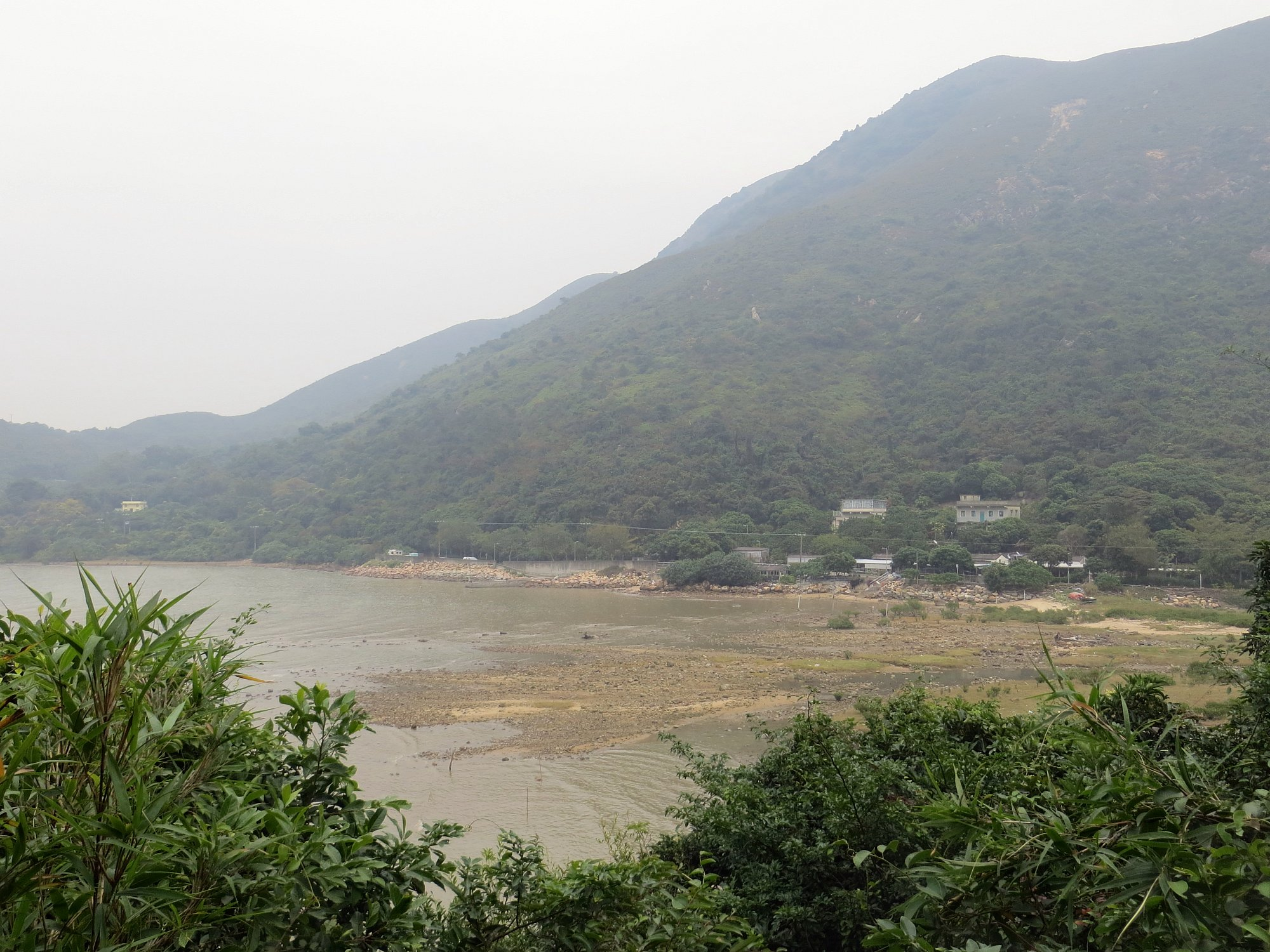
Distant view of Sham Wat

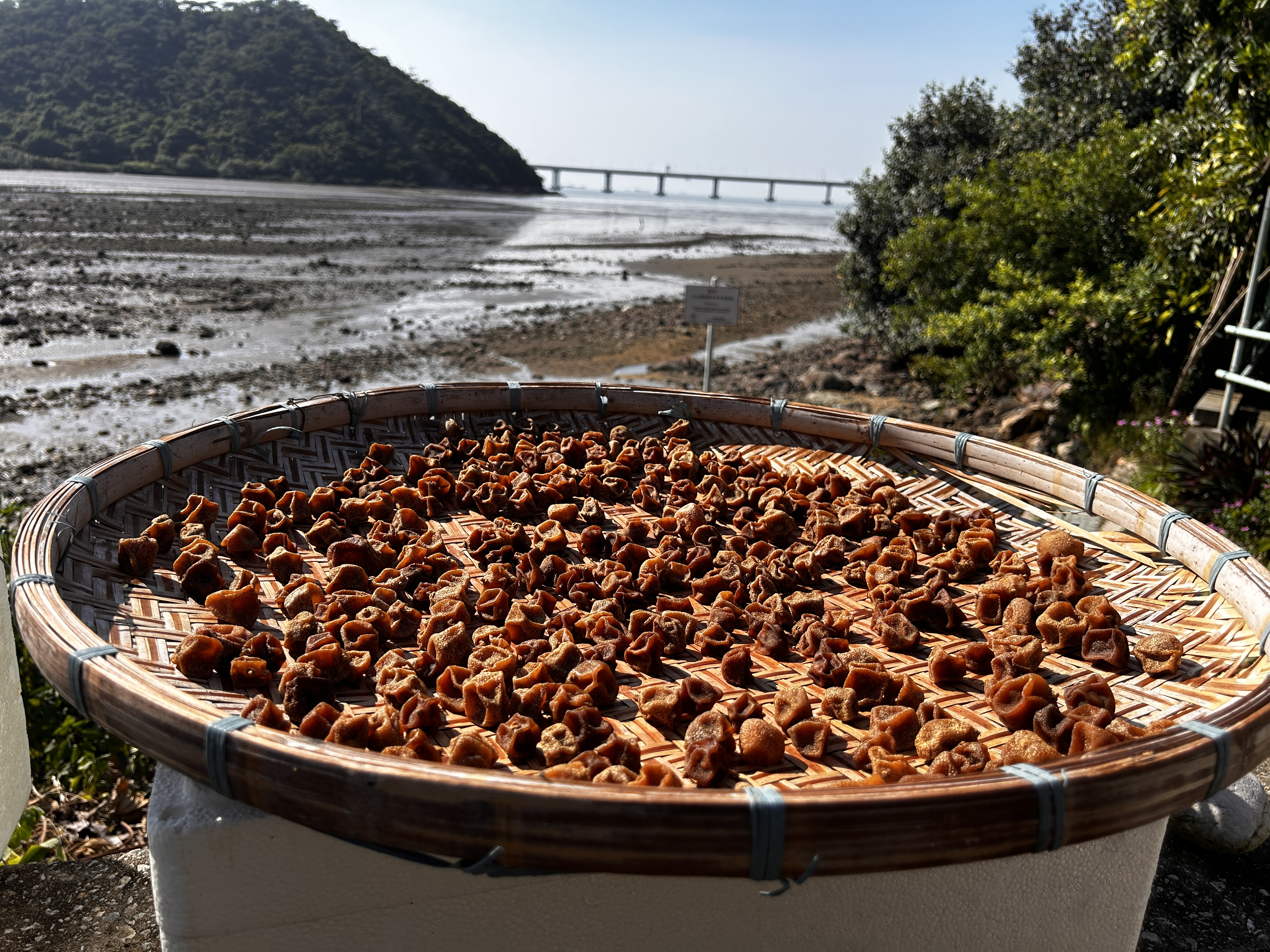
Drying seafood by the Sham Wat mudflats

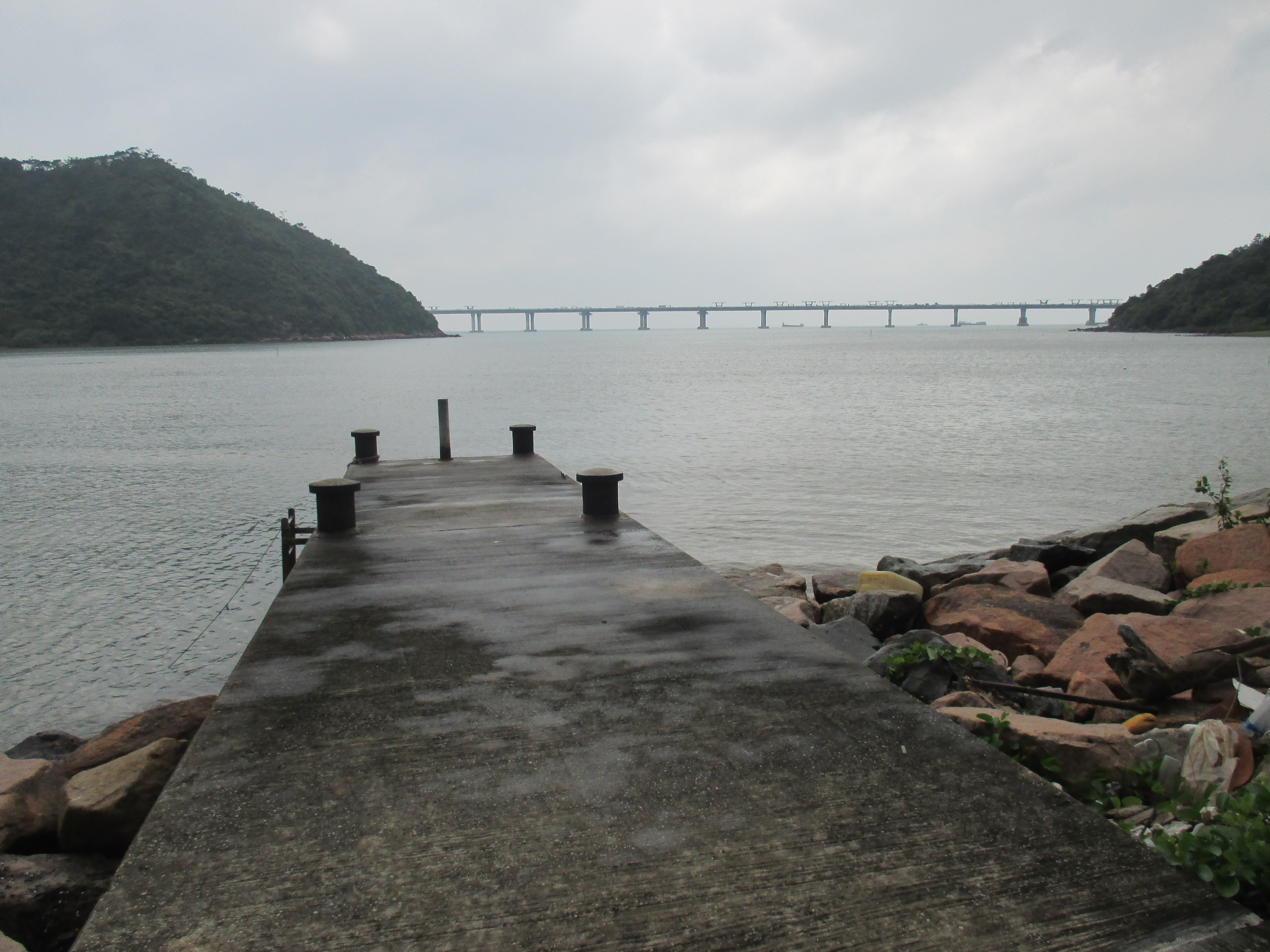
View of the Hong Kong–Zhuhai–Macau Bridge from Sham Wat Pier.

Sham Wat (Chinese: 深屈) is a village of Lantau Island, in Hong Kong.

== Administration ==
Sham Wat is a recognized village under the New Territories Small House Policy.

== Flora and fauna ==
Encompassing the river valley between Nei Lak Shan and Cheung Shan, Sham Wat is a remaining biodiversity hotspot in North Lantau and an abundance of animals and plants reside in the valley. The mudflats contain oyster beds naturally seeded from the Pearl River Delta.

== Access ==
Sham Wat is accessible by road via Sha Wat Road (深屈道), and by sea.

It is located along the Tung O Ancient Trail, a coastal hiking trail between Tung Chung and Tai O. The village has a few restaurants that serves passing hikers with local food.
