= Mo Tat =

Village on Lamma Island, Hong Kong

Coordinates: 22°12′28.4″N 114°8′43.42″E

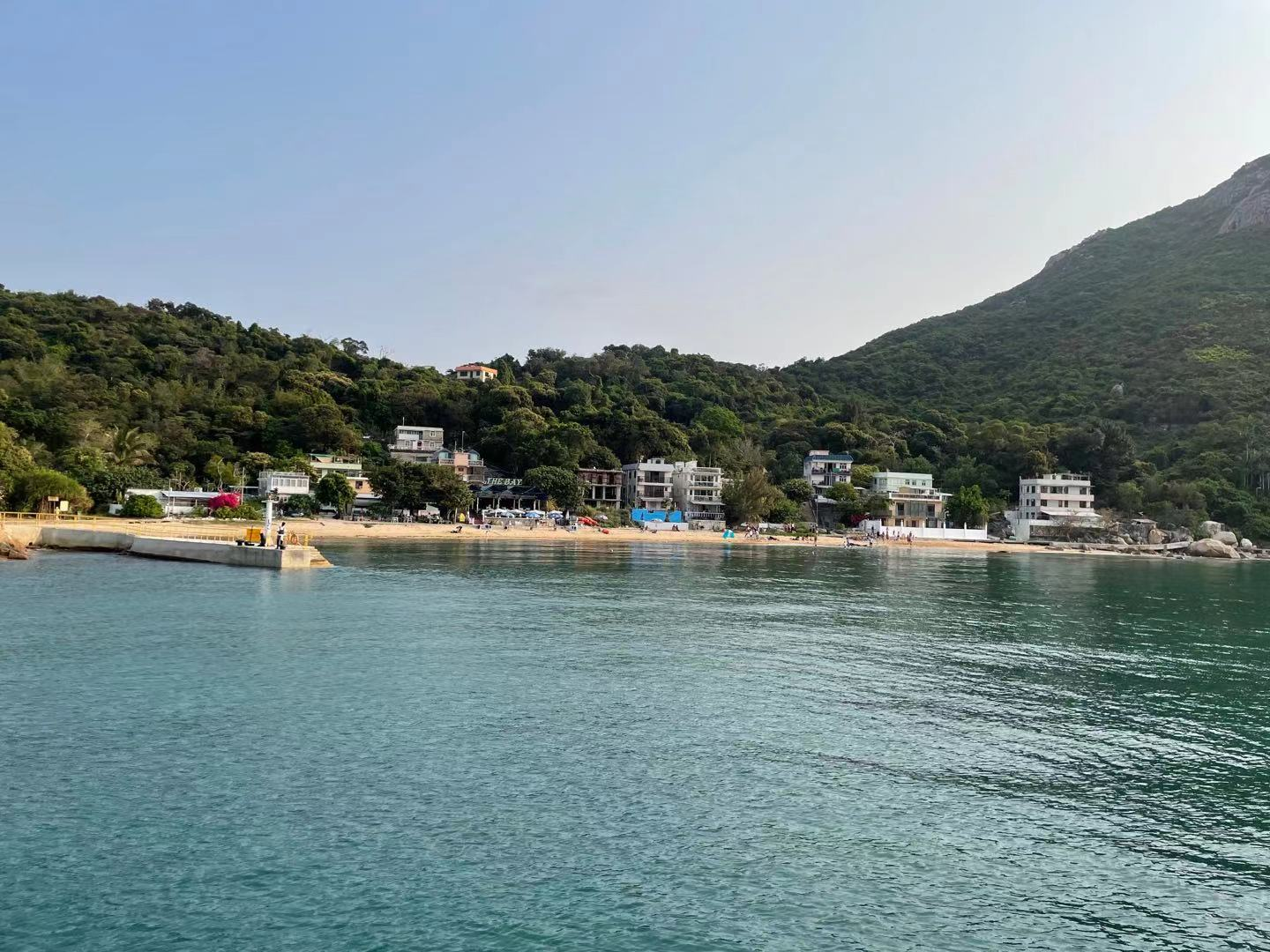
Mo Tat Wan in April 2021

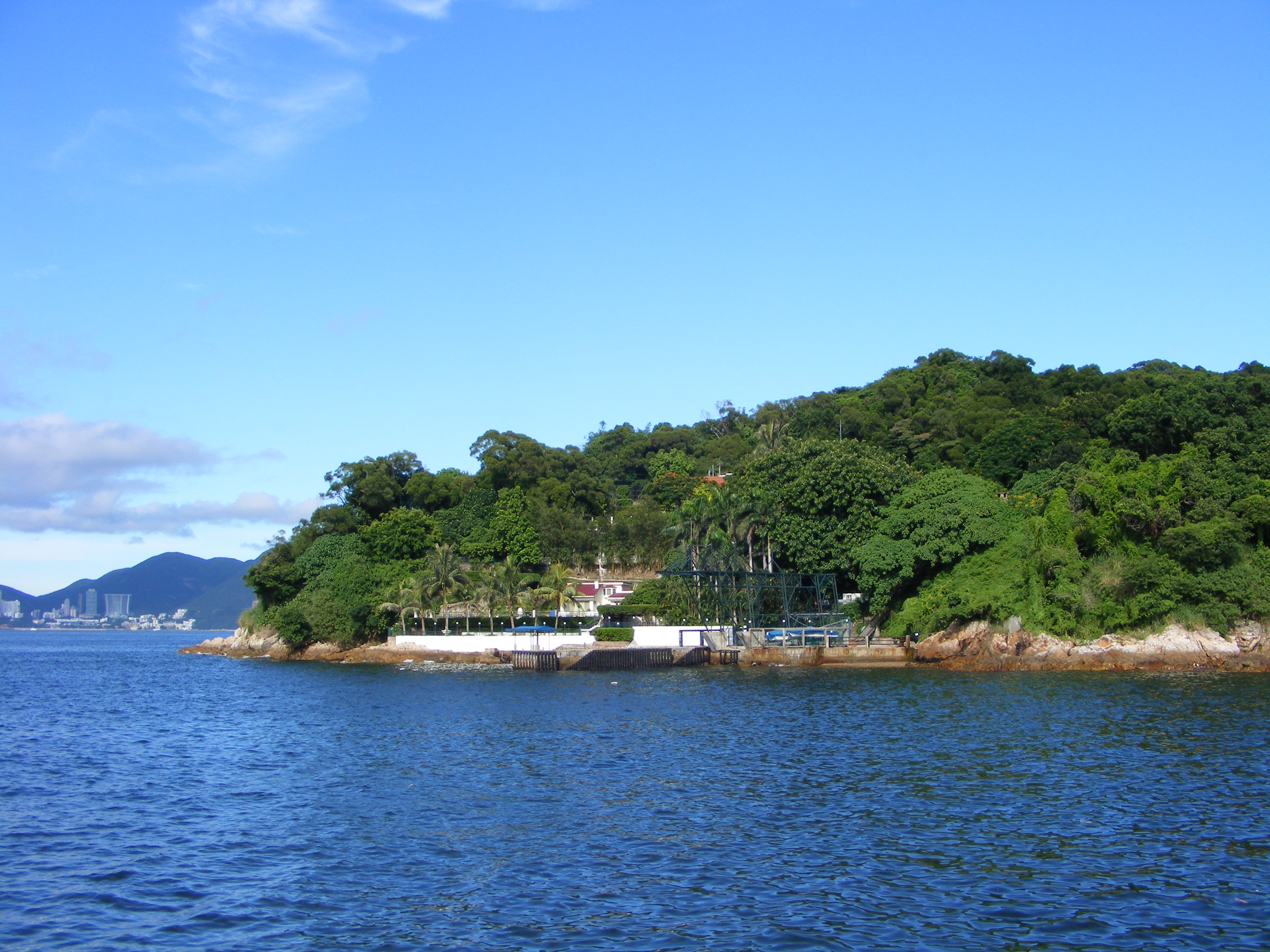
Mo Tat Wan in August 2010

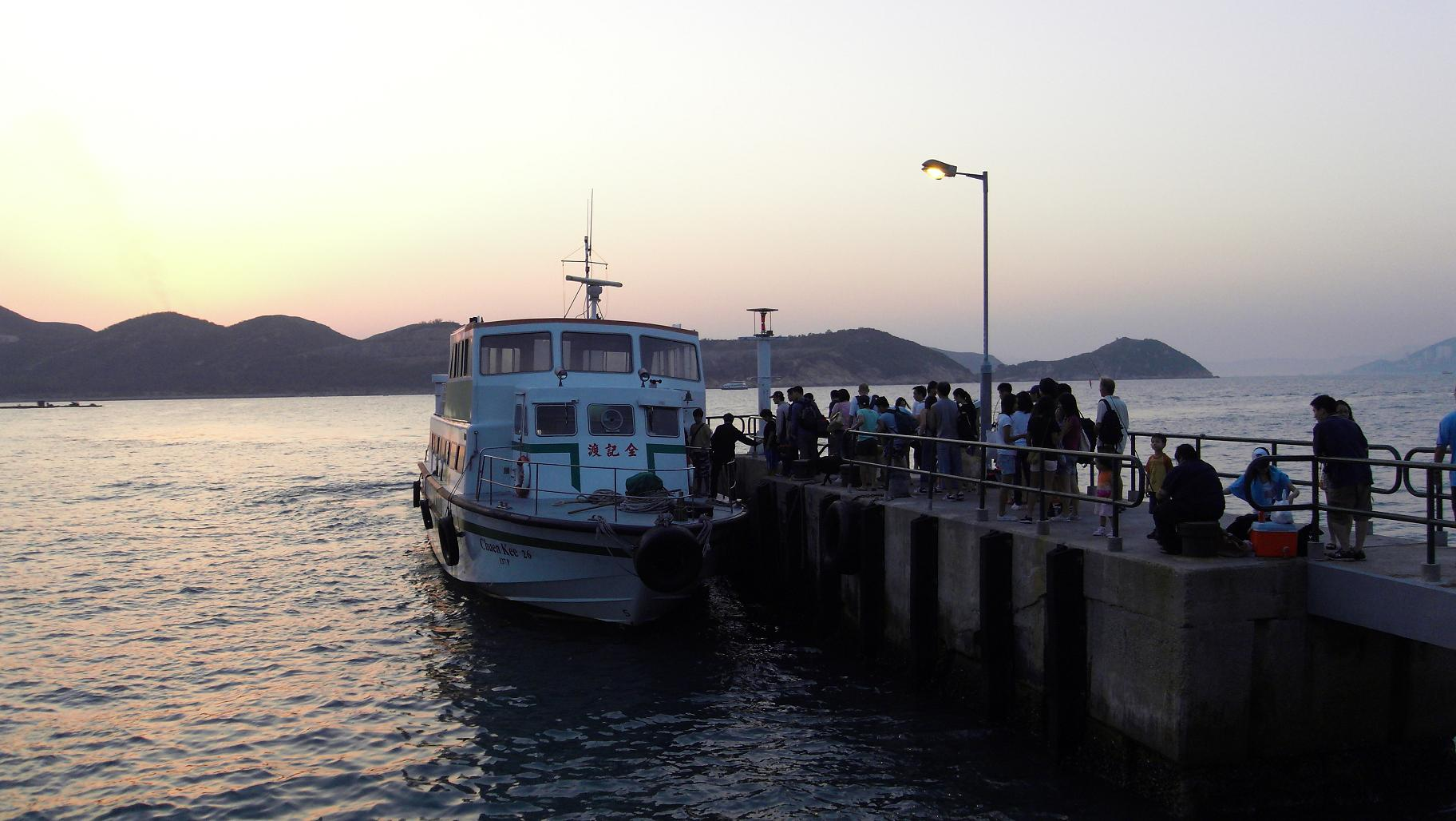
Mo Tat Wan Pier in May 2009

Mo Tat (Chinese: 模達) is a small administrative area in the southern half of Lamma Island, Hong Kong, on the spur of land that juts east and faces Aberdeen. The area is composed of three different villages: Mo Tat Wan (模達灣) along the beach, Mo Tat Sun Tsuen (模達新村; 'Mo Tat New Village') on a low hill south of Mo Tat Wan, and Mo Tat or Mo Tat Old Village (模達舊村) in the valley south of Mo Tat New Village.

The villages have no shops or commercial centre, although there is a restaurant near the ferry pier.

== Administration ==
Mo Tat and Mo Tat Wan are recognized villages under the New Territories Small House Policy.

== Rejected luxury real estate plan ==
Mainland China-based Agile Property Holdings had proposed in 2011 a private luxury development with a large 500-yacht marina, one 120-room hotel, 900 upmarket residential units across Tung O Wan to the northern part of the bay. The size of this rejected project was to be equal to 125 standard football fields.

The development site boundary would only have been 200 to 300 metres away from Sham Wan, a nesting ground for the endangered green turtle in the south of Lamma which is listed by the government as a "site of special scientific interest" with restricted entry. Alan Leung Sze-lun, senior conservation officer for WWF Hong Kong, said his group was very worried about the project's impact on the endangered species.

== Transport ==
There is a public ferry running between Aberdeen and Sok Kwu Wan via Mo Tat operated by Chuen Kee Ferry. Ferries run to Central from Sok Kwu Wan, a village also 20 minutes by foot from Mo Tat.
