= Sok Kwu Wan Public Pier =

Pier in Lamma Island, Hong Kong

Sok Kwu Wan Public Pier 索罟灣公眾碼頭
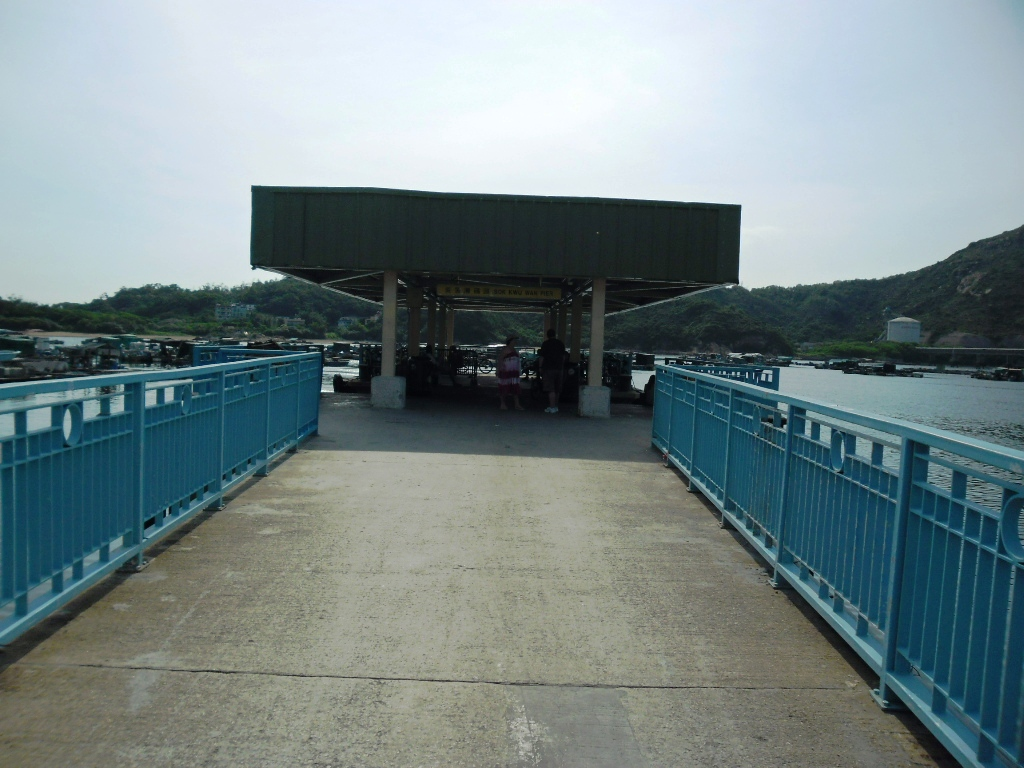
- Sok Kwu Wan Public Pier
- Location: Sok Kwu Wan First Street, Lamma Island
- Coordinates: 22.205639°N 114.130946°E
- Operator: Transport Department
- Maintained by: Civil Engineering and Development Department

Characteristics
- ID number: IP039

History
- Opening date: 17 May 1962; 64 years ago

Sok Kwu Wan Public Pier
- Traditional Chinese: 索罟灣公眾碼頭
- Simplified Chinese: 索罟湾公众码头
Transcriptions
Standard Mandarin
- Hanyu Pinyin: Suǒ Gǔ Wān Gōng Zhòng Mǎ Tóu
Yue: Cantonese
- Yale Romanization: Sok gú wāan gūng jung máh tàuh
- Jyutping: Sok3 gu2 waan1 gung1 zung3 maa5 tau4

Sok Kwu Wan Public Pier, also known as Sok Kwu Wan Pier, is a public pier located adjacent to Sok Kwu Wan Pier No. 2 on the waterfront of Sok Kwu Wan in Sok Kwu Wan First Street, Lamma Island, Hong Kong. There is only one ferry service provided in the pier, which is the service between Sok Kwu Wan and Aberdeen via Mo Tat Wan, operated by Chuen Kee Ferry.

== History ==
The government developed Lamma Island in 1958. One of the plans was to fund the construction of a pier in Sok Kwu Wan. The project started in December 1958 and was completed in August 1959; But the pier was not officially opened until 17 May 1962.
