= Tung O =

Tung O may refer to:

- Tung O Ancient Trail, a coastal trail between Tung Chung and Tai O on Lantau Island, Hong Kong
- Tung O, a village near Yung Shue Ha by Tung O Wan, Lamma Island, southern New Territories, Hong Kong
- Tung O, an area near Tung O Wan on Crooked Island (Kat O), northeastern New Territories, Hong Kong
