= Sham Wan =

Sham Wan (Chinese: 深灣; lit. 'deep bay') is the names of several places in Hong Kong:

- Sham Wan (Lamma Island)
- Sham Wan (Sai Kung District)
- Sham Wan (Southern District)
