= Mount Stenhouse =

Mountain in Hong Kong

- 山地塘/陰山
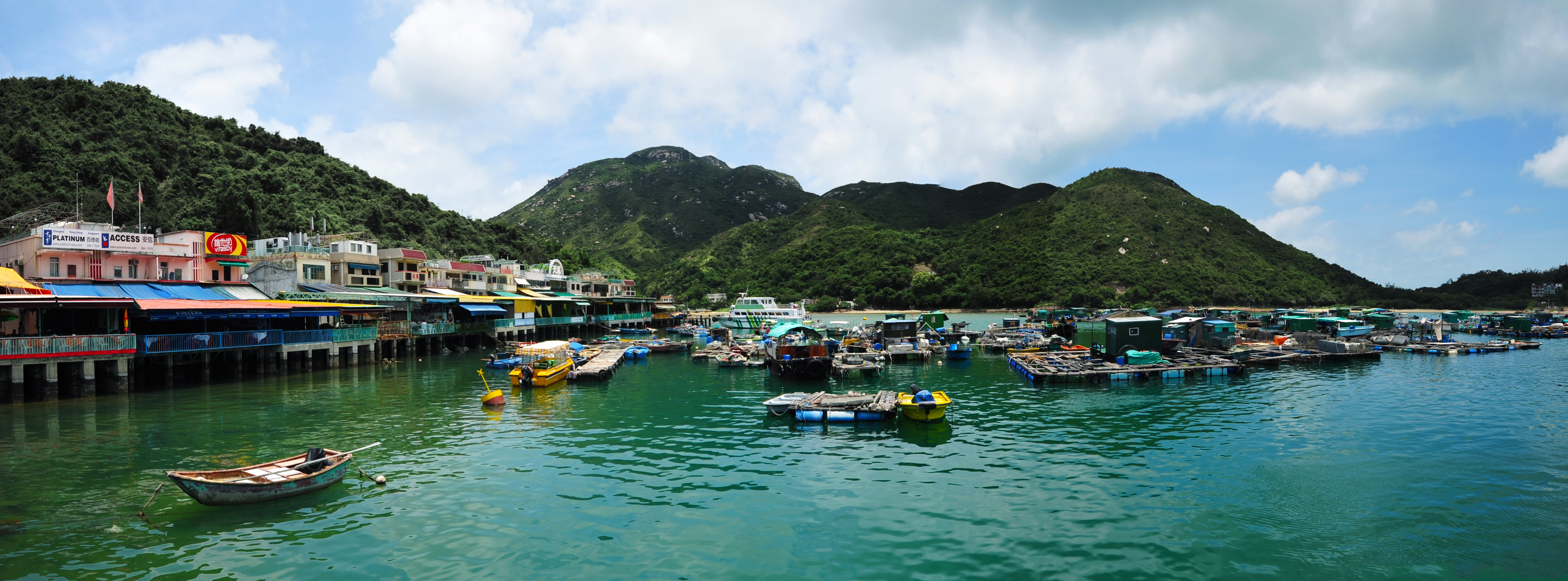
- Mount Stenhouse is the mountain in the middle. Taken in July 2011.

Highest point
- Elevation: 353 m (1,158 ft)
- Coordinates: 22°11′30″N 114°07′39″E

Geography
- Location within Hong Kong
- Location: Lamma Island, Hong Kong

Mount Stenhouse or Shan Tei Tong (Chinese: 山地塘／陰山) is the highest peak on Lamma Island in Hong Kong, with a height of 353 metres (1,158 ft) above sea level.

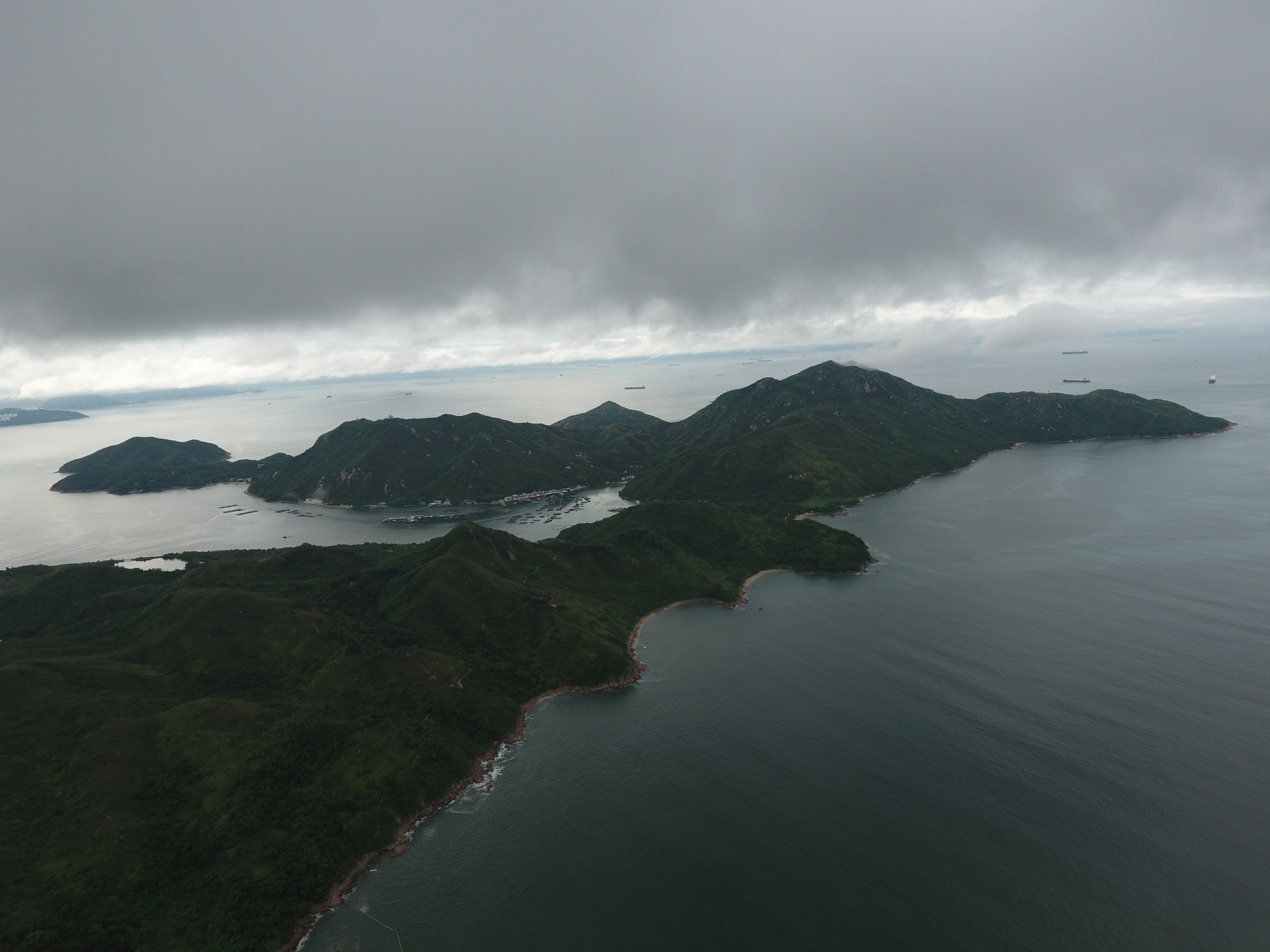
Mount Stenhouse is to the right of Sok Kwu Wan Village. Taken in August 2016.

It is probably named after Humphrey Fleming Senhouse, but acquired a misspelling over time.

== Access ==
The paths leading up to the summit are rocky and not maintained by the government. Only experienced hikers should summit this peak.

== See also ==
- List of mountains, peaks and hills in Hong Kong
- Ling Kok Shan
- Sok Kwu Wan
