= Tai Peng =

Coordinates: 22.2296°N 114.1158°E

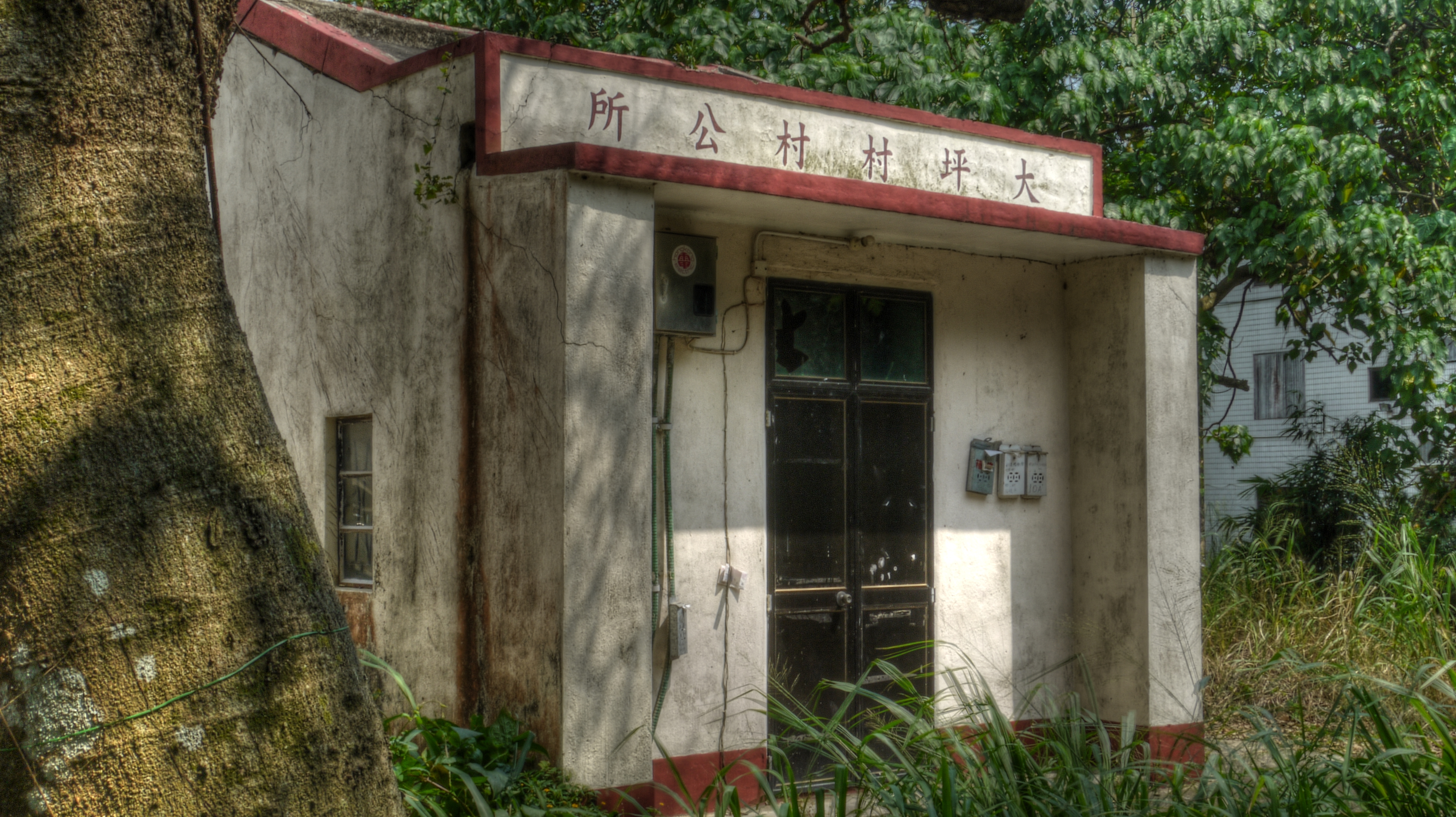
Village Hall in Tai Peng Kau Tsuen, Lamma Island, Hong Kong, October 2011

Tai Peng (Chinese: 大坪; lit. 'big plateau') is a small residential village to the northeast of Yung Shue Wan on Lamma Island, Hong Kong, on the hill directly north above the Yung Shue Long (榕樹塱) valley.

== Administration ==
Tai Peng is a recognized village under the New Territories Small House Policy.

== History ==
Tai Peng had a school before World War II. It was discontinued after the war and the children went to school in Yung Shue Wan. Tai Peng had 154 inhabitants in the late 1950s, with 17 men working at sea. Villagers were raising pigs and engaged in the cultivation of vegetables.

== Features ==
Tai Peng is roughly split into two parts. The older part, Tai Peng Kau Tsuen (大坪舊村; 'old village'), and the newer part, Tai Peng San Tsuen (大坪新村; 'new village').

Tai Peng Tsuen consists mainly of residential housing which about 100-200 people live there. A number of houses are still in use, in which most of them were elderly people, though it was halfway on a mountain, of which some are reputed to be more than 300 years old. Facilities include a village hall, a small shrine, a community garden, a public shelter and public toilets. There had been a small grocery shop called Regent Stores, which closed down in December 2015. Now, there was a new grocery shop at the same location called Tai Peng Store run by Queenie and Terrence.
