= Sok Kwu Wan Pier No. 2 =

Pier in Lamma Island, Hong Kong

Sok Kwu Wan Pier No. 2 索罟灣二號碼頭
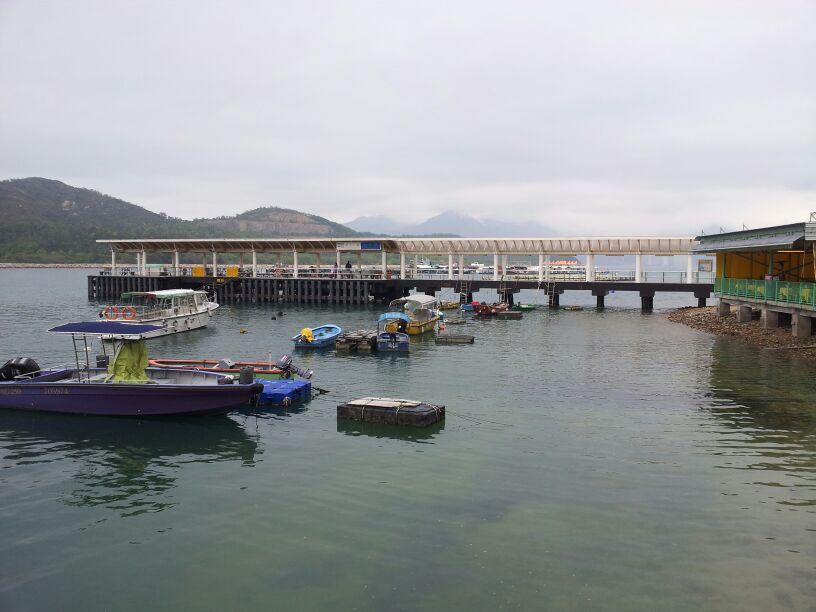
- Sok Kwu Wan Pier No. 2
- Location: Sok Kwu Wan First Street, Lamma Island
- Coordinates: 22.206128°N 114.131480°E
- Operator: Transport Department
- Maintained by: Civil Engineering and Development Department

Characteristics
- ID number: IP031

History
- Opening date: 4 March 1998; 28 years ago

Sok Kwu Wan Pier No. 2
- Traditional Chinese: 索罟灣二號碼頭
- Simplified Chinese: 索罟湾二号码头
Transcriptions
Standard Mandarin
- Hanyu Pinyin: Suǒ gǔ wān èr hào mǎ tóu
Yue: Cantonese
- Yale Romanization: Sok gú wāan yih houh máh tàuh
- Jyutping: Sok3 gu2 waan1 ji6 hou6 maa5 tau4

Sok Kwu Wan Pier No. 2 is a public pier located adjacent to Sok Kwu Wan Public Pier on the waterfront of Sok Kwu Wan in Sok Kwu Wan First Street, Lamma Island, Hong Kong. There is only one ferry service provided in the pier, which is the service between Sok Kwu Wan and Central, operated by Hong Kong & Kowloon Ferry.

== History ==
In the early days, the Hongkong and Yaumati Ferry’s ferries, licensed ferries, kaito and private yachts shared the Sok Kwu Wan Public Pier. As Sok Kwu Wan has become a popular tourist spot for local and overseas tourists, the pier is very crowded. In addition, due to its proximity to Aberdeen, it also attracts a large number of yachts, especially on weekends and public holidays. Residents in the area and the Hongkong and Yaumati Ferry have repeatedly complained about the congestion of the pier and insufficient berthing facilities. It is common for ships to berth in two rows. After reviewing the above situation, the Commissioner for Transport believes that it is necessary to increase berthing facilities to relieve congestion and improve safety.

In 1994 and 1995, the authorities planned to build new piers to provide berthing and landing facilities for the Hongkong and Yaumati Ferry and the public.

The construction of the pier started in February 1996 at a cost of HK$28 million. The pier opened on 4 March 1998, and the opening ceremony was officiated by the Director of Civil Engineering, Bernard Lam Moon-tim.
