= Ling Kok Shan =

Mountain in Hong Kong

- 菱角山
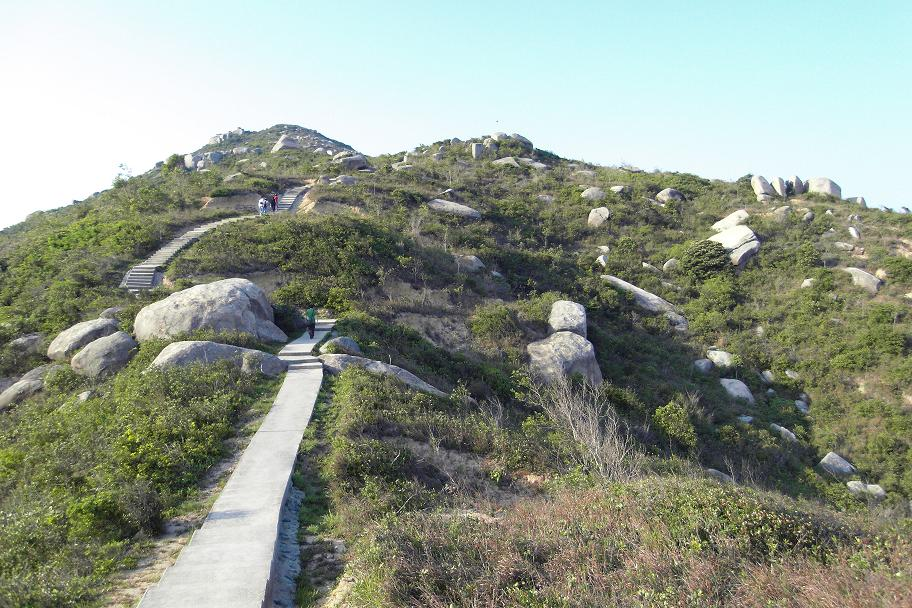
- The summit of Ling Kok Shan

Highest point
- Elevation: 250 m (820 ft)
- Coordinates: 22°12′14″N 114°08′12″E

Geography
- Location within Hong Kong
- Location: Lamma Island, New Territories, Hong Kong

Ling Kok Shan (Chinese: 菱角山) is the second highest peak on Lamma Island in Hong Kong, after Mount Stenhouse, with a height of 250 metres (820 ft) above sea level.

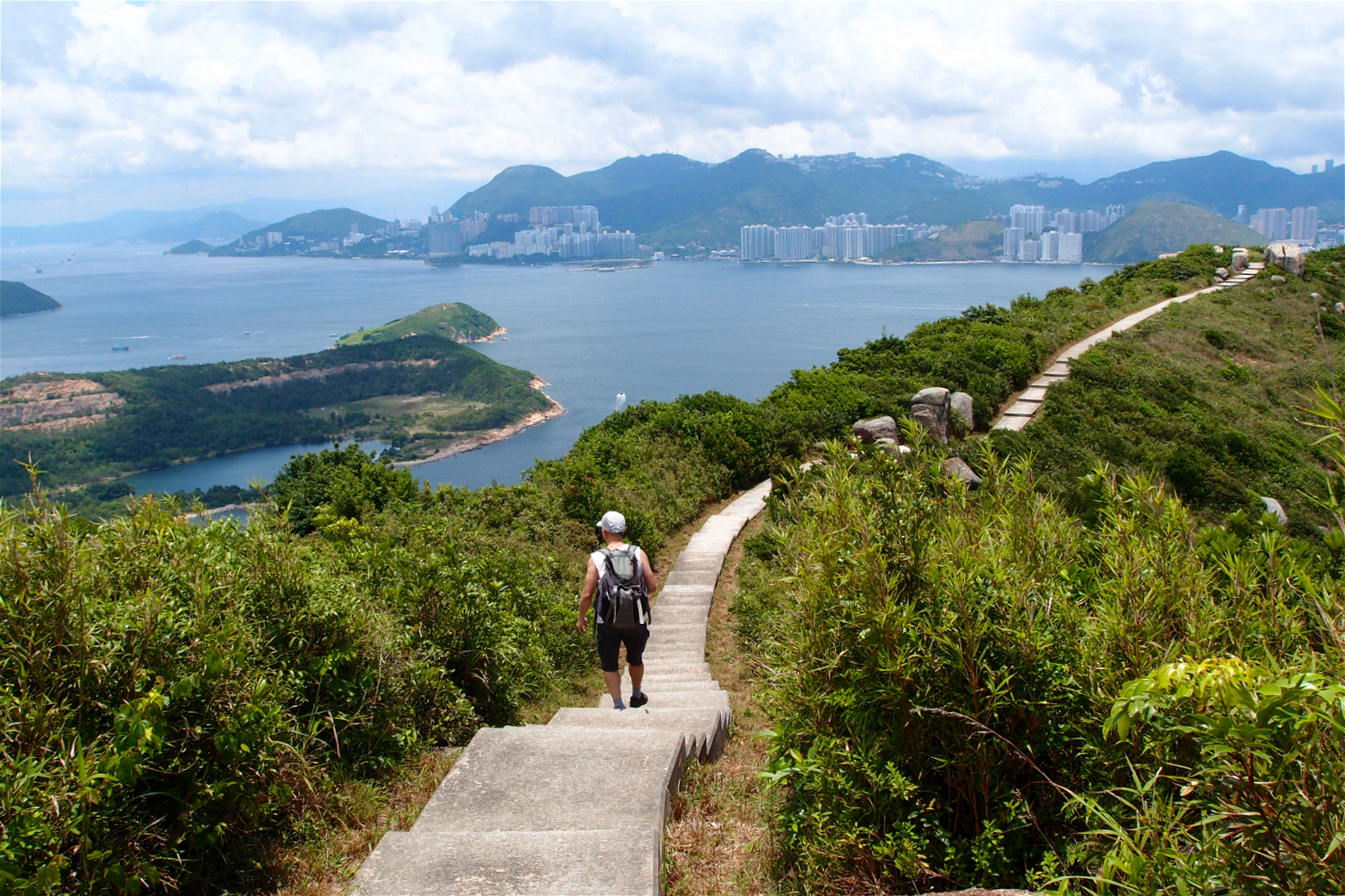
Trail on Ling Kok Shan

== Access ==
There is a concrete trail leading up to the summit. This is a gentle walk and can be done year-round.

== See also ==
- List of mountains, peaks and hills in Hong Kong
- Sok Kwu Wan
