= Luk Chau Village =

Village in Hong Kong

Coordinates: 22.217977°N 114.130997°E

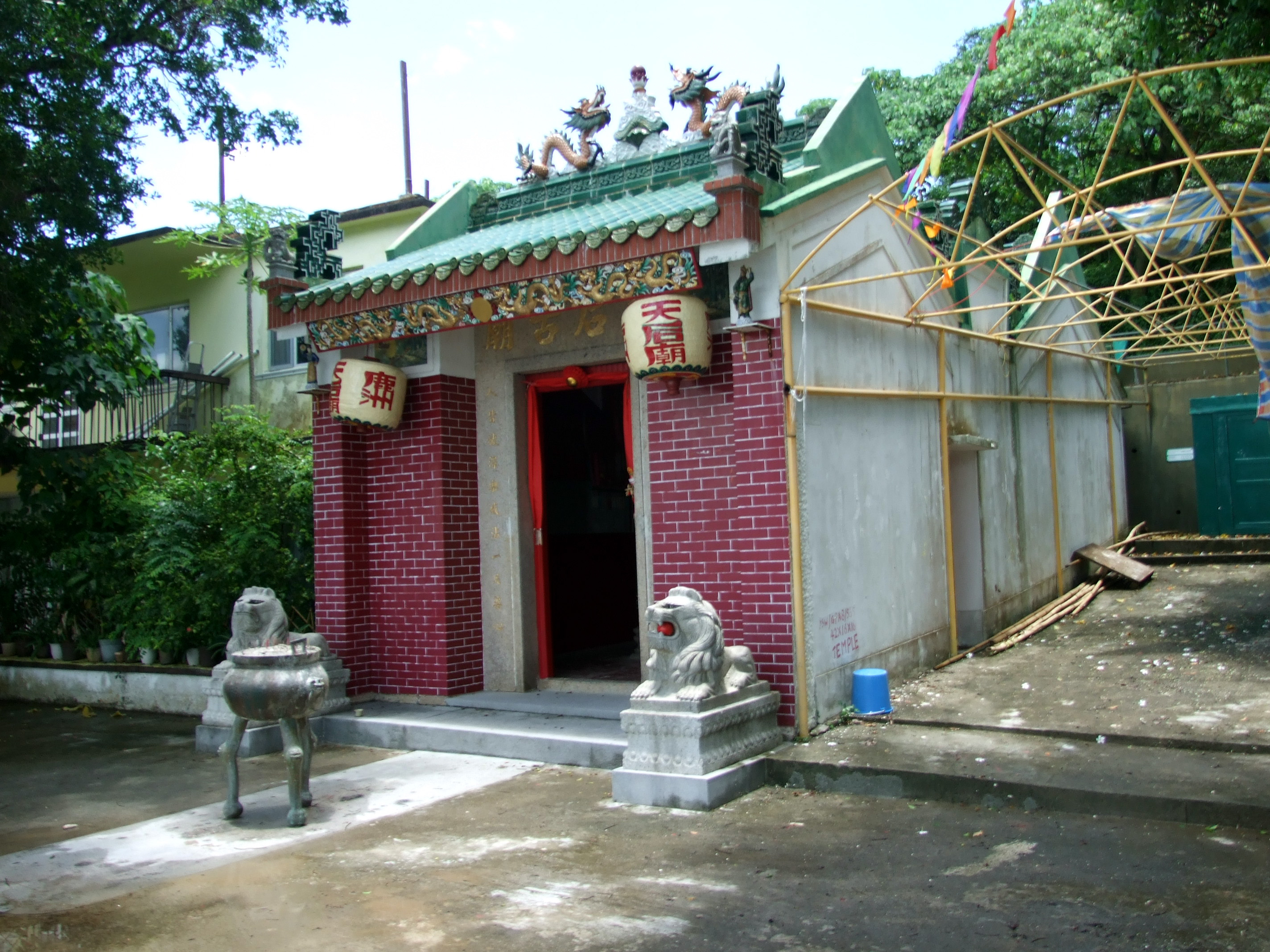
Tin Hau Temple in Luk Chau Village.

Luk Chau Village (Chinese: 鹿洲村; lit. 'deer islet') is a village located on the northeast coast of Lamma Island, the third largest island in the territory of Hong Kong.

== Administration ==
Luk Chau is a recognized village under the New Territories Small House Policy.

== History ==
Its original inhabitants of the villages were farmers and fishermen. They originated from Xixiang, Baoan in today's Shenzhen.

At the time of the 1911 census, the population of Luk Chau was 54. The number of males was 16. As of 2018, the village was home to a dozen families.

== Features ==
A Tin Hau Temple, built in 1868, is located in Luk Chau Village. Other deities are worshipped in the temple, including Pak Tai, Lung Mo, Kwan Tai and the Earth God.

== Access ==
Luk Chau can be access by speedboat from Aberdeen (15-minute ride) and by foot from Sok Kwu Wan (40 minutes).
