= Sok Kwu Wan =

Bay and town in Hong Kong

Coordinates: 22°12′18″N 114°7′54″E

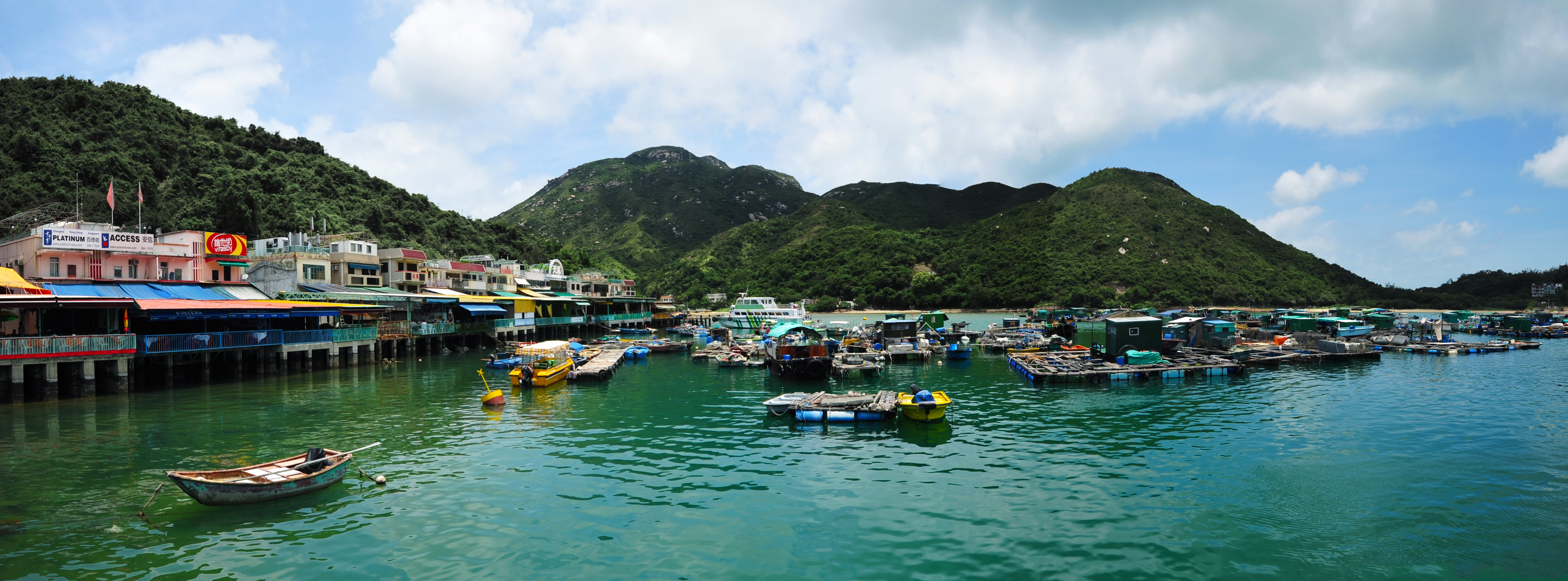
Sok Kwu Wan, Lamma Island in July 2011

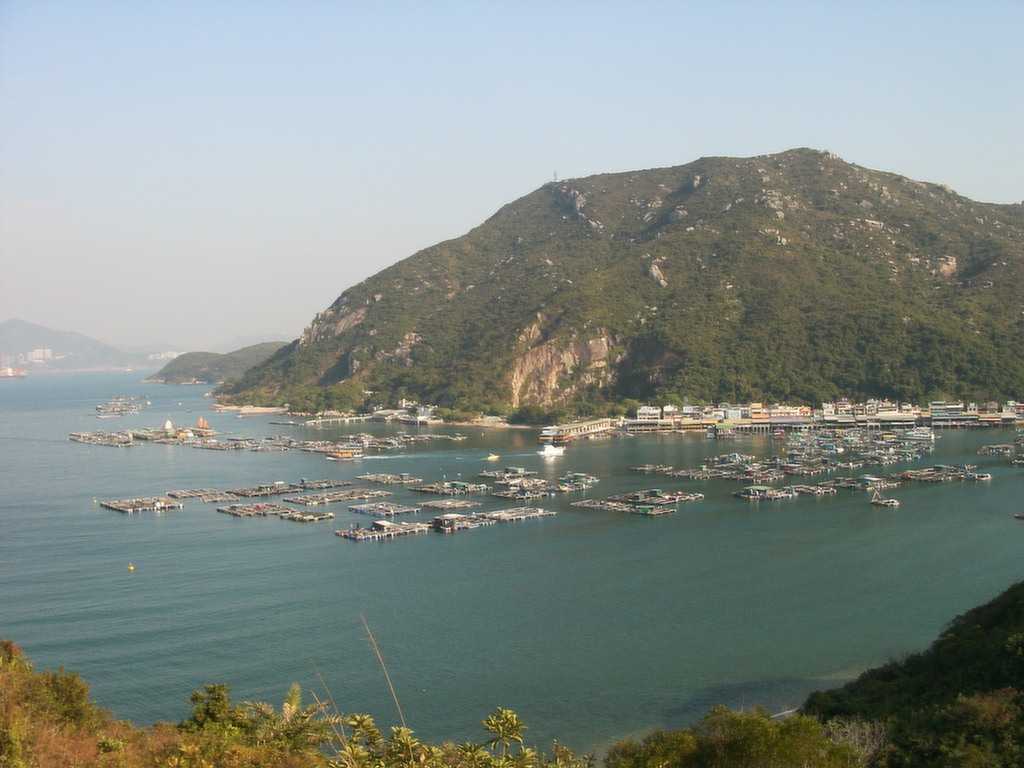
Sok Kwu Wan viewed from Lamma Island walk. Fish farming structures are visible in the bay.

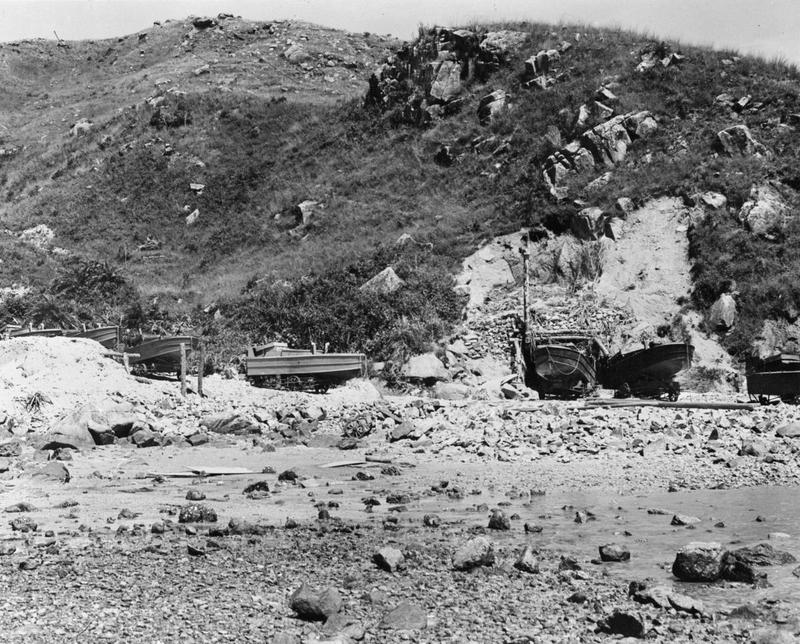
Japanese Shinyo fast motor boats, packed with high explosive and intended for use against allied shipping, found abandoned in Picnic Bay, Hong Kong after the surrender in September 1945. These light wooden craft are about 25 ft (0 mi) in length, painted green, and are ready in their launching trolleys.

Sok Kwu Wan (Chinese: 索罟灣) or Picnic Bay (野餐灣) is a bay on the east coast of Lamma Island, Hong Kong. The bay has a cluster of seafood restaurants and village houses.

== Administration ==
Sok Kwu Wan is a recognized village under the New Territories Small House Policy.

== Features ==
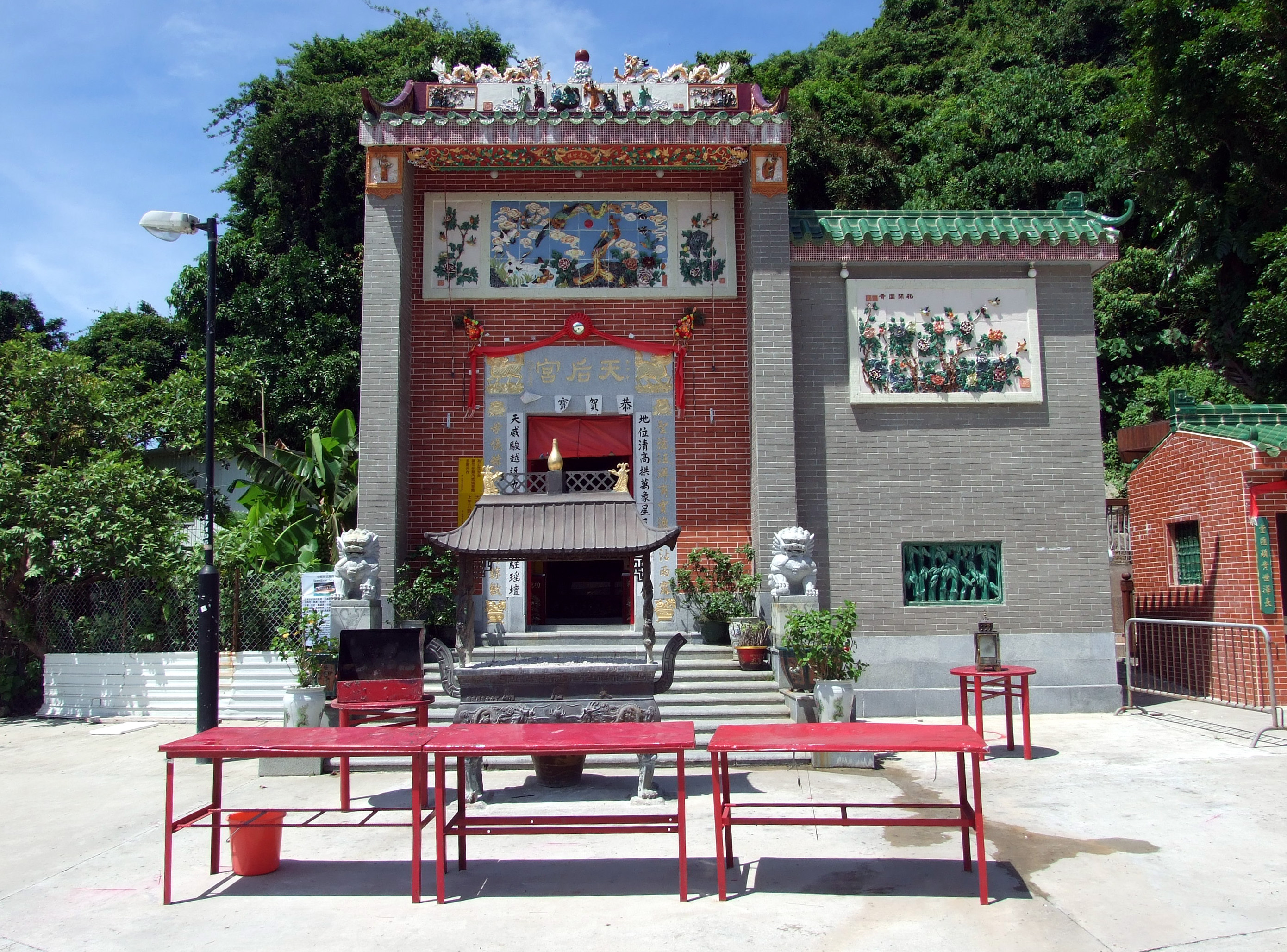
Tin Hau Temple in Sok Kwu Wan

Sok Kwu Wan is one of the 28 designated marine fish culture zones in Hong Kong.

There is a Tin Hau Temple in Sok Kwu Wan with some old and interesting artifacts from the pre-Qing period.

The Lamma Island Family Trail, a well-maintained path running from Sok Kwu Wan to Yung Shue Wan, connects the larger village on the North side of the island. There are several pagodas along the trail, as well as small information panels detailing aspects of the island's ecosystems and history. The trail is well-marked, with signs directing hikers to Luk Chau, Lamma Winds, Lo So Shing, and Tung O, as well as the villages on the North side of the island.

== Education ==
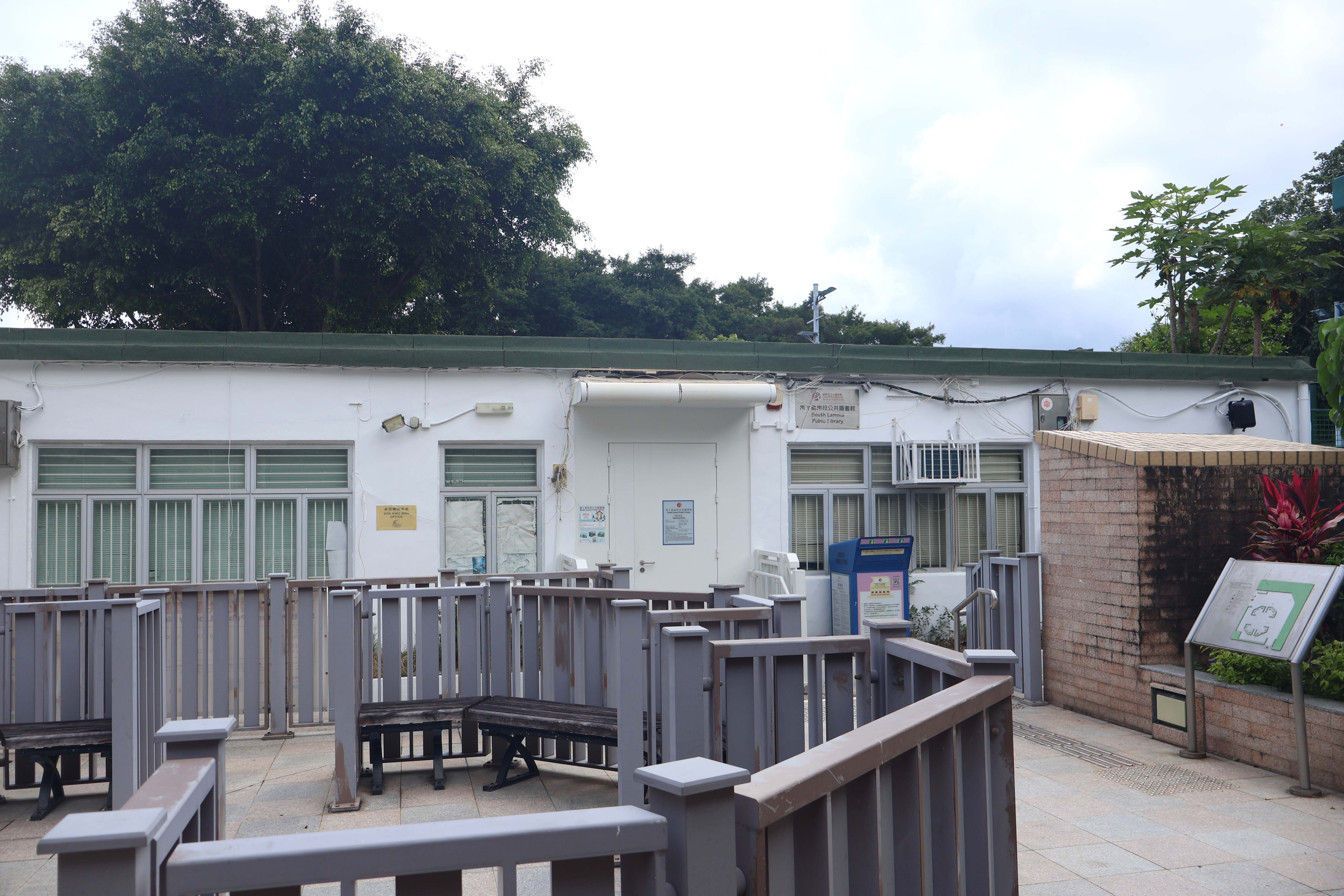
South Lamma Public Library

Lamma Island is in Primary One Admission (POA) School Net 96, which contains a single aided school, Northern Lamma School; no government primary schools are in this net.

Hong Kong Public Libraries operates South Lamma Public Library at Sok Kwu Wan.

== Law enforcement ==
The Hong Kong Police Force operates the Sok Kwu Wan Police Post.

== Environmental conservation ==
Paths from the village's ferry pier leads to several beaches, some of which are overseen by Hong Kong Leisure and Cultural Services Department and the Agriculture, Fisheries and Conservation Department (AFCD). Sham Wan, one of these beaches, is well known as a breeding location for endangered green sea turtles, and an AFCD facility on the beach is staffed from June to October in order to prevent access to the beach during breeding season. The Hong Kong YMCA maintains a small camp facility on the shore of the bay opposite from the village of Sok Kwu Wan, which sits on several acres of forested land that has been under consideration for status as protected land. The camp is used for outdoor youth education. The entirety of South Lamma has been suggested several times for conservation status under the auspices of AFCD.

== Future developments ==
The village, itself, has been the subject of some interesting debate concerning environmental protection and urban expansion. A planned community is under discussion to be developed at the site of Sok Kwu Wan's abandoned quarry. The development could house an anticipated additional 6,000 residents on the island, including an additional 1900 units with 700 reserved for subsidized housing, a 260 suite hotel, and facilities for water sports. Development plans were last reported to have been shelved until 2025. The site plans to preserve a green belt consisting of natural mudflats, a lake, and many acres of pristine woodlands. Locals voiced interest in a potential eco-tourism resort rather than large-scale residential development. Recent developments regarding the real estate development talks show that the development plans may be changed to environmentally protected areas on a large scale, which may provide some interesting opportunities for local small business.

== Transport ==
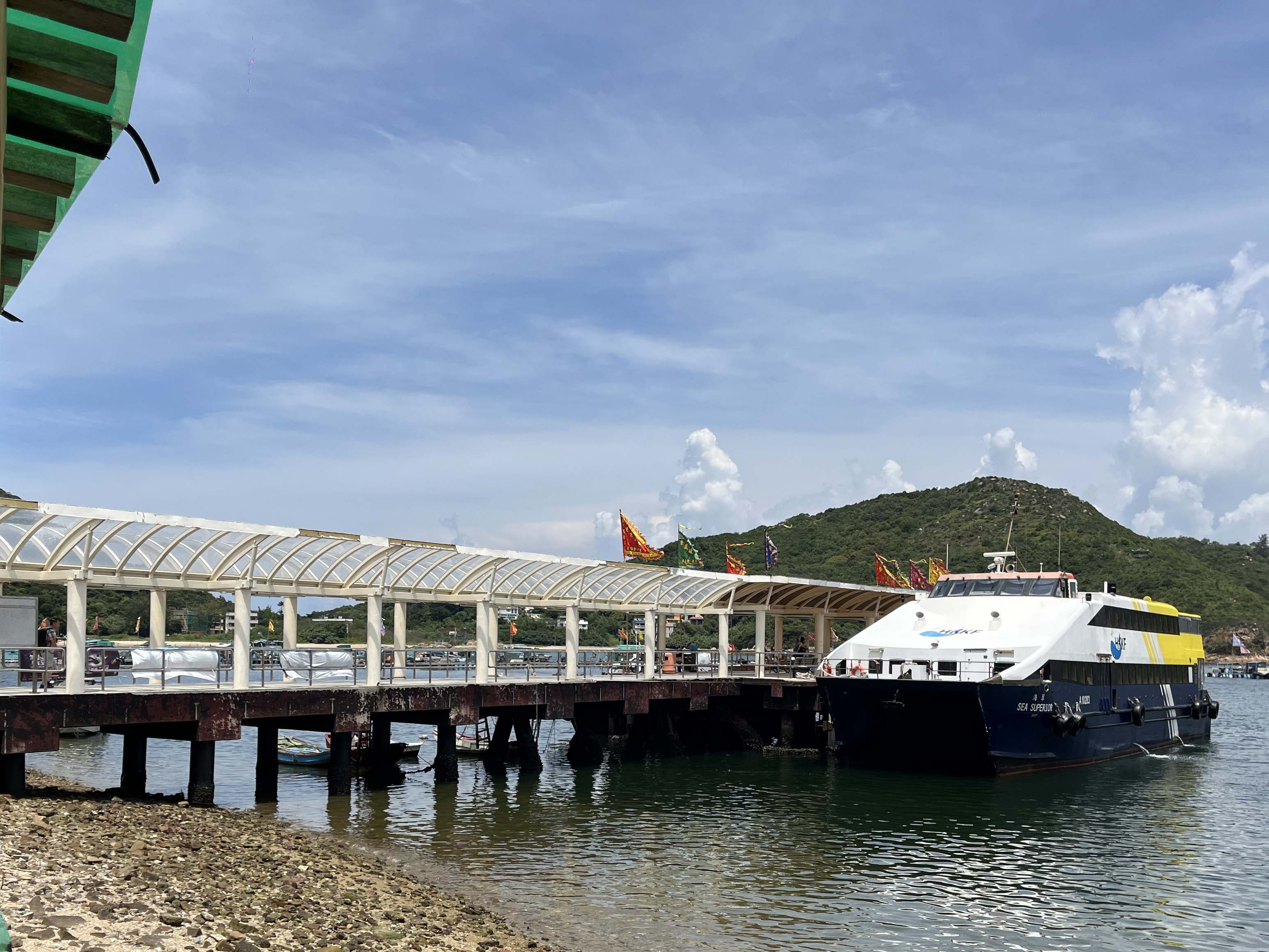
Sok Kwu Wan Pier No. 2

The village is serviced by ferries from the Outlying Ferry Pier No. 4 in Central, taking 35 to 45 minutes, and from Aberdeen via Mo Tat by Chuen Kee Ferry, taking about 30 minutes.

== See also ==
- Sok Kwu Wan Pier No. 2
- Sok Kwu Wan Public Pier
- Ling Kok Shan
