= Yung Shue Ha =

Village in Hong Kong

Coordinates: 22.19969°N 114.14092°E

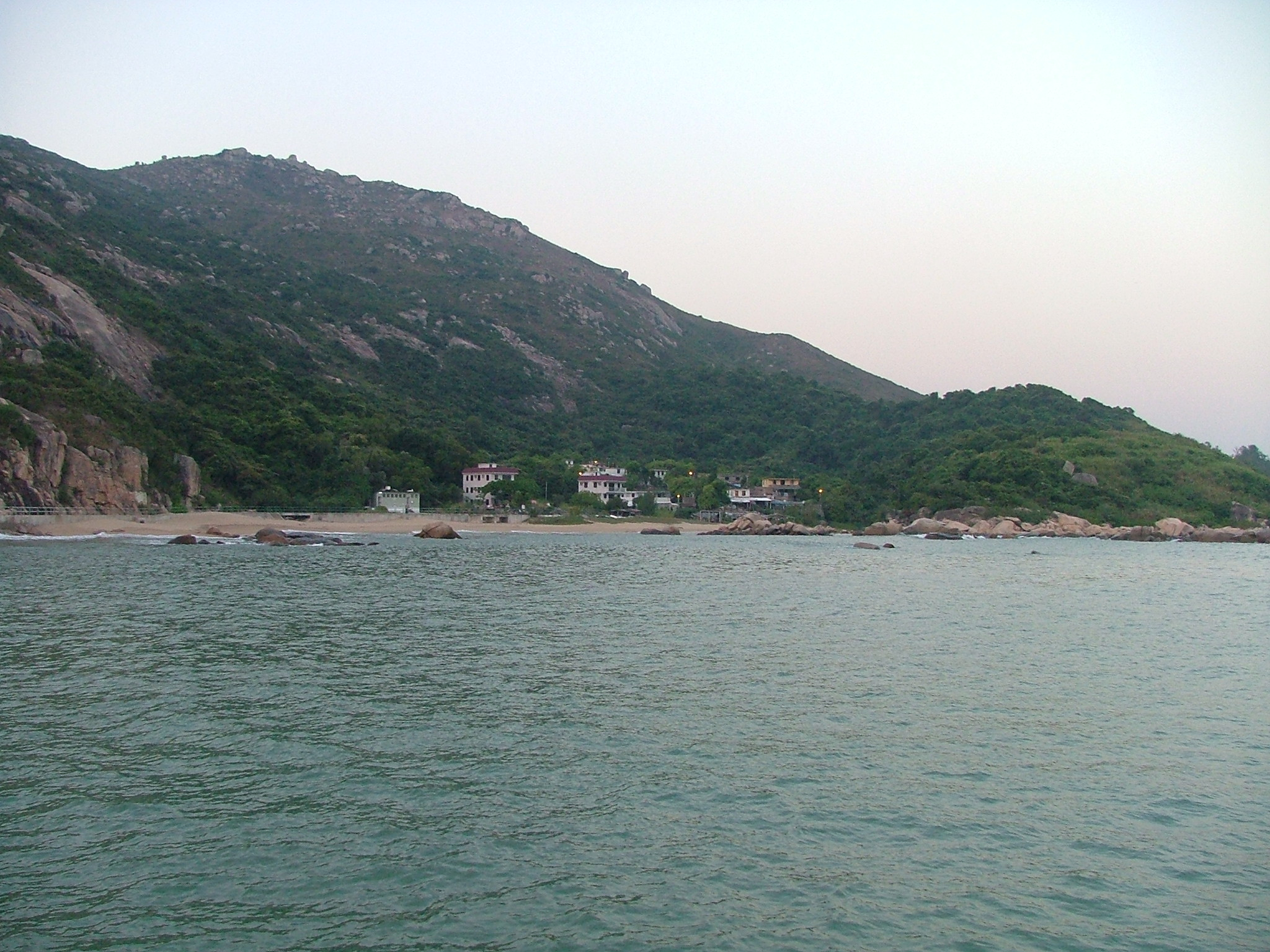
Yung Shue Ha viewed from the Tung O Wan ferry pier across Shek Pai Wan.

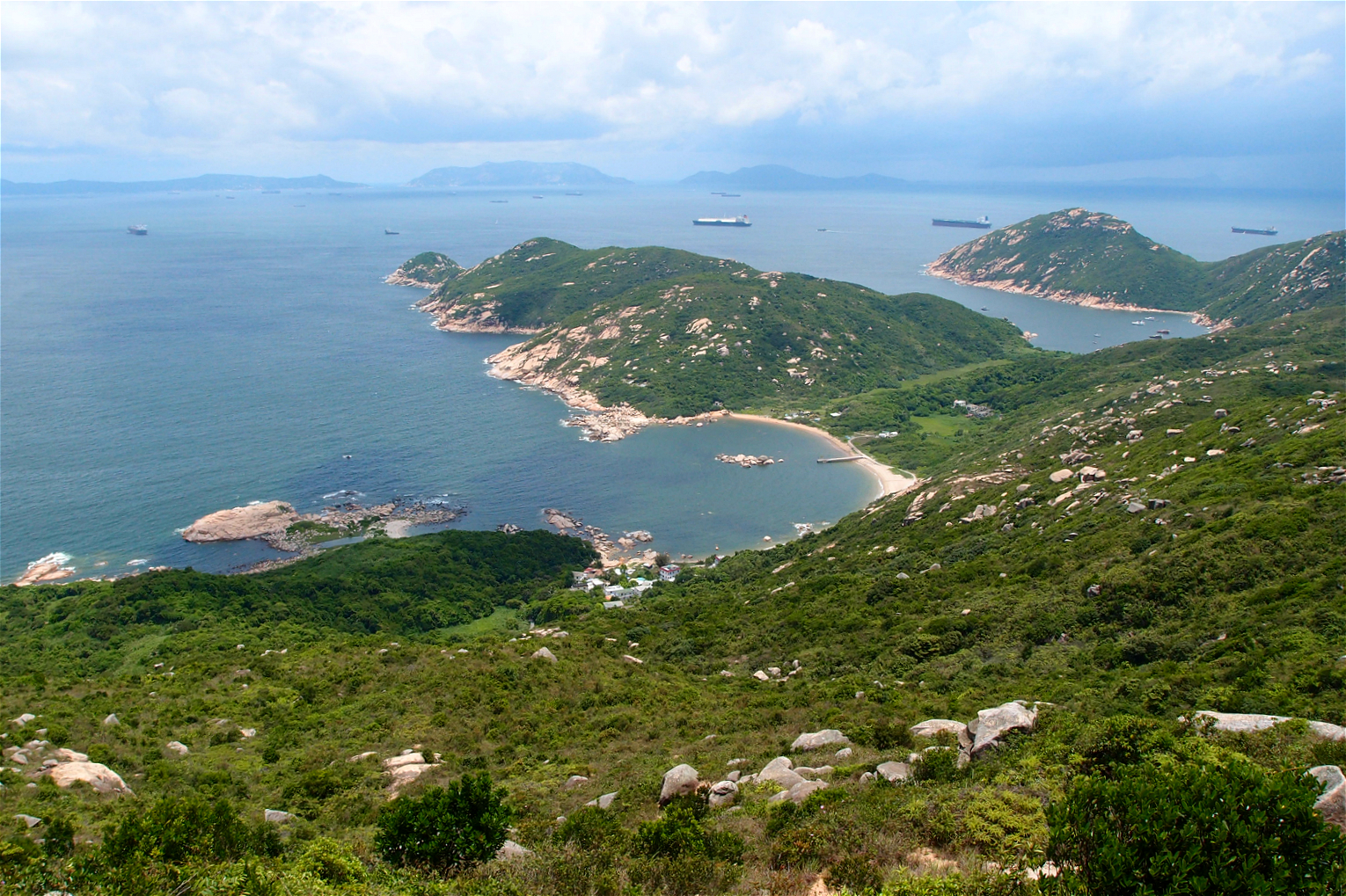
View of Yung Shue Ha, Shek Pai Wan and Tung O from Ling Kok Shan.

Yung Shue Ha (Chinese: 榕樹下; lit. 'under the banyan tree') is a village on the south side of Lamma Island, Hong Kong. It is across the bay Shek Pai Wan (石排灣) from the village of Tung O (東澳). Both villages are sparsely populated and many places are abandoned.

== Administration ==
Tung O and Yung Shue Ha are recognized village under the New Territories Small House Policy.

== Features ==
A small Hung Shing Temple, built in 1824, is located at the far western end of the beach between Yung Shue Ha and Tung O.

== Transportation ==
Yung Shue Ha can be reached by ferry from Sok Kwu Wan via walking trail. At the north end of Sok Kwu Wan by the Tin Hau Temple is a very steep walking trail that leads to Yung Shue Ha via Tung O. It can also be reached by walking 25 minutes on a relatively flat trail from Mo Tat Wan village. A ferry service from Aberdeen, in the southern part of Hong Kong island, stops in Mot Tat Wan before going on to Sok Kwu Wan. In addition, a "sampan" or water taxi service from Aberdeen is available for a price of approximately 180HKD or US$23.40. Due to the currents in the area only a few water taxis will take passengers to the village.

== See also ==
- List of buildings, sites, and areas in Hong Kong
