= Yung Shue Wan =

Population centre of Lamma Island, Hong Kong

Coordinates: 22°13′35″N 114°6′43″E

- Traditional Chinese: 榕樹灣
- Simplified Chinese: 榕树湾
- Literal meaning: Banyan tree bay
Transcriptions
Standard Mandarin
- Hanyu Pinyin: Róng Shù Wān
Yue: Cantonese
- Jyutping: Jung4 Syu6 Waan1

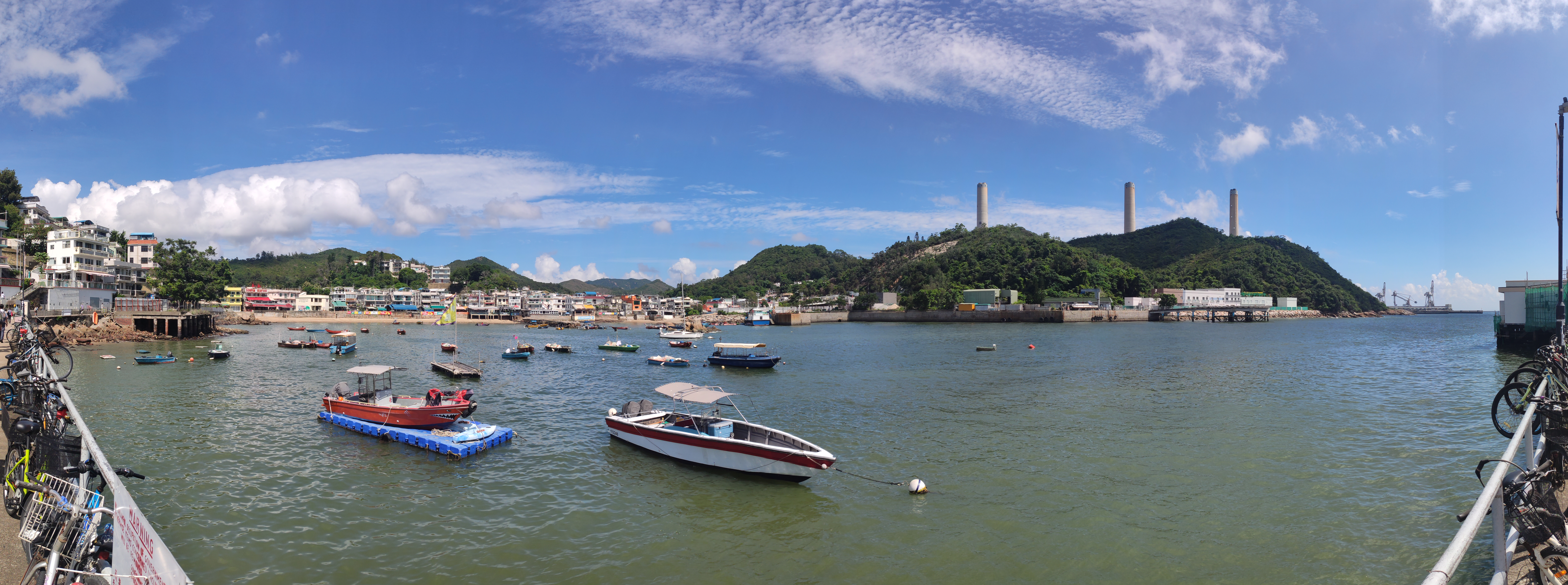
Yung Shue Wan from the Lamma Island ferry terminal

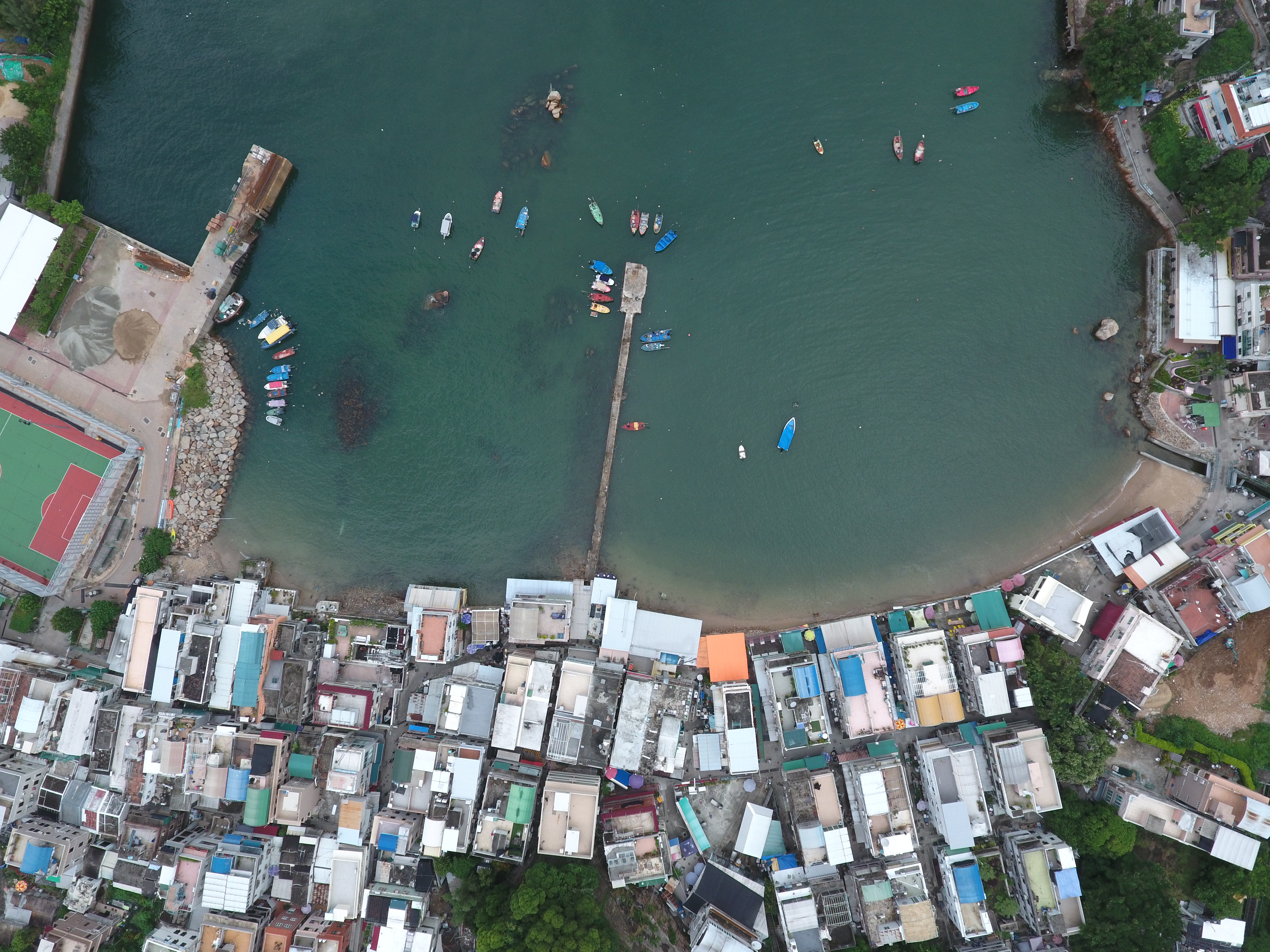
An aerial view of Yung Shue Wan's main street and surrounding areas

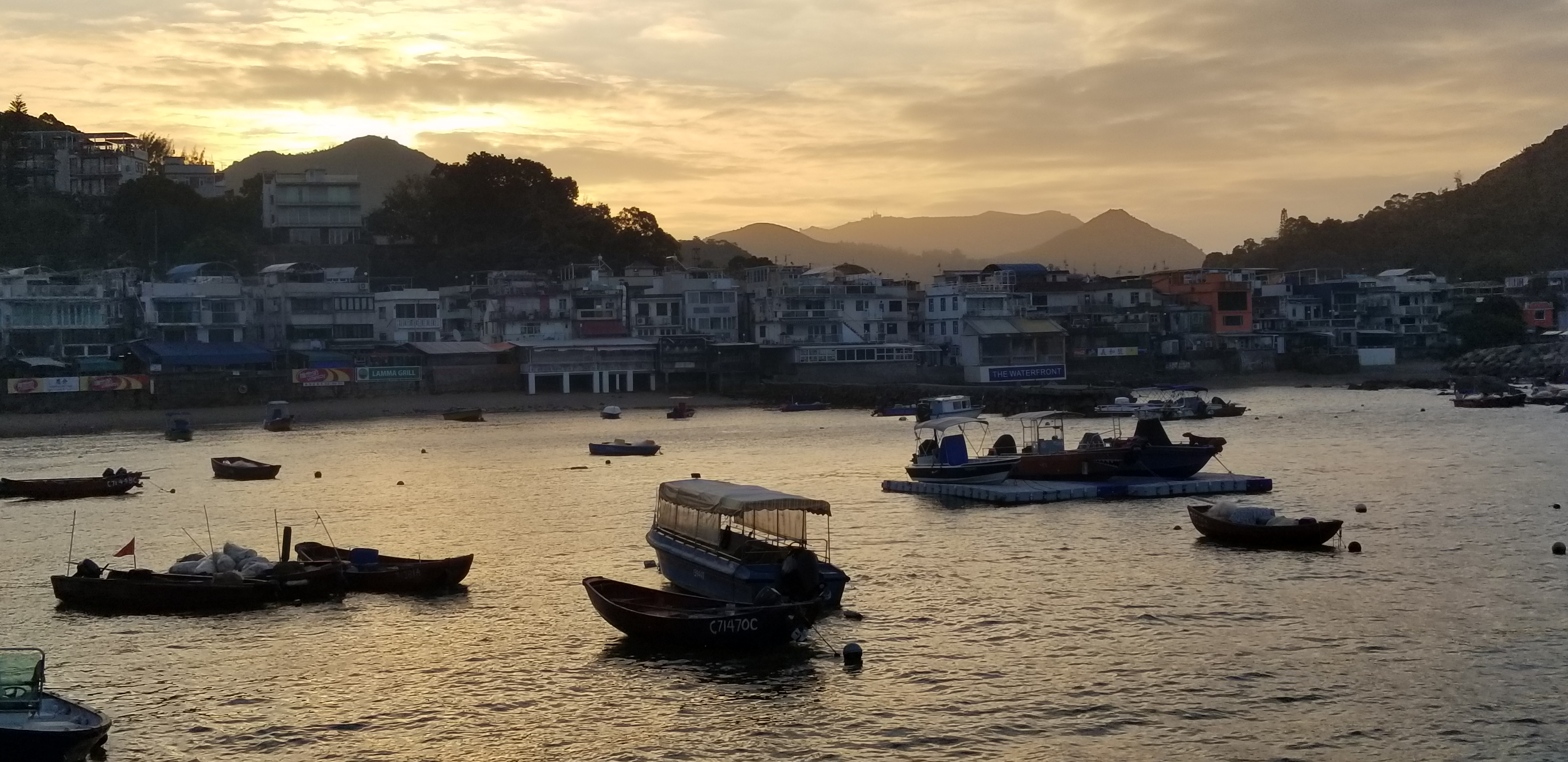
Sunrise behind Yung Shue Wan from the ferry pier

Yung Shue Wan is the main population centre on Lamma Island, Hong Kong. It has a population of approximately 6,000.

== Administration ==
Yung Shue Wan is a recognized village under the New Territories Small House Policy.

== Features ==
The village is a mix of residential properties, shops and restaurants. Yung Shue Wan gives a Mediterranean feeling when walking through it. In addition to the indigenous residents, the quiet and laid-back lifestyle make it an attractive and popular living location for middle-class commuters. It is popular with expatriates.

There is a Tin Hau Temple in Yung Shue Wan.

== Transport ==
Yung Shue Wan can be reached by ferry from the Outlying Islands Ferry Pier No. 4 in Central, which takes about 25 minutes, or from Aberdeen, which takes about 35 minutes.

=== Lamma Island ferry collision ===
On 1 October 2012, at approximately 20:20 HKT, a ferry and another passenger vessel collided off Yung Shue Wan, Lamma Island, Hong Kong. The day was the National Day of the People's Republic of China, and one of the ships was headed for the commemorative firework display, scheduled to take place half an hour later. With 39 killed and more than 100 injured, the incident was the deadliest maritime disaster in Hong Kong since 1971.

== Education ==
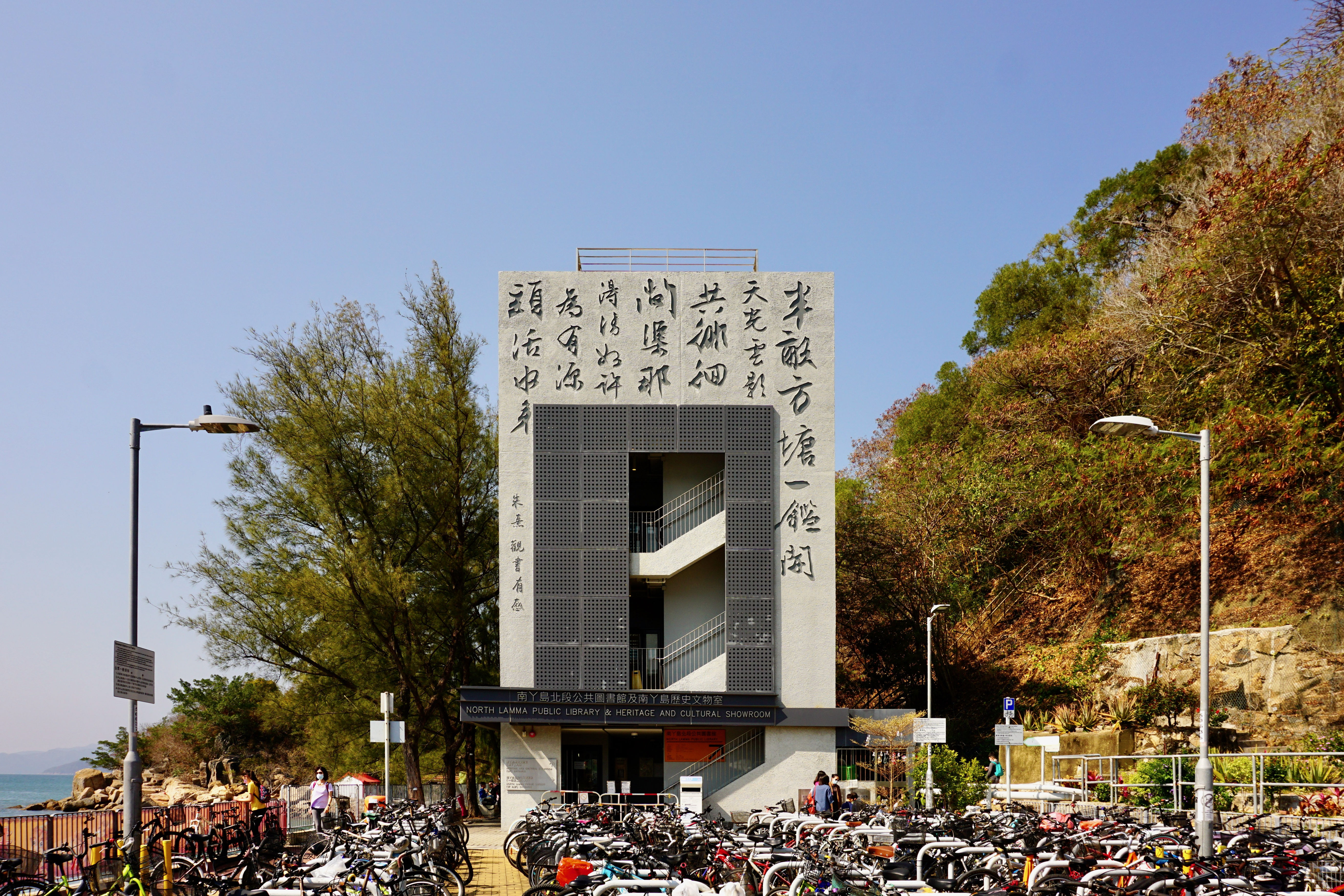
North Lamma Public Library

Lamma Island is in Primary One Admission (POA) School Net 96, which contains a single aided school, Northern Lamma School; no government primary schools are in this net.

Hong Kong Public Libraries operates North Lamma Public Library at Yung Shue Wan.

== Law enforcement ==
The Hong Kong Police Force operates the Lamma Island Police Post.

== Gallery ==
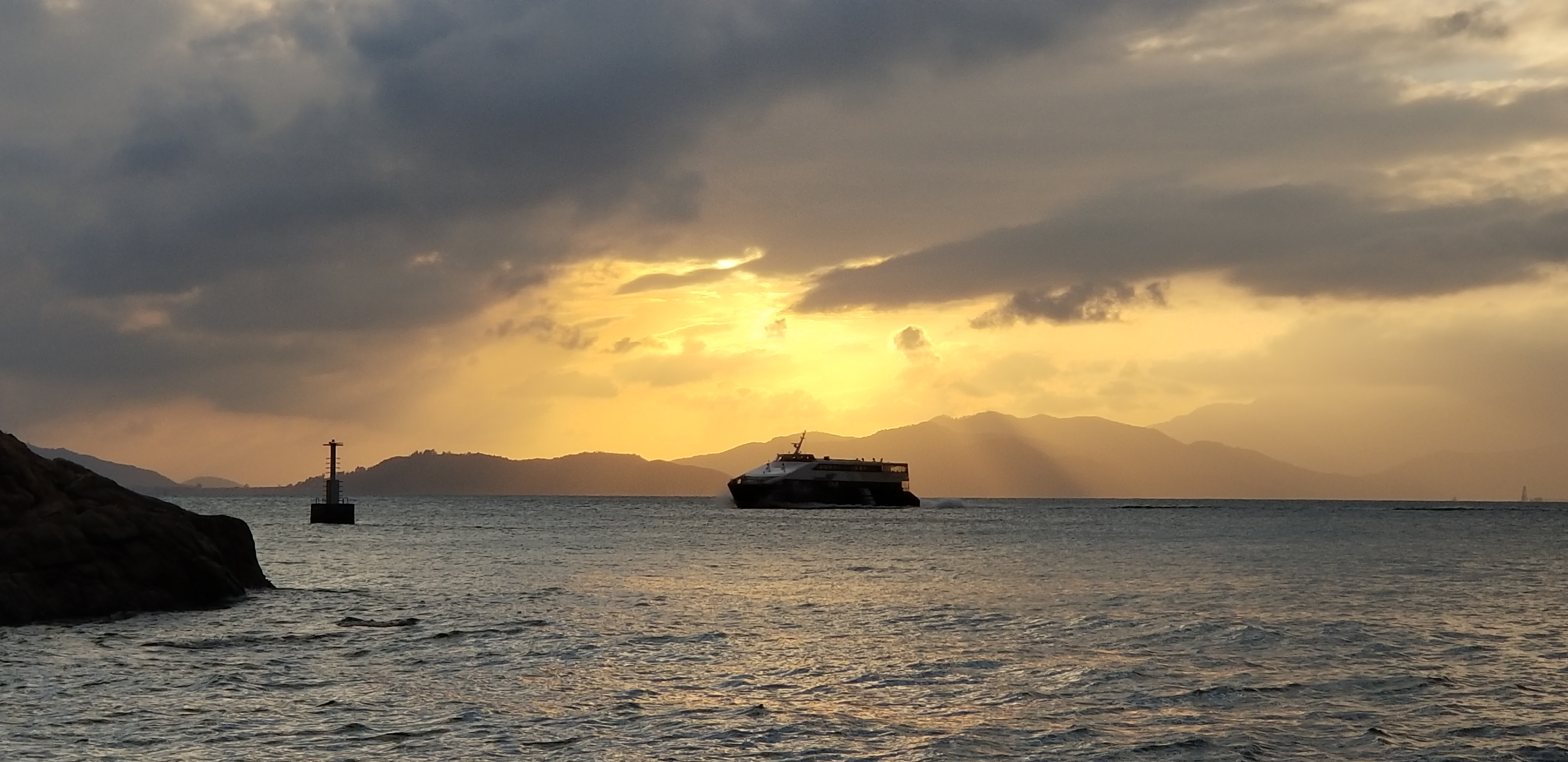
Sunset near Yung Shue Wan. The Central–Yung Shue Wan ferry (from Hong Kong Island to Lamma Island) is visible; Cheung Chau and Lantau Island are in the background.

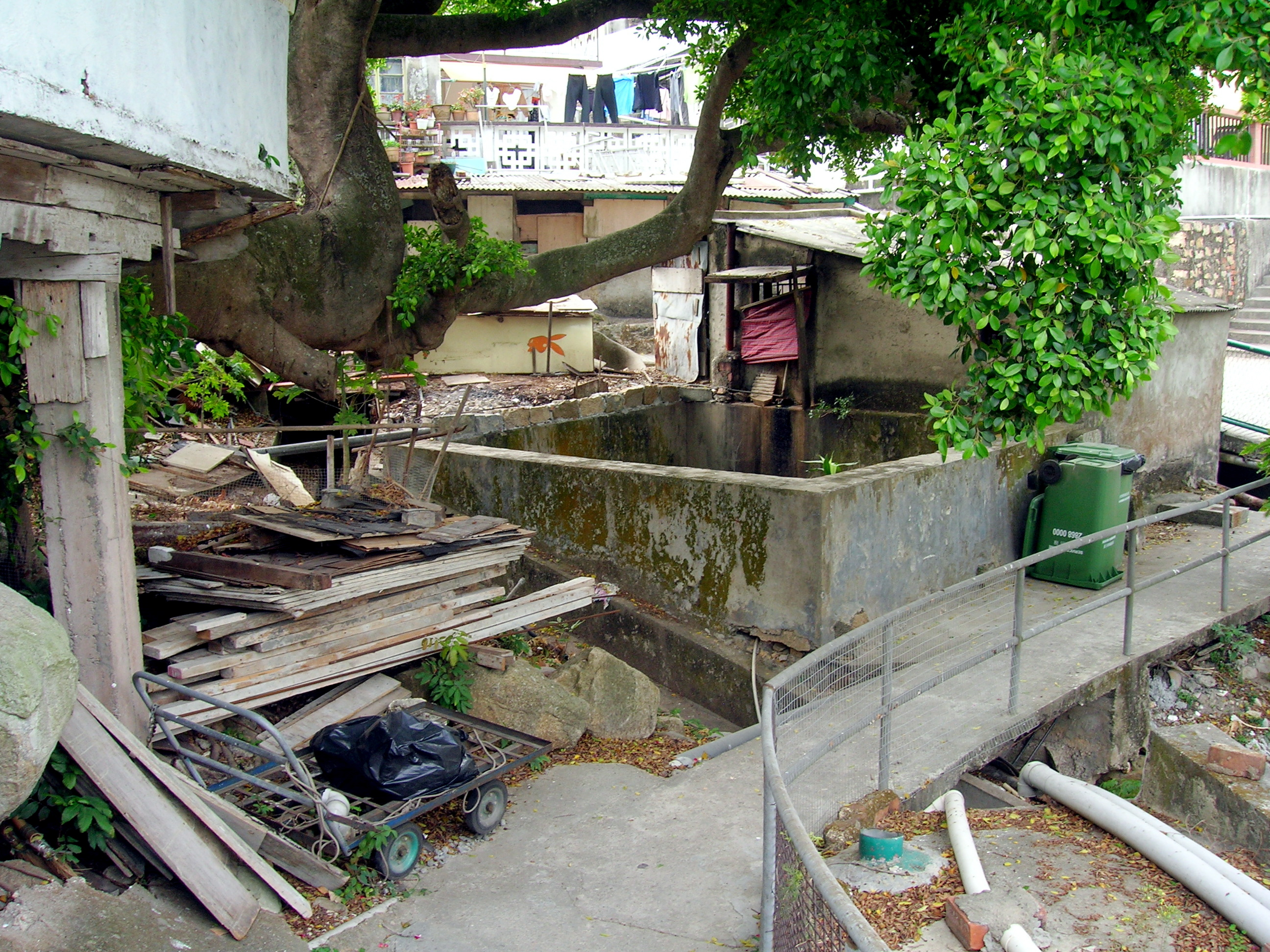
Yung Shue Wan tenement homes reusing old materials.

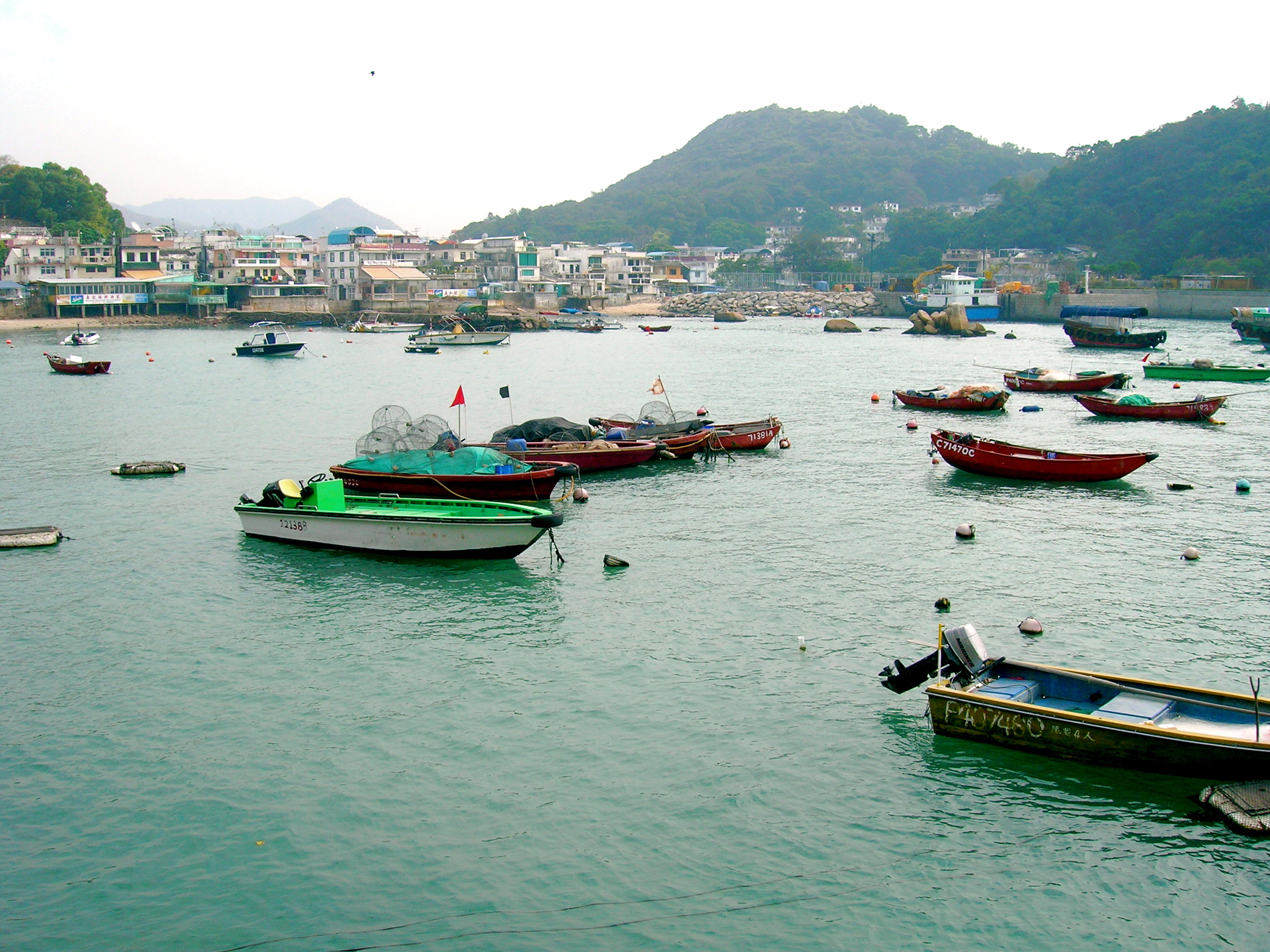
Yung Shue Wan bay boats resting in the low tide.

== See also ==
- List of places in Hong Kong
- Sha Po Old Village
- Sok Kwu Wan
