= Sham Wan (Lamma Island) =

Bay of Lamma Island, Hong Kong

Coordinates: 22.185527°N 114.138754°E

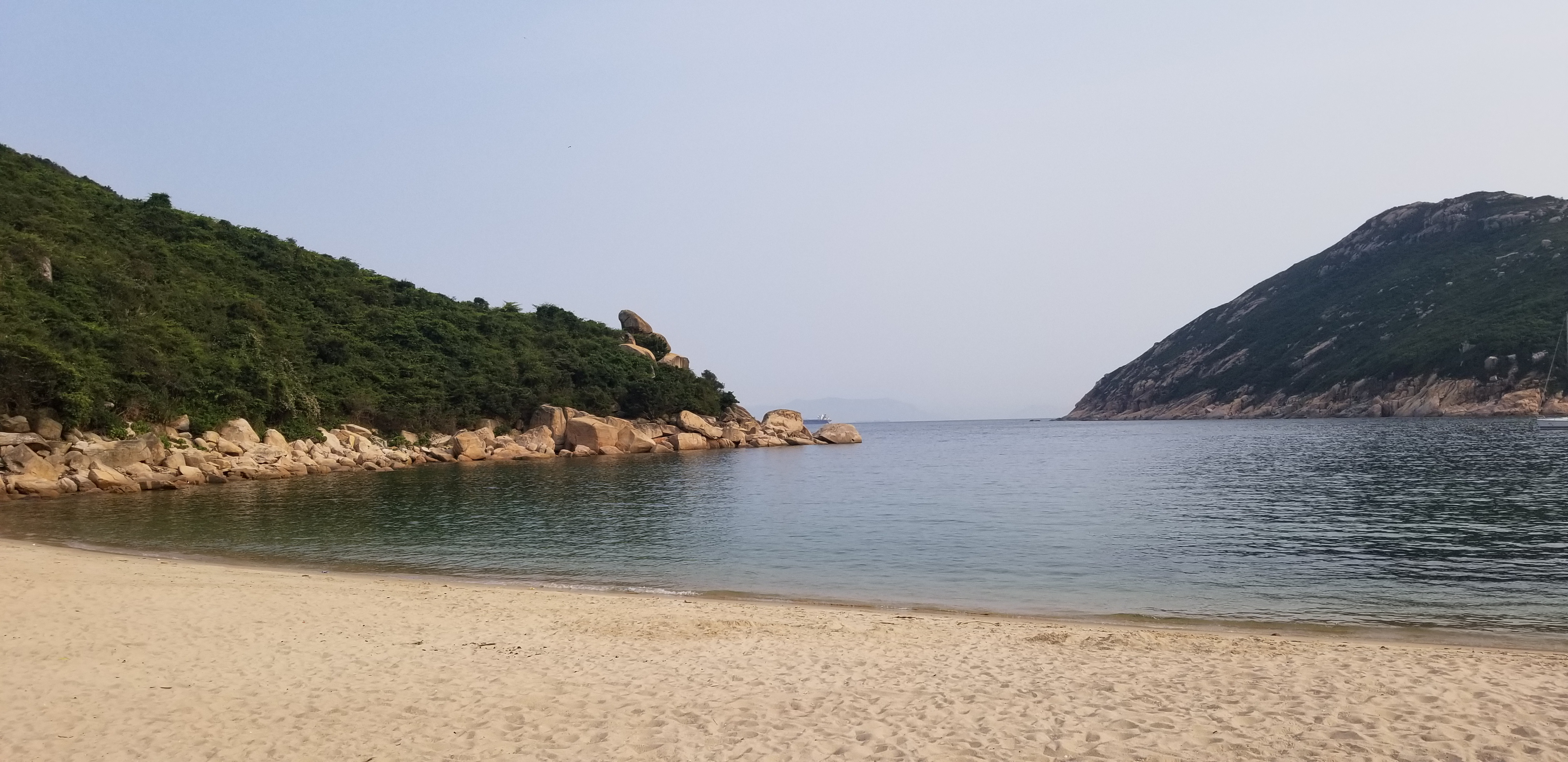
Sham Wan beach.

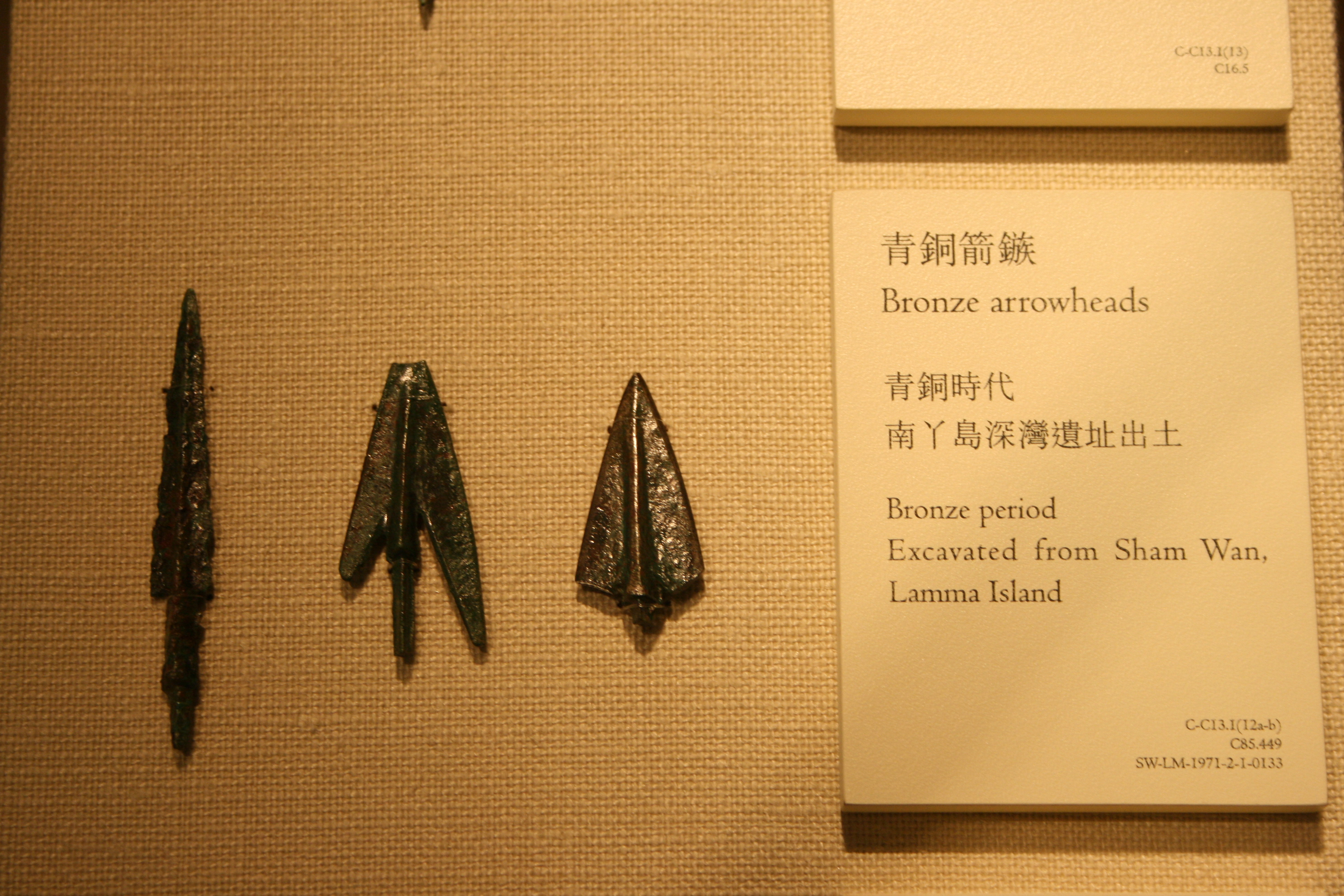
Bronze arrowheads excavated from Sham Wan. On display at Hong Kong Museum of History.

Sham Wan (Chinese: 深灣) is a bay in the southeastern part of Lamma Island in Hong Kong.

== Archaeological site ==
Sham Wan is one of the five most important archaeological sites in Hong Kong. The bay is the site of an important Bronze Age settlement which was unearthed by archaeologists in the 1970s. It yielded evidence of people living on Lamma during the "Middle Neolithic" phase (c. 3800–3000 BC).

== Fauna ==
Historically, Sham Wan has also been a place for green sea turtles to lay eggs. The endangered green turtles are a special group of marine organisms with distinctive navigation behaviour between their nesting, breeding, development and reproduction sites.

=== Access Restriction ===
As Sham Wan is the only existing nesting site for green sea turtles in Hong Kong, the beach and adjacent waters are closed to the general public every year from 1 April to 31 October to allow the turtles to breed. Unauthorised entry during that period of restricted access is subject to a maximum fine of $50,000HKD. The breeding site is about 5,100 m^{2} (54,896 sq ft). The last known nesting at Sham Wan was in 2012.

A part of the bay has been listed as a Site of Special Scientific Interest since 1999.
