= Lamma Island =

Outlying island of Hong Kong

南丫島
- Locator map for Lamma island

Geography
- Area: 13.55 km^{2} (5.23 sq mi)
- Length: 7 km (4.3 mi)
- Highest elevation: 353 m (1158 ft)
- Highest point: Mount Stenhouse (山地塘)

Administration
- Hong Kong
- Region: New Territories
- District: Islands District

Demographics
- Population: ≈7,000
- Ethnic groups: 55% Chinese; 23% White; 11.4% Filipino

Lamma Island
- Traditional Chinese: 南丫島
- Simplified Chinese: 南丫岛
Transcriptions
Standard Mandarin
- Hanyu Pinyin: Nán yā dǎo
Yue: Cantonese
- Yale Romanization: Nàahm ā dóu
- Jyutping: Naam^{4} aa^{1} dou^{2}

Pok Liu Chau
- Chinese: 博寮洲
Transcriptions
Standard Mandarin
- Hanyu Pinyin: Bóliáozhōu
Yue: Cantonese
- Yale Romanization: Bok lìuh jāu
- Jyutping: Bok^{3} liu^{4} zau^{1}

Pok Liu
- Chinese: 博寮
Transcriptions
Standard Mandarin
- Hanyu Pinyin: Bóliáo
Yue: Cantonese
- Yale Romanization: Bok lìuh
- Jyutping: Bok^{3} liu^{4}

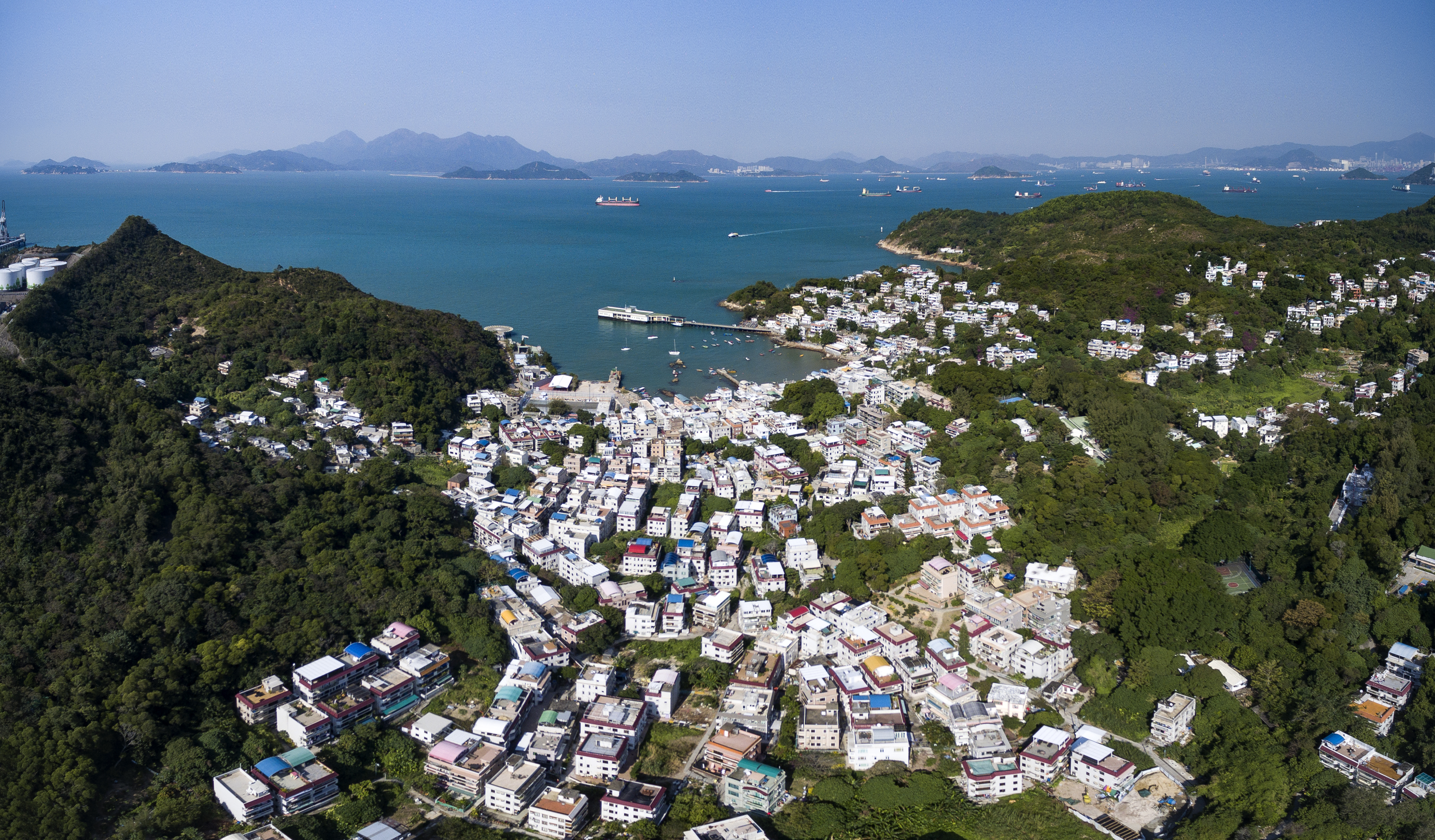
Aerial view of Yung Shue Wan, Lamma Island

Lamma Island, also known as Y Island, Pok Liu Chau or simply Pok Liu, is the third largest island in Hong Kong. Administratively, it is part of the Islands District. Lamma Island is a rural area.

Lamma Island is Hong Kong’s third-largest outlying island. Car-free and located a 30-minute ferry ride from Central Pier, the island features nature trails, seafood restaurants, and multicultural communities.

== Name ==
The island was named Lamma because of a chart reading error by Alexander Dalrymple in the 1760s. He acquired a Portuguese chart of the entrance to the Pearl River. Close to the west of the island, the Portuguese owner had written "Lama". Dalrymple misinterpreted that as the name of the island. However, it was a Portuguese note describing the consistency of the seabed for the sake of anchoring there. The Portuguese word "lama" refers to mud. In early charts the name was spelled with only one "m". The island acquired a British name by error. The name was acculturated phonetically in characters, "Lam a" can mean "south fork" in Cantonese, with the original muddle being all but forgotten. At some point, things became further obscured by the addition of the second "m" in the English spelling.

In ancient times, Lamma used to be named as Pok Liu or Pok Liu Chau.

== Geography ==
Lamma Island is located to the southwest of Hong Kong Island. It is the third largest island of Hong Kong, with an area of 13.55 km^{2} (5.23 sq mi) and a length of 7 kilometres (4.3 mi). The northern village is called Yung Shue Wan (Banyan Tree Bay) and the eastern village is called Sok Kwu Wan (Rainbow Bay, literally Cable Fishing Net Bay). Few people live on the southern part of Lamma. Access for much of this part is by hiking or private boat. Beaches along Lamma's south-facing edge include Yung Shue Ha Beach and Sham Wan.

Mount Stenhouse (山地塘, Shan Tei Tong) is the tallest mountain in Lamma at 353 metres (1,158 feet) above sea level, situated between Sok Kwu Wan and Sham Wan. Unusually shaped rocks can be found all over this mountain, but a grueling hike is necessary to access these.

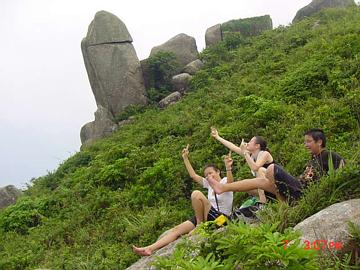
Example of a naturally formed rock found near the summit of Mt. Stenhouse.

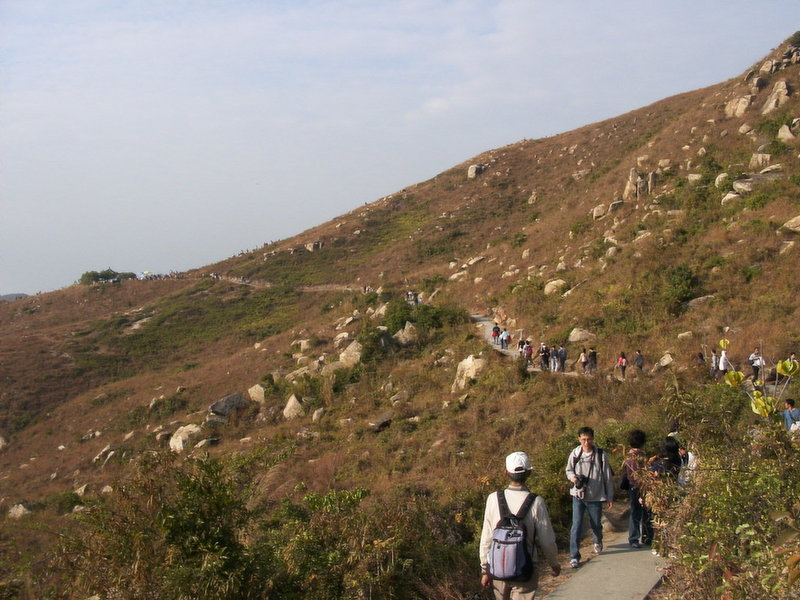
Walking the trail between Sok Kwu Wan and Yung Shue Wan

== History ==
According to archaeological findings, human settlement on the northern and eastern part of Lamma Island can be traced back to around 4000–3000 BC, the Middle Neolithic and Bronze Ages. Yung Shue Ha, one of Lamma's earliest villages, was settled in the early 19th century by a clan from China's Bao'an County.

== Demographics ==
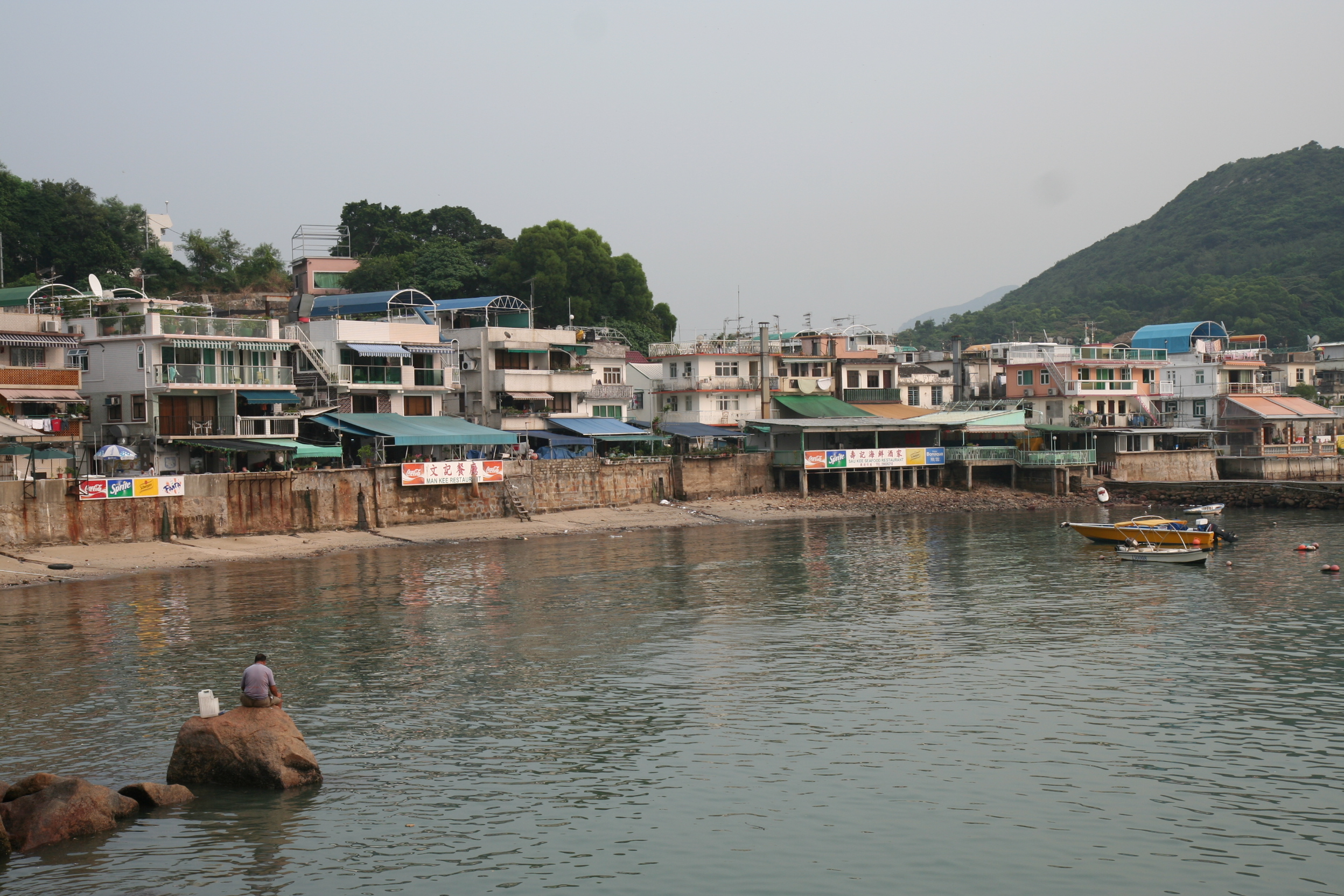
Yung Shue Wan.

Lamma has an estimated population of 5,900 people as of 2014. However, with future developments, such as a planned beach community in Sok Kwu Wan, the population capacity is expected to double to 11,000 residents.

Actor Chow Yun-fat (周潤發) grew up on the island in the village of Wang Long near Yung Shue Wan. His relatives used to operate a seafood restaurant called "Shau Kee" in the main village.

Lamma has a significant Western and international population. According to the 2021 population census, the island is 55% Chinese, 23% white European and 11.4% Filipino.

The island has a reputation for alternative lifestyles and has a relaxed atmosphere. Lamma is currently being urbanised and property prices are increasing as a result.

== Description ==
In contrast to Hong Kong Island and Kowloon, Lamma is peaceful and tranquil with an abundance of natural scenery. Buildings higher than three storeys are prohibited and there are no automobiles but diminutive fire trucks and ambulances, as well as village vehicles; distinctive open-back vehicles to transport construction materials. The community's only means of transport is either by foot or bicycle.

Lamma provides an alternative to the hectic life in the city. Property and rents are cheap compared with those of central Hong Kong. These factors have attracted a significant expatriate community to Lamma Island. It is also popular with younger people and a haven for artists and musicians.

== Yung Shue Wan ==
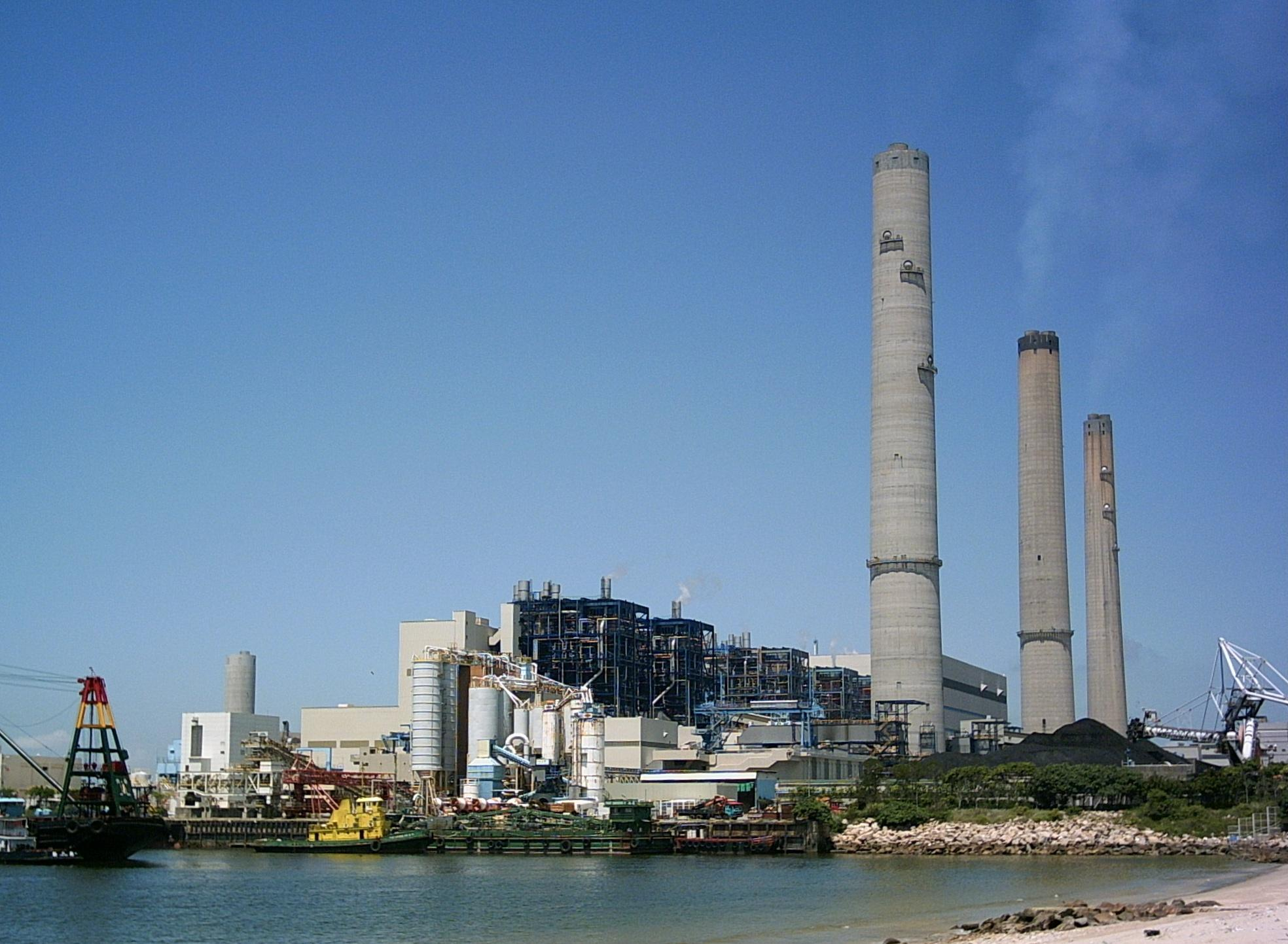
Hongkong Electric's Lamma Power Station

Yung Shue Wan (Banyan Bay) is the most populated area on Lamma Island. Several decades ago, it was the centre of the plastics industry. The factories have now been replaced by seafood restaurants, pubs, grocery stores and shops which sell oriental and Indian-style handicraft. Hung Shing Yeh Beach, Hongkong Electric's Lamma Power Station, North Lamma Island Public Library and Lamma Winds are also located in the northern part of the island.

== Sok Kwu Wan ==
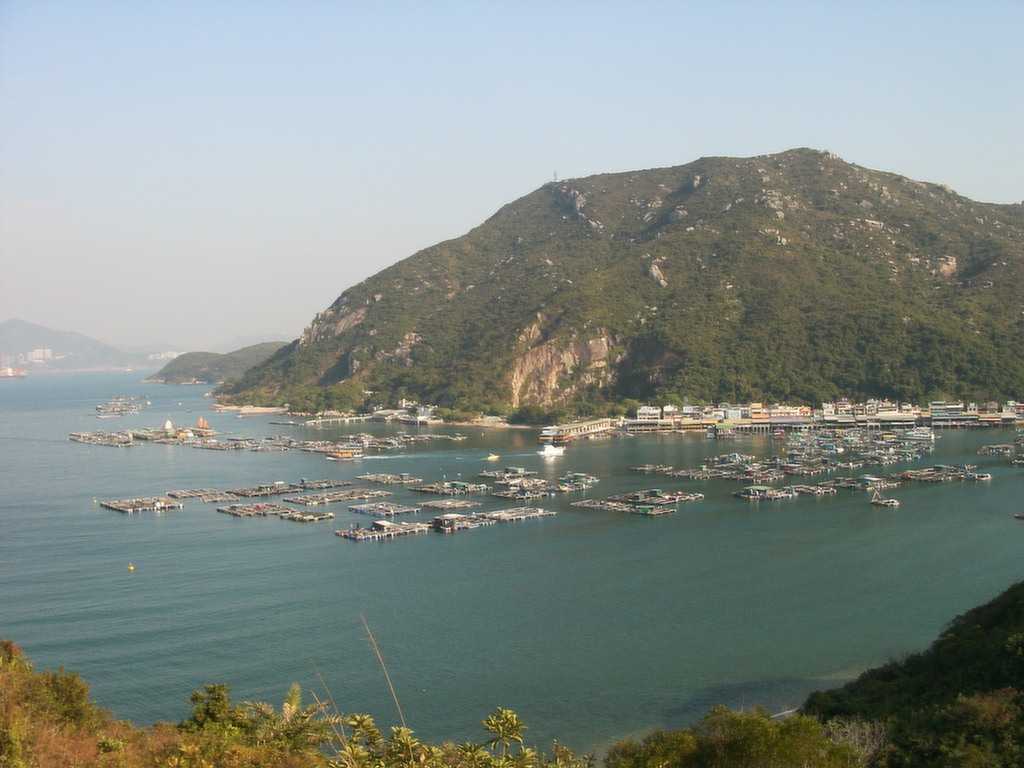
Overlooking the fish farms and restaurants at Sok Kwu Wan

Sok Kwu Wan consists mainly of seafood restaurants. Sok Kwu Wan has the largest fish farming site in Hong Kong.

Visitors can barbecue and fish at Lo So Shing Beach which is a ten-minute walk from the village. The trail between Yung Shue Wan and Sok Kwu Wan is surrounded by grassland and offers a picturesque walk offering views of the island's coastline. It takes roughly an hour to walk the trail.

Walkers may notice a few 'caves' on the trail near Sok Kwu Wan, labelled on tourist signs as 'kamikaze grottos'. These caves were dug out by the Japanese during the war, to store munitions alongside the suicide boats. When the British Navy reclaimed Hong Kong, they discovered rows of speedboats with explosives rigged to the bow in Sok Kwu Wan.

In addition to the caves, the Japanese also dug tunnels into the island's peaks, including two known tunnels on Ling Kok Shan and one on Mount Stenhouse.

== Sham Wan ==
Sham Wan is one of the five most important archaeological sites in Hong Kong. The bay is the site of an important Bronze Age settlement which was unearthed by archaeologists in the 1970s. It yielded evidence of people living on Lamma during the "Middle Neolithic" phase (c. 3800–3000 BC).

Historically, Sham Wan was also a place for green sea turtles to lay eggs. The endangered green turtles are a special group of marine organisms with distinctive navigation behaviour between their nesting, breeding, development and reproduction sites. As Sham Wan is the only existing nesting site for them in Hong Kong, every year there is a period of restricted access to it from 1 June to 31 October to allow the turtles to breed. The breeding site is about 5,100 m^{2} (54,896 sq ft). The last known nesting at Sham Wan was in 2012.

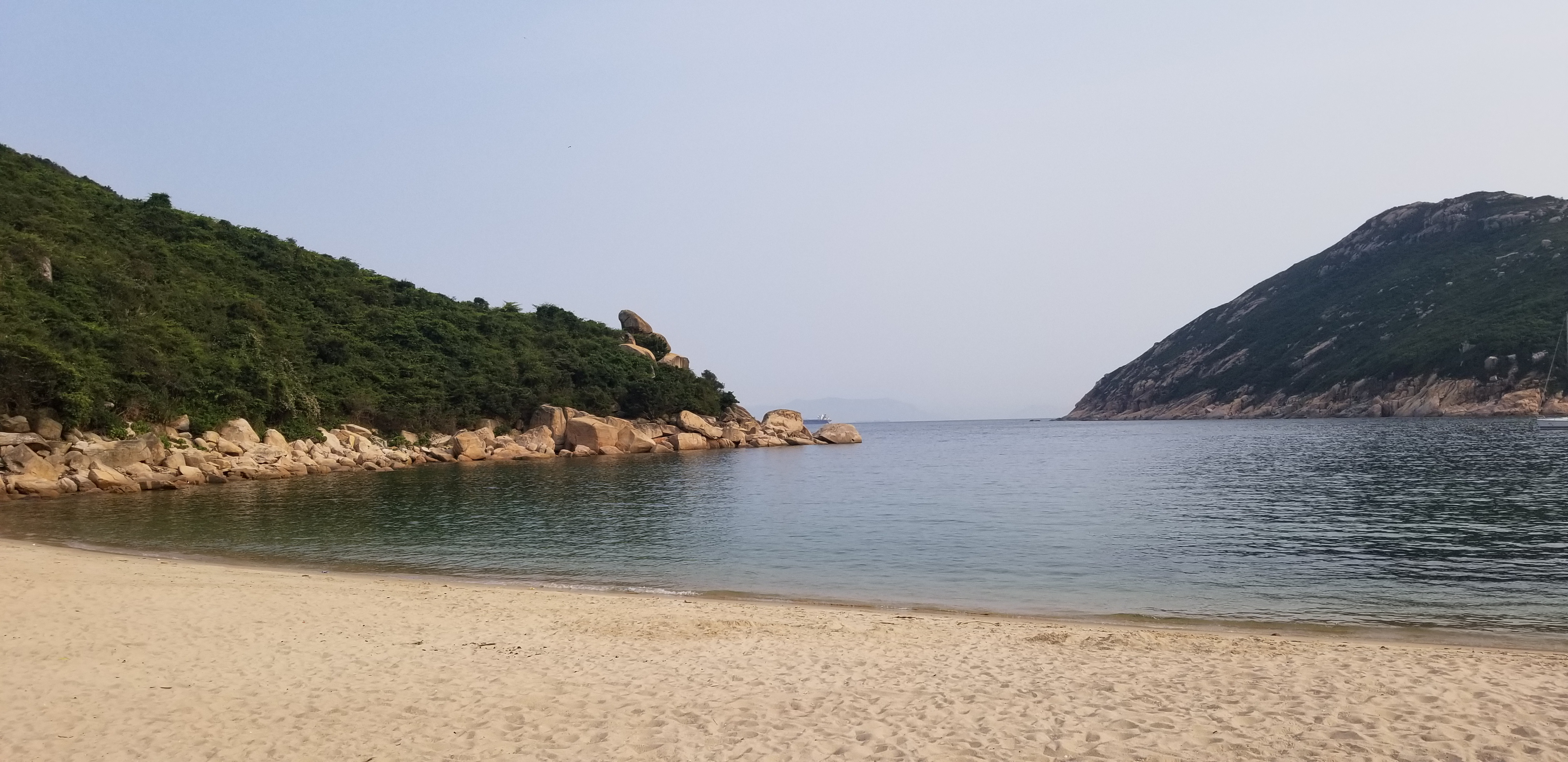
Sham Wan

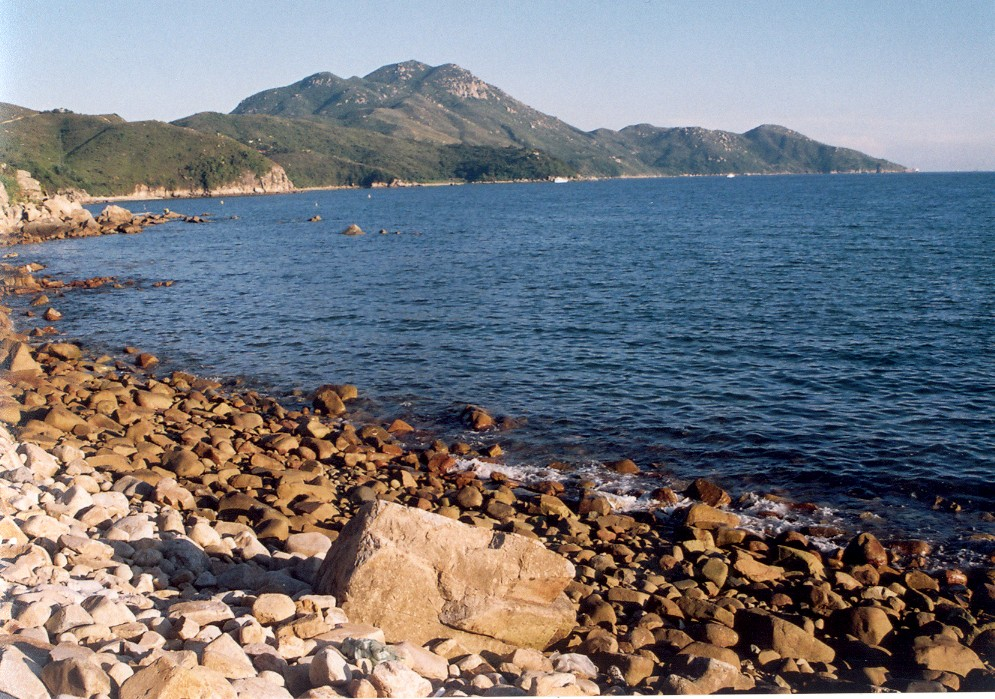
View of Mount Stenhouse

== Traditional festivals ==
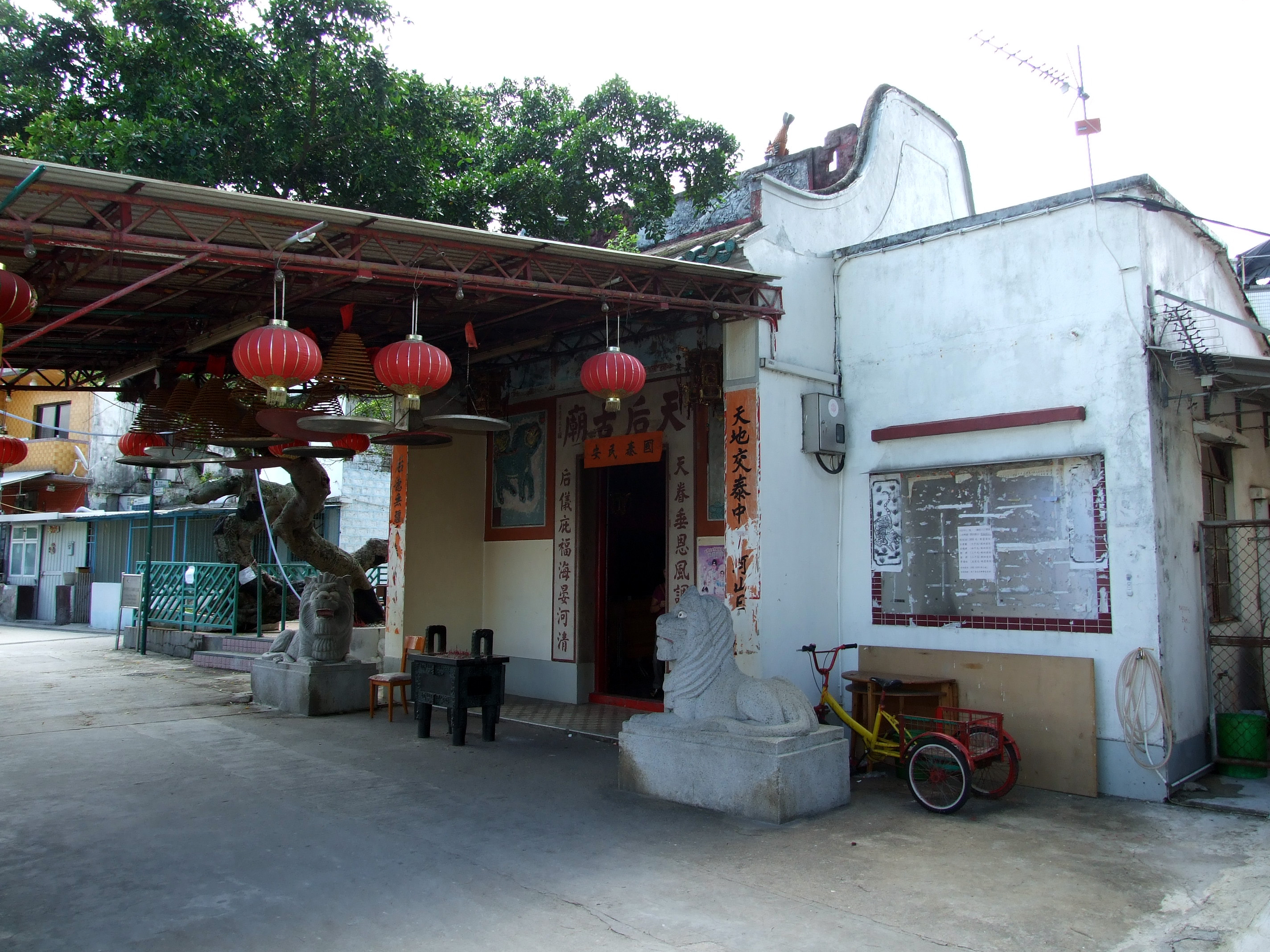
Tin Hau Temple in Yung Shue Wan.

Tin Hau temples are typical places of worship in Hong Kong's coastal communities because Tin Hau is believed to be the goddess of the sea and of fishermen, protecting them and ensuring full nets. There are three Tin Hau temples on Lamma, located in Yung Shue Wan, Sok Kwu Wan, and Luk Chau Village.

The Tin Hau Festival (twenty-third of the third month of the Lunar Calendar) is widely celebrated by the fishermen's communities in Lamma. Cantonese opera and floral paper offerings known as Fa Pau at both Sok Kwu Wan and Yung Shue Wan are the highlights of the celebration.

Lamma Island is also one of the few remaining places in Hong Kong where traditional Chinese New Year celebrations still take place: at the stroke of midnight, fireworks will be set off by the main families of the villages to frighten away the evil spirits, sending off a deafening thunder that can last up to 30 minutes.

== Transport ==
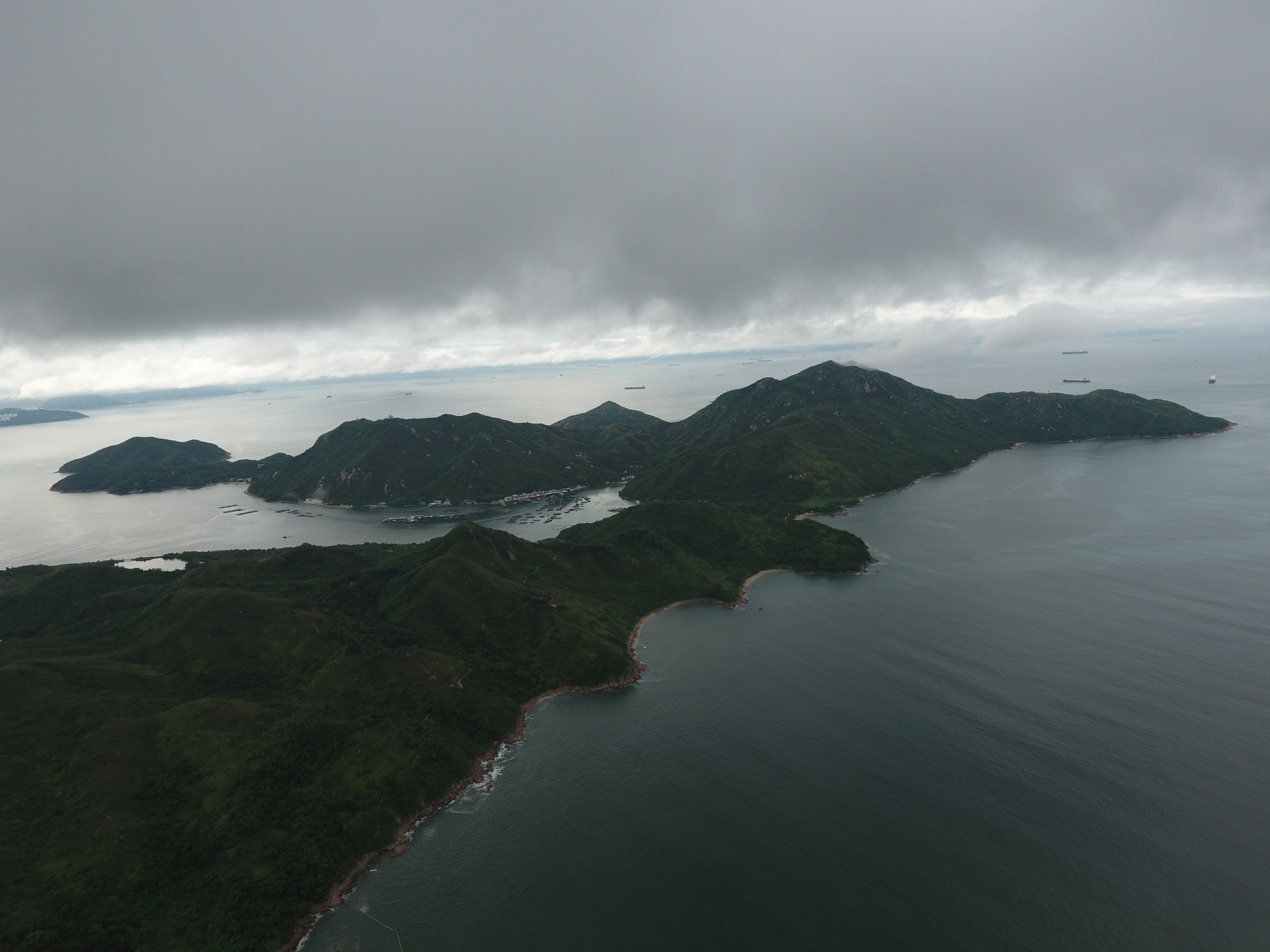
An aerial view of South Lamma

There are regular ferry services to Yung Shue Wan and Sok Kwu Wan from Central on Hong Kong Island, as well as to Yung Shue Wan via Pak Kok, and to Sok Kwu Wan via Mo Tat Wan, from Aberdeen. It takes about 25 minutes by ferry between Yung Shue Wan and Central. There are no cars on Lamma Island.

Two ferries collided off Yung Shue Wan on 1 October 2012 at 8:20 pm local time. With 39 killed and 92 injured, the incident was the deadliest maritime disaster in Hong Kong since 1971.

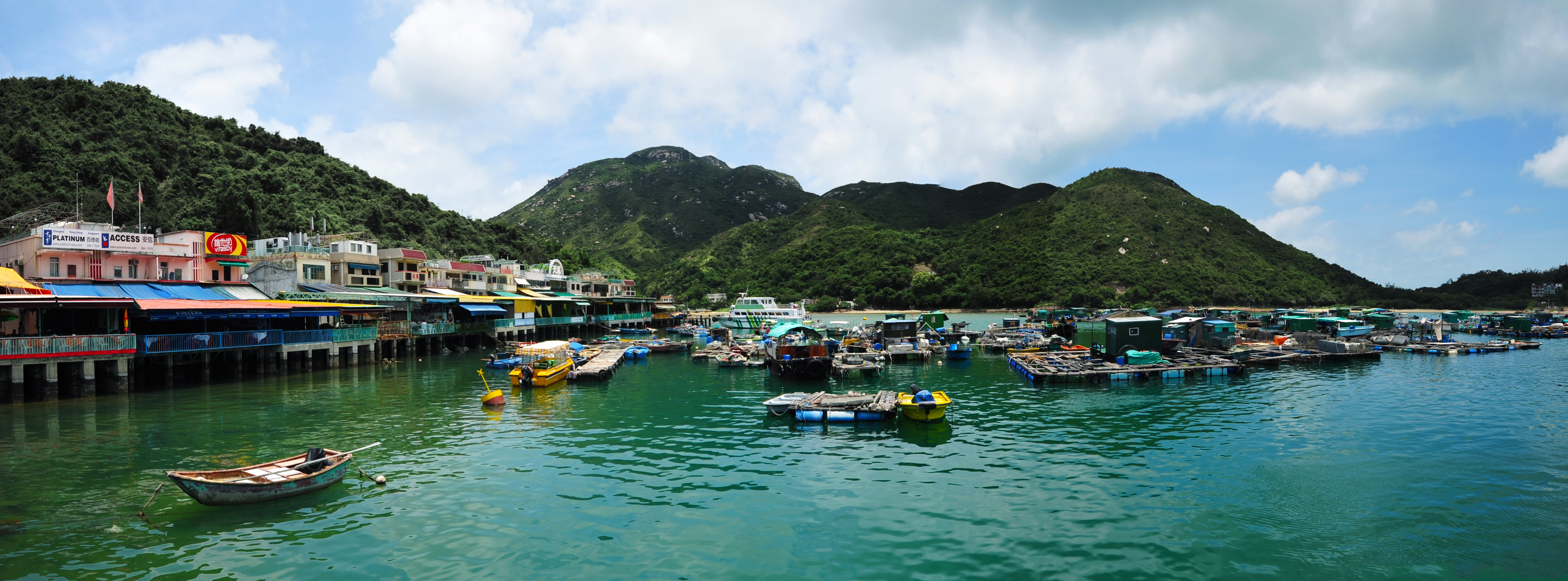
Sok Kwu Wan, Lamma Island

As the island is not connected by road to the rest of Hong Kong, the only vehicles on the island are those used by the emergency services, and village vehicles, which are used to transport goods. The main method of getting around the island is on foot or by bicycle.

== Education ==
Lamma Island is in Primary One Admission (POA) School Net 96, which contains a single aided school, Northern Lamma School; no government primary schools are in this net.

The Hong Kong Public Libraries operates two libraries on Lamma Island: North Lamma Public Library at Yung Shue Wan, and South Lamma Public Library at Sok Kwu Wan.

== Law enforcement ==
The Hong Kong Police Force operates two police posts on Lamma Island: Lamma Island Police Post at Yung Shue Wan and Sok Kwu Wan Police Post at Sok Kwu Wan.

== Notable residents ==
- Chow Yun-fat, actor; born and raised on Lamma Island
- John D. Romer, a British veteran, discovered a new species of frog, Romer's tree frog (Liuixalus romeri), an endangered species, in a cave in 1952.
- Marli Siu, Scottish actress
- Harry Harrison, Political Cartoonist

== See also ==
- List of buildings, sites and areas in Hong Kong
- Skyluck
- Stone circles (Hong Kong)
- Tai Peng
- Harry Harrison (cartoonist)
