= List of places in Hong Kong =

The following is a list of areas of Hong Kong.

== Hong Kong Island ==
- Central and Western District
  - Central District
    - Admiralty
  - Mid-Levels
    - Soho
  - Sai Wan
    - Kennedy Town
    - Sai Ying Pun
    - Shek Tong Tsui
  - Sheung Wan
- Eastern District
  - Chai Wan
    - Heng Fa Chuen
    - Siu Sai Wan
  - North Point
    - Braemar Hill
    - Fortress Hill
    - North Point Mid-Levels
  - Quarry Bay
    - Kornhill
    - Taikoo Shing
  - Sai Wan Ho
  - Shau Kei Wan
    - Aldrich Bay
    - A Kung Ngam
- Southern District
  - Aberdeen
  - Ap Lei Chau
  - Chung Hom Kok
  - Siu Sai Wan
  - Cyberport
    - Telegraph Bay
  - Deep Water Bay
  - Pok Fu Lam
    - Sandy Bay
    - Wah Fu
  - Tin Wan
  - Repulse Bay
  - Stanley
  - Shek O
    - Big Wave Bay
  - Tai Tam
  - Wah Fu
    - Waterfall Bay
  - Wong Chuk Hang
    - Nam Long Shan
    - Ocean Park
  - Victoria Peak
- Wan Chai District
  - Causeway Bay
    - Tin Hau
    - Caroline Hill
  - Happy Valley
    - Jardine's Lookout
  - Tai Hang
  - Wan Chai

== Kowloon ==
- Sham Shui Po District
  - Cheung Sha Wan
  - Lai Chi Kok
    - Mei Foo Sun Chuen
  - Sham Shui Po
    - Nam Cheong Estate
  - Shek Kip Mei
  - Stonecutters Island
  - Yau Yat Chuen
- Yau Tsim Mong District
  - Hung Hom
  - King's Park
  - Jordan
  - Kwun Chung
  - Mong Kok
    - Prince Edward
  - Tai Kok Tsui
  - Tsim Sha Tsui
    - Tsim Sha Tsui East
  - Yau Ma Tei
- Kowloon City District
  - Ho Man Tin
  - Hung Hom
    - Whampoa Garden
  - Kai Tak
  - Kowloon City
  - Kowloon Tong
  - Kowloon Tsai
  - Ma Tau Kok
  - Ma Tau Wai
  - To Kwa Wan
- Wong Tai Sin District
  - Diamond Hill
  - Kowloon Peak (Fei Ngo Shan)
  - Choi Hung
    - Choi Hung Estate
    - Choi Wan Estate
    - Fu Shan Estate
  - San Po Kong
  - Tsz Wan Shan
  - Wang Tau Hom
    - Lok Fu Estate
  - Wong Tai Sin (Chuk Un)
    - Tung Tau Estate
- Kwun Tong District
  - Cha Kwo Ling
  - Kwun Tong
    - Yuet Wah
  - Lam Tin
  - Lei Yue Mun
  - Ngau Tau Kok
  - Ngau Chi Wan
    - Ping Shek Estate
    - Shun Chi Court
    - Shun Lee Estate
    - Shun On Estate
    - Shun Tin Estate
    - Jordan Valley
  - Kowloon Bay
    - Amoy Gardens
  - Sau Mau Ping
  - Yau Tong

== New Territories ==
- Tsuen Wan District
  - Lantau Island, Tsuen Wan
    - Penny's Bay
      - Hong Kong Disneyland
    - Yam O
  - Lo Wai
  - Ma Wan
  - Sham Tseng
    - Tsing Lung Tau
  - Ting Kau
  - Tsuen Wan
    - Chung On Street
- North District
  - Frontier Closed Area
    - Sha Tau Kok
    - Shenzhen East
      - Lo Wu
      - Man Kam To
  - Fanling
  - Kwan Tei
  - Kwu Tung
  - Lin Ma Hang
  - Ping Che
  - Sheung Shui
  - Ta Kwu Ling
- Sai Kung District
  - Clear Water Bay
    - Hang Hau Village
    - Mang Kung Uk
    - Pik Uk
    - Po Toi O
    - Shui Bin Tsuen
    - Ta Ku Ling
    - Tai Au Mun
    - Tai Po Tsai
    - Tseng Lan Shue
  - Kau Sai Chau
  - Kiu Tsui Chau
  - Pak Sha Chau
  - Sai Kung Town
  - Ho Chung
  - Leung Shuen Wan
  - Marina Cove
  - Tui Min Hoi
  - Yim Tin Tsai
  - Tseung Kwan O New Town
    - Tseung Kwan O
    - Hang Hau
    - LOHAS Park
    - Po Lam
    - Tiu Keng Leng / Rennie's Mill
  - Tseung Kwan O Industrial Estate
    - Junk Island
  - Tung Lung Chau
    - Yueng Chau
- Sha Tin District
  - Fo Tan
  - Kau To Shan
  - Ma Liu Shui
    - Chinese University of Hong Kong
  - Ma On Shan
    - Heng On Estate
    - Tai Shui Hang
    - Wu Kai Sha
  - Pak Shek Kok (Reclaimed Part)
    - Science Park
  - Sha Tin
    - Che Kung Miu
    - City One Shatin
    - Hin Keng Estate
    - Sha Tin Wai
    - Shek Mun Industrial Estate
    - Siu Lek Yuen
    - Tai Wai
    - Yuen Chau Kok
- Tai Po District
  - Hoi Ha Wan
  - Hong Lok Yuen
  - Lam Tsuen
  - Pak Shek Kok
    - Science Park
  - Pat Sin Leng
  - Tung Ping Chau
  - Plover Cove
  - Shap Sze Heung
    - Kei Ling Ha Lo Wai
    - Nai Chung
  - Tai Po
    - Tai Wo Estate
    - Tai Po Industrial Estate
  - Tai Po Kau
  - Ting Kok
    - Tung Tsz
- Kwai Tsing District
  - Kwai Chung
    - Kwai Fong Estate
    - Kwai Hing Estate
    - Lai King
    - Tai Wo Hau Estate
  - Tsing Yi
- Tuen Mun District
  - Lung Kwu Tan
  - Tuen Mun (Tuen Mun New Town)
    - Fu Tei
    - San Hui
    - So Kwun Wat
      - Gold Coast
  - Siu Lam
  - Tai Lam Chung
- Yuen Long District
  - Frontier Closed Area
    - Shenzhen West
      - Lok Ma Chau
        - Huanggang
    - Mai Po
  - Kam Tin
    - Pat Heung
    - Shek Kong
  - San Tin
  - Tin Shui Wai
  - Yuen Long
    - Au Tau
    - Ha Tsuen
    - Lau Fau Shan
    - Ping Shan
    - Shap Pat Heung
    - Tai Tong
    - Yuen Long Town
      - Long Ping Estate
      - Yuen Long San Hui
- Islands District
  - Chek Lap Kok
  - Cheung Chau
  - Hei Ling Chau
  - Kau Yi Chau
  - Lamma Island
    - Hung Shing Yeh
    - Lo So Shing
    - Mo Tat
    - Pak Kok
    - Sham Wan
    - Sok Kwu Wan
    - Tung O
    - Yung Shue Ha
    - Yung Shue Wan
  - Lantau Island (Excluding Northeastern Part)
    - Discovery Bay
    - Cheung Sha
    - Chi Ma Wan
    - Fan Lau
    - Man Cheung Po (萬丈布)
    - Mui Wo
    - Ngong Ping
    - Pui O
    - San Shek Wan (䃟石灣)
    - Shek Pik
    - Shui Hau
    - Siu Ho Wan
    - Tai Ho Wan
    - Tai O
    - Tong Fuk
    - Tung Chung
    - Yi O (二澳)
  - Peng Chau
  - Po Toi Islands
  - Shek Kwu Chau
  - Soko Islands

== See also ==
- Geography of Hong Kong
- Transport in Hong Kong
- Tourism in Hong Kong
- Lists of places and features in Hong Kong
  - List of cities and towns in Hong Kong
  - Villages
    - Walled villages
  - Buildings and structures
    - Declared monuments
    - Museums
    - Hospitals
    - Tunnels and bridges
  - Streets and roads
    - Tunnels and bridges
  - Bays
    - Beaches
  - Peaks, mountains and hills
  - Islands and peninsulas
  - Harbours
  - Channels
  - Rivers
  - Urban public parks and gardens
