= Cheung Sha Beach =

Cheung Sha Beach (Chinese: 長沙泳灘) may refer to the following beaches in Cheung Sha, Hong Kong:

- Lower Cheung Sha Beach
- Upper Cheung Sha Beach
