= Beaches of Hong Kong =

Hong Kong has a long and jagged coastline with many bays and beaches. The shelter provided by adjacent mountains keeps wave sizes generally small, and most beaches are thus suitable for swimming and recreation, if they can be reached.

About half of Hong Kong's more accessible beaches are gazetted and thus managed by the Leisure and Cultural Services Department (LCSD). Many that are not gazetted are also popular, and some privately owned beaches are publicly accessible.

With the increasing development and urbanisation of Hong Kong, water quality has worsened resulting in the closure of several beaches previously suitable for swimming. These include Approach Beach, Ting Kau Beach, Anglers' Beach, Gemini Beaches, Hoi Mei Wan Beach, Casam Beach and Lido Beach in Tsuen Wan. In 2011, Lido Beach, Casam Beach, Approach Beach and Hoi Mei Wan Beach were reopened following an improvement in water quality.

== Gazetted beaches ==
A total of forty-two beaches in Hong Kong are gazetted and managed by LCSD. Twelve of these are located on Hong Kong Island, with the remaining 30 spread across the New Territories, including the Outlying Islands. Some are temporarily closed to swimmers.

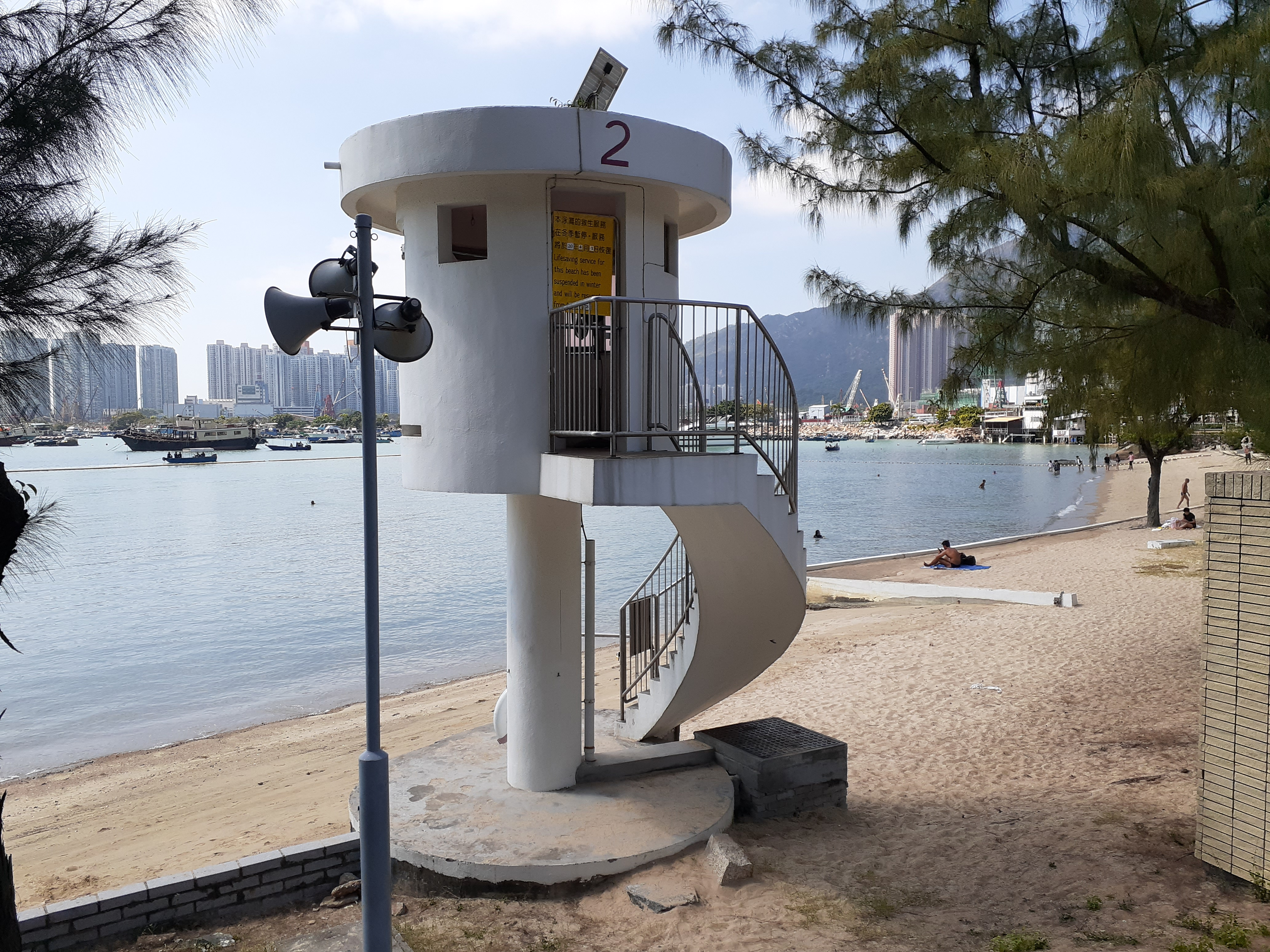
Lifeguard tower at Castle Peak Beach.

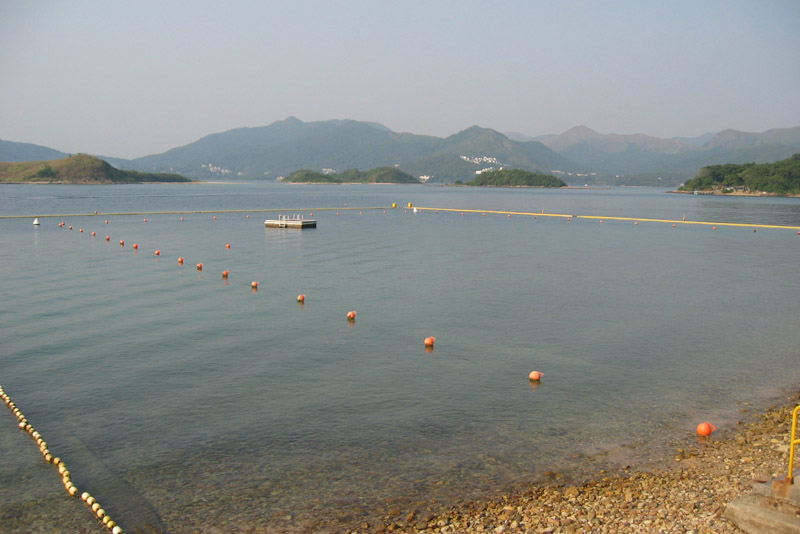
Shark net at Kiu Tsui Beach.

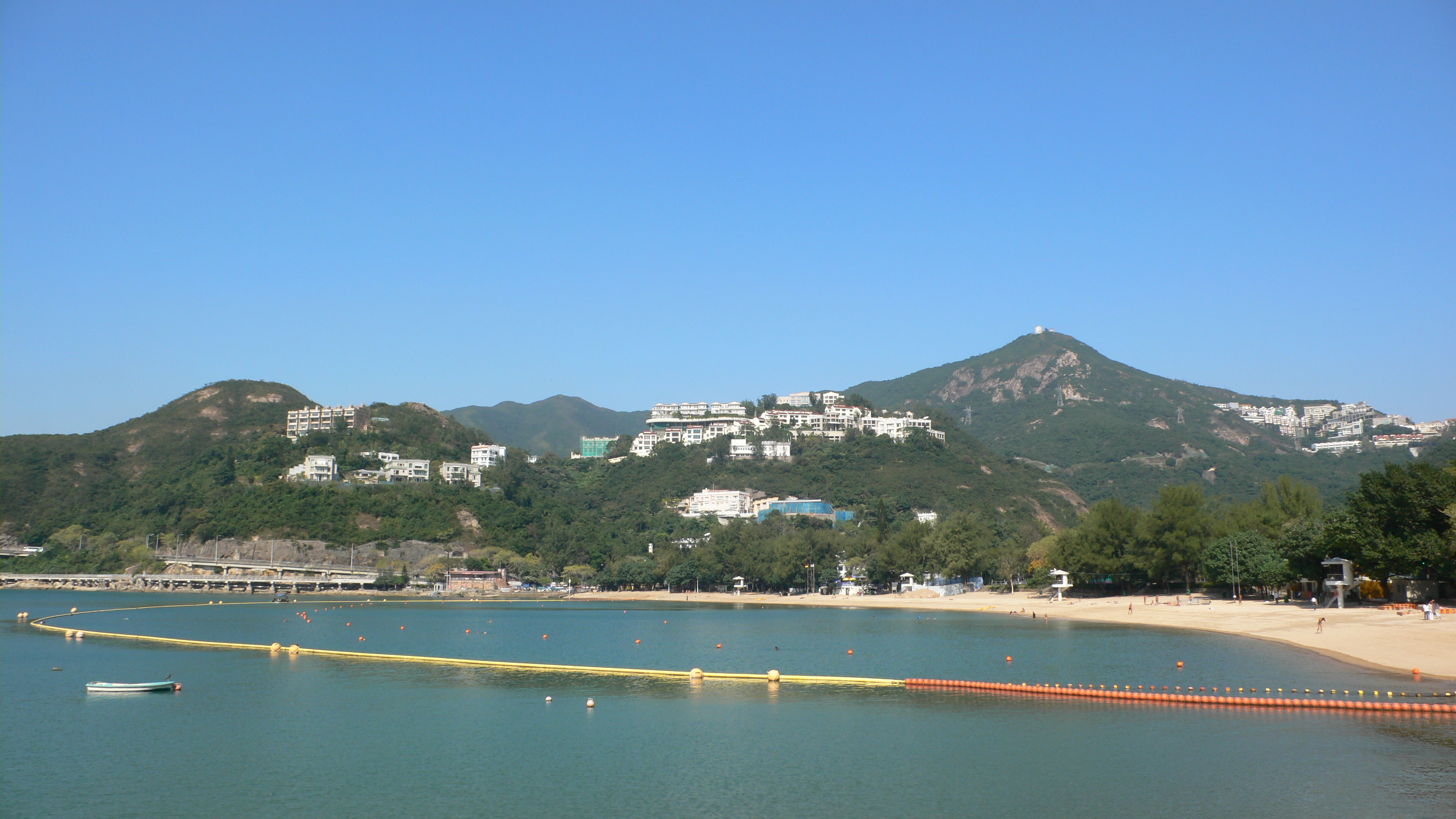
Shark net at Deep Water Bay Beach.

=== Full list ===
Tuen Mun District

1. Butterfly Beach (蝴蝶灣泳灘)
2. Castle Peak Beach (青山灣泳灘)
3. Kadoorie Beach (加多利灣泳灘)
4. Cafeteria Old Beach (舊咖啡灣泳灘)
5. Cafeteria New Beach (新咖啡灣泳灘)
6. Golden Beach (黃金泳灘)

Tsuen Wan District

7. Anglers' Beach (釣魚灣泳灘)
8. Gemini Beaches (雙仙灣泳灘)
9. Hoi Mei Wan Beach (海美灣泳灘)
10. Casam Beach (更生灣泳灘)
11. Lido Beach (麗都灣泳灘)
12. Ting Kau Beach (汀九灣泳灘)
13. Approach Beach (近水灣泳灘)
14. Ma Wan Tung Wan Beach (馬灣東灣泳灘)

Sai Kung District

15. Trio Beach (三星灣泳灘)
16. Kiu Tsui Beach (橋咀泳灘)
17. Hap Mun Bay Beach (廈門灣泳灘)
18. Silverstrand Beach (銀線灣泳灘)
19. Clear Water Bay First Beach (清水灣第一灣泳灘)
20. Clear Water Bay Second Beach (清水灣第二灣泳灘)

Hong Kong Island

21. Deep Water Bay Beach (深水灣泳灘)
22. Repulse Bay Beach (淺水灣泳灘)
23. Middle Bay Beach (中灣泳灘)
24. South Bay, Hong Kong (南灣泳灘)
25. Chung Hom Kok Beach (舂坎角泳灘)
26. St. Stephen's Beach (聖士提反灣泳灘)
27. Stanley Main Beach (赤柱正灘泳灘)
28. Hairpin Beach (夏萍灣泳灘)
29. Turtle Cove Beach (龜背灣泳灘)
30. Shek O Beach (石澳泳灘)
31. Rocky Bay Beach (石澳後灘泳灘)
32. Big Wave Bay Beach (大浪灣泳灘)

Lamma Island

33. Hung Shing Yeh Beach (洪聖爺灣泳灘)
34. Lo So Shing Beach (蘆鬚城泳灘)

Cheung Chau

35. Kwun Yam Beach (觀音灣泳灘)
36. Cheung Chau Tung Wan Beach (長洲東灣泳灘)

Lantau Island

37. Silver Mine Bay Beach (銀鑛灣泳灘)
38. Pui O Beach (貝澳泳灘)
39. Upper Cheung Sha Beach (上長沙泳灘)
40. Lower Cheung Sha Beach (下長沙泳灘)
41. Tong Fuk Beach (塘福泳灘)

Tai Po District

42. Tai Po Lung Mei Beach (大埔龍尾泳灘)

=== Tuen Mun ===
==== Kadoorie Beach ====
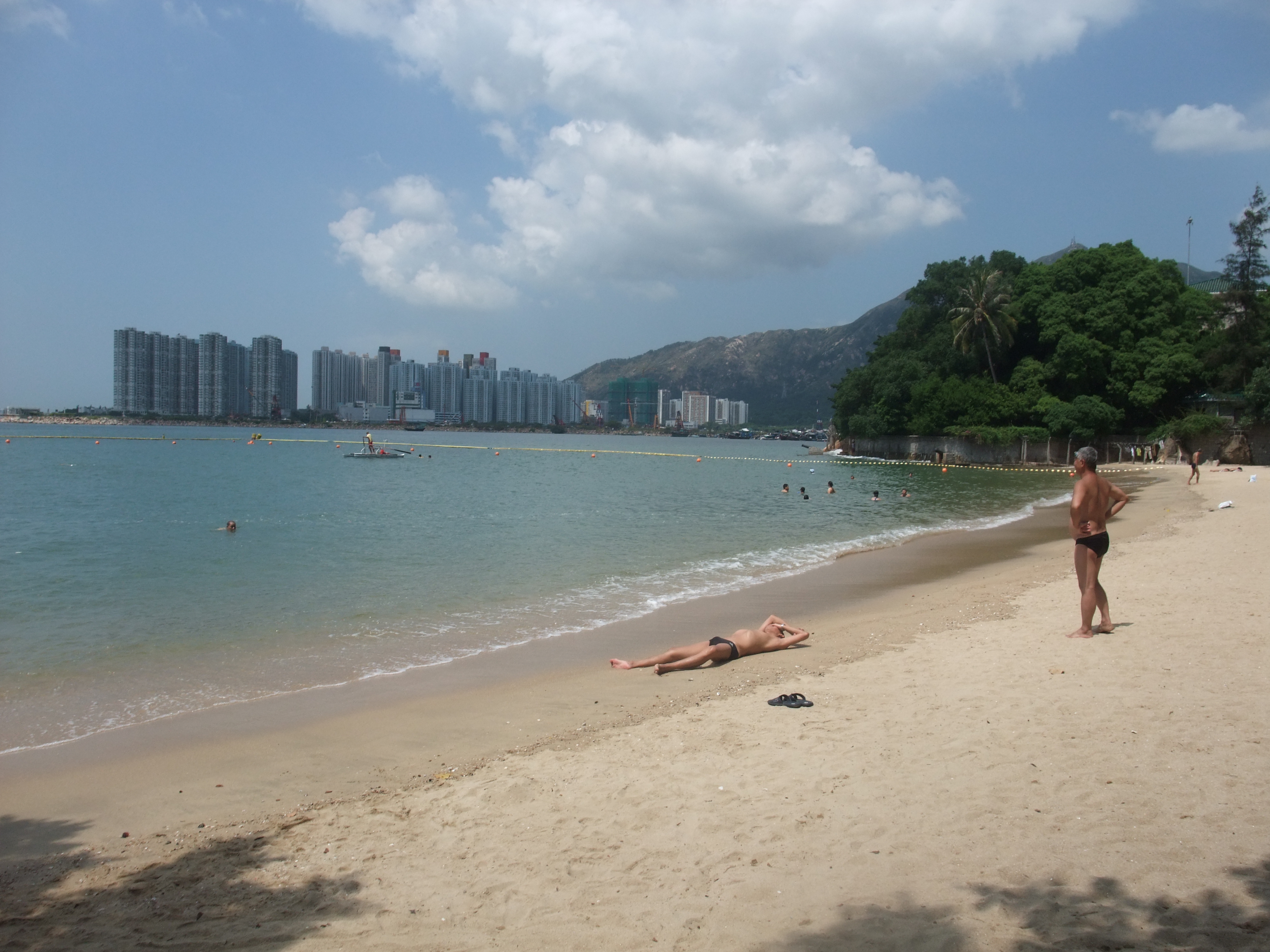
Kadoorie Beach

Kadoorie Beach (加多利灣泳灘) is located at 18¾ milestone, Castle Peak Road. The enquires of the beach are 2450 6336 and 2451 3461. There are BBQ area, changing rooms, shower facilities and toilet. Lifeguard service hours are 0900–1800 in April to May, September to October, and also on Mondays to Fridays in June to August. On Saturdays, Sundays and public holidays in June to August, lifeguard service hours are 0800–1900. Lifeguard services are suspended during winter (November to March).

==== Cafeteria Old Beach ====
Cafeteria Old Beach (舊咖啡灣泳灘) is located at 18¾ milestone, Castle Peak Road. The enquires of the beach are 2450 6306 and 2451 3461. There are refreshment kiosk, BBQ area, changing room, shower facilities, toilet and bathing shed. Lifeguard service hours are 0900–1800 in April to May, September to October, and also on Mondays to Fridays in June to August. On Saturdays, Sundays and public holidays in June to August, lifeguard service hours are 0800–1900. Lifeguard services are suspended during winter (November to March).

==== Cafeteria New Beach ====
Cafeteria New Beach (新咖啡灣泳灘) is located at 18½ milestone, Castle Peak Road. The enquires of the beach are 2450 6440 and 2451 3461. There are refreshment kiosk and beach volleyball court. Lifeguard service hours are 0900–1800 in April to May, September to October, and also on Mondays to Fridays in June to August. On Saturdays, Sundays and public holidays in June to August, lifeguard service hours are 0800–1900. Lifeguard services are suspended during winter (November to March).

==== Golden Beach ====
Golden Beach (黃金泳灘) is located at the 18½ milestone of Castle Peak Road, Tuen Mun. It is the largest beach in Tuen Mun with a total area of 78,500 m^{2} and a length of 545 metres. It is the first artificial beach in Hong Kong. It is classified as a Grade 2 beach, meaning that the water quality is fair. Refreshment kiosks, a hotel and a shopping mall are to be found adjacent to the beach.

Golden Beach is unique amongst the beaches of Hong Kong in that it has a volleyball court. The Hong Kong Beach Volleyball Team occasionally practises on Golden Beach.

Golden Beach is served by KMB bus routes 52X (Tuen Mun Central ↔ Mong Kok), 53 (Yuen Long station ↔ Tsuen Wan), 61A (Yau Oi South → Tuen Mun Road Interchange), 61M (Yau Oi South ↔ Lai King North), 252B (Handsome Court → Tsim Sha Tsui), 252X (Handsome Court/Chi Lok Fa Yuen ↔ Lam Tin station) and 261B (Sam Shing → Kowloon station);
by Citybus bus routes 962/N962 (Lung Mun Oasis ↔ Causeway Bay), 962B/962S (Chi Lok Fa Yuen ↔ Causeway Bay);
by Long Win Bus bus routes A33 (Airport ↔ Tuen Mun Road Interchange);

by MTR Bus feeder bus routes K51 (Fu Tai ↔ Tai Lam) and K53 (Tuen Mun station ↺ So Kwun Wat).

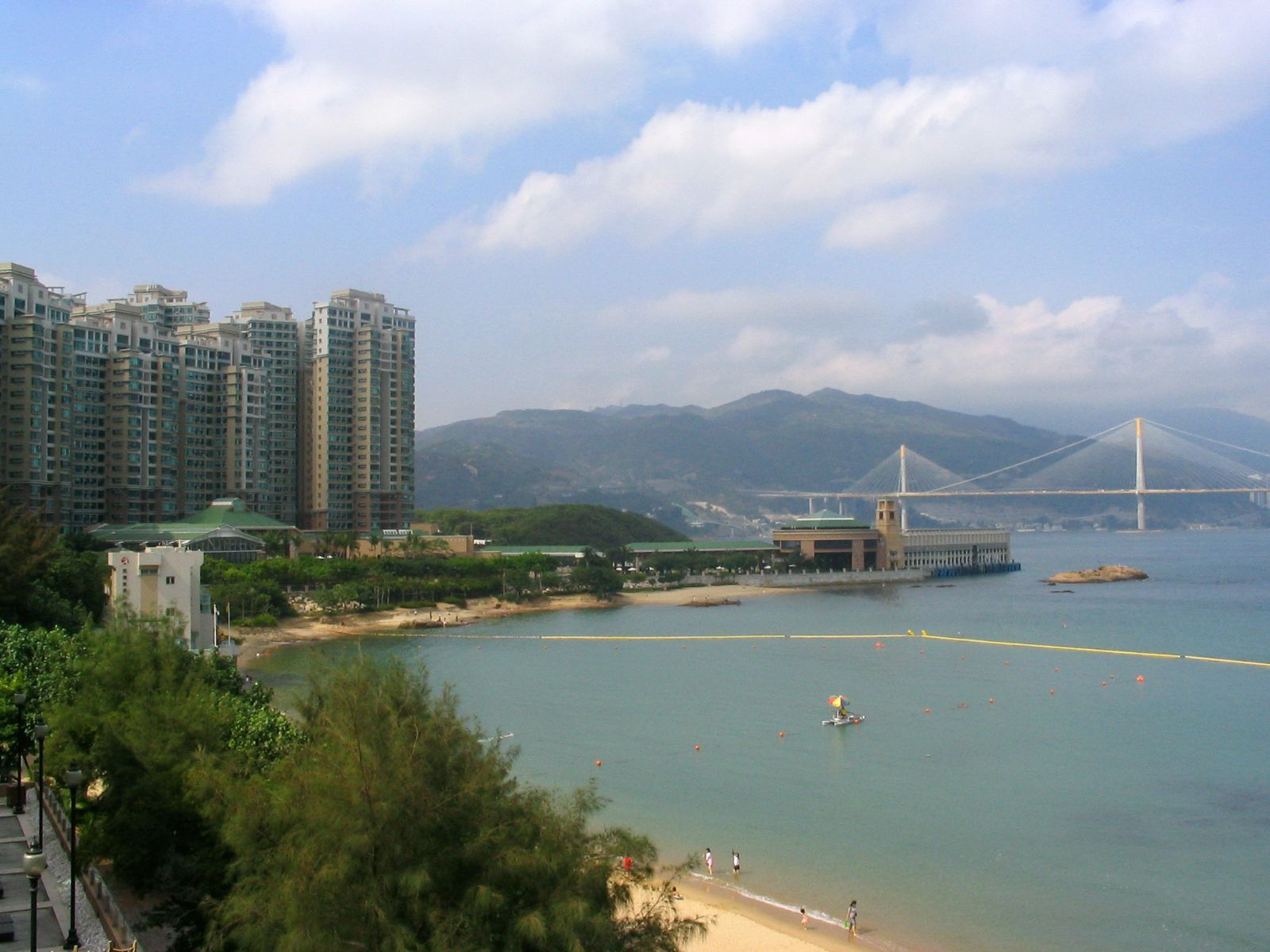
Ma Wan Tung Wan Beach

=== Tsuen Wan ===
==== Ma Wan Tung Wan Beach – Ma Wan ====
Ma Wan Tung Wan Beach (馬灣東灣泳灘) is located on Ma Wan island.

=== Hong Kong Island ===
==== Deep Water Bay Beach ====
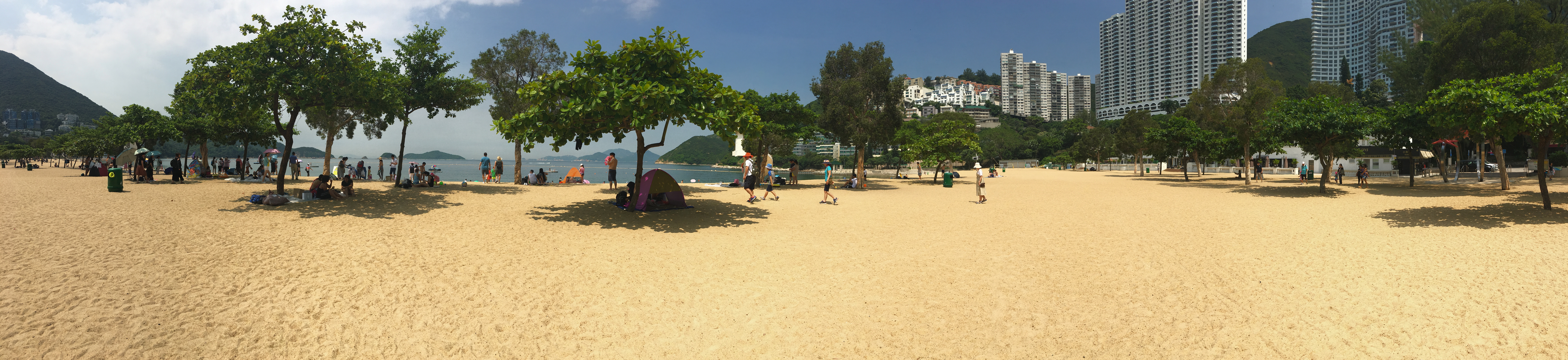
A Panorama of Repulse Bay Beach looking southwest

Deep Water Bay Beach (深水灣泳灘) is located on southern Hong Kong Island. See Deep Water Bay Beach.

==== Repulse Bay Beach ====
Repulse Bay Beach (淺水灣泳灘), traditionally Hong Kong's most popular because of its easy access by bus and extensive facilities, is located on southern Hong Kong Island. See Repulse Bay Beach.

==== Middle Bay Beach and South Bay Beach ====
These two small beaches at South Bay and Middle Bay are located within walking distance of Repulse Bay Beach. However, since they are not directly accessible by public transport, they tend to be quieter and less crowded than Repulse Bay.

==== Turtle Cove Beach ====
The beach situated east of Stanley and west of Tai Tam Reservoir is Turtle Cove Beach (龜背灣泳灘) which is a Grade 1 beach of less than 70 meters in length. Turtle Cove is very well equipped; with changing rooms, toilets and showers as well as a small playground, a soft drinks kiosk and seven barbecue pits.

Turtle Cove Beach is accessible by bus No.14 from exit A of the Sai Wan Ho MTR station or mini-bus 16X from Chai Wan; the beach is located near the Red Hill estate stop (past the Tai Tam Reservoir). From near the bus stop, stairs lead down the hill to the beach.

==== Big Wave Bay Beach ====
Big Wave Bay Beach (大浪灣泳灘) in Southern District is also the site of prehistoric rock carvings similar to those found on Cheung Chau Island. Not to be confused with other places called Big Wave Bay or Tai Long Wan in Hong Kong.

=== Lamma Island ===
==== Hung Shing Yeh Beach ====
Hung Shing Yeh Beach (洪聖爺灣泳灘) is the most popular beach on Lamma Island. The sand on the beach is very fine, like powder. The water of the Beach is clean and it is classified as a Grade 1 beach.

Near the beach, there is a barbecue area, refreshment kiosk, and shower and changing facilities.

There is no public transport on Lamma Island. To reach the beach one must travel to Yung Shue Wan from Central by ferry, and then walk for about 20 minutes. The route is signposted.

==== Lo So Shing Beach ====
Lo So Shing Beach (蘆鬚城泳灘) is located on Lamma Island between the main villages of Yung Shue Wan and Sok Kwu Wan. The water of the beach is clean and it is classified as a Grade 1 beach. Some years ago the government of Hong Kong built shower and refreshment facilities there, which remain almost unused because of the beach's remote location and the absence of public transport.

To reach the beach one must travel to Yung Shue Wan or Sok Kwu Wan by ferry, and then walk for about 40 minutes.

=== Cheung Chau ===
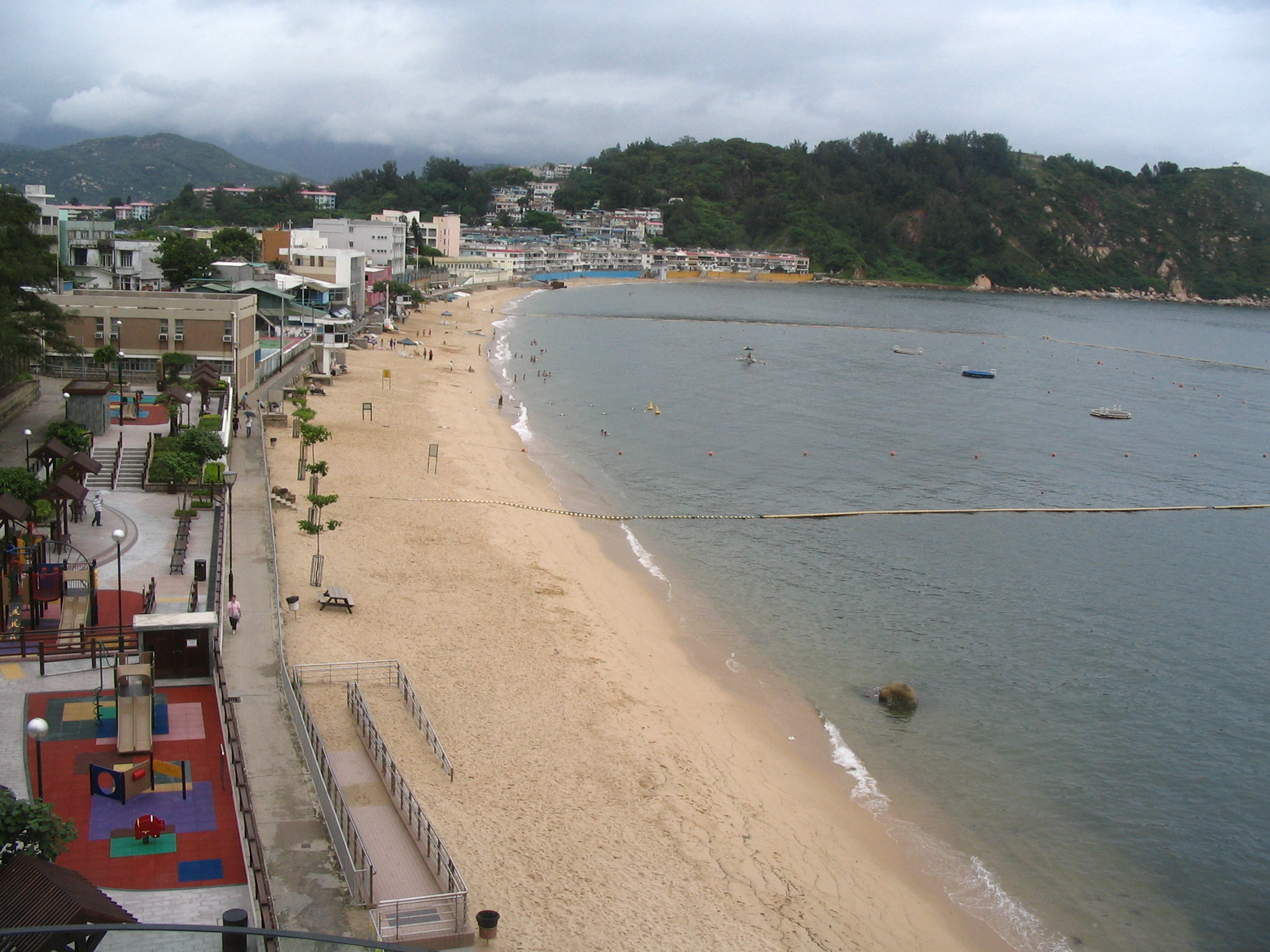
Cheung Chau Tung Wan Beach

There are two main beaches on Cheung Chau: Cheung Chau Tung Wan Beach (長洲東灣泳灘) and Kwun Yam Beach (觀音灣). Cheung Chau Tun Wan Beach and Kwun Yam Beach are 230 and 100 metre-long gazetted beaches on the east coast of Cheung Chau with Grade 1 water quality as classified by the Environmental Protection Department. The beaches have access to windsurfing, standup paddleboard, and kayak rentals. Cheung Chau is where Hong Kong's first Olympic medalist, Lee Lai Shan, first learned and practised windsurfing. In 1975, a café and windsurfing centre was opened by her uncle and first coach, Lai Gun, between the two beaches.

=== Lantau Island ===
==== Silver Mine Bay Beach ====
Silver Mine Bay Beach

Hong Kong's largest island, Lantau, has several clean, accessible beaches. The first step to reaching theses beaches is taking the ferry from Central to Mui Wo. The beaches of Lantau can be accessed by bus.

Silver Mine Bay Beach (銀鑛灣泳灘), which is a Grade 1 beach, is the easiest one to get to, since it is located about a 5-minute walk away from the Mui Wo ferry pier. Since there is a sandbar area, this beach is ideal for flinging frisbees or flying kites. Further along the beach is a swimming area with several lifeguards on duty. Many visitors rent a bike for the afternoon, and stop off at the many refreshment kiosks and little restaurants along the road fronting the beach. If people do not feel like hurrying back into the city, they can also choose to stay overnight at the Silvermine Beach Hotel, located right on the waterfront. Also, there are several other hotels and guesthouses in the area where people can stay.

==== Cheung Sha Beaches ====
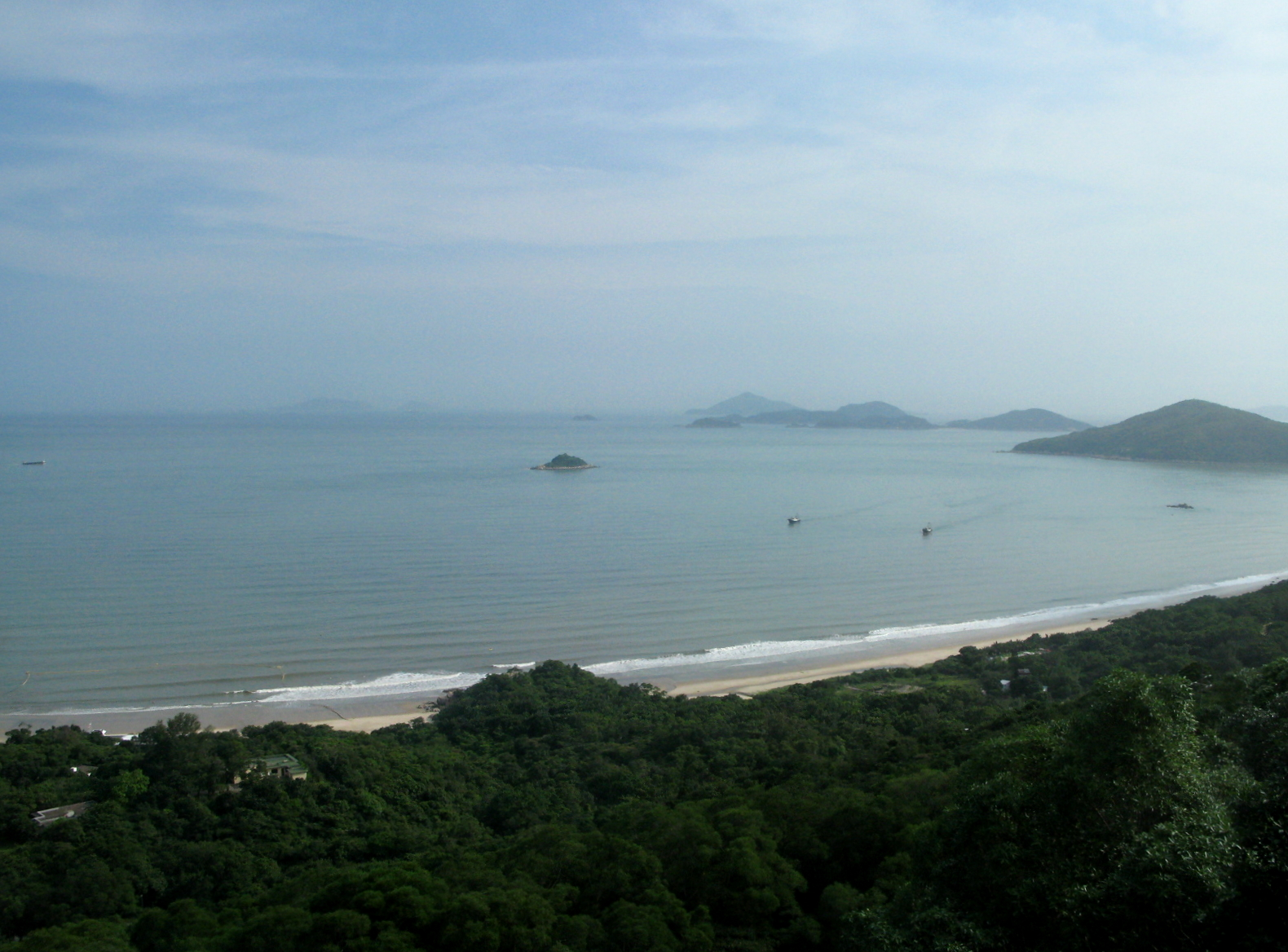
View over Lower Cheung Sha Beach. The islet in the middle of the bay is Cha Kwo Chau (茶果洲).

Cheung Sha Beach is located in Cheung Sha, on the southern shore of Lantau Island. It is divided into two parts by a small headland: Upper Cheung Sha Beach (east) and Lower Cheung Sha Beach (west). It is 3 km long and is one of the longest beaches in Hong Kong. The beaches are accessible from South Lantau Road. Tong Fuk Beach is located nearby, to the west of Lower Cheung Sha Beach.

== Non-gazetted beaches ==
A number of Hong Kong's larger non-gazetted beaches are popular, with the lack of official oversight and facilities often seen as part of their attraction. Other, smaller locations may be difficult to reach and likely exclusive for any visitor that finds them. However such non-maintained beaches may have accumulated significant flotsam and jetsam of varying attractiveness. A few bays, such as Hoi Ha, lie within protected areas and swimming may be prohibited.

1. Chung Wan (涌灣) South Crooked Harbour, North District
2. Cheung Sha Wan (長沙灣) Northeast Ping Chau
3. Crescent Bay (娥眉灣) Crescent Island, Mirs Bay
4. Lo Kei Wan (籮箕灣) Crescent Island, Mirs Bay
5. Tung Wan (東灣) Wong Wan Chau, Mirs Bay
6. Wu Kai Sha (烏溪沙) Wu Kai Sha, Ma On Shan
7. Lung Mei (龍尾) Plover Cove, East Tai Po
8. Hoi Ha Wan (海下灣) Hoi Ha Wan, North Sai Kung Peninsula
9. Nam She Wan (蚺蛇灣) East Sai Kung, Mirs Bay
10. Tung Wan (東灣) East Sai Kung, Tai Long Wan
11. Tai Wan (大灣) East Sai Kung, Tai Long Wan
12. Ham Tin Wan (鹹田灣) East Sai Kung, Tai Long Wan
13. Tai Long Sai Wan (大浪西灣) East Sai Kung, Tai Long Wan
14. Long Ke Wan (浪茄灣) Long Ke Wan, East Sai Kung
15. Long Ke Tsai (浪茄仔) Long Ke Wan, East Sai Kung
16. Pak Sha Chau (白沙洲) Sai Kung Hoi, Sai Kung
17. Pak Lap Wan (白臘灣) High Island, South Sai Kung
18. Ma Tau Wan (馬頭環) High Island, South Sai Kung
19. Kam Lo Wan (蠄蟧灣) High Island, South Sai Kung
20. Nam Fung Wan (南風灣) High Island, South Sai Kung
21. Kau Sai Wan (滘西灣) Kau Sai Chau, Sai Kung
22. Whiskey (白環) Kau Sai Chau, Sai Kung
23. Campers' Bay (露營灣) Port Shelter, Clearwater Bay
24. Pak Shui Wun (白水碗) Port Shelter, Clearwater Bay
25. Bayside (碧沙灣) Port Shelter, Clearwater Bay
26. Little Palm (小棕林) Port Shelter, Clearwater Bay
27. Lung Ha Wan (龍蝦灣) Port Shelter, Clearwater Bay
28. Ung Kong Wan (甕缸灣) Bluff Island, Clearwater Bay
29. Lung Kwu Upper (龍鼓上灘) Lung Kwu Tan, west Tuen Mun
30. Lung Kwu Lower (龍鼓下灘) Lung Kwu Tan, Tuen Mun
31. Dragon Bay (青龍灣) Tsing Lung Tau, Tsuen Wan
32. To Tei Wan (土地灣) Shek O, Cape D'Aguilar
33. Tai Pak Wan (大白灣) Discovery Bay, East Lantau Island
34. Tai Long Wan (大浪灣) Chi Ma Wan, South Lantau Island
35. Yi Long Wan (二浪灣) Chi Ma Wan, South Lantau Island
36. Sha Lo Wan (沙螺灣) West Tung Chung, North Lantau Island
37. Tai Long Wan (大浪灣) Shek Pik, South Lantau Island
38. Lo Kei Wan (籮箕灣) Shui Hau, South Lantau Island
39. Kau Ling Chung (狗嶺涌) Fan Lau, Southwest Lantau Island
40. Fan Lau Tung Wan (分流東灣) Fan Lau, Southwest Lantau Island
41. Fan Lan Sai Wan (分流西灣) Fan Lau, Southwest Lantau Island
42. Luk Keng Wan (鹿頸灣) Yam O, Northeast Lantau Island
43. Tai Kwai Wan (大貴灣) Northwest Cheung Chau
44. Po Yue Wan (鯆魚灣) Southwest Cheung Chau
45. Pak Tso Wan (白鰽灣) Southwest Cheung Chau
46. Shek Pai Wan (石排灣) Southeast Lamma Island
47. Mo Tat Wan (模達灣) East Lamma Island
48. Kwo Chau Wan (果洲灣) Tai Chau, Ninepin Group
49. Siu A Chau Wan (小鴉洲灣) Siu A Chau, Soko Islands

== Water quality grading system ==
Gazetted beaches in Hong Kong are classified into four grades (Grades 1 – 4) according to the level of E. coli in the water of the beaches. This is done by the Environmental Protection Department. Every week, water samples of each beach are collected for analysis to determine their bacterial level.

Grade 1 means that the water quality of the beaches is good, with an E. coli count of no more than 24 per 100 mL of beach water and no known cases of skin or gastrointestinal illnesses among swimmers there.

Grade 2 means that the water quality of the beaches is fair, with an E. coli count of 25–180 per 100 mL of beach water and no more than 10 reported cases of skin and gastrointestinal illnesses per 1000 swimmers.

Grade 3 means that the water quality of the beaches is poor, with an E. coli count of 181–610 per 100 mL of beach water and 11–15 reported cases of skin and gastrointestinal illnesses per 1000 swimmers.

Grade 4 means that the water quality is very poor, with an E. coli count greater than 610 per 100 mL of beach water. Also the rate of skin and gastrointestinal illnesses is greater than 15 cases per 1000 swimmers. As a result, swimming is not advised at Grade 4 beaches.

== See also ==
- List of beaches
- Environment of Hong Kong
- Geography of Hong Kong
- Conservation in Hong Kong
- List of places in Hong Kong
- Shark net
- Swimming shed
