= List of bays in Hong Kong =

The following is a list of bays in Hong Kong:

== Hong Kong Island ==
Clockwise order from northwest:

- Belcher Bay
- Wan Chai
- Causeway Bay
- Quarry Bay
- Aldrich Bay
- Shau Kei Wan
- Lyee Mun Bay
- Chai Wan
- Siu Sai Wan
- Ngan Wan
- Big Wave Bay
- Shek O Wan
- Island Bay
- Tai Tam Wan
- To Tei Wan
- Turtle Cove
- Tung Tau Wan
- Stanley Bay
- Chung Hom Wan
- South Bay
- Middle Bay
- Repulse Bay
- Deep Water Bay
- Tai Shue Wan
- Po Chong Wan
- Sham Wan
- Shek Pai Wan
- Tin Wan
- Kellett Bay
- Waterfall Bay
- Telegraph Bay
- Sandy Bay

== Kowloon and New Kowloon ==
From west to east:

- Lai Chi Kok Bay
- Cheung Sha Wan
- Hung Hom Bay
- To Kwa Wan
- Ngau Chi Wan
- Kowloon Bay
- Kwun Tong Tsai Wan

== New Territories (excluding New Kowloon) ==
=== Tuen Mun and Yuen Long ===
- Castle Peak Bay
- Deep Bay

=== Tsuen Wan and Kwai Tsing ===
- Tsuen Wan
- Gin Drinkers Bay
- Nam Wan
- Tai Nam Wan
- Sai Tso Wan, Tsing Yi
- Wok Tai Wan

=== Northern and Tai Po ===
- Mirs Bay
- Hoi Ha Wan
- Plover Cove

=== Sha Tin and Sai Kung ===
- Clear Water Bay
- Joss House Bay
- Junk Bay
- Long Ke Wan
- Pak Lap Wan
- Pak Sha Wan
- Po Toi O
- Silverstrand Beach
- Sha Tin Hoi
- Yau Yue Wan

=== Lantau Island ===
- Chi Ma Wan
- Discovery Bay
- Nim Shue Wan
- Hau Hok Wan
- Penny's Bay
- San Shek Wan
- Sha Lo Wan
- Sham Wat Wan
- Siu Ho Wan
- Pui O Wan
- Silvermine Bay
- Tai Ho Wan
- To Kau Wan
- Tsing Chau Wan
- Tung Chung Bay
- Yi O

== See also ==
- Geography of Hong Kong
- List of places in Hong Kong
