= Lo So Shing Beach =

Beach in Lamma Island, Hong Kong

- Beach
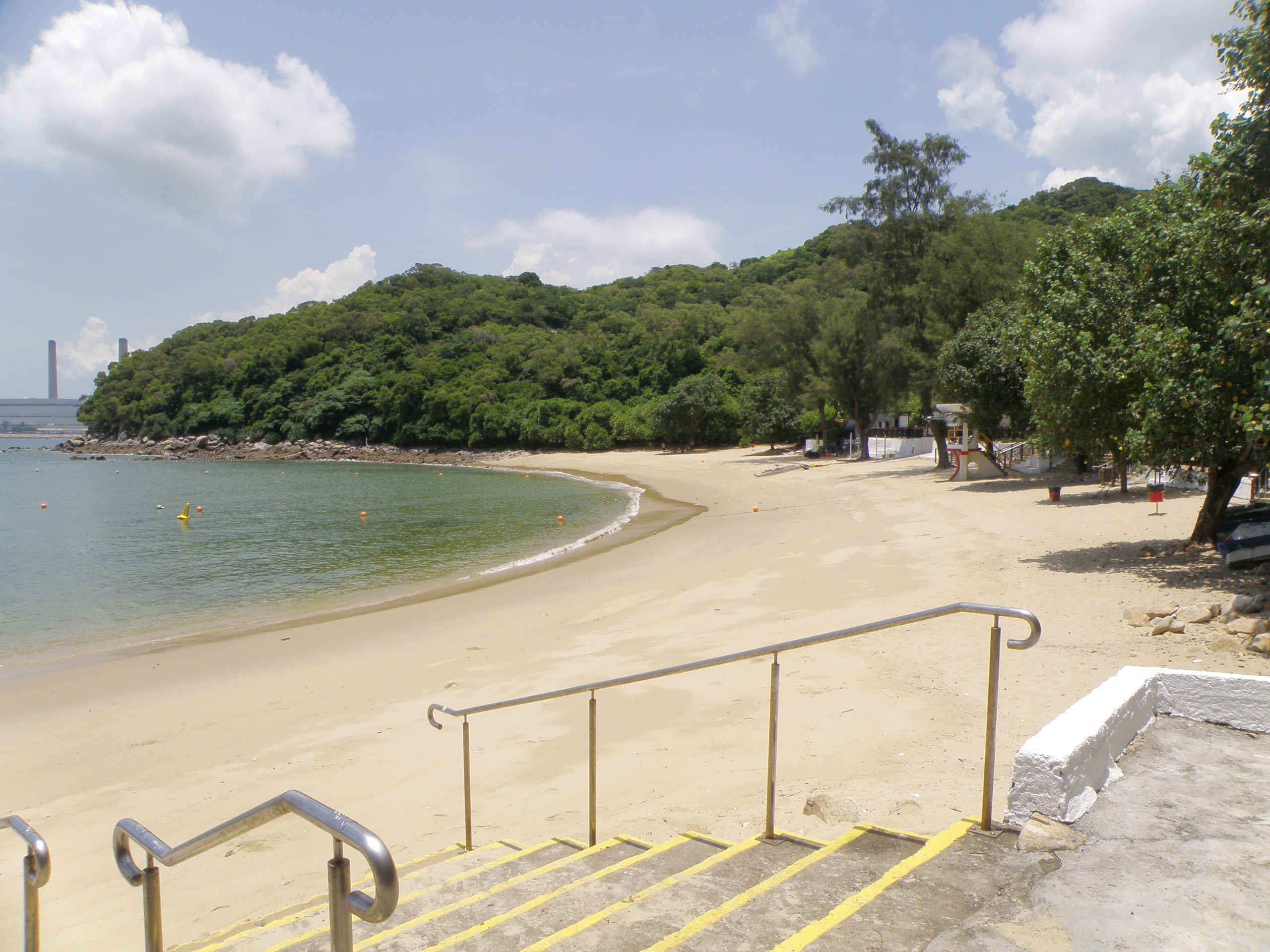
- Lo So Shing Beach

- Location within Hong Kong
- Coordinates: 22.20446°N 114.12271°E
- Location: Lamma Island, Hong Kong

Dimensions
  - Length: 214 m (702 ft)
- Patrolled by: Leisure and Cultural Services Department

Lo So Shing Beach
- Traditional Chinese: 蘆鬚城泳灘
- Simplified Chinese: 芦须城泳滩
Transcriptions
Standard Mandarin
- Hanyu Pinyin: Lú Xū Chéng Yǒng Tān
Yue: Cantonese
- Jyutping: lou4 sou1 sing4 wing6 taan1

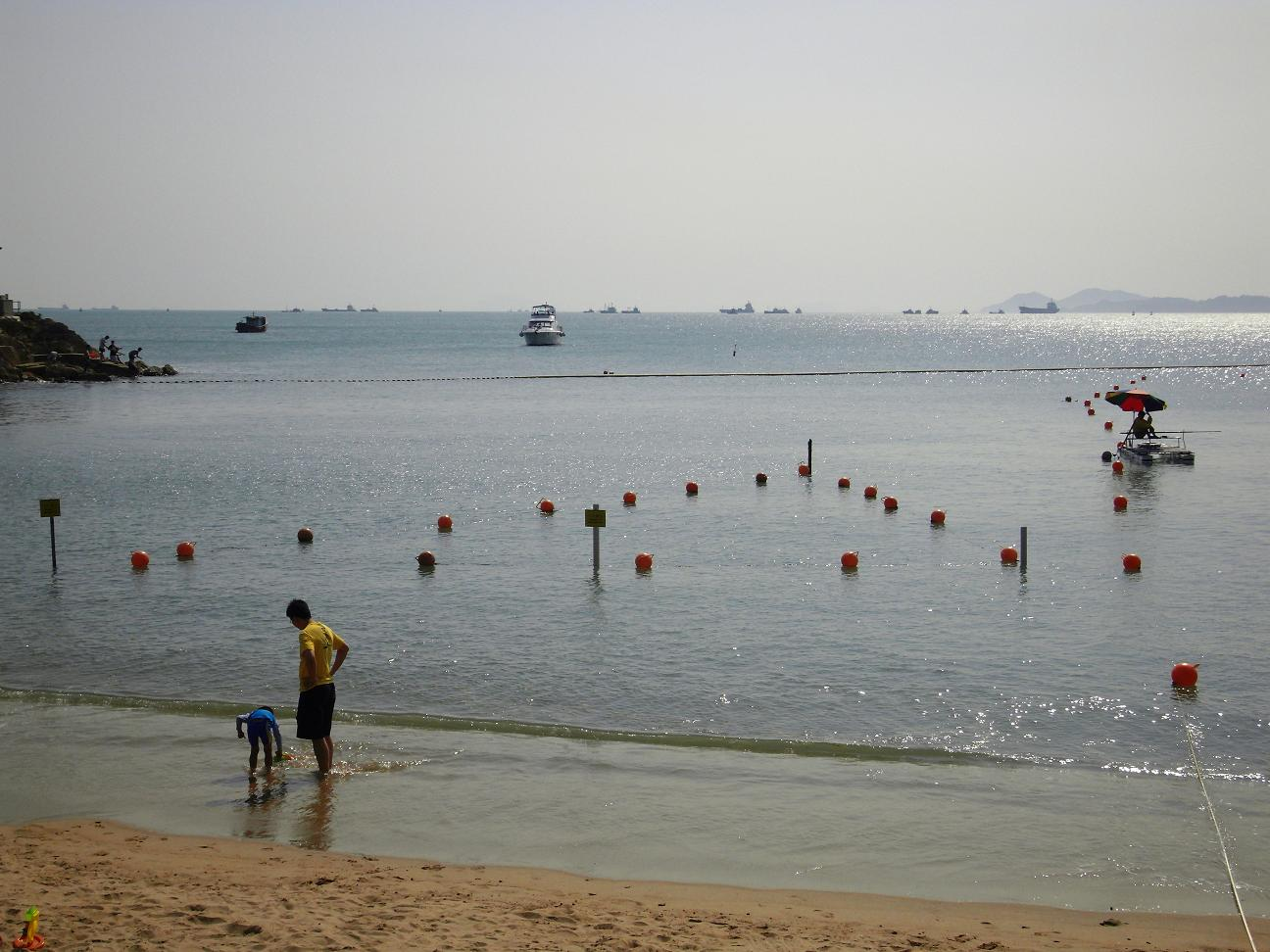
Lo So Shing Beach.

Lo So Shing Beach is a gazetted beach in Lo So Shing in the west of Lamma Island, Hong Kong. The beach has barbecue pits and is managed by the Leisure and Cultural Services Department of the Hong Kong Government. The beach is 214 metres long and is rated as Grade 1 by the Environmental Protection Department for its water quality. It is located several kilometres away from Hung Shing Yeh Beach and there is no road connection to the beach.

== History ==
The beach was gazetted by the Hong Kong Government and opened in 1972.

In June and August 2015, the beach had to be temporarily closed due to oil pollution at the sea that caused the public not to swim at the beach. The beach had to be temporarily closed in August 2017 also due to oil pollution.

== Usage ==
As the beach is remote from both of the ferry piers on Lamma Island, it is particularly quiet. Since reaching the beach requires some walking, it is often practically deserted even on weekends. The beach is accessible from the Lamma Island Family Walk.

== Features ==
The beach has the following features:

- BBQ pits (6 nos.)
- Changing rooms
- Showers
- Toilets
- Water sports centre
- Light refreshment kiosk

== See also ==
- Beaches of Hong Kong
