= Kwun Yam Beach =

Beach in Cheung Chau, Hong Kong

- Beach
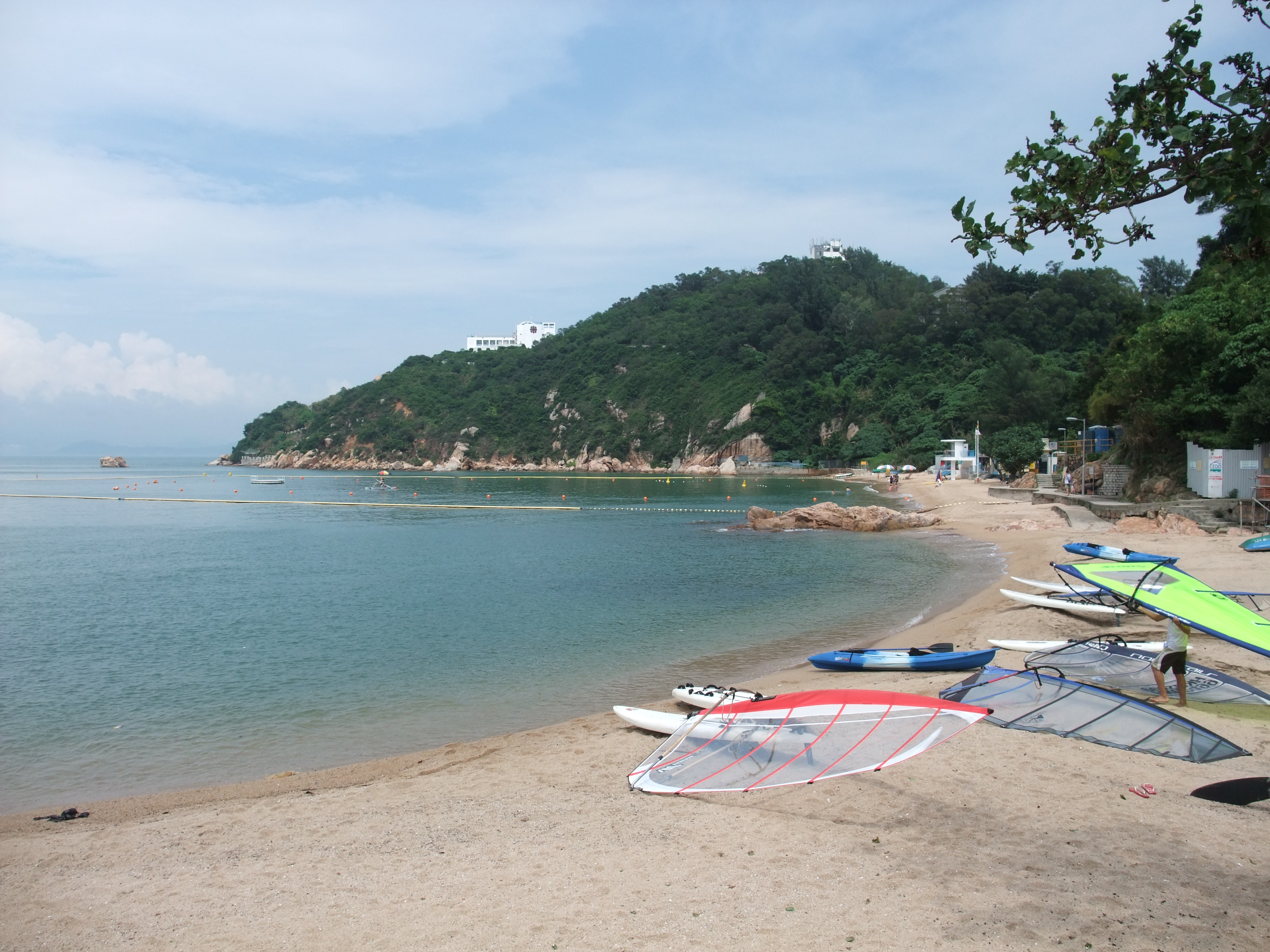
- Kwun Yam Beach

- Location within Hong Kong
- Coordinates: 22.20711°N 114.03448°E
- Location: Cheung Chau, Hong Kong

Dimensions
  - Length: 100 m (330 ft)
- Patrolled by: Leisure and Cultural Services Department

Kwun Yam Beach
- Traditional Chinese: 觀音灣泳灘
- Simplified Chinese: 观音湾泳滩
Transcriptions
Standard Mandarin
- Hanyu Pinyin: Guān Yīn Wān Yǒng Tān
Yue: Cantonese
- Jyutping: gun1 jam1 waan1 wing6 taan1

Kwun Yam Beach, also known as Afternoon Beach, is a gazetted beach facing Kwun Yam Wan on the east coast of Cheung Chau, Hong Kong. The beach is managed by the Leisure and Cultural Services Department of the Hong Kong Government. The beach is 100 metres long and rated as Grade 1 by the Environmental Protection Department for its water quality. It is one of the two gazetted beaches in Cheung Chau along with Cheung Chau Tung Wan Beach. This beach is smaller than Cheung Chau Tung Wan Beach.

== Name ==
The name Kwun Yam refers to the bodhisattva Avalokiteśvara.

== History ==
The beach was gazetted by the Hong Kong Government and opened in 1971.

On 8 January 2017, a body of a 52-year-old angler was found at the beach more than a day after he was reported missing.

== Usage ==
The beach is beautiful, fine and white and is situated on the east coast of Cheung Chau. Since the 1996 Summer Olympics, Kwun Yam Beach had become a tourist spot for local visitors as well as being the home base for Hong Kong's first Olympic gold medallist, windsurfer Lee Lai-shan.

== Features ==
The beach has the following features:

- Changing rooms
- Showers
- Toilets
- Water sports centre
- Light refreshment kiosk

== See also ==
- Beaches of Hong Kong
