= Deep Water Bay Beach =

Beach in Hong Kong Island, Hong Kong

- Beach
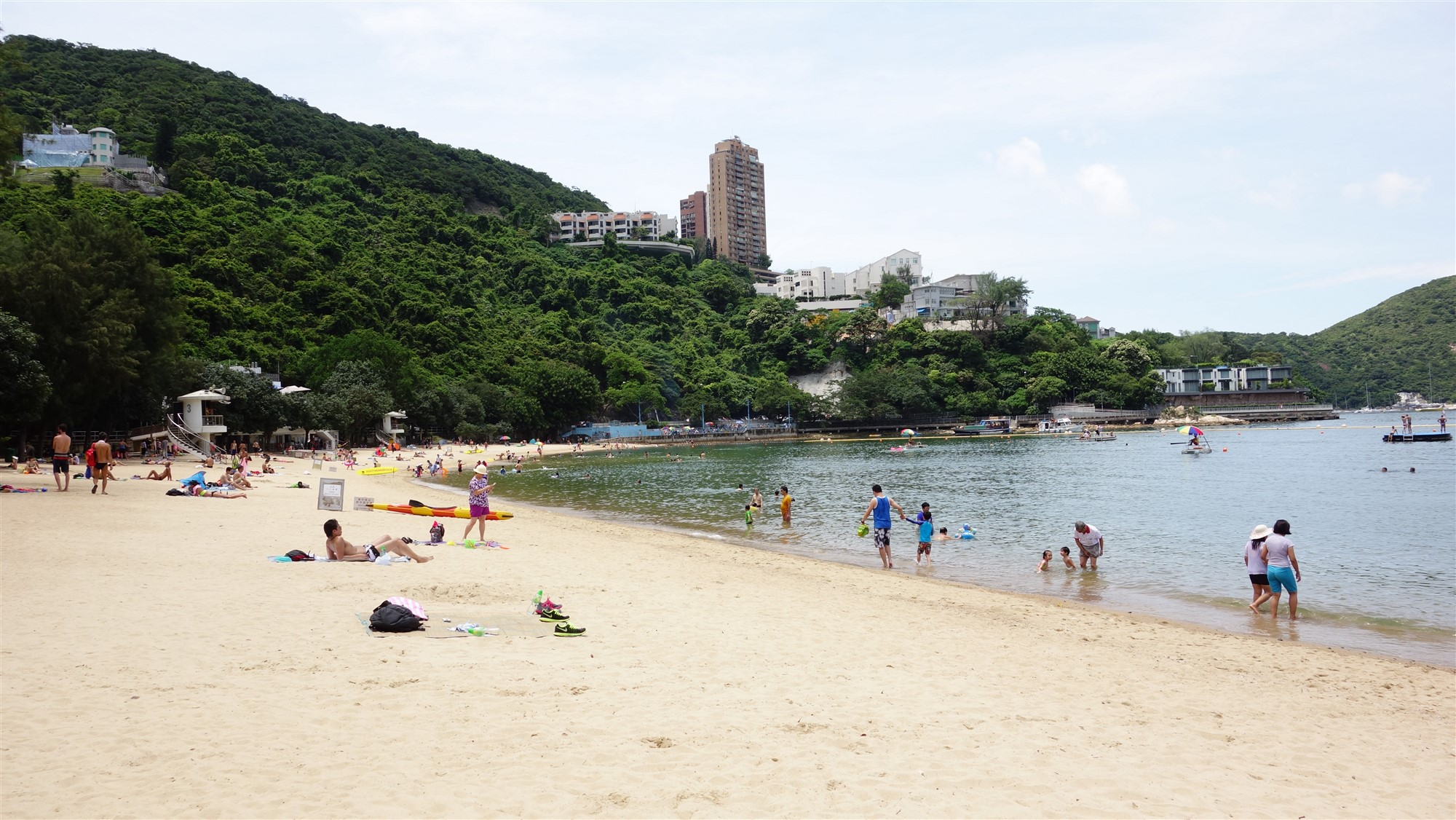
- Deep Water Bay Beach

- Location within Hong Kong
- Coordinates: 22.24448°N 114.1877°E
- Location: Deep Water Bay, Hong Kong Island

Dimensions
  - Length: 400 m (1,300 ft)
- Patrolled by: Leisure and Cultural Services Department

Deep Water Bay Beach
- Traditional Chinese: 深水灣泳灘
- Simplified Chinese: 深水湾泳滩
Transcriptions
Standard Mandarin
- Hanyu Pinyin: Shēn Shuǐ Wān Yǒng Tān
Yue: Cantonese
- Jyutping: sam1 seoi2 waan1 wing6 taan1

Deep Water Bay Beach is a gazetted beach next to Deep Water Bay located to the south of Shouson Hill, Southern District, Hong Kong and is one of the four Hong Kong beaches which remain open during the non-bathing season. It has barbecue pits and is managed by the Leisure and Cultural Services Department of the Hong Kong Government. It is 400 metres long and is rated as Grade 1 by the Environmental Protection Department for its water quality.

== Usage ==
The beach is less known to tourists than the adjacent Repulse Bay and is nonetheless very popular among local people. Seaview Promenade, on the east side of Deep Water Bay, connects it with Repulse Bay, the path allows joggers and walkers alike to exercise alongside the seashore while admiring the stunning sea view, while Mills & Chung Path connects Deep Water Bay with Wong Chuk Hang on the west side.

== Features ==
The beach has the following features:

- BBQ pits (35 nos.)
- Changing rooms
- Showers
- Toilets
- Fast food kiosk
- Water sports centre
- Fee-charging car park

== See also ==
- Beaches of Hong Kong
