= South Bay, Hong Kong =

Bay in Hong Kong Island, Hong Kong

South Bay
- Beach
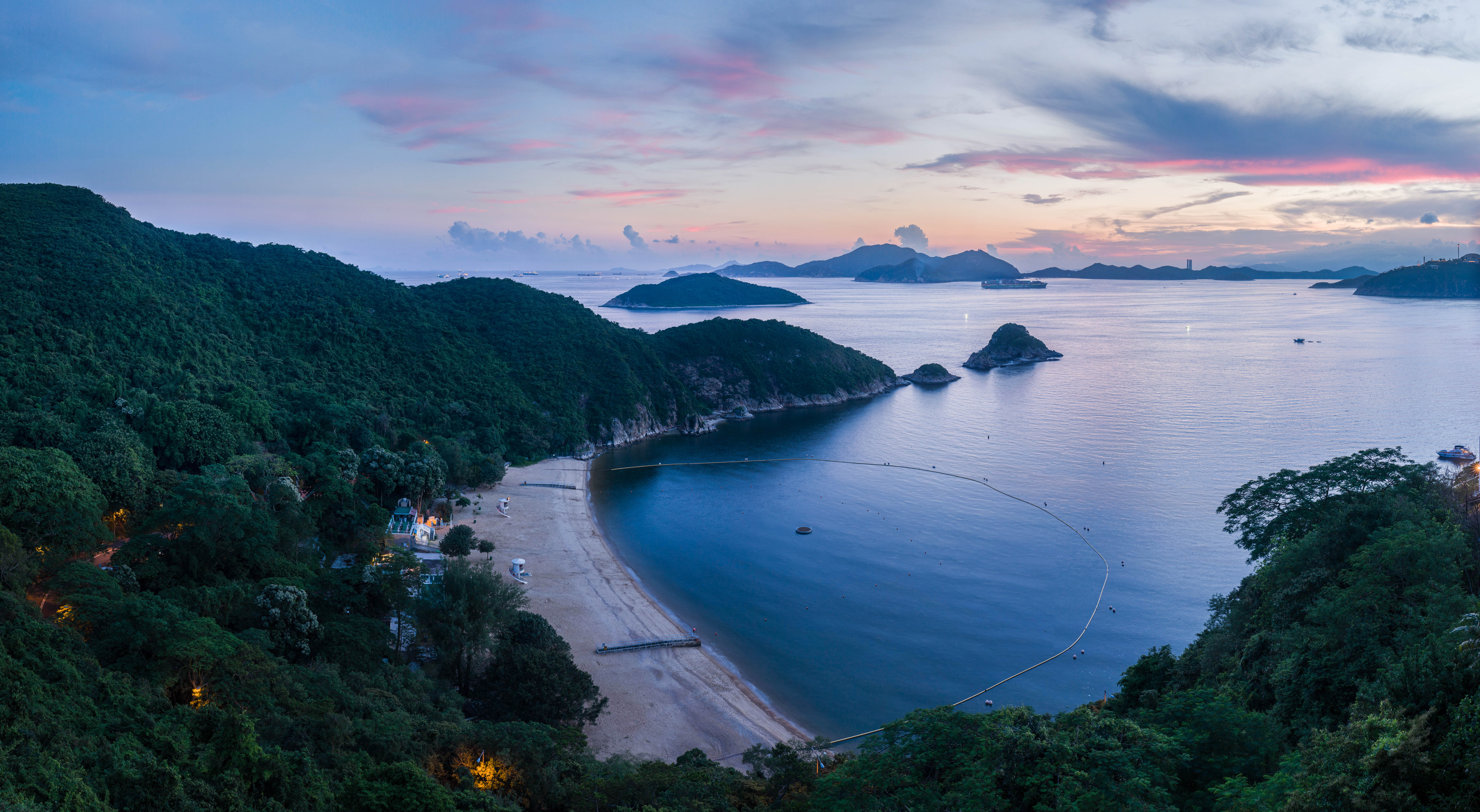
- Overview of beach at sunset, looking towards the south-west

- Coordinates: 22.225098°N 114.197513°E
- Location: Southern District, Hong Kong

Dimensions
  - Length: 250 metres
- Access: South Bay Road

South Bay (Chinese: 南灣) is situated on the southern coast of Hong Kong Island. Situated in the Southern District, it spans approximately 250 m (820 ft) of sandy beachfront. It is an unpatrolled, family-friendly beach known for its calm waters, and is popular with local residents and tourists. It forms part of a string of beaches along with Repulse Bay and Middle Bay. It is accessible via the South Bay Road with regular bus routes serving nearby areas.

== Geography ==
South Bay is situated in the Southern District on the southern coast of Hong Kong Island. It is located to the south of Repulse Bay and Middle Bay, within the Southern District of along the end of South Bay Road. Spanning approximately 250 m (820 ft) of sandy beachfront, South Bay consists of a sandy shore backed by gentle hillside terrain, typical of small coves along the southern coastline. The Environmental Protection Department issues beach water quality forecasts, including for South Bay, with approaches to manage red tide events.

== Beach ==
The South Bay beach is managed by the management of the Leisure and Cultural Services Department of the Government of Hong Kong, which oversees 12 beaches in the Southern District. As an uninhabited shoreline, South Bay itself has no permanent residents, but is frequented by residents of the Southern District, which houses around 263,000 people as of 2021. South Bay is renowned for its laid-back coastal lifestyle compared to busier beaches like Repulse and Shek O, and supports a leisure tourism ecosystem. Facilities include changing rooms, showers, barbeque pits, bathing sheds, and a safety raft. It is usually crowded during the weekends, but is quite empty during the weekdays.

The South Bay Road provides primary access, with nearby bus routes linking through Ap Lei Chau (South Bay) bus terminus, connecting commuters and beach-goers. The Hong Kong Transport Department operates buses, minibuses, ferries, and trams collectively to the Southern District.

== See also ==
- List of bays in Hong Kong
- Beaches of Hong Kong
