= Pui O Beach =

Beach in New Territories, Hong Kong

- Beach
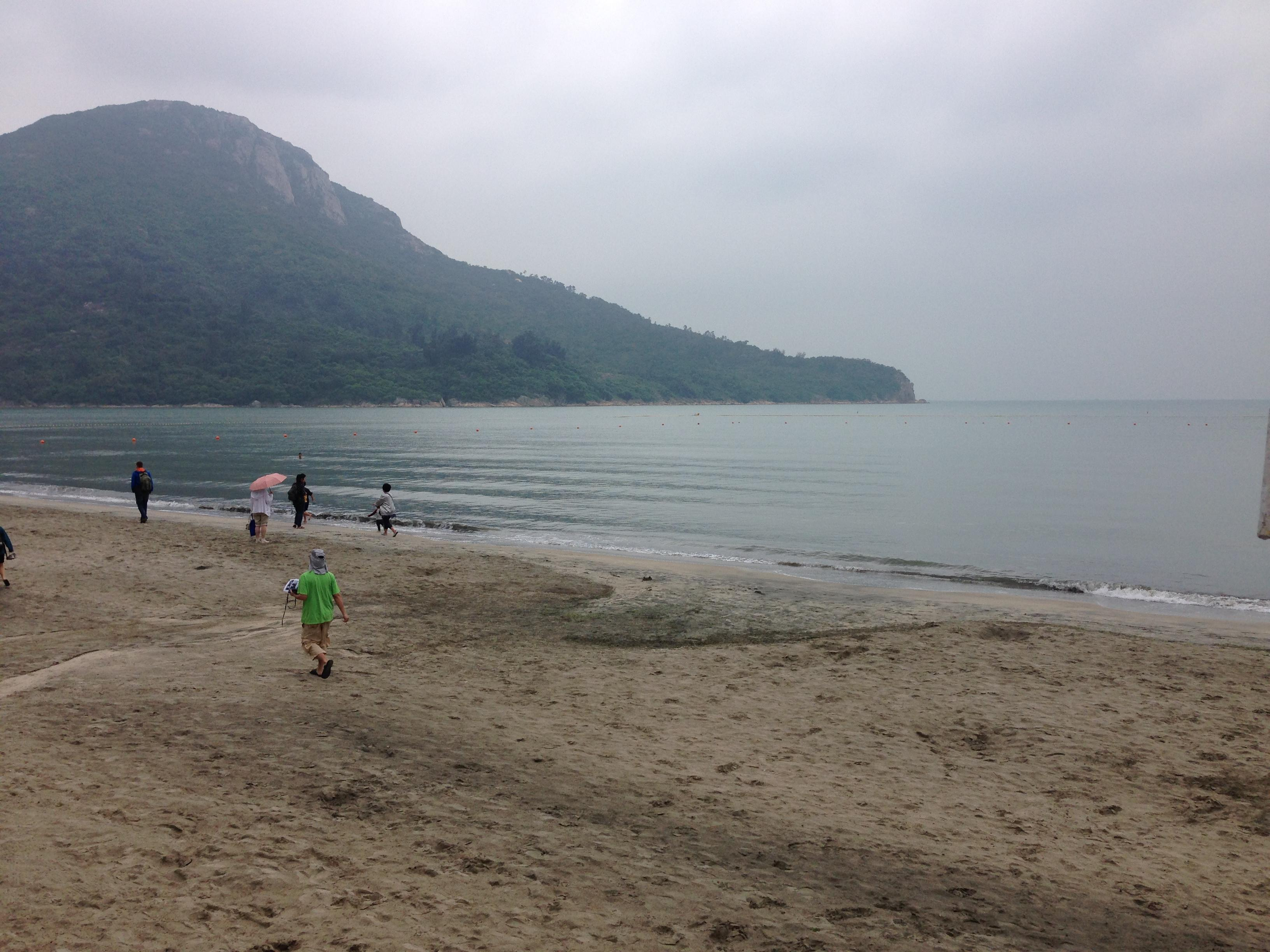
- Pui O Beach

- Location within Hong Kong
- Coordinates: 22.23999°N 113.97594°E
- Location: Pui O, Lantau Island

Dimensions
  - Length: 260 m (850 ft)
- Patrolled by: Leisure and Cultural Services Department

Pui O Beach
- Traditional Chinese: 貝澳泳灘
- Simplified Chinese: 贝澳泳滩
Transcriptions
Standard Mandarin
- Hanyu Pinyin: Bèi Ào Yǒng Tān
Yue: Cantonese
- Jyutping: bui3 ou3 wing6 taan1

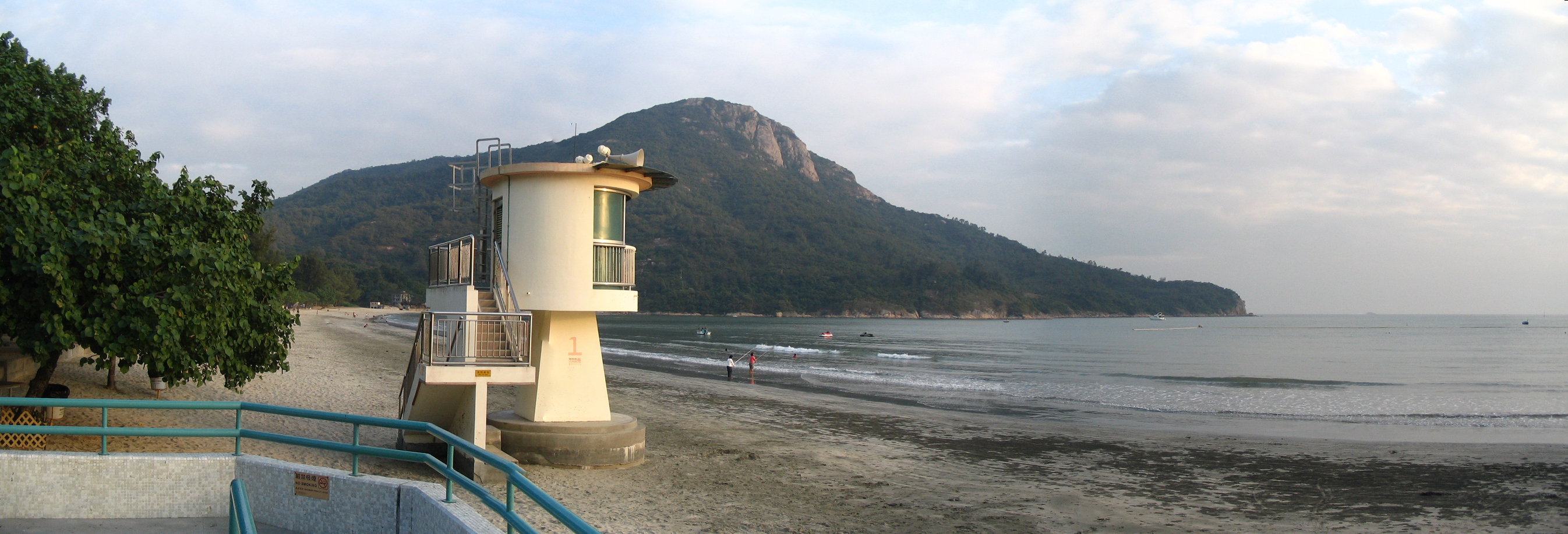
Pui O Beach

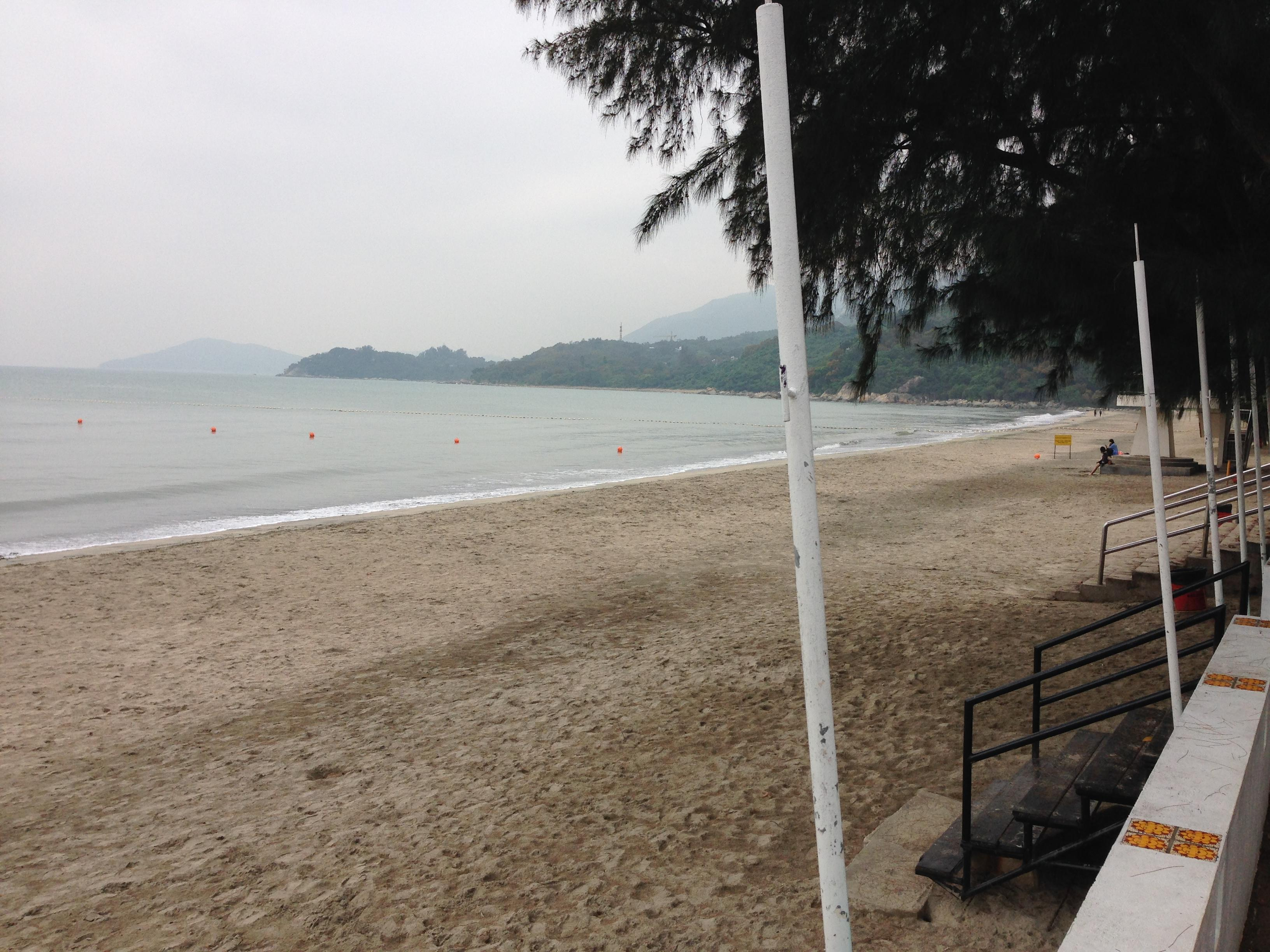
Pui O Beach

Pui O Beach is a gazetted beach running along almost the entire shoreline of Pui O in Lantau Island, Hong Kong, facing Pui O Wan and neighbouring Chi Ma Wan Peninsula. The beach has barbecue pits and is managed by the Leisure and Cultural Services Department of the Hong Kong Government. The beach is 260 metres long and is rated as good to fair by the Environmental Protection Department for its water quality in the past twenty years. The water flow of Pui O Beach comes from the sea and nearby rivers, so Pui O Beach is the junction of fresh water.

== Usage ==
Due to the geological composition of surrounding area, the sand on the beach is mixture of black and yellow. The Hong Kong Government has constructed facilities on the upper beach for wild camping. As the beach faces south-southwest, the sunset can be clearly watched in Pui O. There are many restaurants beside the beaches, most of which sell swimming supplies and food.

== Features ==
The beach has the following features:

- BBQ pits (six)
- Changing rooms
- Showers
- Toilets
- Fast food kiosk

=== Pui O Campsite ===
There is a campsite at Pui O Beach that is open to the public and free of charge. It is open 24 hours for camping and is managed by the Leisure and Cultural Services Department. Users can register with the management office before using it. There are a total of 52 camping spots in the camping site, each of which is divided by wooden fences, and the ground is mainly sand. The camp is equipped with facilities like camp bays, barbecue pits and an office. The camp is currently temporarily closed until further notice due to COVID-19 pandemic.

== Incident ==
On 23 November 2018, Billy, a widely known eight-year-old bull who lived at the beach, died with his stomach full of plastic bags. An examination showed that the animal’s stomach and intestinal tract had been blocked with enough plastic bags to fill two rubbish bins.

== See also ==
- Beaches of Hong Kong
