= Lower Cheung Sha Beach =

Beach in Lantau Island, New Territories, Hong Kong

- Beach
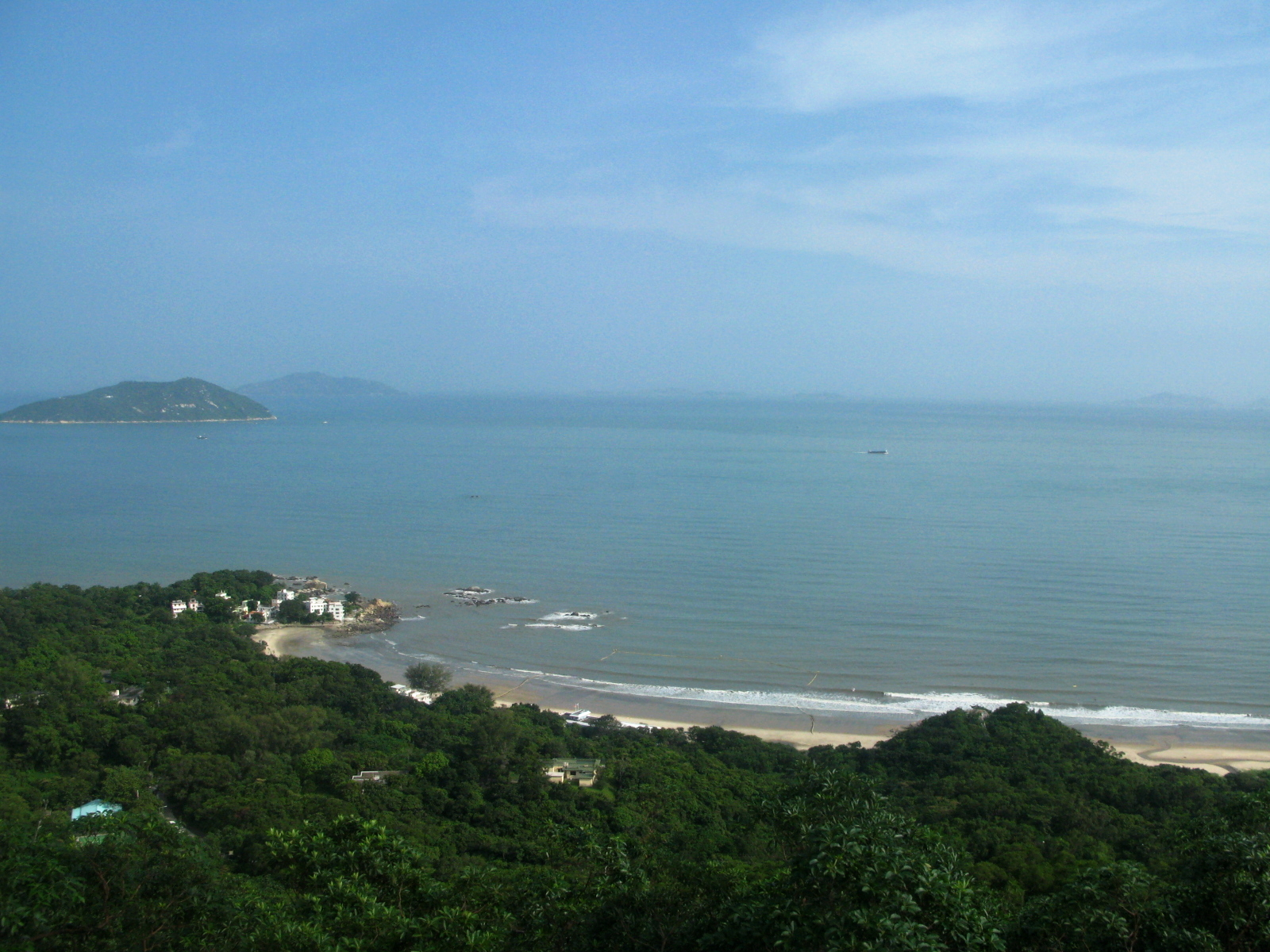
- Lower Cheung Sha Beach

- Location within Hong Kong
- Coordinates: 22.23411°N 113.9553°E
- Location: Cheung Sha, Lantau Island

Dimensions
  - Length: 96 m (315 ft)
- Patrolled by: Leisure and Cultural Services Department

Lower Cheung Sha Beach
- Traditional Chinese: 下長沙泳灘
- Simplified Chinese: 下长沙泳滩
Transcriptions
Standard Mandarin
- Hanyu Pinyin: Xià Cháng Shā Yǒng Tān
Yue: Cantonese
- Jyutping: haa6 coeng4 saa1 wing6 taan1

Lower Cheung Sha Beach is a gazetted beach located in Cheung Sha in southern Lantau Island, Hong Kong. The beach is managed by the Leisure and Cultural Services Department of the Hong Kong Government. The beach is 96 metres long and is rated as good to fair by the Environmental Protection Department for its water quality in the past twenty years. Near the beach is the Upper Cheung Sha Beach, but the Upper Cheung Sha Beach is not connected to the Lower Cheung Sha Beach.

== Usage ==
The beach is set within a large embayment on Lantau Island’s southern coastline formed by the Chi Ma Wan Peninsula and Luk Keng Shan. The beach, along with Tong Fuk and Upper Cheung Sha beaches, offers beautiful views of Cha Kwo Chau.

== Features ==
The beach has the following features:

- Changing rooms
- Showers
- Toilets

== See also ==
- Beaches of Hong Kong
