= Rocky Bay Beach =

Beach in Hong Kong Island, Hong Kong

- Beach
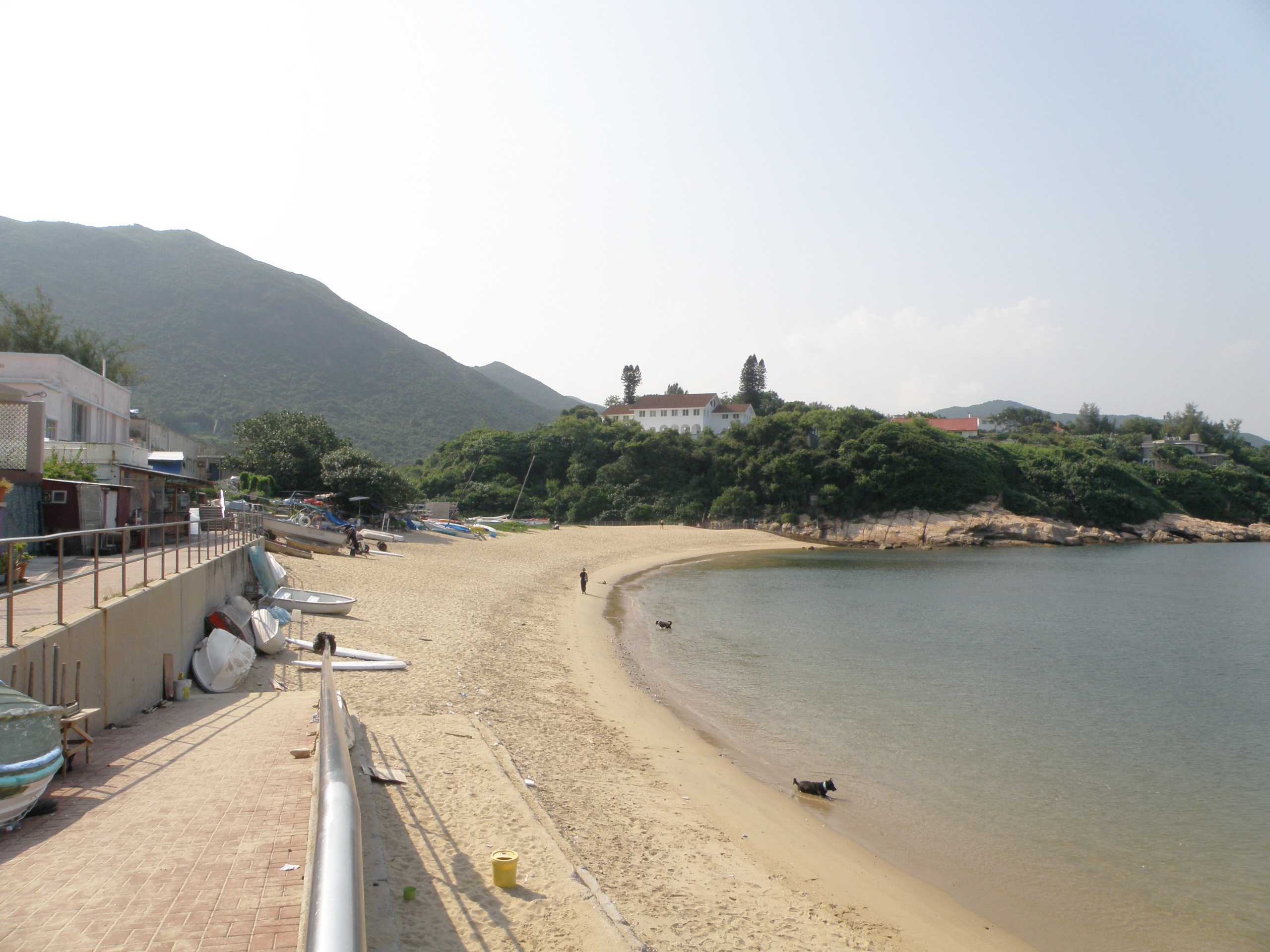
- Rocky Bay Beach

- Coordinates: 22.231672°N 114.251734°E
- Location: Shek O, Hong Kong Island
- Patrolled by: Leisure and Cultural Services Department

Rocky Bay Beach
- Traditional Chinese: 石澳後灘泳灘
- Simplified Chinese: 石澳后滩泳滩
Transcriptions
Standard Mandarin
- Hanyu Pinyin: Shí Ào Hòu Tān Yǒng Tān
Yue: Cantonese
- Jyutping: sek6 ou3 hau6 taan1 wing6 taan1

Rocky Bay Beach is a gazetted beach located behind Shek O Beach in Shek O, Southern District, Hong Kong. The beach is managed by the Leisure and Cultural Services Department of the Hong Kong Government. The beach did not get its grading and it is currently not open for swimming as no lifeguard facilities are available.

== History ==
In 1988, due to the discharge of sewage from the Shek O Village and squatter areas in the hinterland into the beach area, the beach had to be closed for swimming.

On 16 October 2012, a 56-year-old man fell into the sea and had drowned near the beach while he was drinking alcohol. He was rescued by two police officers of the Marine Region and he was rushed by a speedboat to the Marine Regional Headquarters in Sai Wan Ho. He was then taken by an ambulance to Pamela Youde Nethersole Eastern Hospital where he was pronounced dead.

== Usage ==
The beach is currently not open for swimming due to the lack of facilities and lifeguard services available at the beach. It also offers views of Tung Lung Chau.

== See also ==
- Beaches of Hong Kong
