= Lo So Shing =

Coordinates: 22.205282°N 114.124987°E

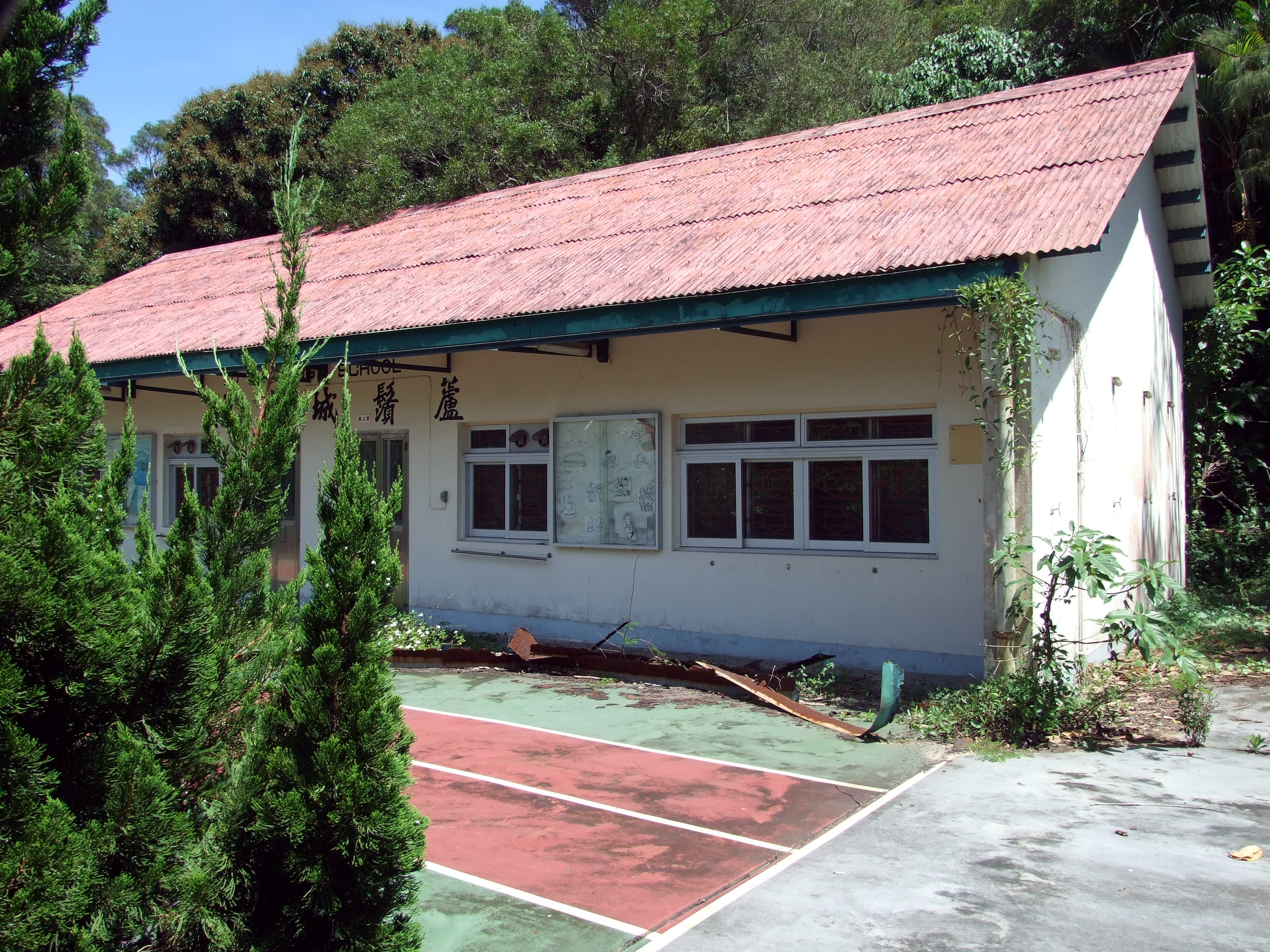
Former Lo So Shing School.

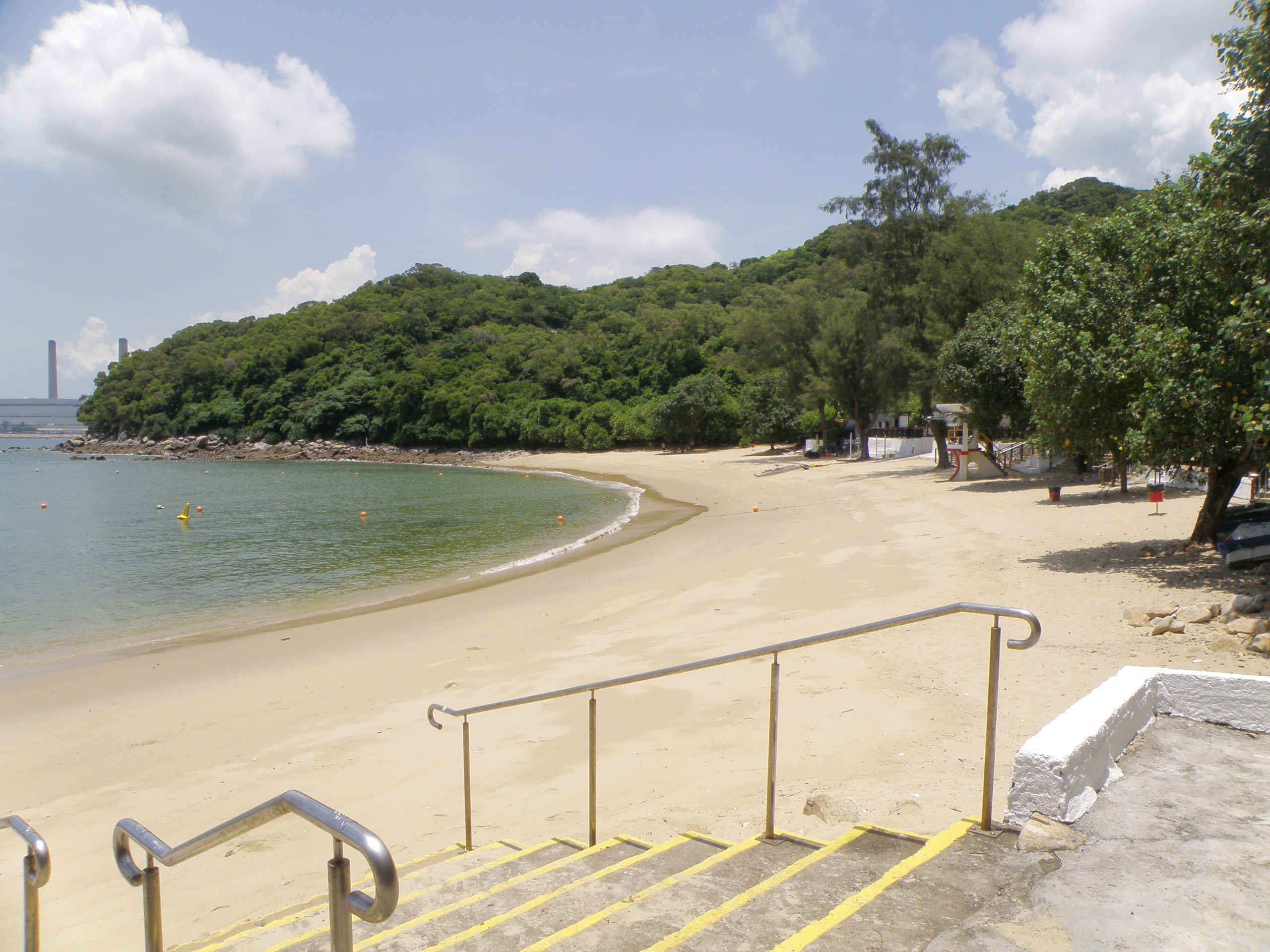
Lo So Shing Beach.

Lo So Shing (Chinese: 蘆鬚城) is a village located on Lamma Island, the third largest island in the territory of Hong Kong.

== Administration ==
Lo So Shing is a recognized village under the New Territories Small House Policy.

== History ==
The Bronze Age in Hong Kong is equivalent to the period extending from the middle of the Shang dynasty to the Qin dynasty. Archaeological remains from this age have been excavated at Lo So Shing on Lamma Island.

The semi-abandoned village on Lamma Island is more than 300 years old and the early settlers were mostly farmers.

At the time of the 1911 census, the population of Lo So Shing was 75. The number of males was 30.

The abandoned school at the village of Lo So Shing was closed in 2004 due to a lack of students.

== See also ==
- Lo So Shing Beach
