= Cheung Chau Tung Wan Beach =

Beach in Cheung Chau, Hong Kong

- Beach
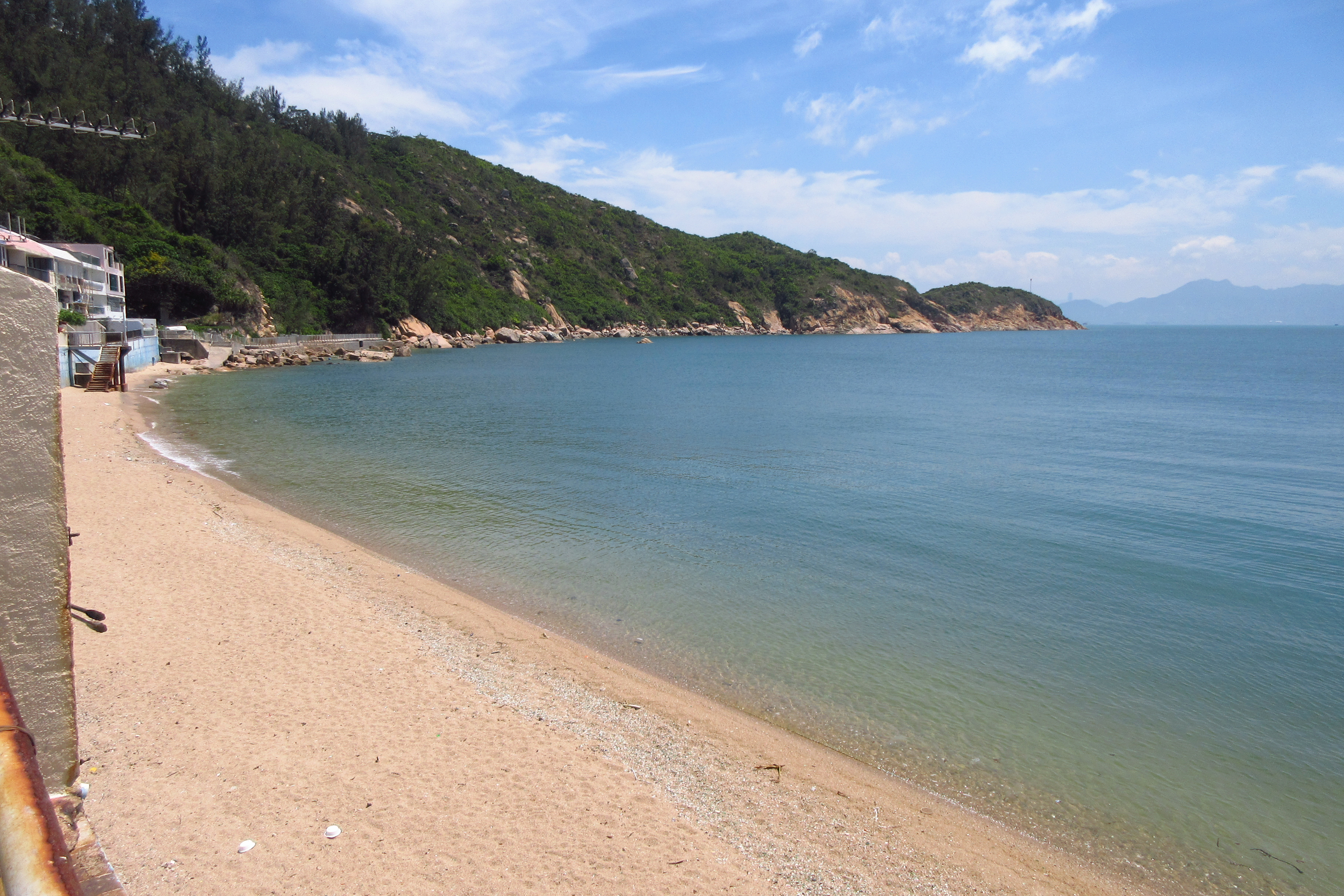
- Cheung Chau Tung Wan Beach

- Location within Hong Kong
- Coordinates: 22.20932°N 114.03073°E
- Location: Cheung Chau, Hong Kong

Dimensions
  - Length: 230 m (750 ft)
- Patrolled by: Leisure and Cultural Services Department

Cheung Chau Tung Wan Beach
- Traditional Chinese: 長洲東灣泳灘
- Simplified Chinese: 长洲东湾泳滩
Transcriptions
Standard Mandarin
- Hanyu Pinyin: Cháng Zhōu Dōng Wān Yǒng Tān
Yue: Cantonese
- Jyutping: coeng4 zau1 dung1 waan1 wing6 taan1

Cheung Chau Tung Wan Beach is a gazetted beach facing Tung Wan on the east coast of Cheung Chau, Hong Kong. The beach is managed by the Leisure and Cultural Services Department of the Hong Kong Government. The beach is 230 metres long and is rated as Grade 1 by the Environmental Protection Department for its water quality. It is one of the two beaches in Cheung Chau along with Kwun Yam Beach and the beach is the largest in the island.

== History ==
The rock carvings located near the beach were reported by geologists in 1970 and were gazetted as declared monuments of Hong Kong in 1982.

== Usage ==
The beach is long and narrow and the whole journey will take 15 minutes and the beach is where Hong Kong's first Olympic medallist, Lee Lai-shan, practised windsurfing when she was young.

== Features ==
The beach has the following features:

- Changing rooms
- Showers
- Toilets
- Water sports centre

== See also ==
- Beaches of Hong Kong
