= Turtle Cove Beach =

Beach on Hong Kong Island

- Beach
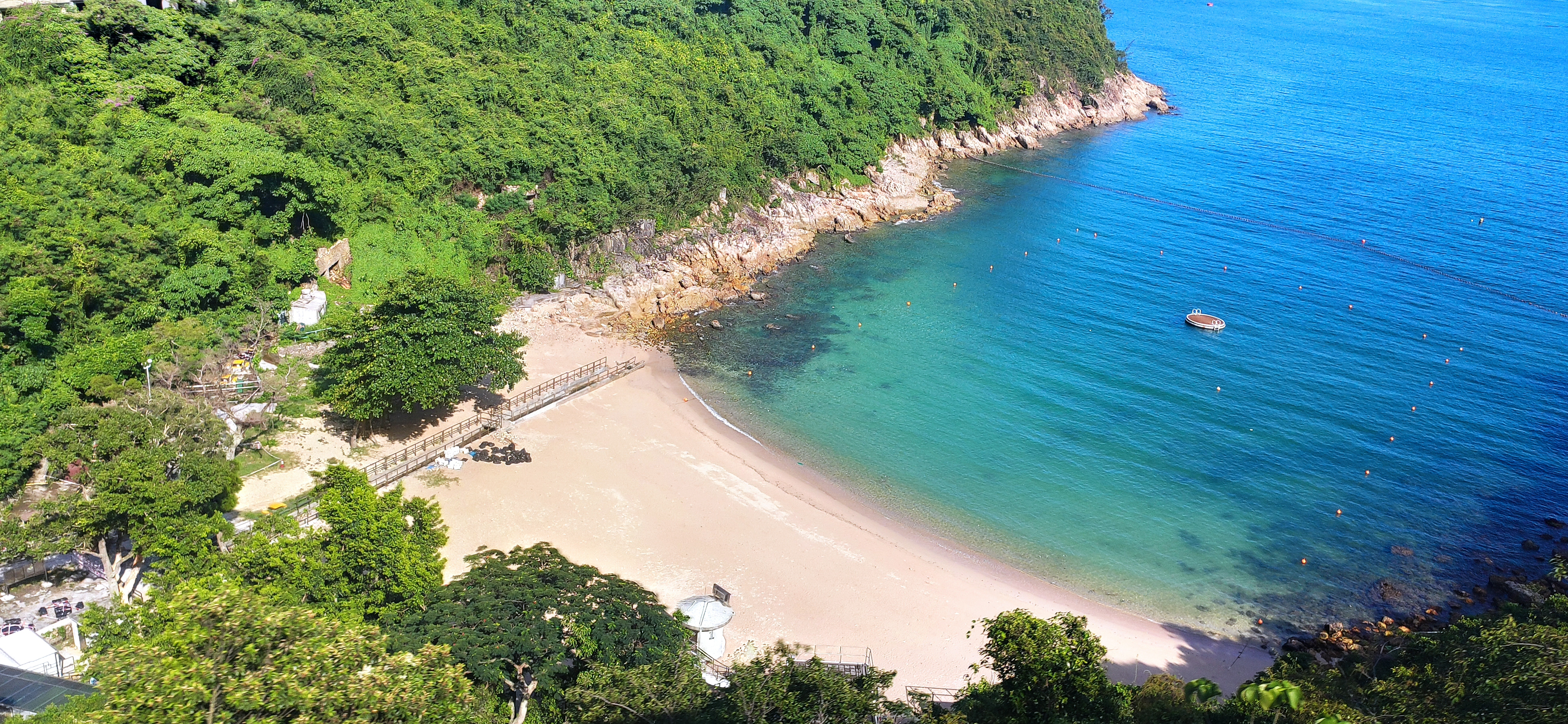
- Turtle Cove Beach

- Location within Hong Kong
- Coordinates: 22.23303°N 114.22319°E
- Location: Tai Tam, Hong Kong Island

Dimensions
  - Length: 73 metres
- Patrolled by: Leisure and Cultural Services Department

Turtle Cove Beach
- Traditional Chinese: 龜背灣泳灘
- Simplified Chinese: 龟背湾泳滩
Transcriptions
Standard Mandarin
- Hanyu Pinyin: Guī Bèi Wān Yǒng Tān
Yue: Cantonese
- Jyutping: gwai1 bui3 waan1 wing6 taan1

Turtle Cove Beach is a gazetted beach in Southern District, Hong Kong, located west of Red Hill (Pak Pat Shan) and east of Stanley. The beach has barbecue pits and is managed by the Leisure and Cultural Services Department of the Hong Kong Government. The beach is rated as Grade 1 by the Environmental Protection Department for its water quality and is 73 metres long.

== History ==
In 2017, a palm oil spill from a mainland Chinese vessel collision nearby forced the closure of the beach for safety reasons.

== Features ==
The beach has the following features:

- BBQ pits (12 nos.)
- Changing rooms
- Showers
- Toilets
- Playground
- Water sports centre

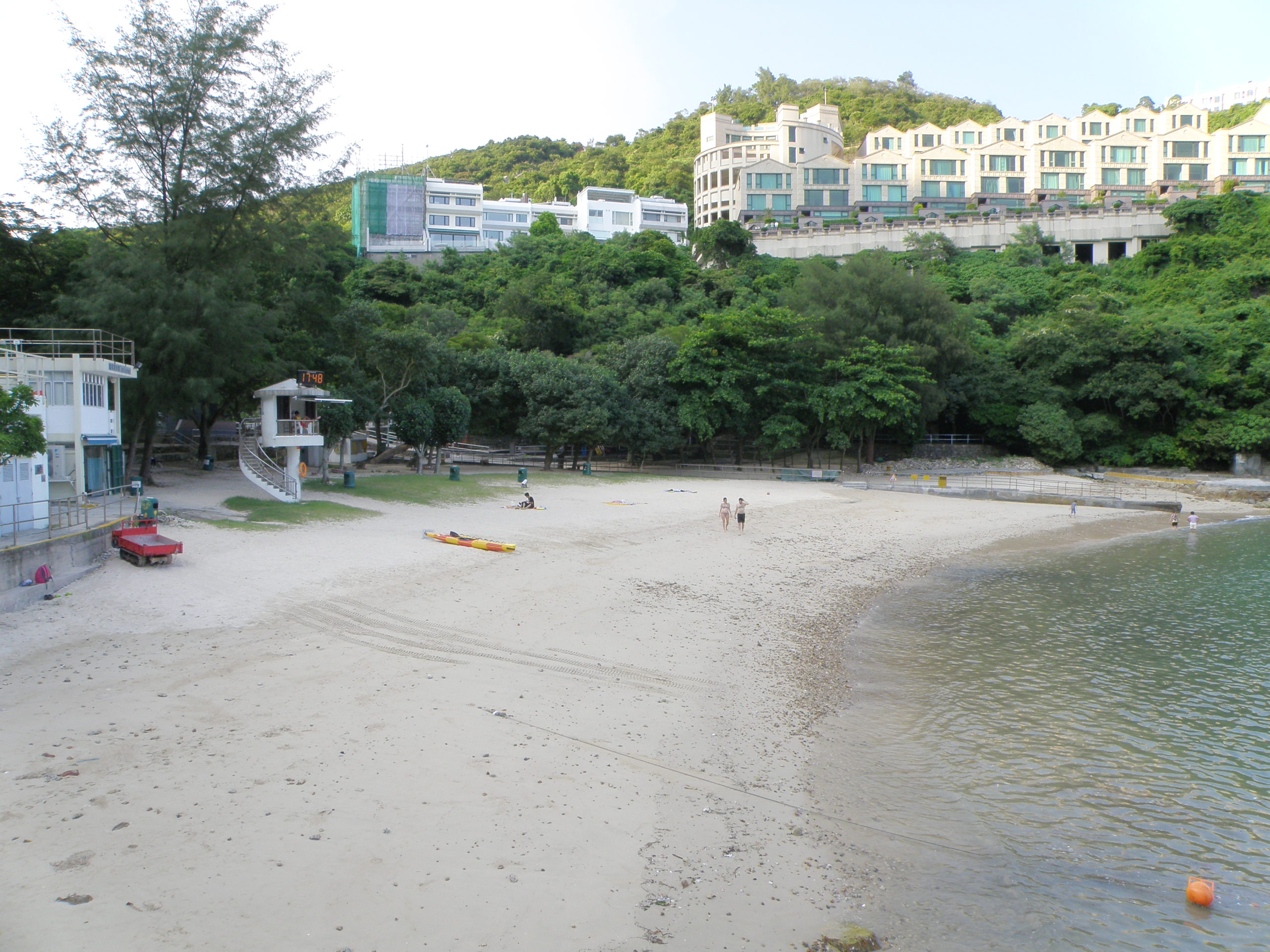
Turtle Cove Beach

== See also ==
- Beaches of Hong Kong
