= Cheung Sha =

Area of Lantau Island, Hong Kong

Cheung Sha Chinese: 長沙
- Rural area
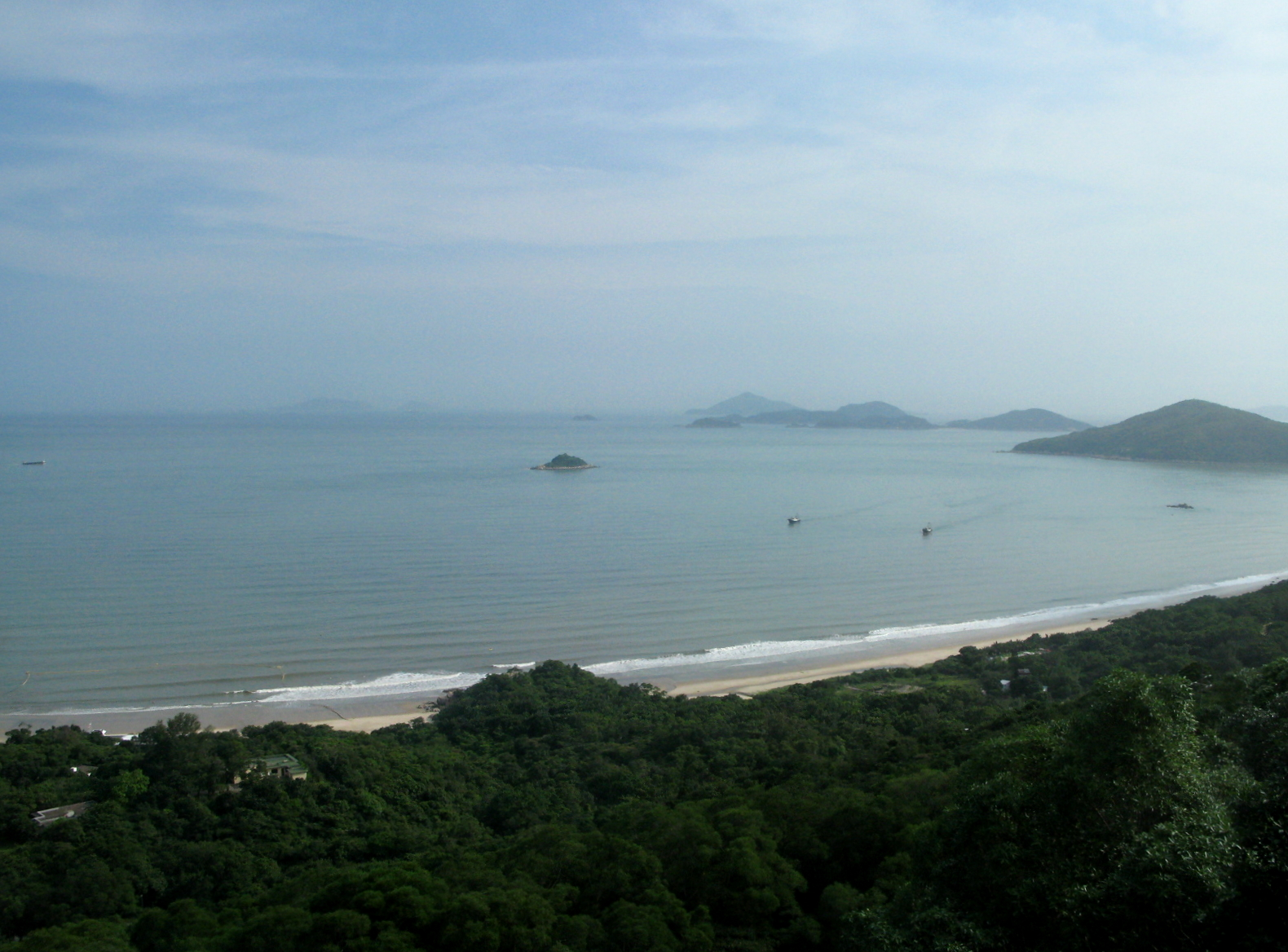
- Upper Cheung Sha Beach
- Interactive map of Cheung Sha
- Country: China
- Region: Hong Kong
- Area: New Territories
- Island: Lantau Island

Cheung Sha (Chinese: 長沙) is a rural area on the south coast of Lantau Island, New Territories, Hong Kong. Along the South Lantau Road, Cheung Sha is located between Tong Fuk (to the southwest) and San Shek Wan (to the northeast).

The most notable feature of the area is the Cheung Sha Beach, the longest beach in Hong Kong.

== History ==
The South Lantau Road, passing through Cheung Sha, was built in the mid-20th century from Silver Mine Bay to Shek Pik for access to the new reservoir there.

== Features ==
Cheung Sha is rural in character and largely undeveloped.

It is home to two small villages, namely Cheung Sha Ha Tsuen (長沙下村; 'Cheung Sha Lower Village') and Cheung Sha Sheung Tsuen (長沙上村; 'Cheung Sha Upper Village'). There are also a few low-density private housing developments. Cheung Sha Lower Village and Cheung Sha Upper Village are recognized villages under the New Territories Small House Policy.

The Cheung Sha Beach (長沙泳灘) is the longest beach in Hong Kong. It actually comprises two beaches separated by a rocky outcropping: Lower Cheung Sha Beach (下長沙泳灘) and Upper Cheung Sha Beach (上長沙泳灘). On its own, Upper Cheung Sha Beach is still the longest beach in Hong Kong.

The Hong Kong Government has holiday bungalows for government employees at Cheung Sha.

== Proposed development ==
In January 2016, the Lantau Development Advisory Committee (LanDAC) proposed to build spas, resort hotels, and a "wedding centre" at Cheung Sha. The suggestion was part of a wider proposal to undertake major development of Lantau Island, increasing its population from approximately 100,000 to one million.

The proposals were positively received by the government, but decried by various advocacy groups as destructive urban sprawl reliant on more "white elephant" infrastructure projects.
