= Mang Kung Uk =

Coordinates: 22.314724°N 114.276913°E

Mang Kung Uk (Chinese: 孟公屋) is a village in Sai Kung District, New Territories, Hong Kong.

== Administration ==
Mang Kung Uk is a recognized village under the New Territories Small House Policy.

== See also ==
- Hang Hau
