= Silverstrand Beach =

Beach in Hong Kong

Coordinates: 22°19′23″N 114°16′19″E

- Traditional Chinese: 銀線灣
- Simplified Chinese: 银线湾
Transcriptions
Standard Mandarin
- Hanyu Pinyin: Yínxiàn wān
Yue: Cantonese
- Jyutping: ngan4 sin3 waan1

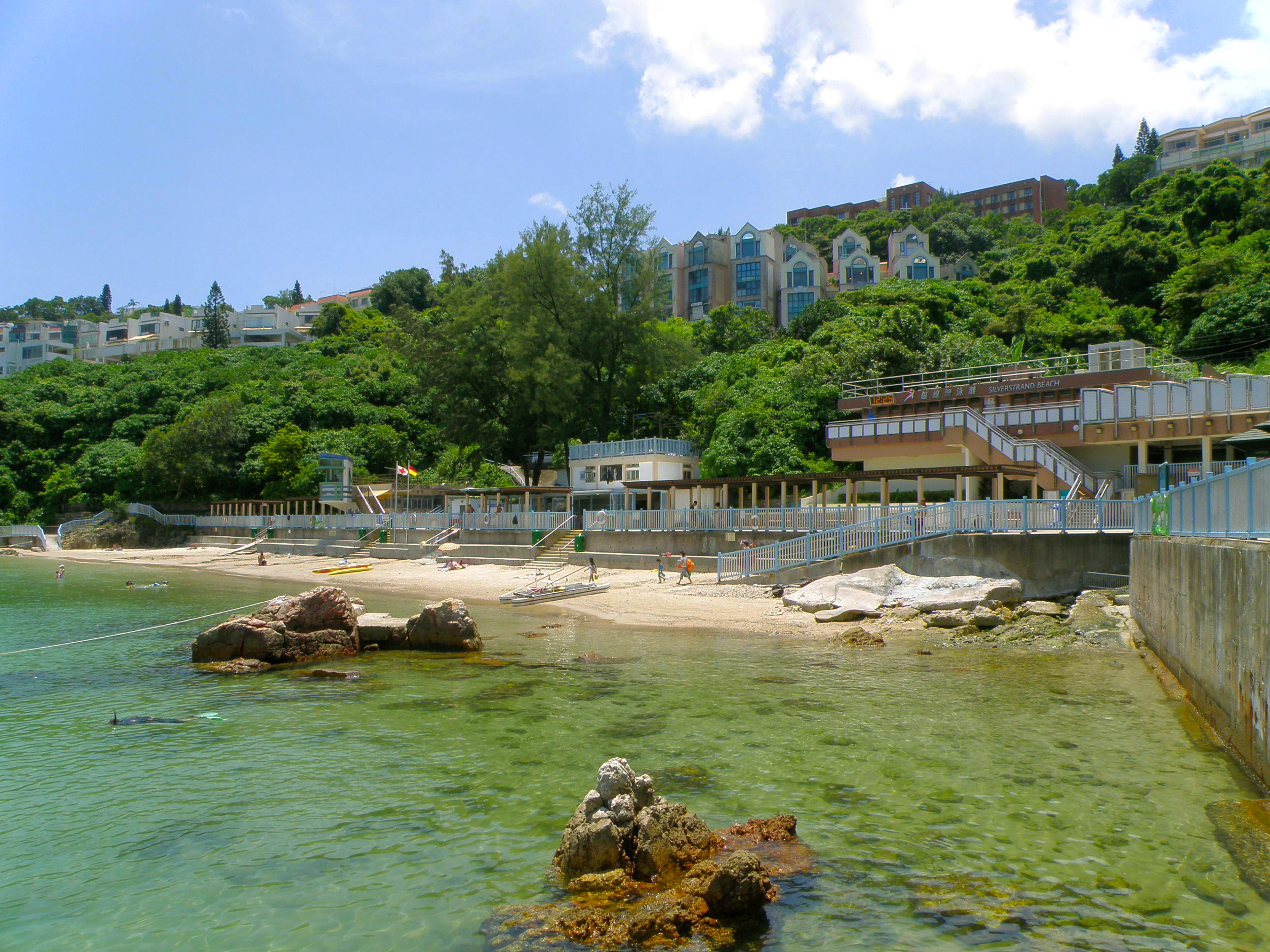
Silverstrand Beach

Silverstrand Beach (Chinese: 銀線灣) is small narrow beach located in Clear Water Bay Peninsula, Sai Kung, Hong Kong.

== Management ==
Like many other beaches in Hong Kong, it is managed by the Leisure and Cultural Services Department. A wide range of facilities are available, including car parking facilities, refreshment kiosks, barbecue pits, changing rooms and shower facilities. Life guard and first aid service hours are 9am-6pm from April to October and 8am-7pm on weekends and on public holidays from June to August.

== Water quality ==
As of April 2026, Silverstrand Beach is designated as Grade 1 in the Environmental Protection Department's "Beach Water Quality Forecast Index". This is the highest possible rating in the scale, which ranges from Grades 1-4, and corresponds to a predicted E. coli concentration of 24 or less per 100 mL.

== Shark attacks ==
There have been two fatal shark attacks on record at Silverstrand Beach:

- 11 June 1993: a 60-year-old man, Kwong Guang-Hing (鄺廣興) lost his right arm and left leg and succumbed to his injuries.
- 8 June 1991: a 65-year-old woman, Leung Kam-Ho (梁金好) was bitten on her right leg and waist and died.
