= Hung Shing Yeh Beach =

Beach in Lamma Island, Hong Kong, China

Hung Shing Yeh Beach 洪聖爺灣泳灘
- beach
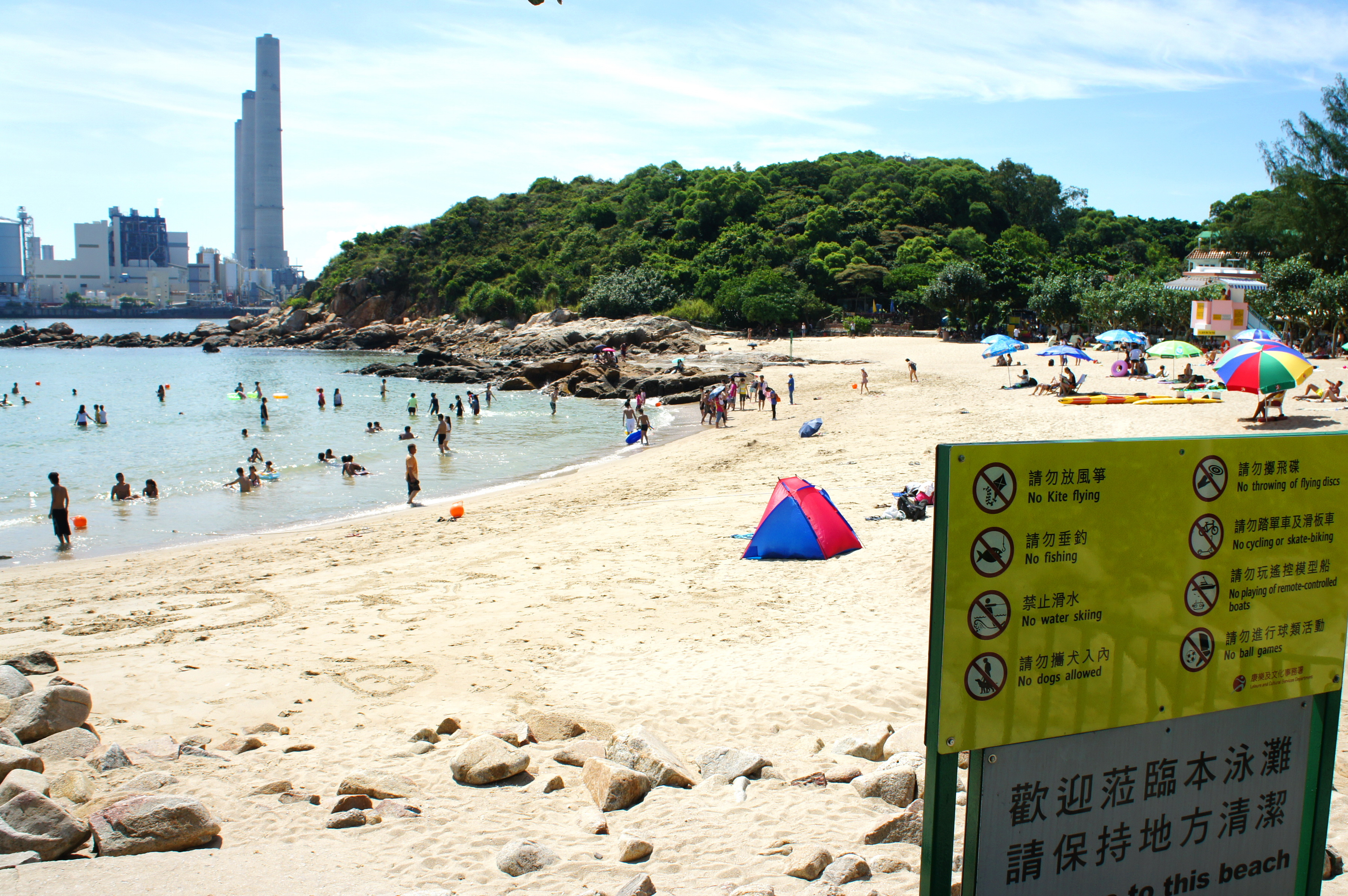

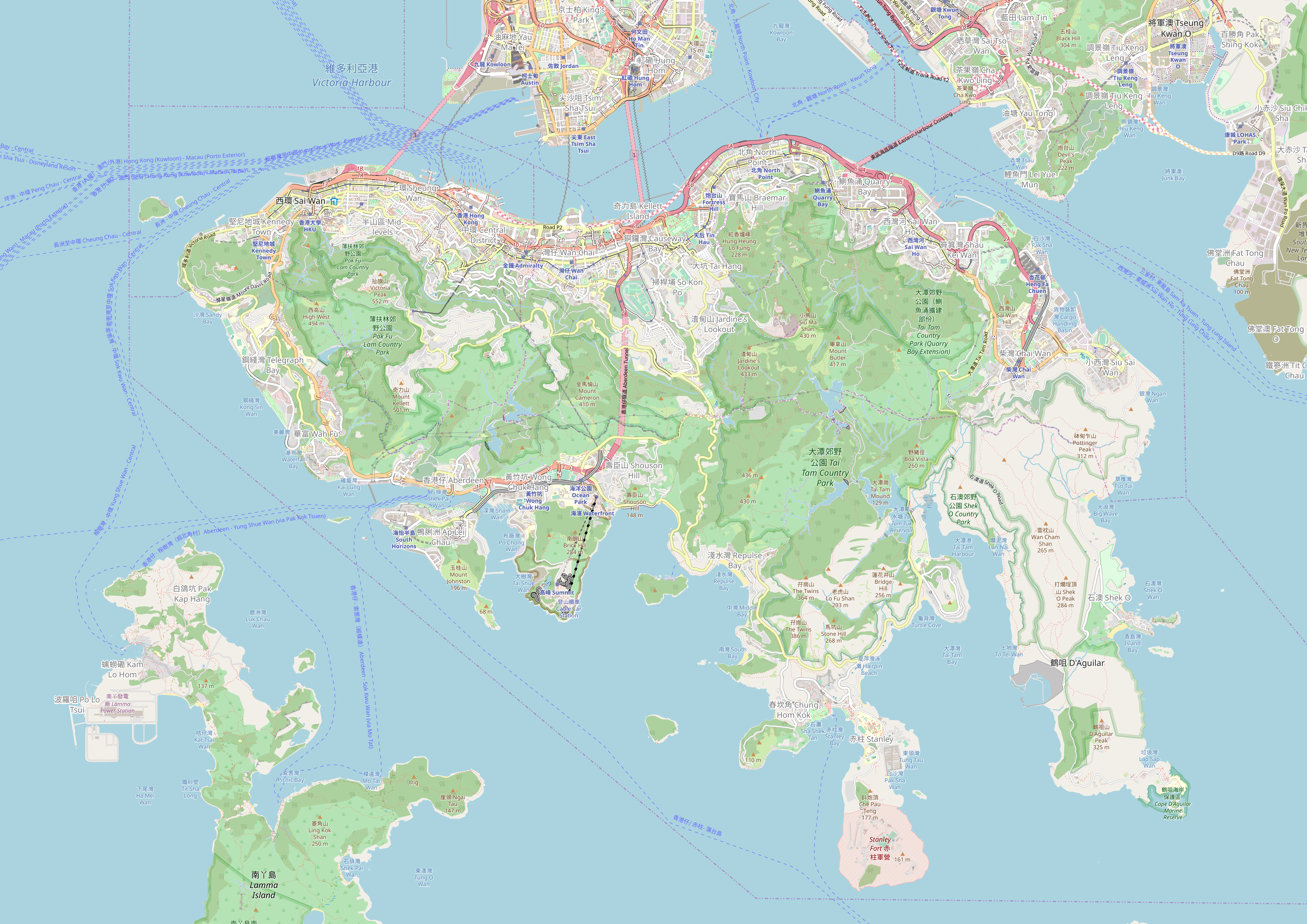
- Location within Hong Kong Island
- Coordinates: 22°13′08″N 114°07′08″E
- Location: Lamma Island, Hong Kong

Dimensions
  - Length: 150 m (490 ft)
- Patrolled by: Leisure and Cultural Services Department

The Hung Shing Yeh Beach (Chinese: 洪聖爺灣泳灘) is a beach on Lamma Island, Hong Kong. It is the most popular beach on Lamma Island. The beach is equipped with toilets, showers and changing rooms. It is also protected by shark net. The beach overlooks the Lamma Power Station.

== History ==
On 11 March 1979, about 100 Vietnamese refugees aboard the Skyluck freighter jumped ship and swam to Lamma Island. About half of them were picked up at sea by police, while the other half mainly landed at Hung Shing Yeh Beach. They were all captured by the police.

The beach building was completed by the Regional Council in 1997/1998. The new structure comprised changing rooms, toilets, a first aid room, a staff office, a catamaran store, a lifeguard lookout, and waste treatment facilities.

== Features ==
- BBQ pits (9 nos.)
- Changing rooms
- Showers and toilets

== Transportation ==
The beach can be reached by walking for about 30 minutes from the Yung Shue Wan Ferry Pier.

== See also ==
- Beaches of Hong Kong
- Lamma Island
