= Upper Cheung Sha Beach =

Beach in Lantau Island, New Territories, Hong Kong

- Beach
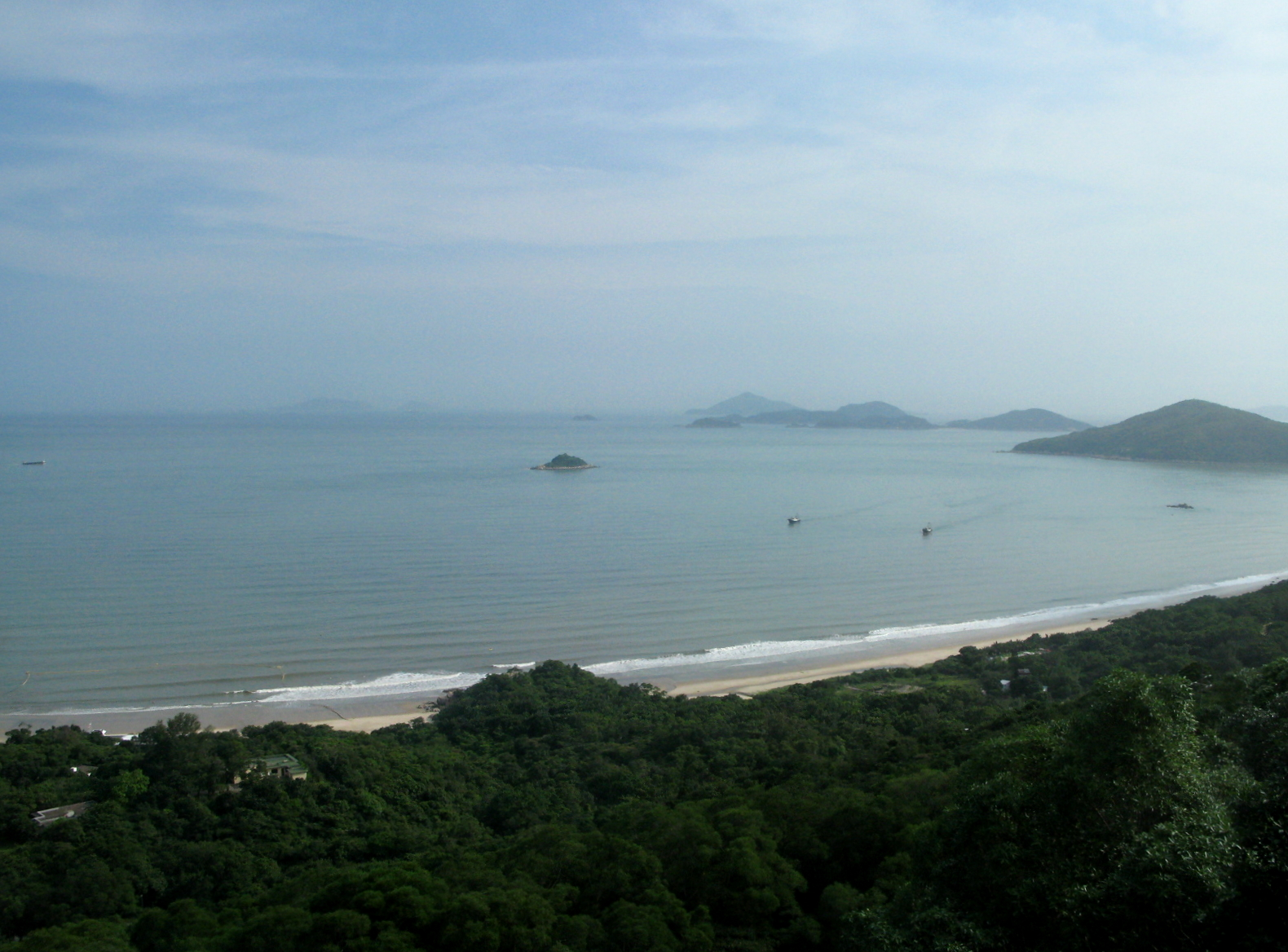
- Upper Cheung Sha Beach

- Location within Hong Kong
- Coordinates: 22.2306°N 113.94134°E
- Location: Cheung Sha, Lantau Island

Dimensions
  - Length: 110 m (360 ft)
- Patrolled by: Leisure and Cultural Services Department

Upper Cheung Sha Beach
- Traditional Chinese: 上長沙泳灘
- Simplified Chinese: 上长沙泳滩
Transcriptions
Standard Mandarin
- Hanyu Pinyin: Shàng Cháng Shā Yǒng Tān
Yue: Cantonese
- Jyutping: soeng5 coeng4 saa1 wing6 taan1

Upper Cheung Sha Beach is a gazetted beach in Cheung Sha in southern Lantau Island, Hong Kong. The beach has barbecue pits and is managed by the Leisure and Cultural Services Department of the Hong Kong Government. The beach is rated as good to fair by the Environmental Protection Department for its water quality in the past twenty years. It is the longest beach in Hong Kong.

== History ==
On 5 June 2015, a body of a woman in her 30s was found floating in the water near the beach. When the marine police and fireboat arrived at the scene, she was pronounced dead.

On 21 November 2018, a carcass of a finless porpoise that had its tail trapped in a fishing net was found by police officers at the beach that caused it to be temporarily closed. The Ocean Park Conservation Foundation had transported the finless porpoise back to Ocean Park for autopsy.

== Usage ==
The beach offers views of Cha Kwo Chau and the Soko Islands.

== Features ==
The beach has the following features:

- BBQ pits (7 nos.)
- Changing rooms
- Showers
- Toilets
- Light refreshment kiosk

== See also ==
- Beaches of Hong Kong
