= San Shek Wan, Lantau South =

Village in Lantau South, Hong Kong

Coordinates: 22.2389749°N 113.9652626°E

San Shek Wan
- Village
- Interactive map of San Shek Wan

San Shek Wan (Chinese: 䃟石灣) is a small village located on Lantau Island, Hong Kong.

On the most prominent hill west of the village itself, is a campsite managed by the Hong Kong Young Women's Christian Association.

The village has a resident population of around 50 people, of which over half are expatriates.

== Administration ==
San Shek Wan is one of the villages represented within the South Lantao Rural Committee. For electoral purposes, San Shek Wan is part of the Lantau constituency, which is currently represented by Randy Yu Hon-kwan.

== Village representatives ==
Only 11 residents, including children, meet the 'indigenous' criteria that has traditionally determined who is allowed to vote for village representatives (the 'Indigenous Inhabitant Representative'), that is men whose families have been in the village since 1889.

Following a 2003 landmark ruling by the Court of Final Appeal, a second village chief (the 'Residents Representative') has been elected by all residents, including indigenous ones. Elections for both posts are held every three years, and voters are only eligible if they have resided in the village for a minimum of three years and hold the right of abode in Hong Kong.

The current village chiefs are Mo Kam-Tong (Indigenous Inhabitant Representative) and Kevin Rushton (Resident Representative).
