= Transport in Hong Kong =

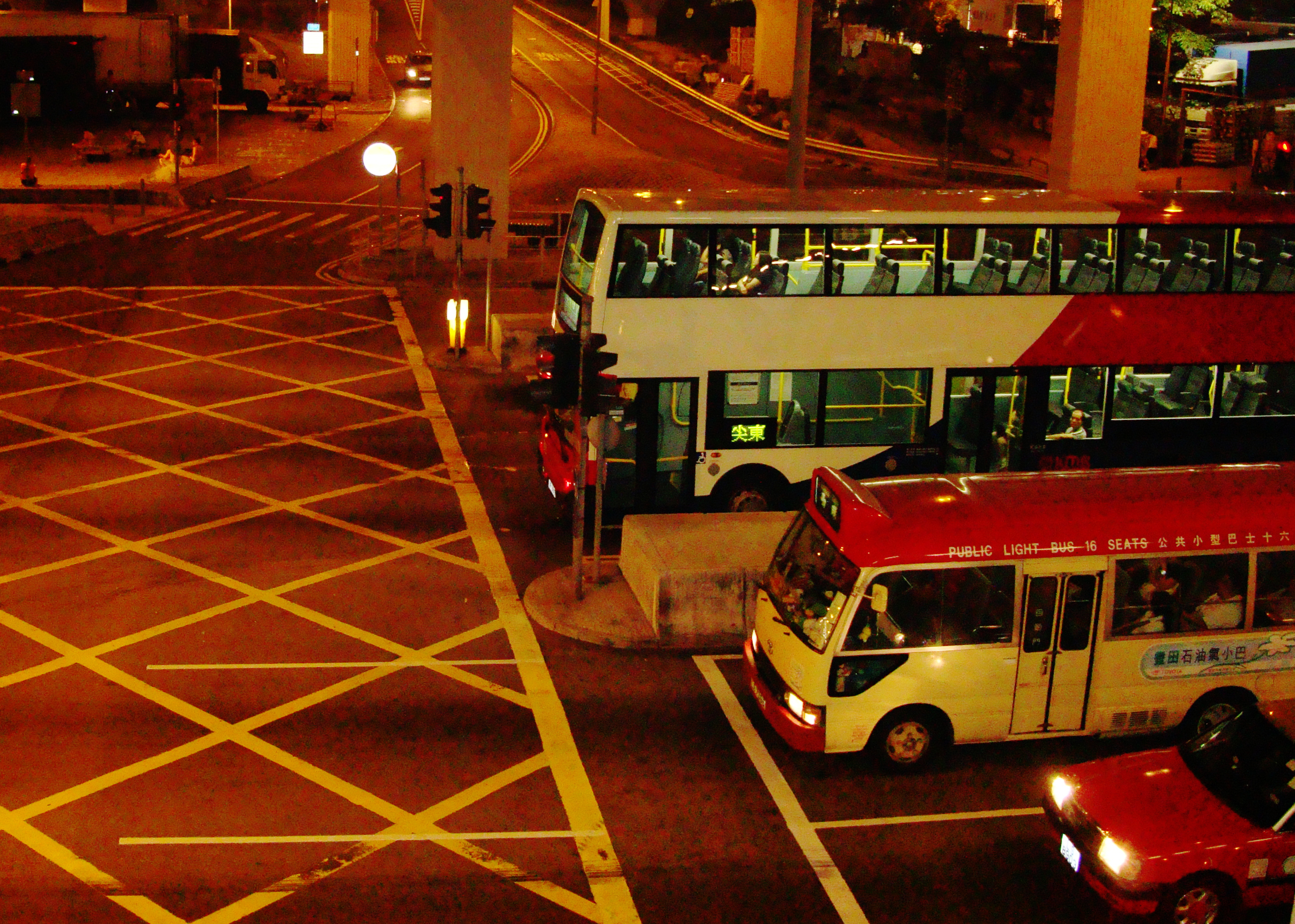
Hong Kong public buses

Hong Kong has a highly developed transport network, encompassing both public and private transport. According to the Hong Kong Government's Travel Characteristics Survey, over 90% of daily journeys are on public transport, the highest rate in the world. However, in 2014, the Transport Advisory Committee issued a report on the worsening congestion problem in Hong Kong and pointed at the excessive growth of private cars over the past 10–15 years.

The Octopus card, a smart electronic money payment system, was introduced in September 1997 to provide an alternative to traditional banknotes and coins. Available for purchase and renewal in every stop of the Mass Transit Railway (MTR) system and at a select few ferry customer service centers, the Octopus card is a non-touch payment system which allows payment not only for public transport (such as trains, buses, trams, ferries and minibuses), but also at parking meters, convenience stores, supermarkets, select restaurants and most vending machines.

== Public transport statistics ==
The average amount of time people spend commuting with public transit in Hong Kong, for example to and from work, on a weekday is 73 min. 21% of public transit riders ride for more than 2 hours every day. The average amount of time people wait at a stop or station for public transit is 14 min, while 19% of riders wait for over 20 minutes on average during their commutes every day. The average distance people usually ride in a single trip with public transit is 11.2 km, while 31% travel for over 12 km in a single direction.

== Rail transport ==
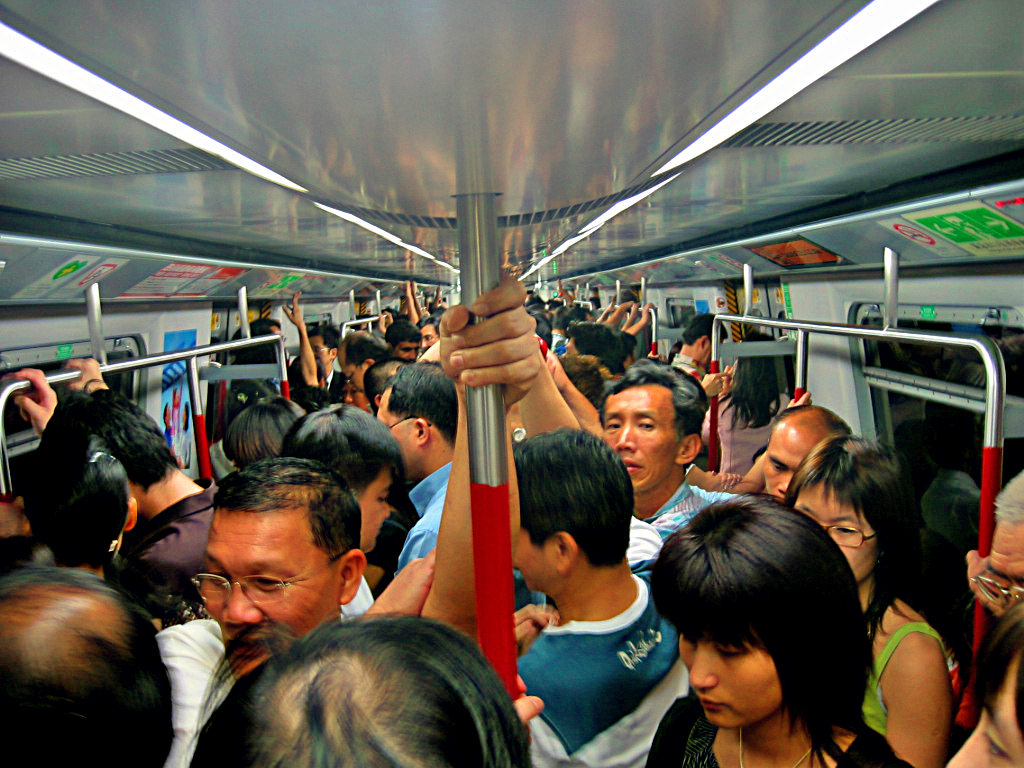
Inside an MTR Tsuen Wan line train compartment during peak hours

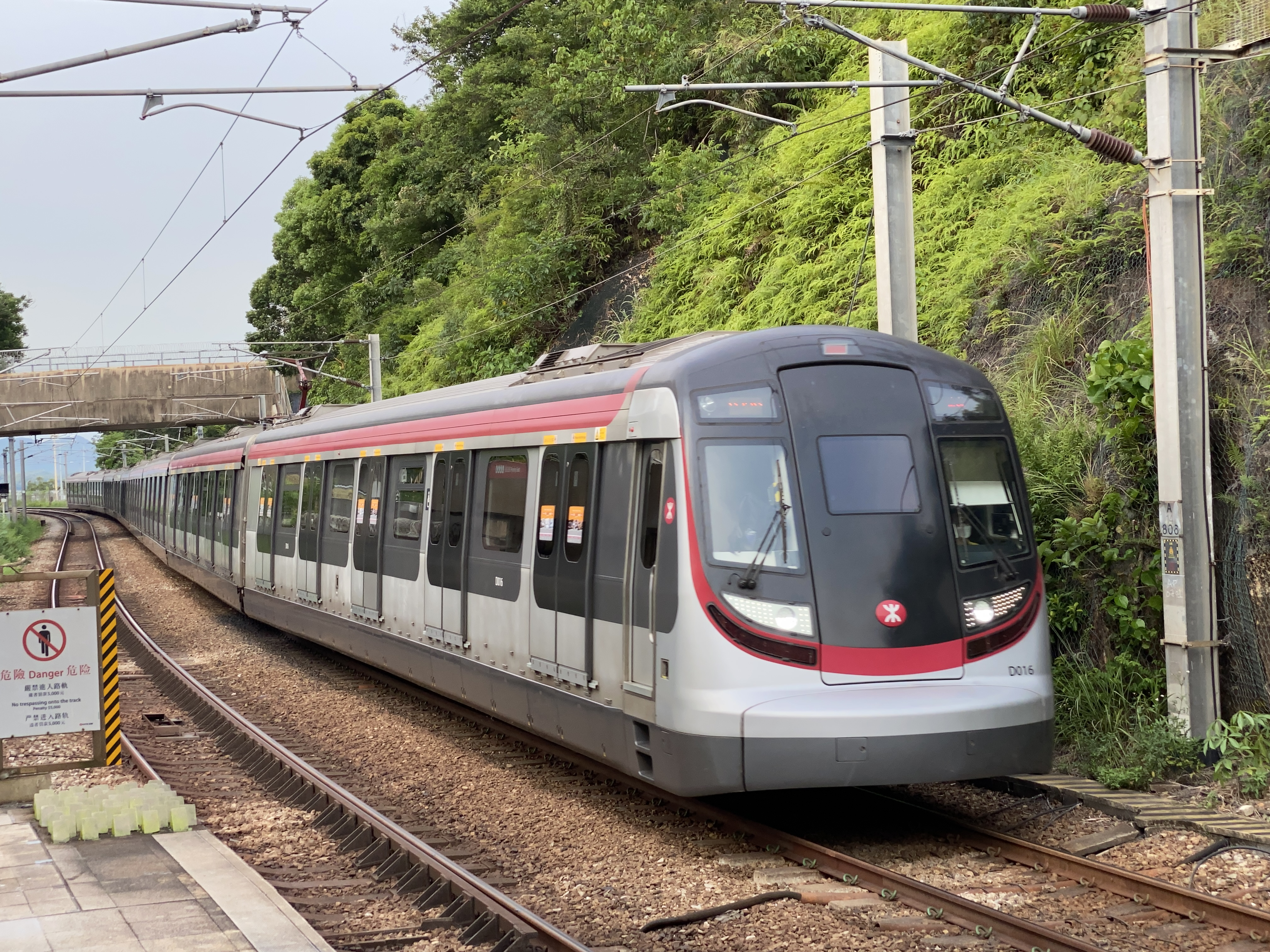
A train at University station of the MTR East Rail line. This train, the Hyundai Rotem EMU, replaced all prior rolling stock on the East Rail line.

Hong Kong has an extensive railway network, and the Hong Kong Government has long established that the public transit system has the "railway as its backbone". Public transport trains are operated by the MTR Corporation. The MTR operates the metro network within inner urban Hong Kong, Kowloon Peninsula and the northern part of Hong Kong Island with newly developed areas, Tsuen Wan, Tseung Kwan O, Tung Chung, Hong Kong Disneyland, the Hong Kong International Airport, the northeastern and northwestern parts of the New Territories. The Hong Kong Tramways operates a tram service exclusively on northern Hong Kong Island. The Peak Tram connects Central, Hong Kong's central business district, with Victoria Peak.

=== Mass Transit Railway ===
Opened in 1979, the system now includes 240.6 km (149.5 mi) of rail with 167 stations, including 98 railway stations and 68 light rail stops. The railway lines include the East Rail, Kwun Tong, Tsuen Wan, Island, Tung Chung, Tseung Kwan O, Tuen Ma, South Island, the Airport Express and the Disneyland Resort lines. Eight of the lines provide general metro services, whereas the Airport Express provides a direct link from the Hong Kong International Airport into the city center, and the Disneyland Resort Line exclusively takes passengers to and from Hong Kong Disneyland.

The Light Rail possesses many characteristics of a tramway, including running on streets with other traffic (at grade) on most of its tracks and providing services for the public in the northwestern New Territories, including Tuen Mun and Yuen Long.

All trains and underground MTR stations are air-conditioned.

=== Tramways ===
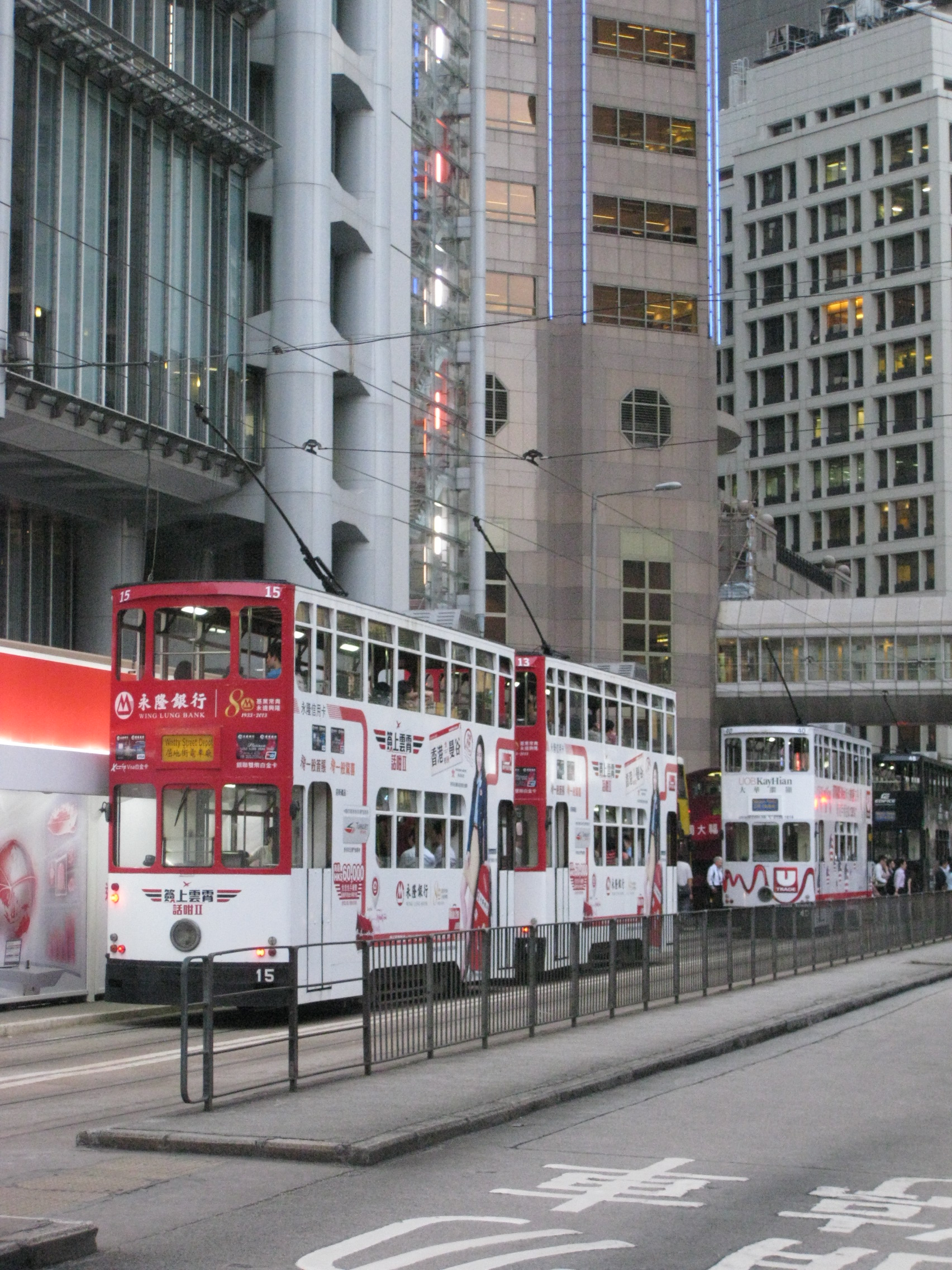
Trams next to the HSBC Building in Central

The Hong Kong Tramways is the tram system run exclusively with double deckers. The electric tram system was proposed in 1881; however nobody was willing to invest in a system at the time. In August 1901, the Second Tramway Bill was introduced and passed into law as the 1902 Tramway Ordinance. Hong Kong Tramway Electric Company Limited, a British company, was authorised to take the responsibilities in construction and daily operation. In 1904, the tram system first got into service. It was soon taken over by another company, Electric Tranction Company of Hong Kong Limited and then the name was changed to Hong Kong Tramways Company Limited in 1910.

The rail system is 13 kilometres (8.1 mi) long, with a total track length of 30 km (19 mi), and it runs together with other vehicles on the street. Its operation relies on the 550V direct current (d.c.) from the overhead cables, on 3'6" gauge (1067 mm) tracks. The trams provide service to only parts of Hong Kong Island: they run on a double track along the northern coast of Hong Kong Island from Kennedy Town to Shau Kei Wan, with a single clockwise-running track of about 3 kilometres (1.9 mi) around Happy Valley Racecourse.

=== Funicular railways ===
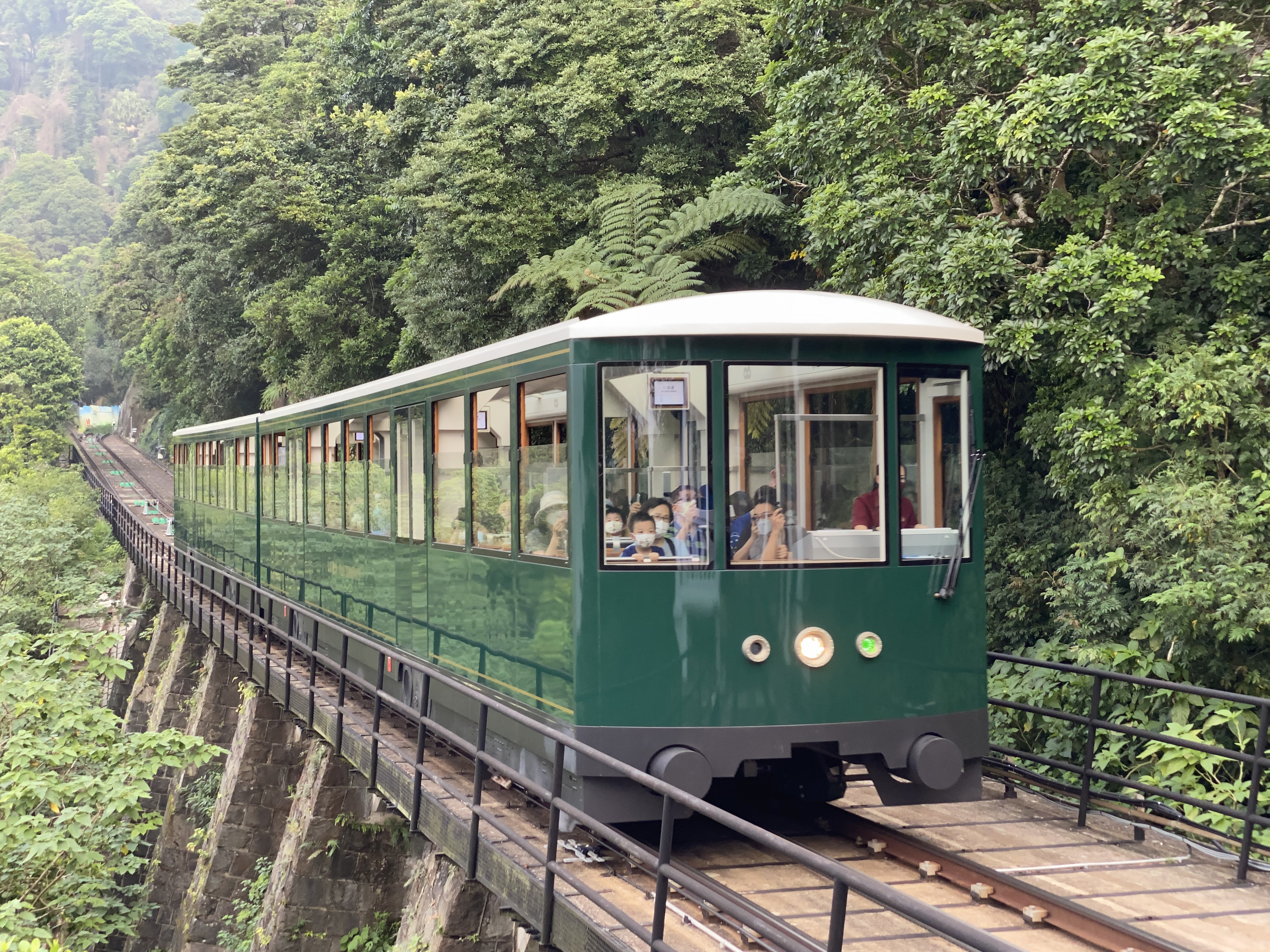
The Peak Tram

There are two funicular railway services in Hong Kong:

- The Peak Tram carries both tourists and residents to the upper levels of Hong Kong Island. It provides the most direct route to Victoria Peak and offers scenic views over Victoria Harbour and the skyscrapers of Hong Kong. It was inaugurated in 1888.
- The Ocean Express operates within the paid area of the Ocean Park theme park. It links two parts of the park, operating entirely in a tunnel. The ride is themed, and uses multimedia effects to simulate the feeling of travelling into the depths of the sea. It was opened in 2009.

=== Airport people-mover system ===
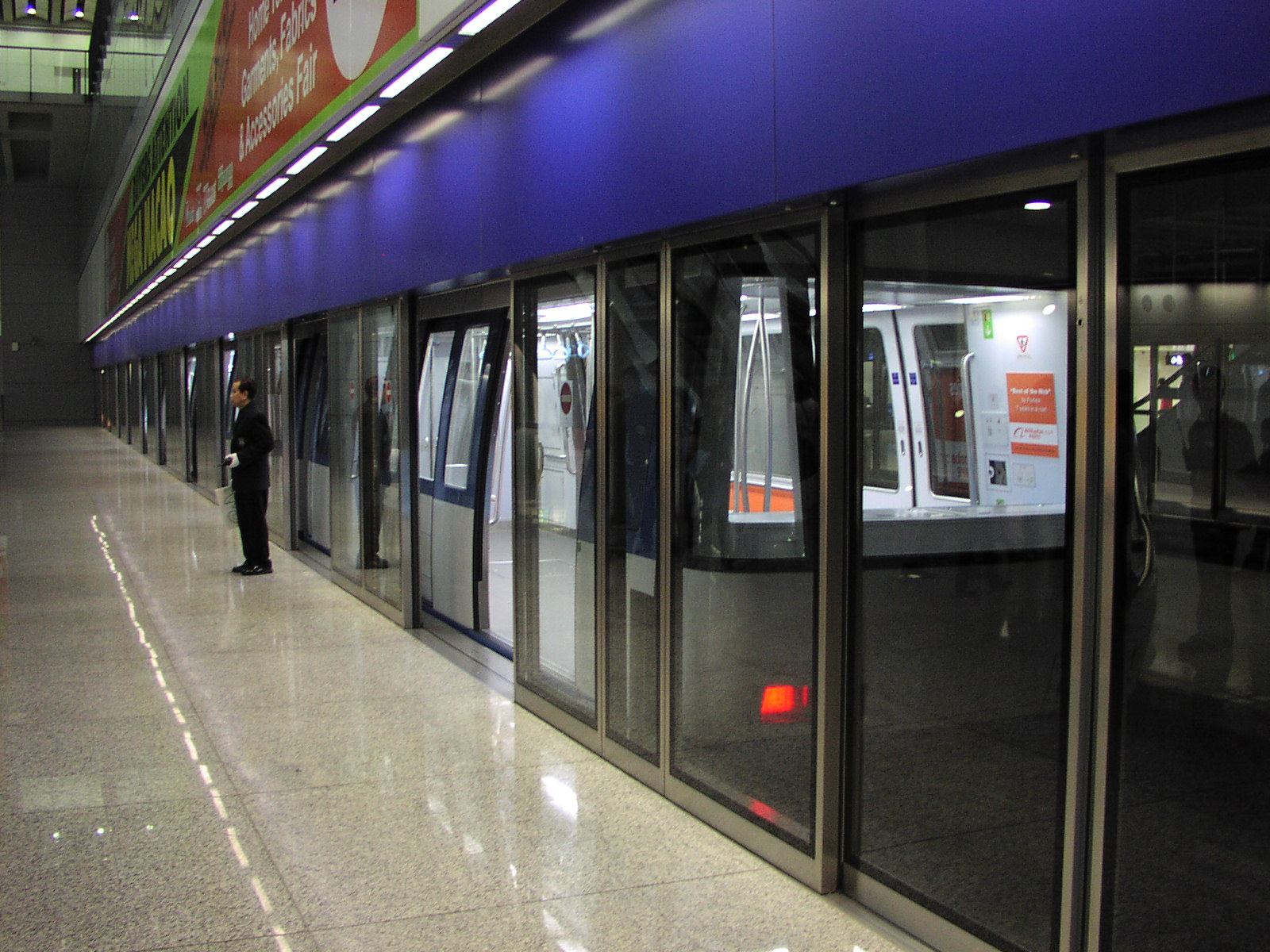
The platform of the Hong Kong International Airport Automated People Mover

The Hong Kong International Airport Automated People Mover is a driverless people-mover system located within the Hong Kong International Airport in Chek Lap Kok. It operates in two "segments". For departures, the train runs from Terminal 2 to the East Hall to the West Hall. For arrivals, the train runs only from the West Hall to the East Hall, where all passengers must disembark for immigration, customs, and baggage claim. Operation of the first segment commenced in 1998, and the operation of the second segment commenced in early-2007. The HKIA APM is being extended to the Terminal 2 Concourse, which is being constructed and will be finished by 2026.

There is another system between the terminals. There is also a travellator which can be used.

=== Cross-border trains ===
Inter-city train services crossing the Hong Kong-China boundary are known as Intercity Through Trains. They are jointly operated by Hong Kong's MTR Corporation and China Railway High-speed. Hung Hom station (formerly called Kowloon station) and West Kowloon Terminus are the stations in Hong Kong where passengers can catch these trains. Passengers have to go through immigration and customs before boarding. There are currently four through train routes:

- Between Hong Kong and Beijing (Beijing–Kowloon through train)
- Between Hong Kong and Shanghai (Shanghai–Kowloon through train)
- Between Hong Kong and Guangzhou (Guangzhou–Kowloon through train)
- Between Hong Kong and Guangzhou (Guangzhou–Shenzhen–Hong Kong Express Rail Link) (XRL)
- In Hong Kong West Kowloon Station, there is the Mainland Port Area

In 2024, Hung Hom cross-border trains are halted.

== Road transport ==
=== Buses ===
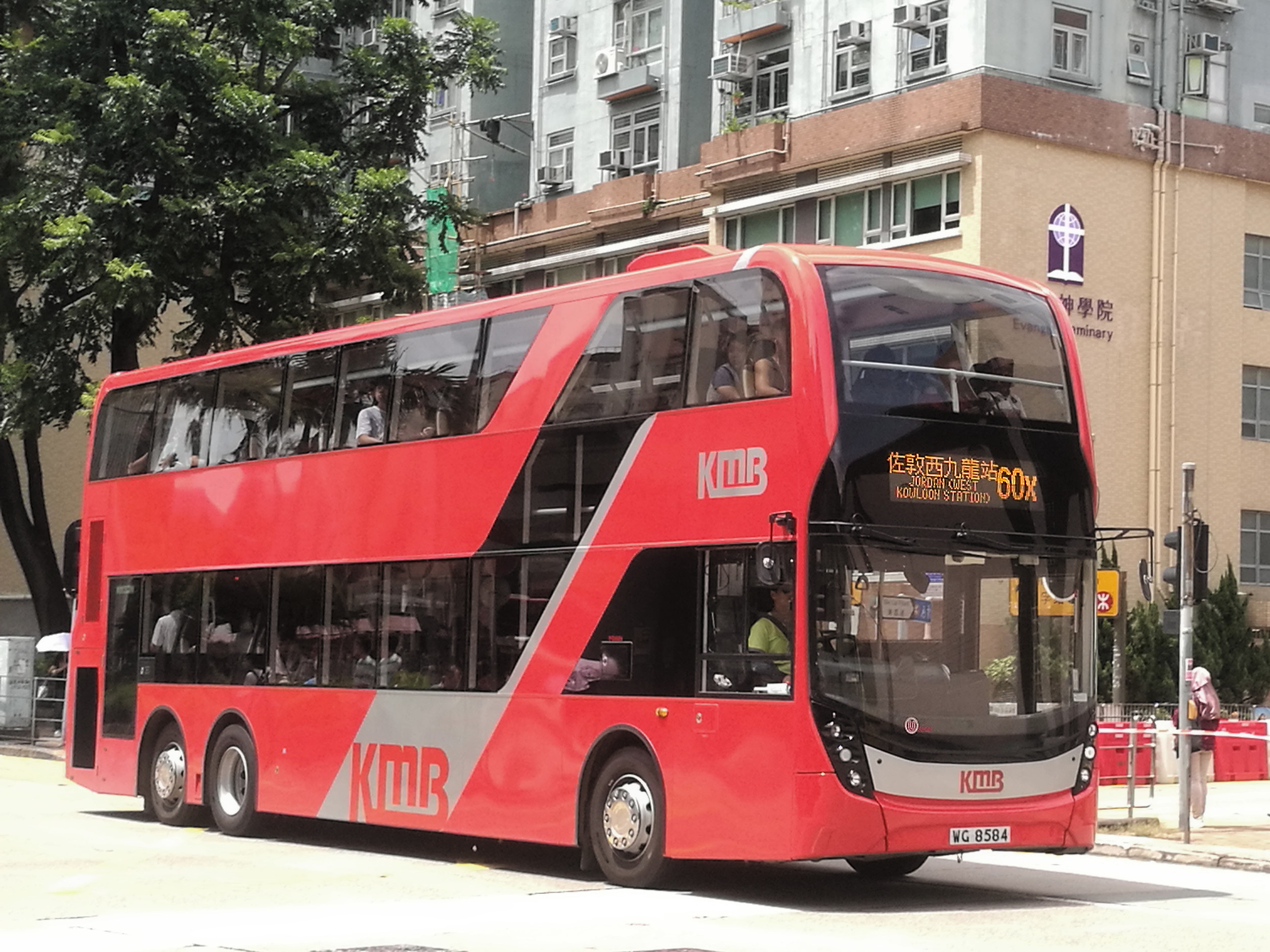
A low-floor double-decker bus with wheelchair accessibility

Bus services have a long history in Hong Kong. As of 2023, four companies operate franchised public bus services, each granted ten-year exclusive operating rights to the set of routes that they operate. Franchise buses altogether carry about one-third of the total daily public transport market of around 12,000,000 passengers, with KMB having 67% of the franchised bus market share and Citybus with 29%. There are also a variety of non-franchised public buses services, including feeder bus services to railway stations operated by the railway companies, and residents' services for residential estates (particularly those in the New Territories).

The four franchised bus companies are:

- Kowloon Motor Bus Company (1933) Limited;
- Citybus Limited;
- Long Win Bus Company Limited; and
- New Lantao Bus Company (1973) Limited.

Founded in 1933, the Kowloon Motor Bus Company (1933) Limited (KMB) is one of the largest privately owned public bus operators in the world. KMB's fleet consist of about 3,900 buses on 400 routes and a staff of over 12,000 people. In 1979, Citybus began its operations in Hong Kong with one double-decker, providing shuttle service for the Hong Kong dockyard. It later expanded into operating a residential bus route between City One, Sha Tin and Kowloon Tong MTR station. New World First Bus Services Limited was established in 1998, taking over China Motor Bus's franchise to provide bus services on Hong Kong Island together with Citybus. NWFB's owner company later bought Citybus, and NWFB and Citybus shared the same website, but the two companies had essentially been operating independently until their merger on 1 July 2023.

=== Public light buses ===
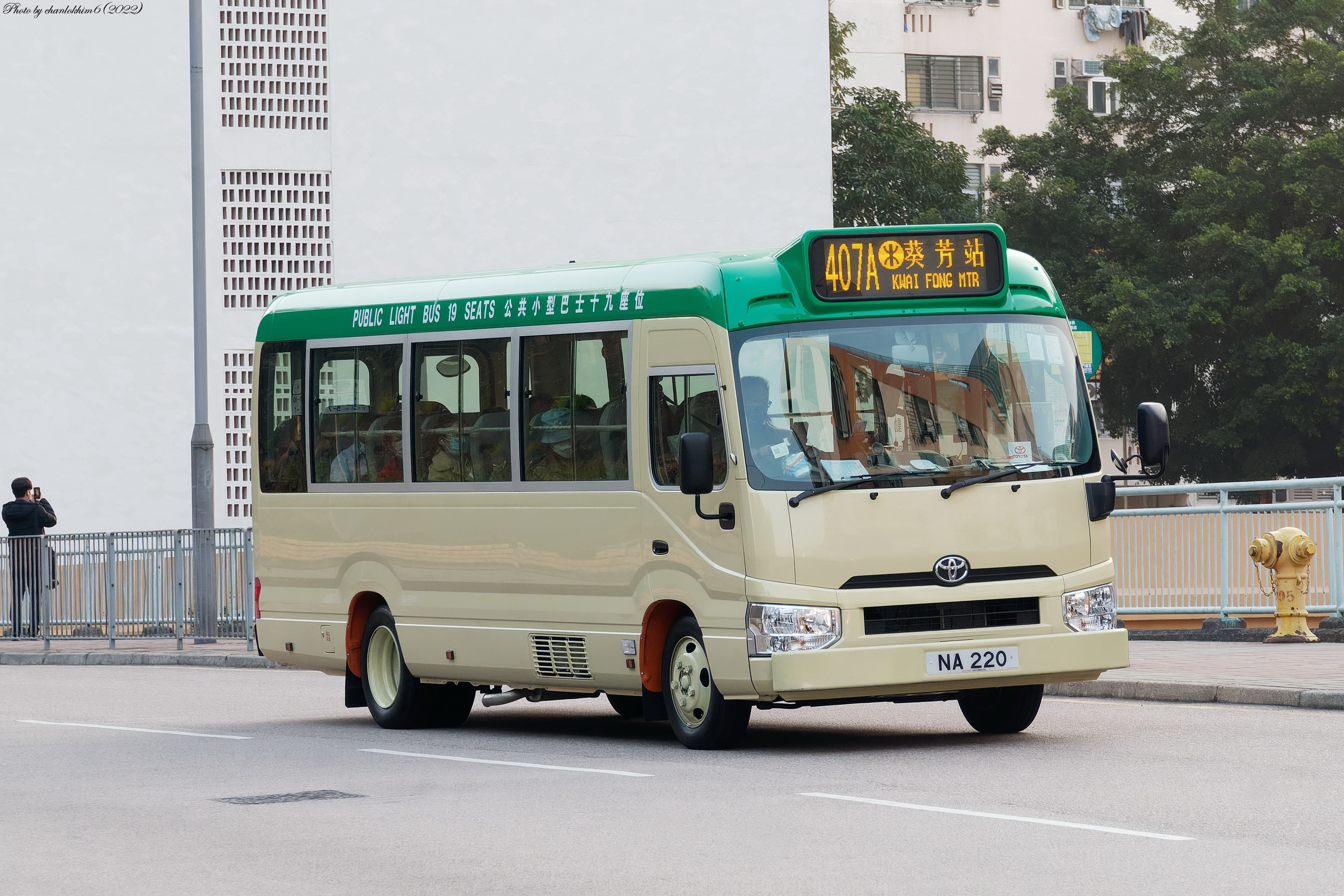
Green minibus

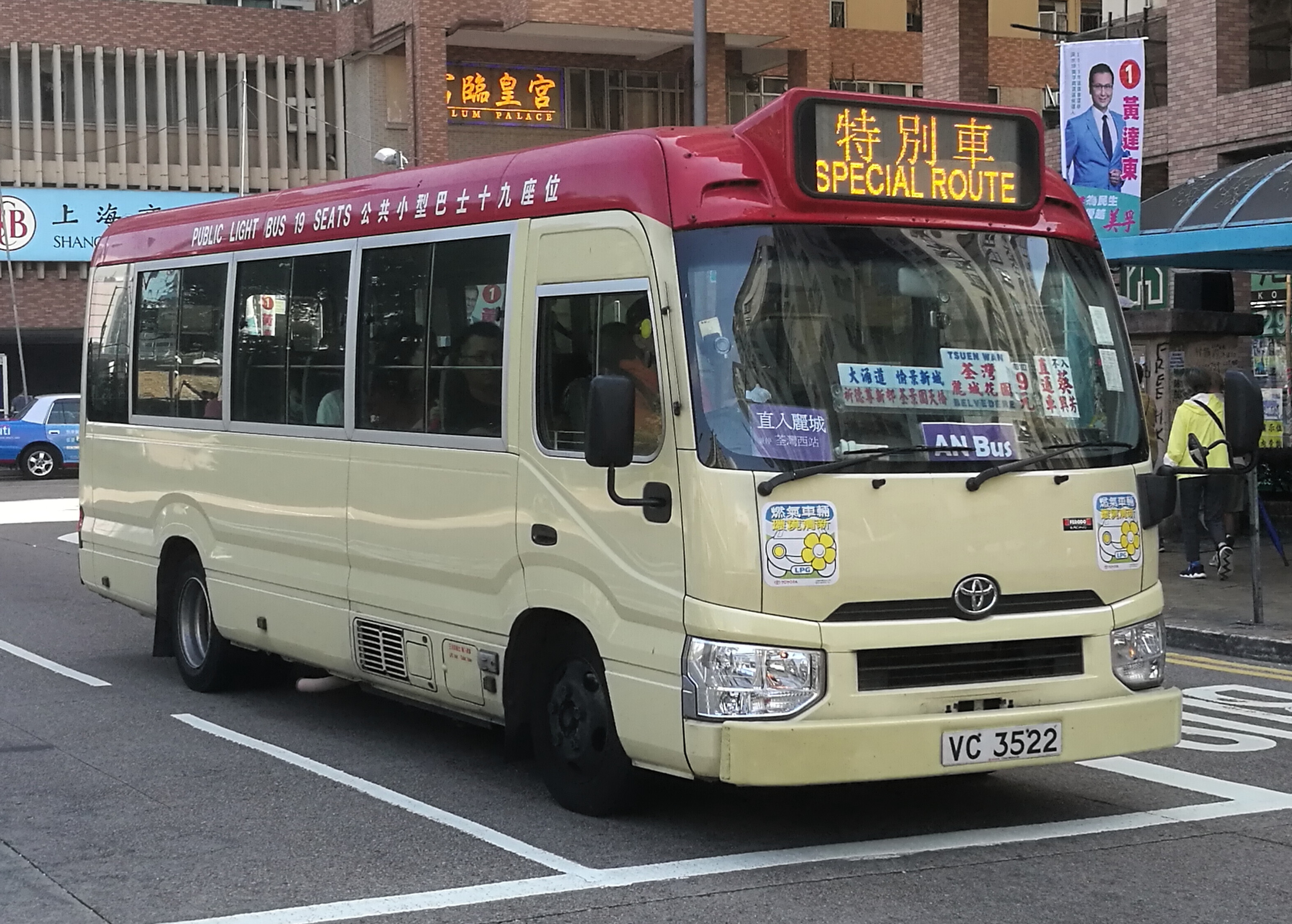
Red minibus

Public light buses (小巴) (widely referred to as minibuses, or sometimes maxicabs, a de facto share taxi) run the length and breadth of Hong Kong, through areas which the standard bus lines can not or do not reach as frequently, quickly or directly. Minibuses carry a maximum of 16 (19 for some routes since 2017) passengers; standing is not permitted.

The Hong Kong Transport Department (HKTD) allows and licenses the operation of two types of public light buses:

1. green minibuses that have route numbers, stop at designated stops (many routes have hail and ride sections along which passengers can board and exit anywhere unless it is a no-stopping zone) and which have their fares, service and frequency regulated by the HKTD; and
2. red minibuses that may or may not have regular routes, may or may not be numbered, may or may not have fixed stops and whose fares and service levels are not regulated by HKTD.

Red minibuses often provide more convenient transport for passengers not served by green minibuses or other public buses, and are thus quite popular. Where green minibus drivers are paid fixed wages to drive their routes, red minibus drivers often rely on their fares for a living and thus are often seen to be more aggressive drivers. The prevalence of aggressive driving has resulted in the Transport Department making it mandatory for Hong Kong minibuses to be equipped with large read-out speedometers which allow passengers to track the speed at which minibus drivers operate. Currently, if minibuses exceed 80 km/h, the speedometer will sound an audible warning signal to the driver and passengers. If the minibus exceeds 100 km/h, the beeping will turn into a sustained tone.

The Transport Department has also regulated, after a series of minibus accidents, that all new minibuses brought into service after August 2005 must have seat belts installed, and passengers must use seat belts when they are provided.

=== Taxis ===
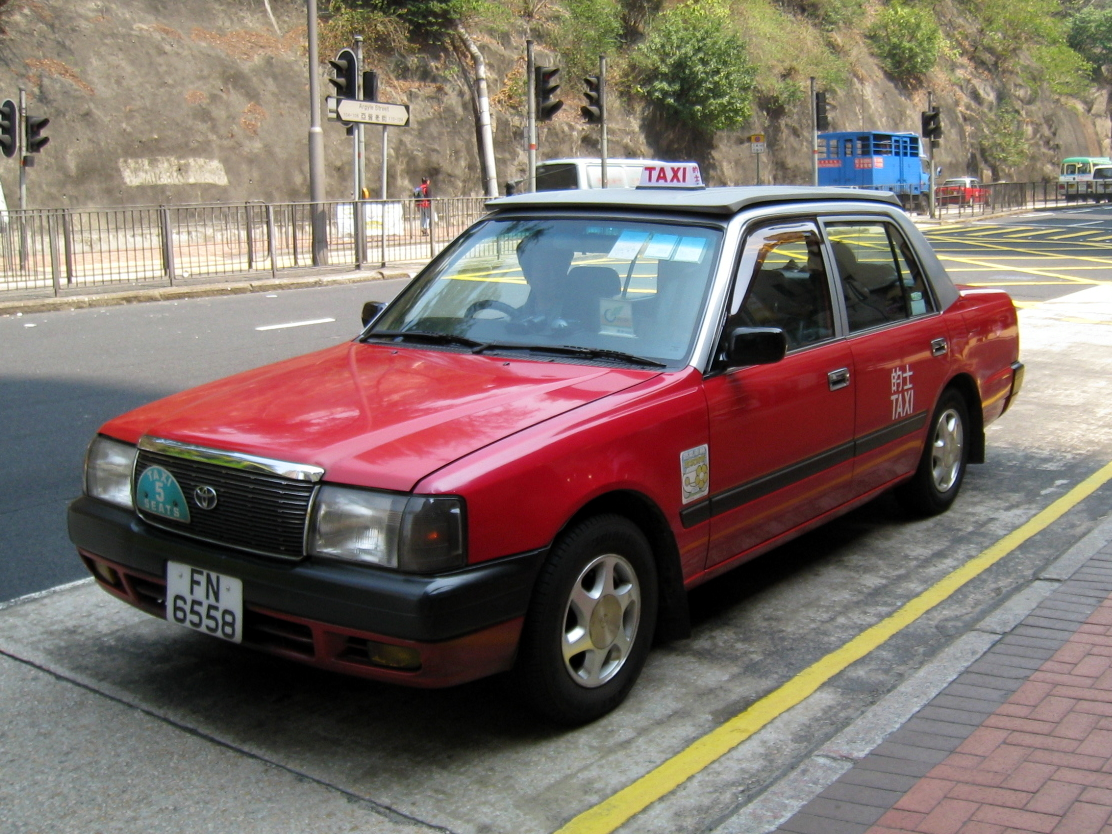
Red taxis serve urban areas.

As of March 2016, there were 18,138 taxis in Hong Kong, operating in three distinct (but slightly overlapping) geographical areas, and distinguished by their colour. Of these, 15,250 are red urban taxis, 2,838 green New Territories taxis, and 50 blue Lantau taxis. Every day, they serve 1,100,000, 207,900, and 1,400 passengers respectively. Taxis carry an average of 1,000,000 passengers each day, occupying about 12% of the daily patronage carried by all modes of public transport in Hong Kong.

List of Hong Kong Taxis
	Colour	District
Urban taxis	Red	Hong Kong Island, Kowloon, Sha Tin, Kwai Chung
New Territories taxis	Dark Green	Tai Po, Fanling, Sheung Shui, Yuen Long, Tuen Mun
Lantau taxis	Light Blue	Tung Chung, Mui Wo, Tai O, Ngong Ping, Disneyland

Most of the taxis in Hong Kong run on LPG (liquified petroleum gas) to reduce emissions. In August 2000, a one-off grant was paid in cash to taxi owners who replaced their diesel taxi with an LPG one. Since August 2001, all newly purchased taxis run on LPG. By the end of 2003, over 99.8% of the taxi fleet in Hong Kong ran on LPG.

Taxi fares are charged according to the taximeter; however, additional charges on the fare table may apply, such as road tolls and luggage fees. Urban taxis are the most expensive, while Lantau taxis are the cheapest. The standard of service among different kinds of taxis is mostly the same. The reason for having three types of taxis is to ensure service availability in less populated regions, as running in the urban centre is considered to be more profitable.

=== Private cars ===
As of December 2024, the Census and Statistics Department of Hong Kong reports that there are 578,001 licensed vehicles in Hong Kong. In terms of private car ownership, the number of cars per capita is half that of Singapore and one-third that of Taiwan. However, the Transport Advisory Committee, which advises the government on transport policies, issued a report stating that the growth of private cars is too fast and must be contained so as to alleviate congestion problems of Hong Kong. Private cars are most popular in newly developed areas such as New Territories and Lantau and areas near the border with mainland China, as there are fewer public transportation options, and more parking spaces compared to other areas of Hong Kong.

Most cars are right-hand drive models, from Japanese or European manufacturers. Almost all private vehicles in Hong Kong have dual airbags and are tested by JNCAP. Vehicles must also be maintained to a high standard, contrary to mainland China regulations. Hong Kong does not allow left-hand drive vehicles to be primarily registered in Hong Kong. However, Hong Kong registered vehicles may apply for secondary mainland Chinese registration plates, and these can be driven across the border to mainland China; likewise, left-hand drive cars seen in Hong Kong are usually primarily registered in mainland China and carry supplementary Hong Kong registration plates.

Cars are subjected to a first-time registration tax, which varies from 35% to over 100%, based on the size and value of the car. The level of vehicle taxation was increased by a law passed on 2 June 1982 to discourage private car ownership, and also as an incentive to buy smaller, more efficient cars, as these have less tax levied on them. First-time registration tax was doubled, annual licensing fees were increased by 300%, and $0.70 duty fee was imposed on each litre of light oils.

In addition to the heavy traffic at times, parking may be problematic. Due to high urban density, there are not many filling stations; petrol in Hong Kong averages around US$3.96 per litre, of which over half the cost is taxes. It was suggested in the news that the government had deliberately impeded the use of new environmentally friendly diesel engines by allowing only light goods vehicles to be fuelled by diesel. While it cannot be determined why exactly the government does not allow private cars to be fuelled by diesel, it has been pointed out that the government does receive a tax that is 150% of the actual fuel cost. This is mostly to discourage car ownership for environmental reasons.

There is a waiting list for local driving tests, while a full (private car) driving licence valid for ten years costs around US$115. Residents of Hong Kong holding licences issued by other Chinese authorities and some foreign countries can get a Hong Kong driving licence exempt from tests if they can adequately show that they obtained their licence while residing in the place concerned (common proofs are school transcripts or employer's documentation). Some private car owners, known as white card drivers, provide a taxi service for a nominal fee.

=== Bicycles ===
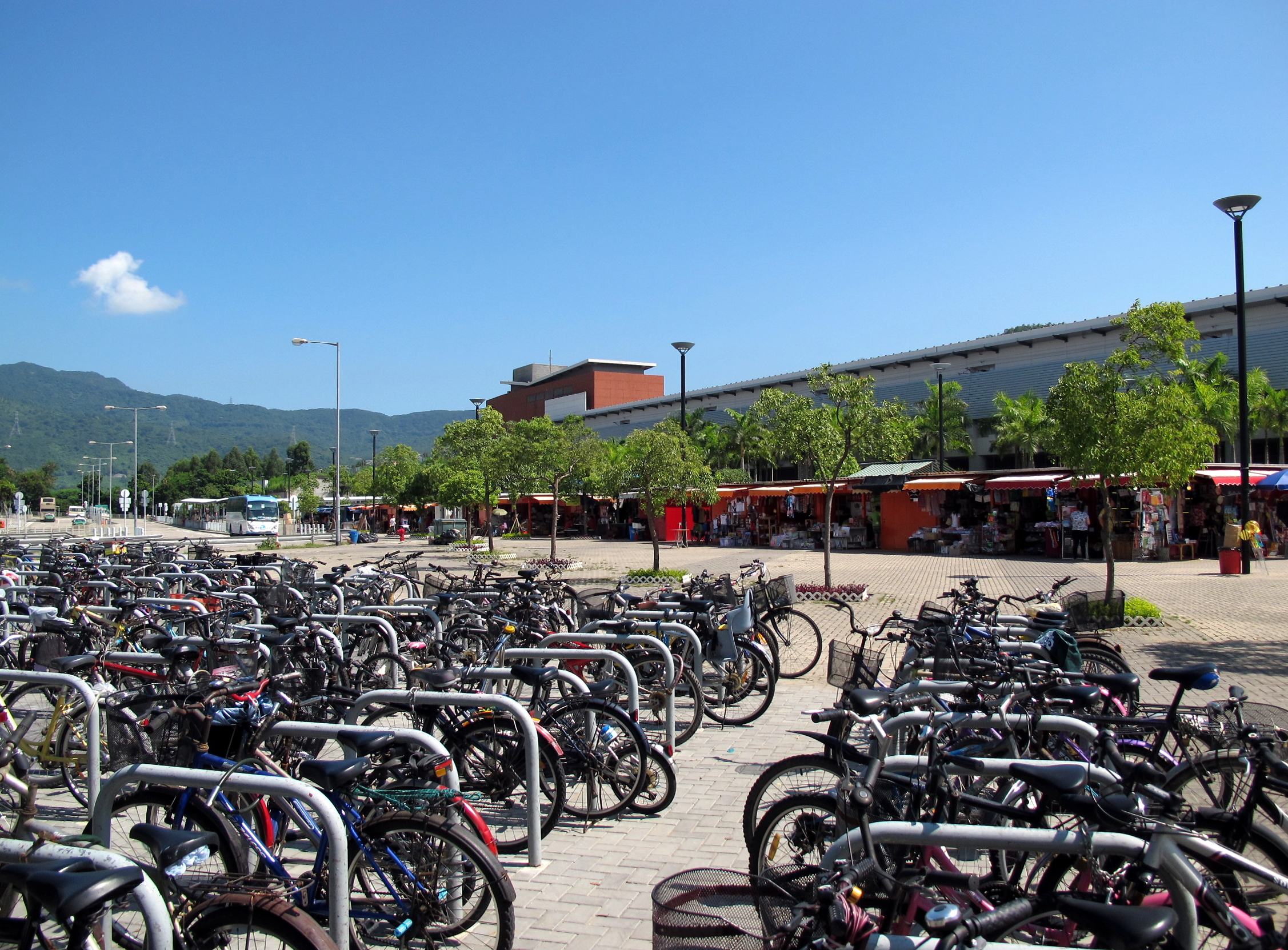
Bicycle parking at Kam Sheung Road station

Cycling is a popular means of transport in many parts of the New Territories, where new towns such as Sha Tin, Tai Po and Sheung Shui have significant cycle track networks. In the auto congested urban areas of Hong Kong and Kowloon, cycling is less common, despite the relatively flat topography of populated areas, in part because it is government policy not to support cycling as part of the transportation system. In 2011, the MTR Corporation announced that bicycles were permitted to be taken on all MTR rail lines.

=== Motorcycles ===
Motorcycles by the private users in Hong Kong urban districts are not as popular as in South East Asian countries like Vietnam. They are mostly used for commercial and business purposes.

=== Cross-border buses ===
A large number of buses leave various parts of Hong Kong (usually from side streets and hotel entrances) to various cities in the Pearl River Delta, Shenzhen and Guangzhou.

Miniature Golf Carts

On some of the outlying islands, such as Lamma Island, residents rely on miniature golf carts for transportation. These compact electric vehicles serve as an efficient mode of transport for short distances and are a unique sight on the island's narrow pathways.

== Maritime transport ==
=== Ferries ===
==== Internal routes ====
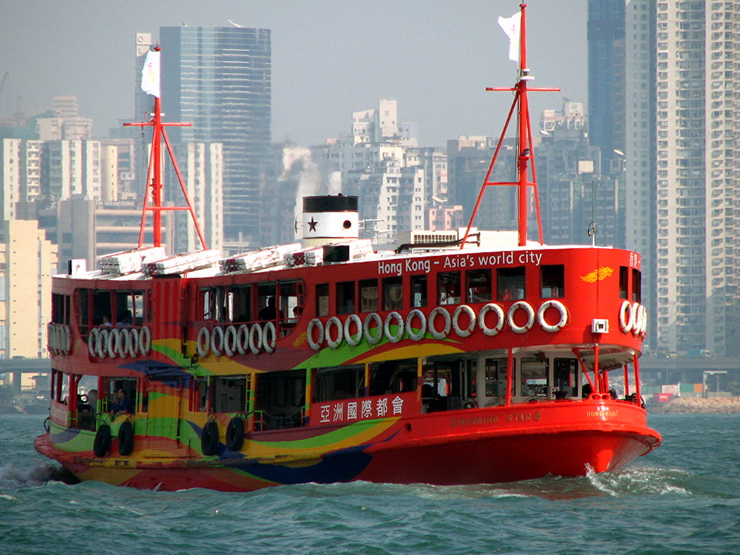
A Star Ferry carries passengers across Victoria Harbour. This particular one is painted with an advertisement that promotes Hong Kong as Asia's World City.

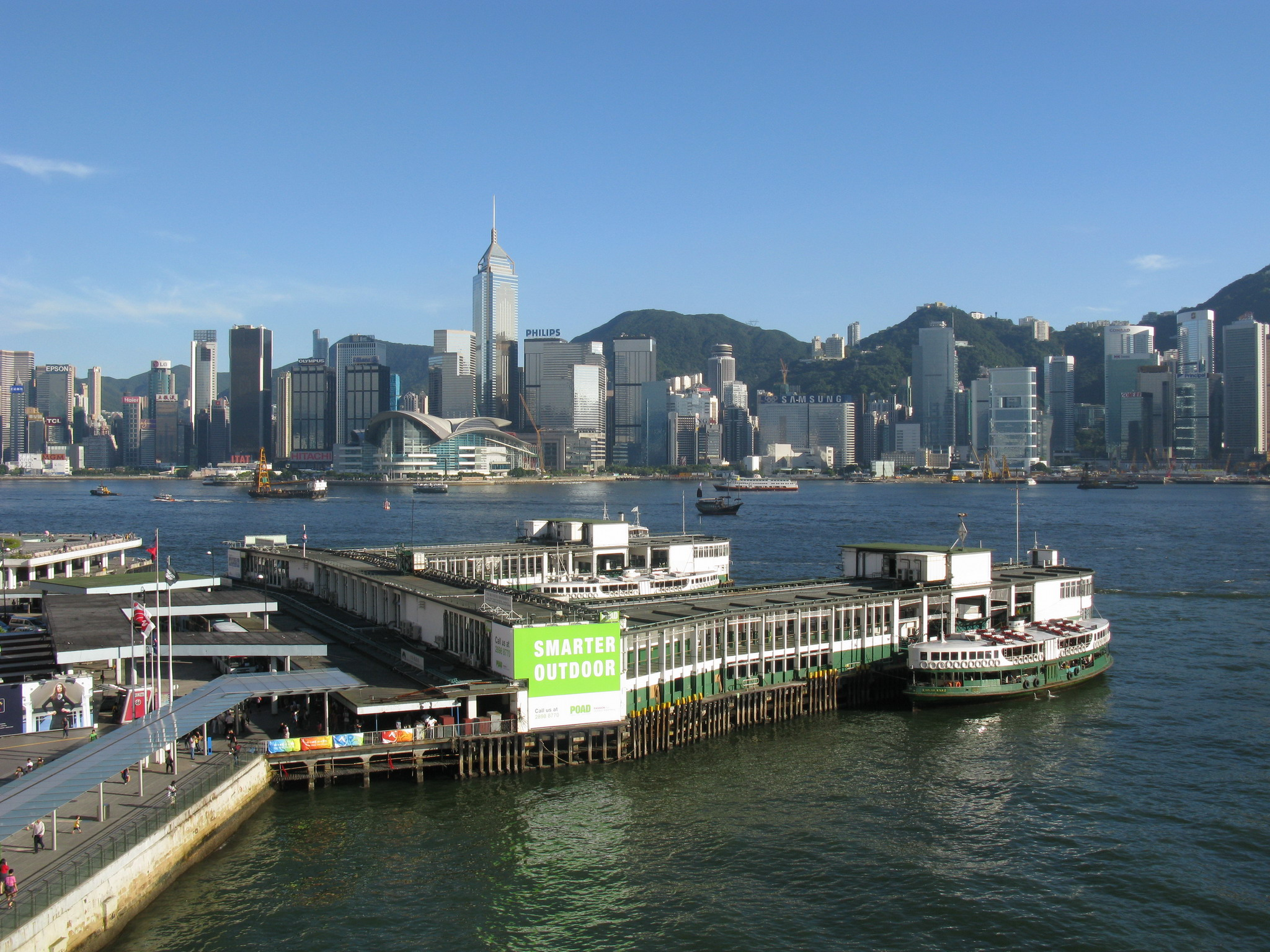
Tsim Sha Tsui Pier, a pier for Star Ferry services

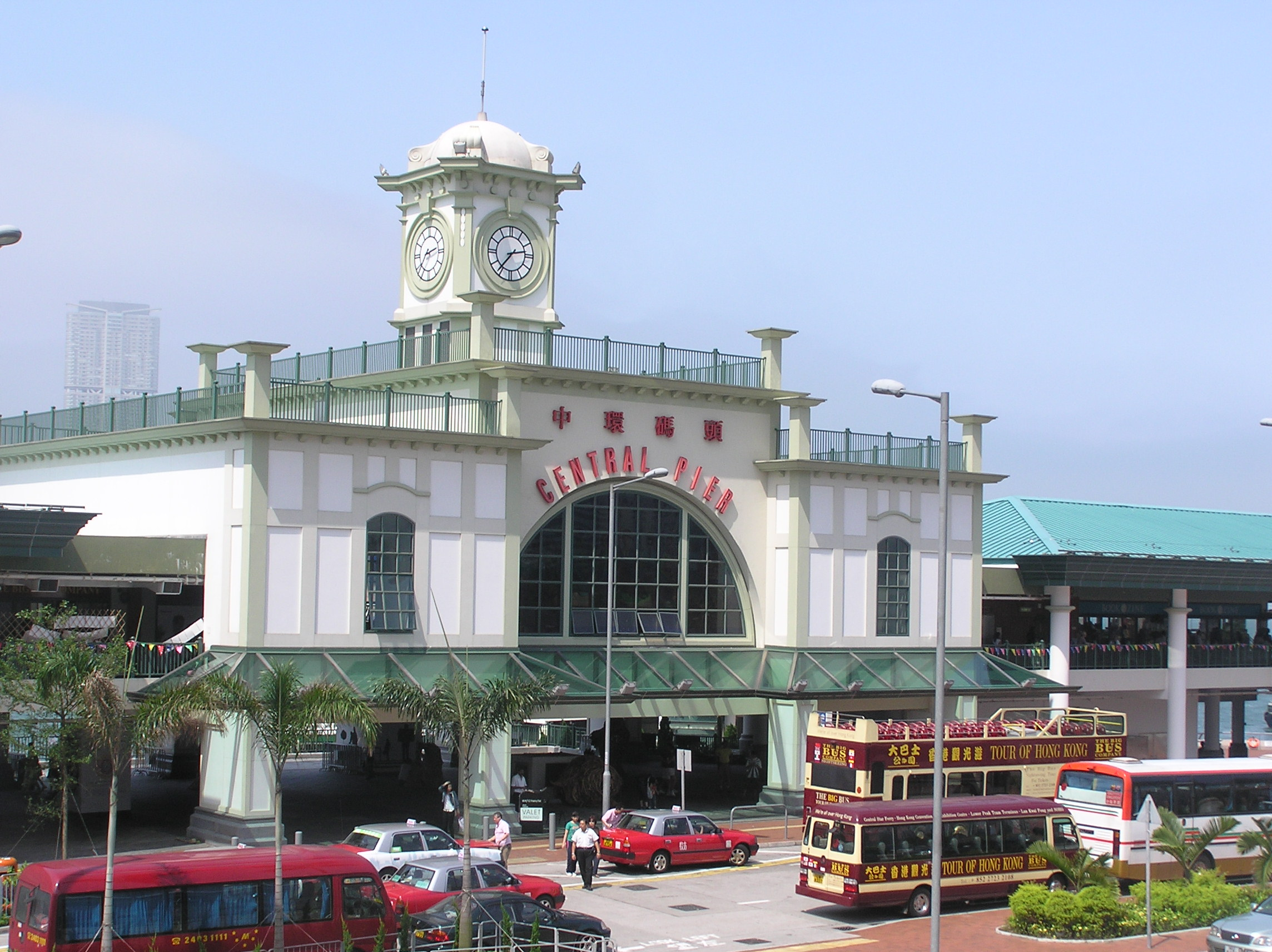
The Star Ferry Pier in Central

Most ferry services are provided by licensed ferry operators. As of September 2003, there were 27 regular licensed passenger ferry services operated by 11 licensees, serving outlying islands, new towns and inner-Victoria Harbour. Two of the routes operated by the Star Ferry are franchised. Additionally, 78 "kai-to" ferries are licensed to serve remote coastal settlements.

The following companies operate ferry services in Hong Kong:

Star Ferry:

- Central to Tsim Sha Tsui
- Wan Chai to Tsim Sha Tsui
- Harbour Tour (Loop between Tsim Sha Tsui, Central, Wan Chai, and Hung Hom)

Sun Ferry:

- Central to Cheung Chau
- Central to Mui Wo
- Peng Chau, Mui Wo, Chi Ma Wan, and Cheung Chau
- North Point to Hung Hom
- North Point to Kowloon City

Hong Kong & Kowloon Ferry:

- Lamma Island to Central
- Central to Peng Chau
- Peng Chau to Hei Ling Chau

Chuen Kee Ferry:

- Lamma Island (Sok Kwu Wan and Mo Tat) to Aberdeen

HKR International Limited:

- Discovery Bay Transportation Services – Discovery Bay to Central

Park Island Transport Company Ltd.:

- Ma Wan to Central
- Ma Wan to Tsuen Wan

Discovery Bay Transport Services Ltd.

Discovery Bay to Central

Fortune Ferry (富裕小輪)

- North Point to Kwun Tong
- Tuen Mun to Tai O (via Tung Chung, Sha Lo Wan)
- Central to Hung Hom

Coral Sea Ferry (珊瑚海船務)

- Sai Wan Ho to Kwun Tong
- Sai Wan Ho to Lei Yue Mun (Sam Ka Tsuen)

Tsui Wah Ferry:

- Aberdeen via Pak Kok Tsuen to Lamma Island (Yung Shue Wan)
- Aberdeen via Stanley (Blake Pier) to Po Toi Island
- Ma Liu Shui via Sham Chung and Lai Chi Chong to Tap Mun
- Ma Liu Shui to Tung Ping Chau
- Wong Shek Pier via Ko Lau Wan to Tap Mun
- Wong Shek Pier via Wan Tsai (Nam Fung Wan) to Chek Keng

==== External routes ====
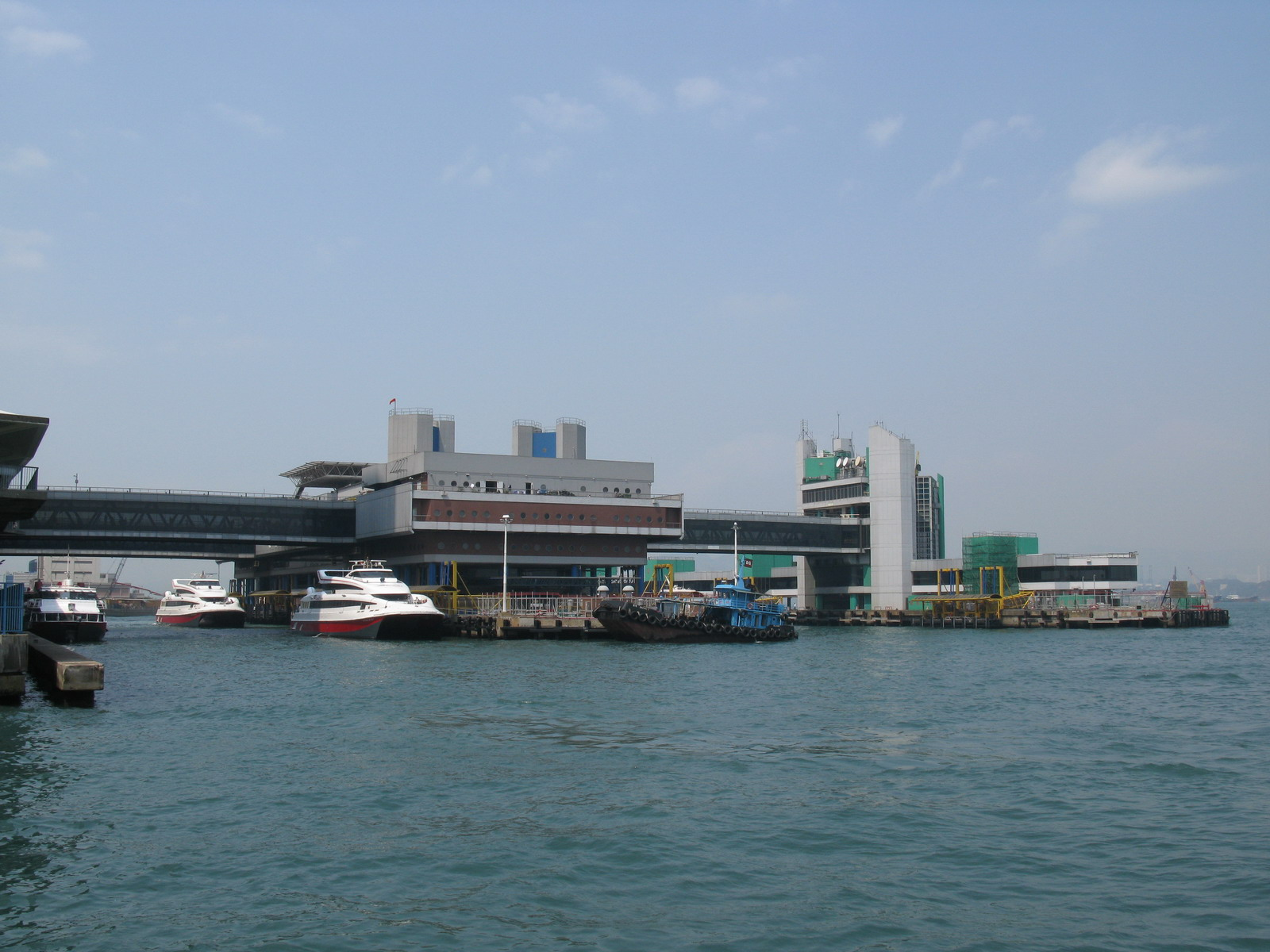
The Hong Kong–Macau Ferry Terminal in Sheung Wan

In Hong Kong, there are three piers that provides ferry services to Macau and cities in southern China:

- The Hong Kong–Macau Ferry Terminal
- The Hong Kong China Ferry Terminal
- The Skypier (For Transitting Only)

Ferry services are provided by several different ferry companies at these piers.

Fastferry hydrofoil and catamaran service is available at all times of the week between Hong Kong and Macau.

TurboJet provides 24-hour services connecting Central and Macau at a frequency of up to every 15 to 30 minutes. It also provides these regular services:

- Hong Kong International Airport to Shenzhen Airport / Macau / Guangzhou (Nansha Ferry Port)
- Tsim Sha Tsui to Guangzhou
- Macau to Shenzhen Airport / Guangzhou
- Tsim Sha Tsui to Macau

Cotai Water Jet provides about 18-hour services connecting Central and Taipa or Outer Harbour, Macau at a frequency of up to every 30 to 60 minutes. It also provides these regular services:

- Hong Kong International Airport to Macau
- Tsim Sha Tsui to Macau

Chu Kong Passenger Transport (CKS) connects Hong Kong to cities in Guangdong province, including Zhuhai (Jiuzhou), Shenzhen (Shekou), Zhongshan (Zhongshan Kong), Lianhua Shan (Panyu), Jiangmen, Gongyi, Sanbu, Gaoming, Heshan, Humen, Nanhai, Shunde, Doumen.

== Air transport ==
=== Aeroplanes ===
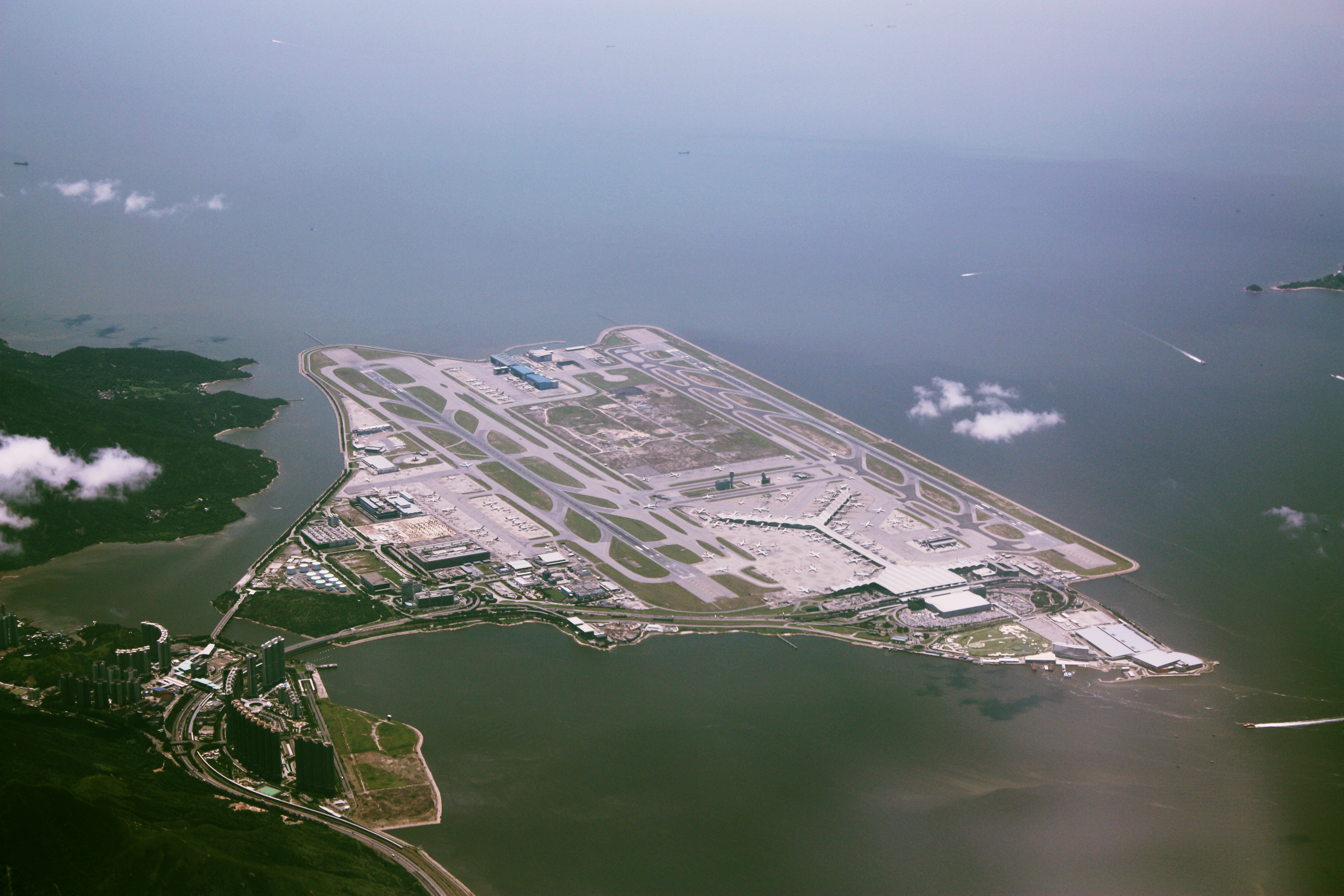
Aerial view of the airport island in 2010

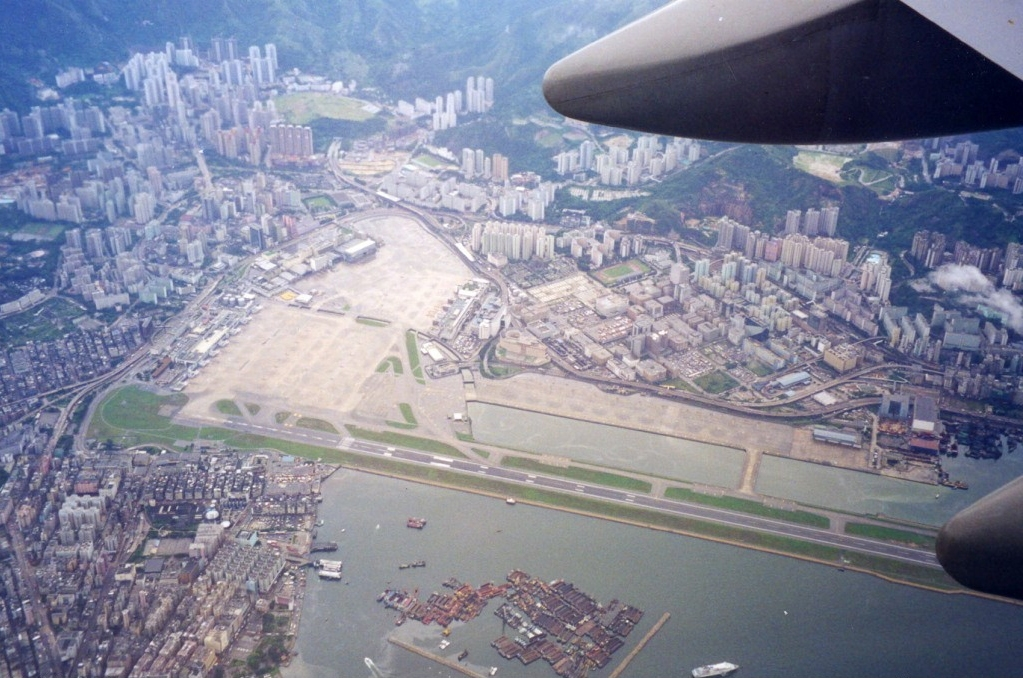
An aerial view of Kai Tak Airport on July 7, 1998, the morning after its closure.

Hong Kong International Airport (HKG) is the primary airport for the territory and has been at Chep Lap Kok since 1998. Over 100 airlines operate flights to international and mainland China destinations from the airport; it is the main hub of flag carrier Cathay Pacific as well as Air Hong Kong, Hong Kong Express, and Hong Kong Airlines. HKG is an important regional transhipment centre, passenger hub, and gateway for destinations in mainland China and the rest of Asia. It also handles the most air cargo traffic in the world. With over 70 million passengers annually, it is the eighth busiest airport worldwide by passenger traffic. HKG is constructed on an artificial island north of Lantau Island and was built to replace the overcrowded Kai Tak Airport in Kowloon Bay. A third runway was constructed as part of the Three-Runway-System. The massive upgrades to the Terminal 2, High-Speed Baggage Systems, the upgrades to the Centre Runway have been completed as of May 2026. The construction of a new Terminal 2 Concourse, and the full planned extension of the APM will be completed in 2027.

Ferry services link Hong Kong and Macau International Airport; there is an express service at the Hong Kong–Macau Ferry Terminal in which passengers can check in to flights at Macau Airport. Macau Airport has an "Express Link" service operating from the Hong Kong-Macau terminal, China Ferry Terminal, and Tuen Mun Ferry Terminal in which transiting passengers to Macau Airport are not processed through Macau customs. In addition there is a bus service between Hong Kong and Shenzhen Bao'an International Airport in Shenzhen, and people going to Shenzhen Airport may also board a ferry that goes to Fuyong Ferry Terminal at Shenzhen Airport.

The majority of area private recreational aviation traffic, under the supervision of the Hong Kong Aviation Club (HKAC), goes in and out of Shek Kong Airfield in the New Territories. The HKAC sent most of its aircraft to Shek Kong in 1994 after the hours for general aviation at Kai Tak Airport were sharply reduced, to two hours per morning, as of 1 July that year. Usage of private aircraft at Shek Kong is restricted to weekends.

=== Helicopters ===
Externally, frequent passenger helicopter flights to Macau are scheduled daily. There are also chartered services for the VIP and business community within Hong Kong.

== Aerial lift transport ==
=== Cable cars ===
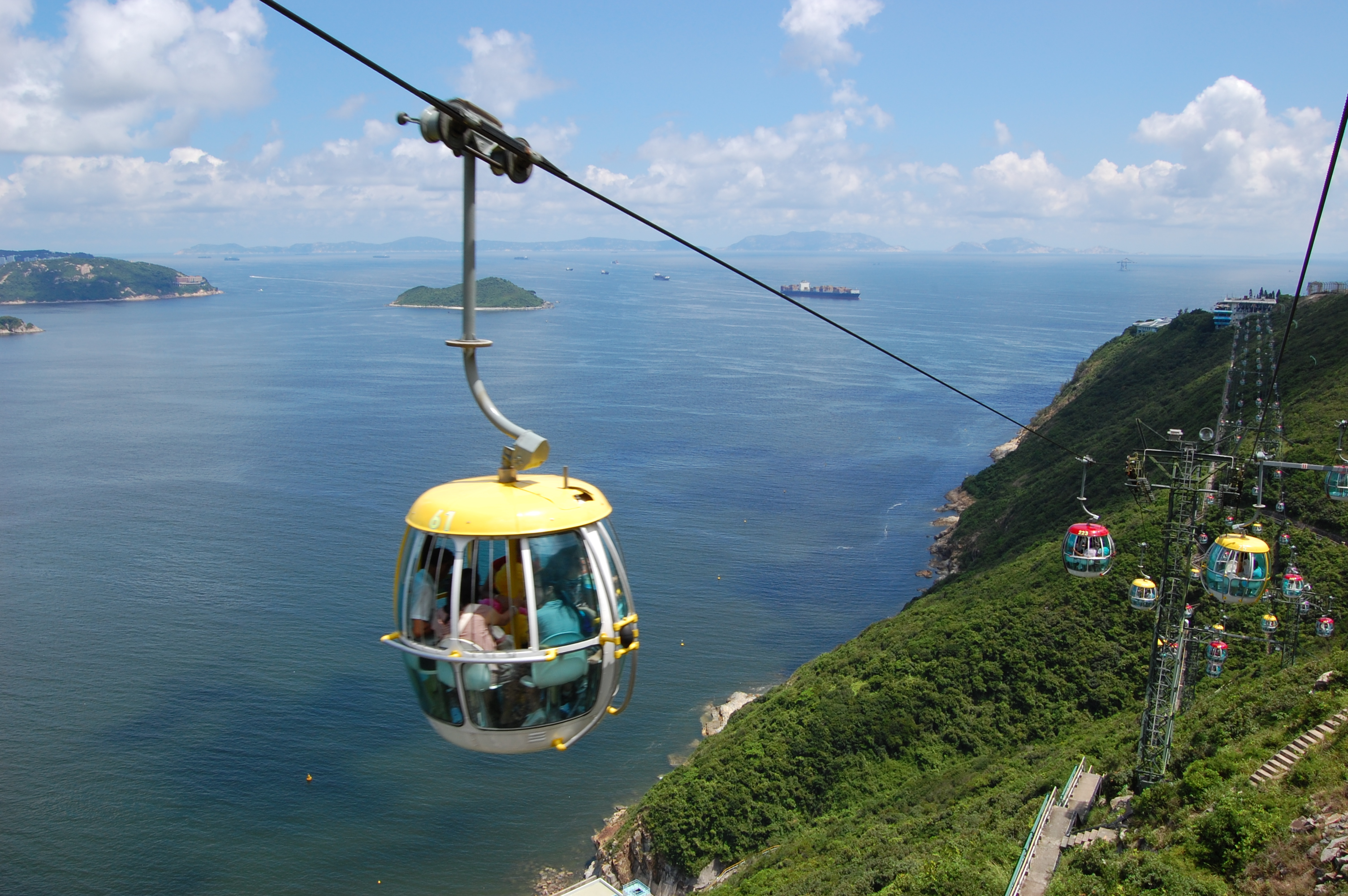
Gondola lift system in Ocean Park

There are two cable car systems in Hong Kong:

- The Ngong Ping Cable Car is a 5.7 kilometres (3.5 mi) public cableway on Lantau Island. It links Tung Chung MTR station and Ngong Ping Terminal near Po Lin Monastery. It was opened on 18 September 2006.
- The Ocean Park theme park also possesses a 1.5 kilometres (0.93 mi) cable car system between Nam Long Shan Headland and Wong Chuk Hang. This was opened in 1977 and is inside the paid area of the Park.

== Infrastructure ==
=== Ports and harbours ===
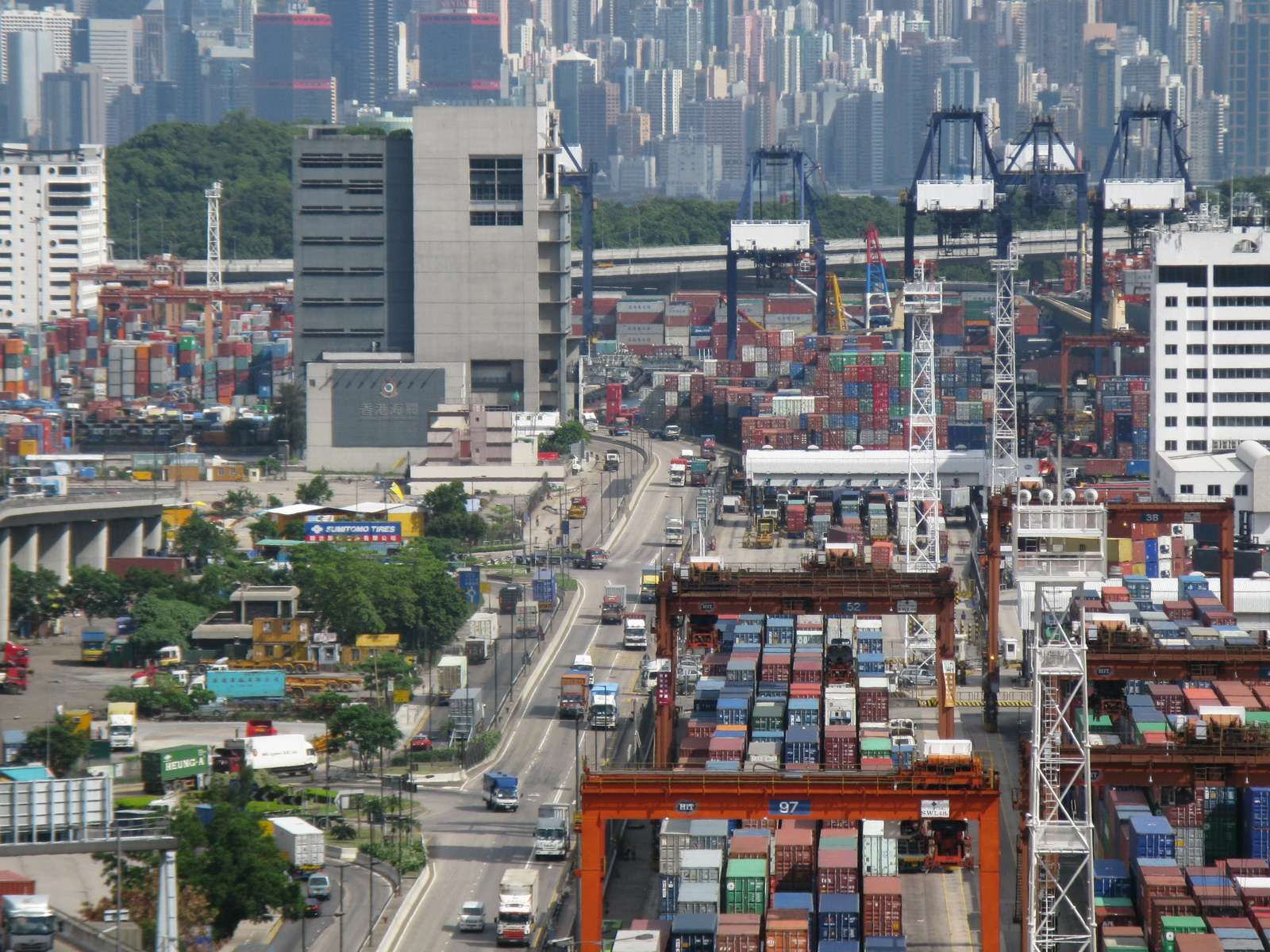
Kwai Tsing Container Terminals

The port of Hong Kong has been a key factor in the development and prosperity of the territory, which is strategically located on the Far East trade routes and is in the geographical centre of the fast-developing Asia-Pacific Basin. The sheltered harbour provides good access and a safe haven for vessels calling at the port from around the world.

The Victoria Harbour is one of the busiest ports in the world. An average of 220,000 ships visit the harbour each year, including both oceanliners and river vessels, carrying both goods and passengers. The container port in Hong Kong is one of the busiest in the world. The Kwai Chung Terminal operates 24 hours a day. Together with other facilities in Victoria Harbour, they handled more than 20 million twenty-foot equivalent units (TEU) in 2005. Some 400 container liners serve Hong Kong weekly, connecting to over 500 destinations around the world.

=== Airports ===
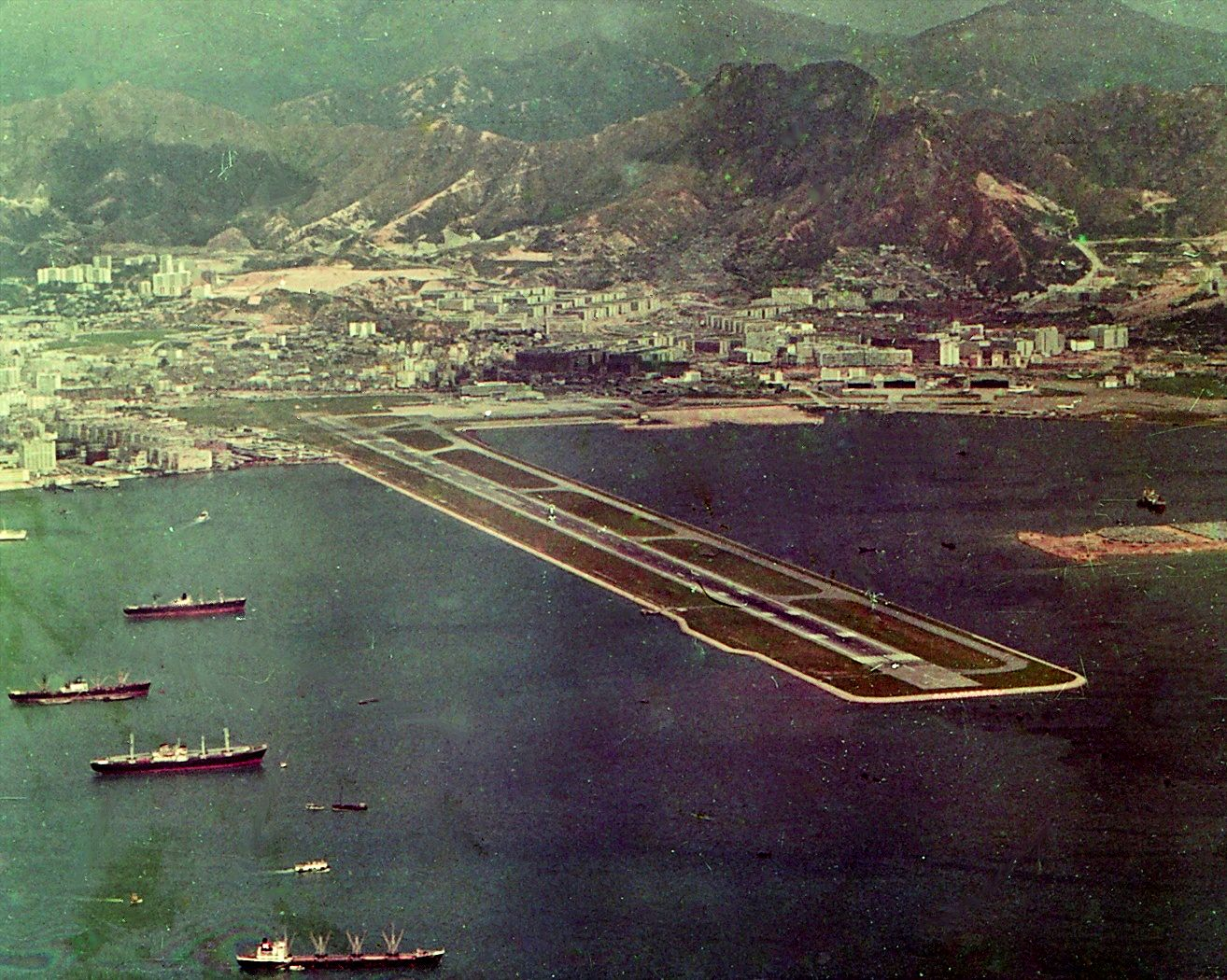
Kai Tak Airport

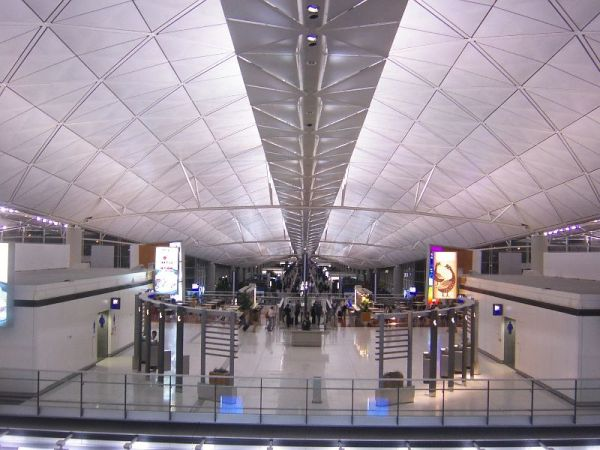
Interior of Hong Kong International Airport

Hong Kong has a fully active international airport. Kai Tak Airport was retired in favour of the Hong Kong International Airport. The airport now serves as a transport hub for East Asia, and as the hub for Cathay Pacific, Hong Kong Express, Hong Kong Airlines, and Air Hong Kong. Ferry services link the airport with several piers in Pearl River Delta, where immigrations and customs are exempted. Kai Tak airport was closed because of privacy reasons and also because of safety reasons; the aircraft came very close to the skyscrapers.

HKIA's network to China expanded with the opening of SkyPier in late-September 2003, offering millions in the PRD direct access to the airport. Passengers coming to SkyPier by high-speed ferries can board buses for onward flights while arriving air passengers can board ferries at the pier for their journeys back to the PRD. Passengers travelling in both directions can bypass custom and immigration formalities, which reduces transit time. Four ports – Shekou, Shenzhen, Macau and Humen (Dongguan) – were initially served. As of August 2007, SkyPier serves Shenzhen's Shekou and Fuyong, Dongguan's Humen, Macau, Zhongshan and Zhuhai. Moreover, passengers travelling from Shekou and Macau piers can even complete airline check-in procedures with participating airlines before boarding the ferries and go straight to the boarding gate for the connecting flight at HKIA. The provision of cross boundary coach and ferry services has transformed HKIA into an inter-modal transportation hub combining air, sea and land transport.

As of March 2009, the airport is the third busiest airport for passenger traffic, and second-busiest airport for cargo traffic in the world. It is popular with travellers – from 2001 to 2005 and 2007–2008 Hong Kong International Airport has been voted the World's Best Airport in an annual survey of several million passengers worldwide by Skytrax.

According to the Guinness World Records, the passenger terminal of the HKIA was the world's largest airport terminal upon opening, and is at present the world's third-largest airport terminal building, with a covered area of 550,000 m^{2} and recently increased to 570,000 m^{2}. The Airport Core Programme was one of the most expensive airport projects in the world.

Shek Kong Airfield, located near Yuen Long, is a military airfield for the People's Liberation Army, which is of limited operating capabilities due to surrounding terrain. The only aircraft operating on the airfield are PLA's Z-9 helicopters, which is the license-built version of the Eurocopter Dauphin.

=== Heliports ===
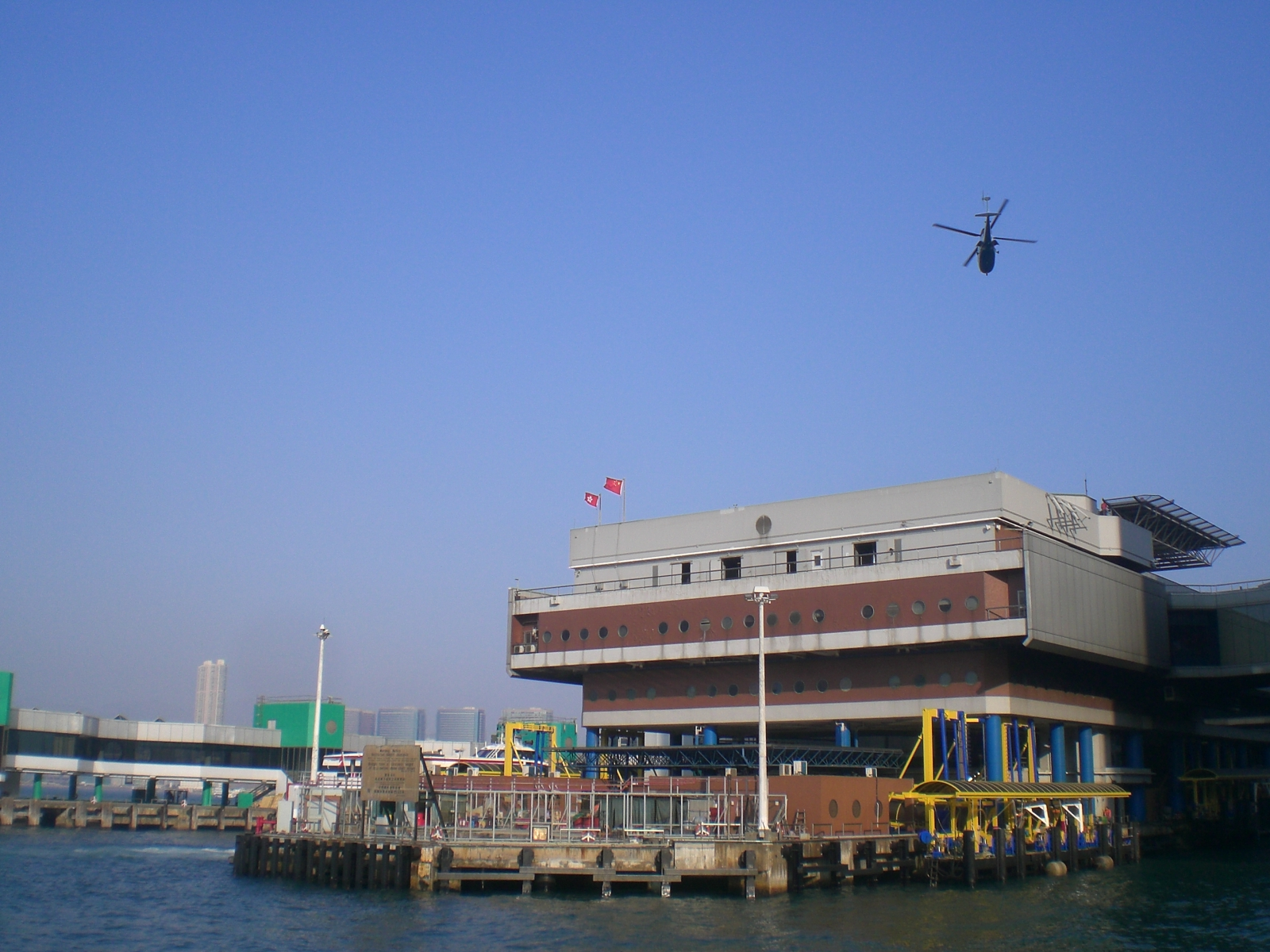
Heliport at the Hong Kong–Macau Ferry Terminal

Hong Kong has three heliports. Shun Tak Heliport (ICAO: VHST) is located in the Hong Kong–Macau Ferry Terminal, by the Shun Tak Centre, in Sheung Wan, on Hong Kong Island. Another is located in southwest Kowloon, near Kowloon station. The other is located inside Hong Kong International Airport.

Heli Express operates regular helicopter service between Macao Heliport (ICAO:VMMH) on the Outer Harbour Ferry Terminal in Macau and the Shun Tak Heliport. There are around 16 flights daily. Flights take approximately 20 minutes in the eight-seater aircraft.

There are also a number of helipads across the territory, including the roof of the Peninsula Hotel (which is the only rooftop helipad in Kowloon and Hong Kong Island, excluding the rooftop heliport of Shun Tak Centre and those in hospitals) and Cheung Chau Island, between Tung Wan Beach and Kwun Yam Beach.

=== Expressways ===
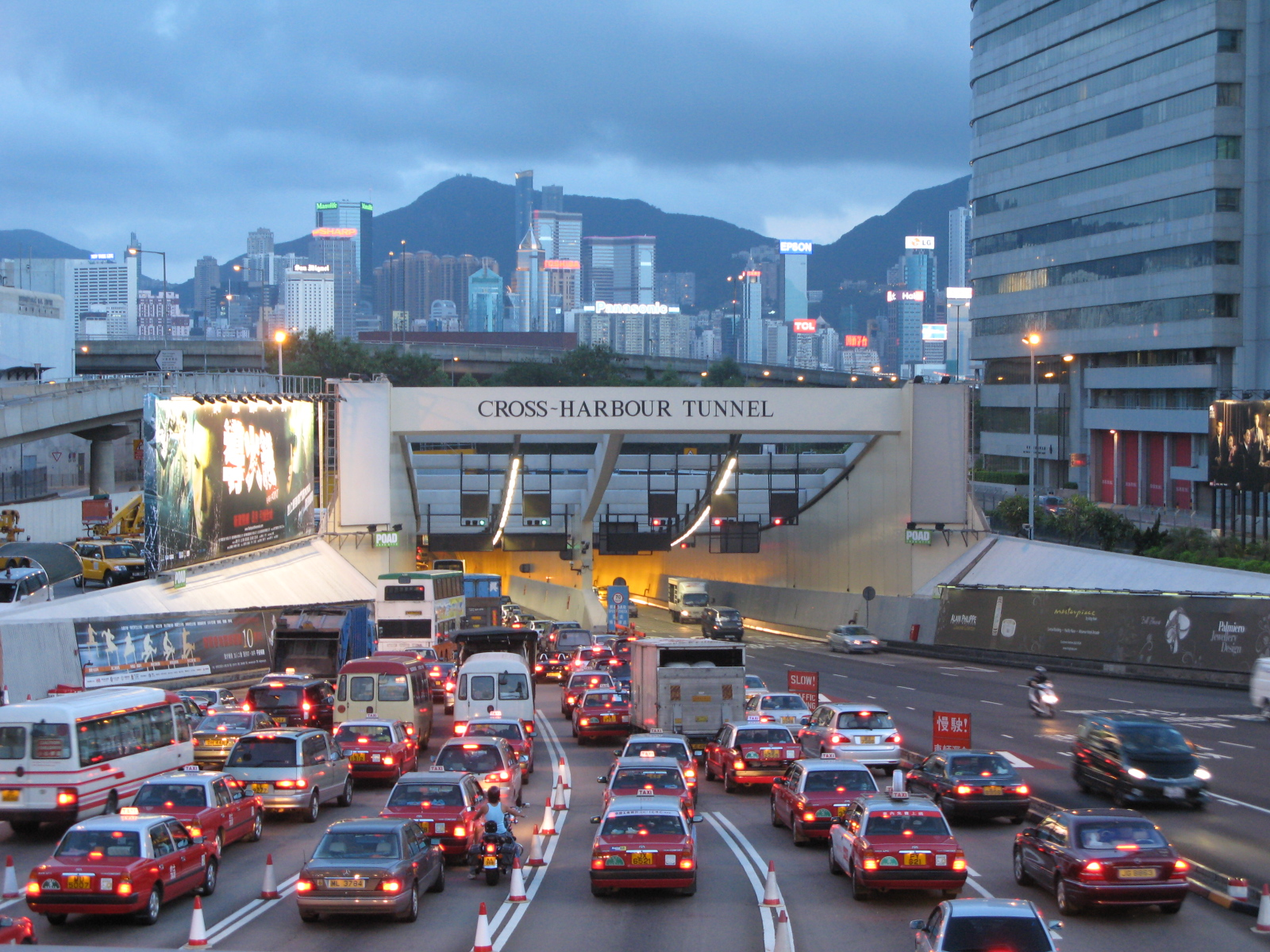
The entrance of the Cross-Harbour Tunnel, which is part of Route 1, in Hung Hom, Kowloon.

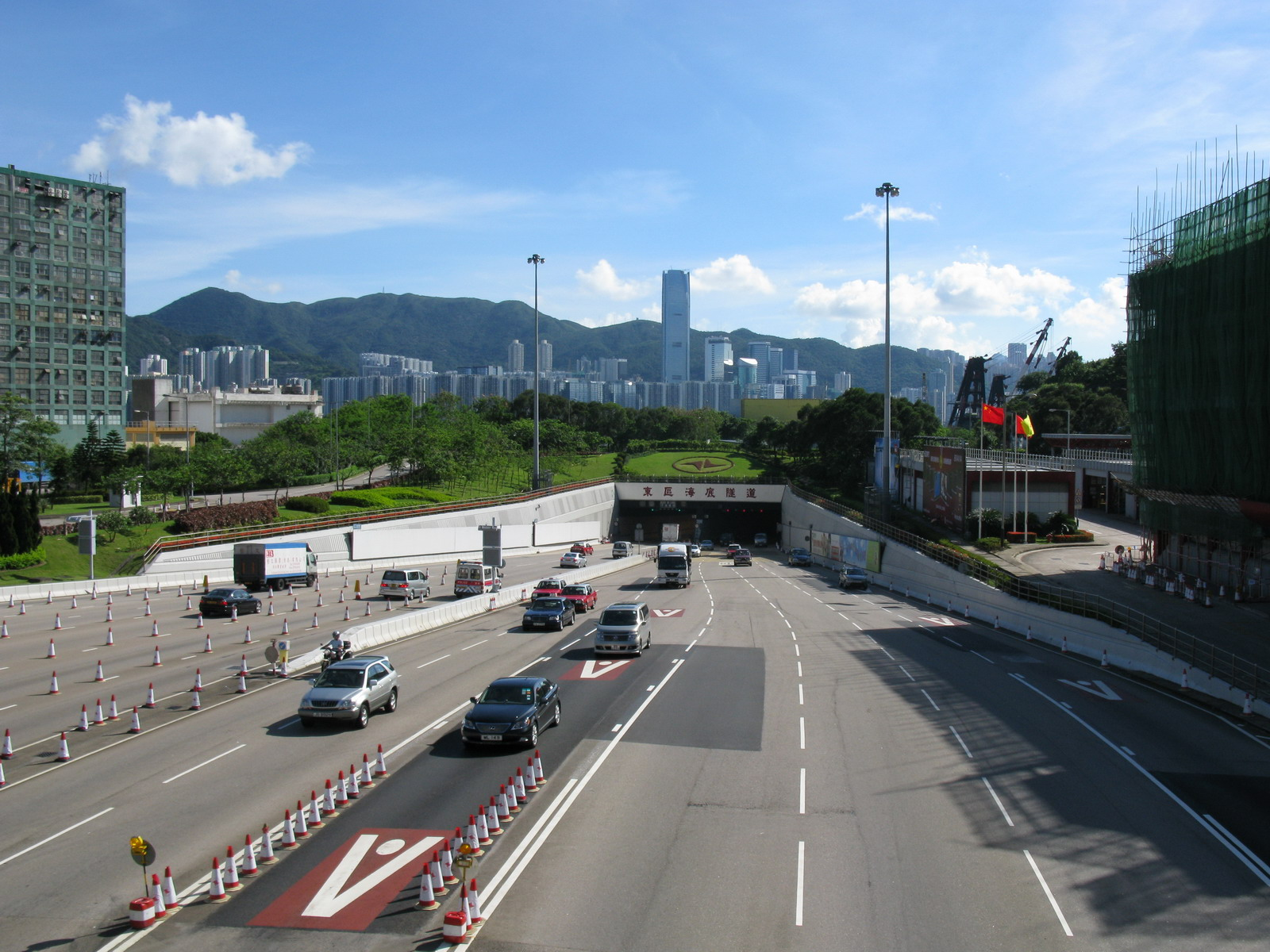
The Eastern Harbour Tunnel is the second under-water tunnel across Victoria Harbour, and is part of Route 2.

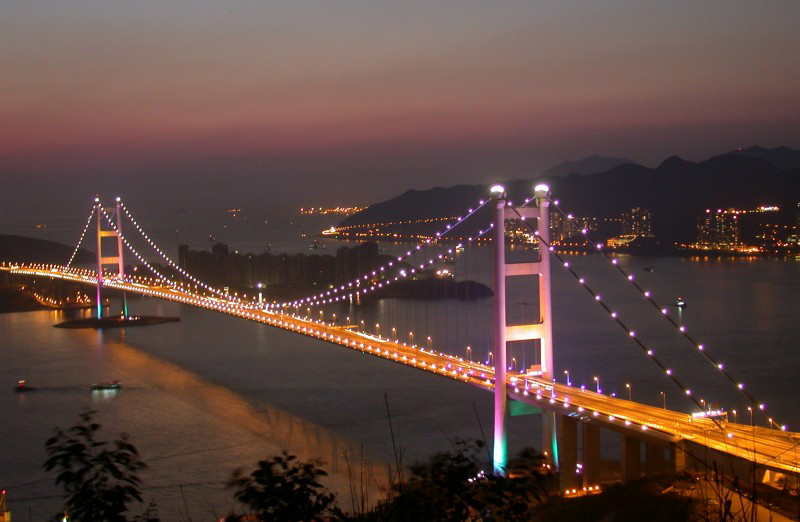
Tsing Ma Bridge, part of Route 8, is the world's longest rail and road suspension bridges.

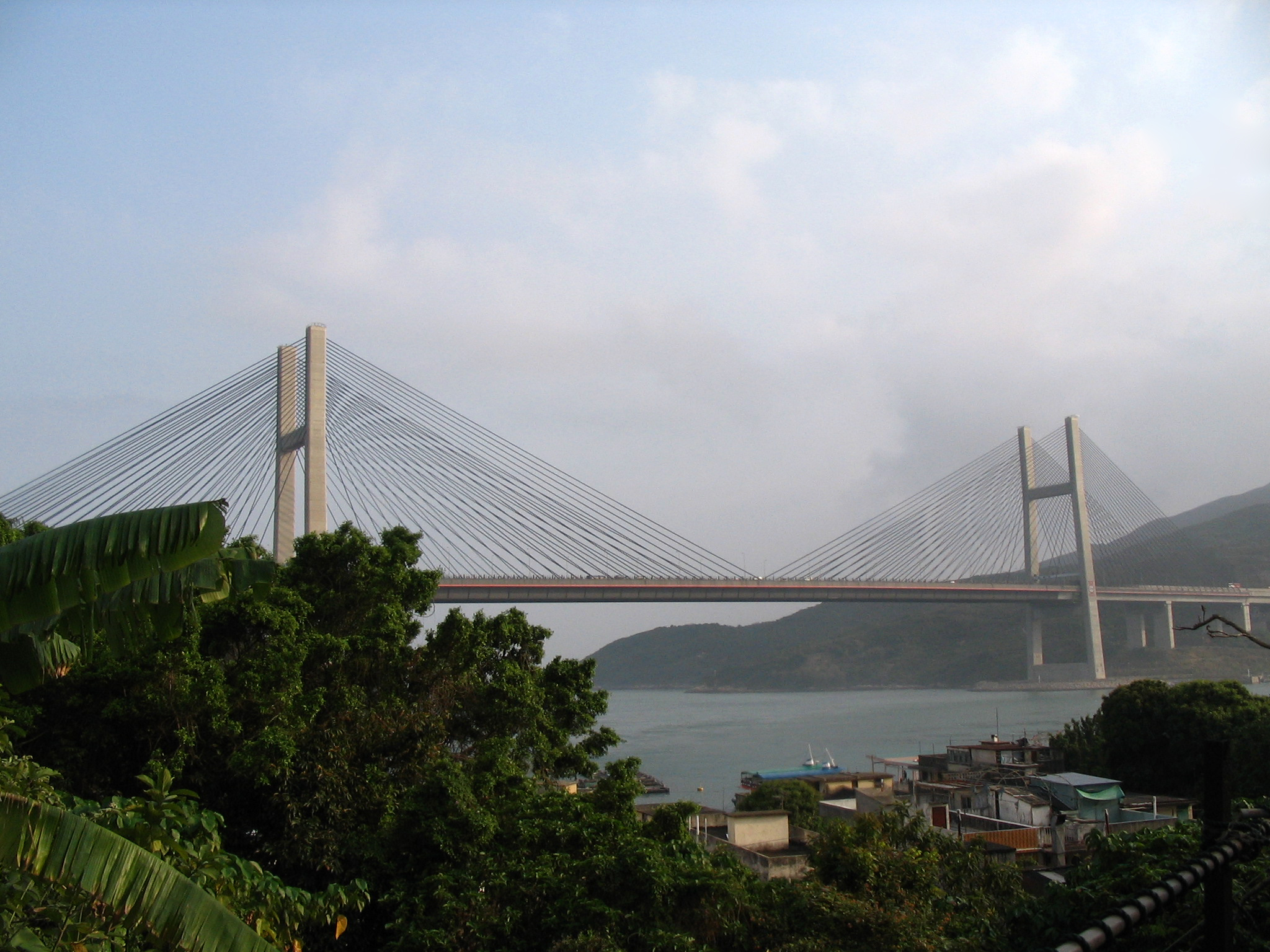
Kap Shui Mun Bridge is a cable-stayed bridge connecting Ma Wan and Lantau Island, and is also part of Route 8.

There are a total of 1,831 km of paved expressways in Hong Kong. These roads are built to British standards with a maximum of four lanes with hard shoulders.

There are nine roads classified as trunk roads in Hong Kong and were renumbered from 1 to 9 in 2004. Routes 1 to 3 are in a north–south direction (with each crossing one of the cross-harbour tunnels) while the others are in an east–west direction:

- Route 1:

Southern District ⇄ Wan Chai ⇄ Hung Hom ⇄ Kowloon Tong ⇄ Sha Tin

- Route 2:

Eastern District ⇄ Kwun Tong ⇄ Wong Tai Sin ⇄ Sha Tin

- Route 3:

Central & Western District ⇄ West Kowloon ⇄ Sham Shui Po ⇄ Kwai Tsing ⇄ Tsuen Wan ⇄ Yuen Long

- Route 4:

Eastern District ⇄ Wan Chai ⇄ Central ⇄ Sai Ying Pun

- Route 5:

Kowloon City ⇄ Yau Ma Tei ⇄ Sham Shui Po ⇄ Kwai Tsing ⇄ Tsuen Wan

- Route 7:

Tseung Kwan O ⇄ Kwun Tong ⇄ Wong Tai Sin ⇄ Sham Shui Po ⇄ Kwai Chung

- Route 8:

Sha Tin <> Kwai Tsing ⇄ Lantau Island North ⇄ Tung Chung ⇄ Airport

- Route 9:

Circular Route linking the whole New Territories (Sha Tin, Tai Po, Northern District, Yuen Long, Tuen Mun, Tsuen Wan)

- Route 10:

Tuen Mun ⇄ Nam Tei (Divided from Route 9) ⇄ Ha Tsuen ⇄ Deep Bay ⇄ Shenzhen Bay Bridge ⇄ Shenzhen Bay Border Crossing ⇄ Mainland China

Route 6 is a proposed Expressway, and is now under construction.

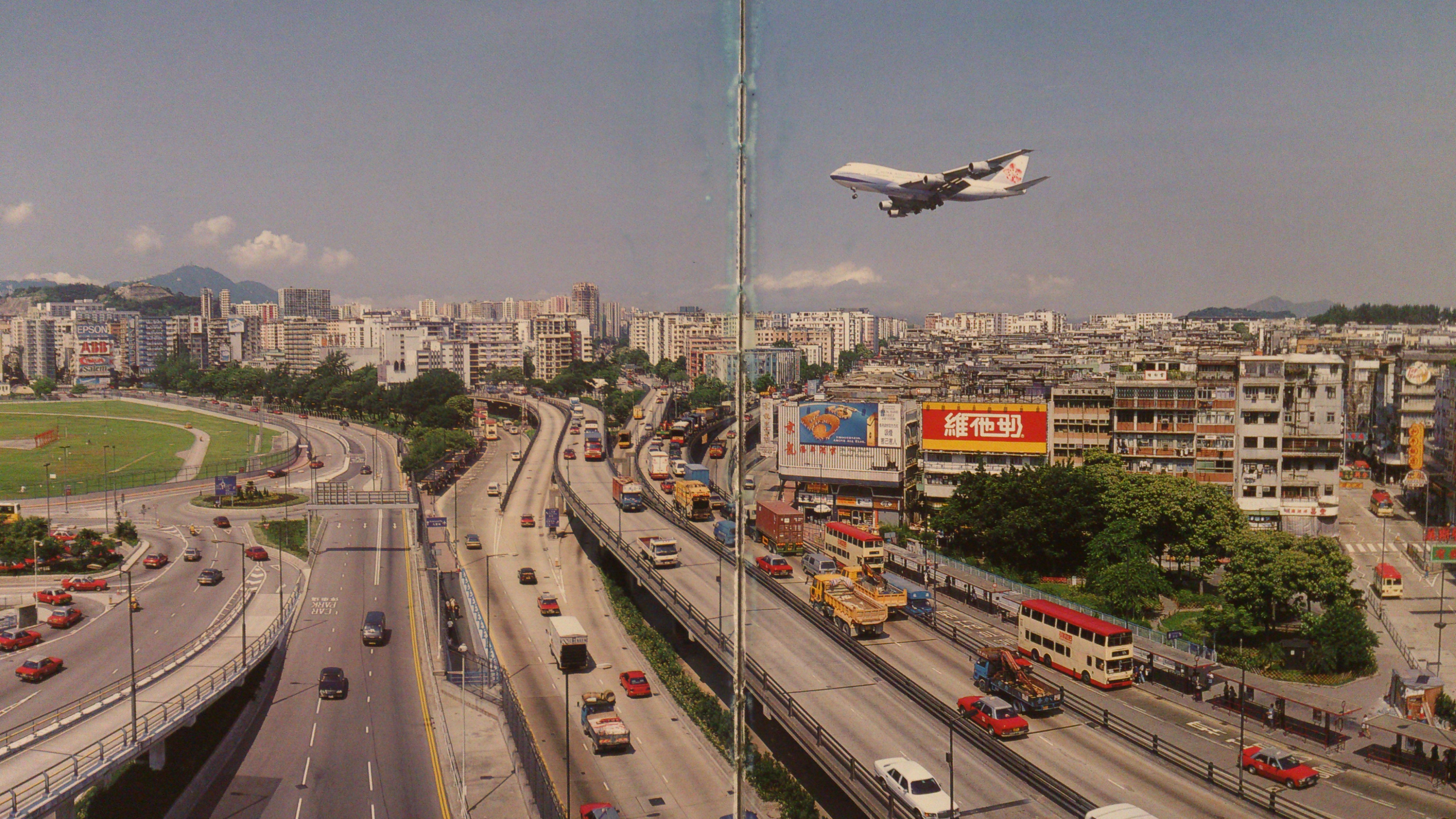
Prince Edward Road and Kai Tak Airport. Kai Tak Airport is now closed

There are 120 CCTV cameras monitoring traffic on these highways and connecting roads which are available on-demand (Now TV) and on the Transport Department's website.

Expressways in Hong Kong use two types of barrier system for divided highways. Older roads use metal guard rails and newer roads use the British Concrete step barrier.

All signage on expressways and roads in Hong Kong are bilingual (traditional Chinese below and English above). Street signs use black text on a white background. Expressway and directional signage are white lettering on a green background.

In Hong Kong, blue-background direction signs are generally used on non-expressway roads to provide directional guidance to major destinations, districts, and strategic routes. They are distinct from green-background signs, which are primarily used on expressways.

=== Bridges and tunnels ===
There are 13 major vehicular tunnels in Hong Kong. They include three cross-harbour tunnels and ten road tunnels.

Other road tunnels and bridges which are proposed or under construction are:

- Central Kowloon Bypass (opened in Dec 2025)
- Trunk Road T2

=== Bus lanes ===
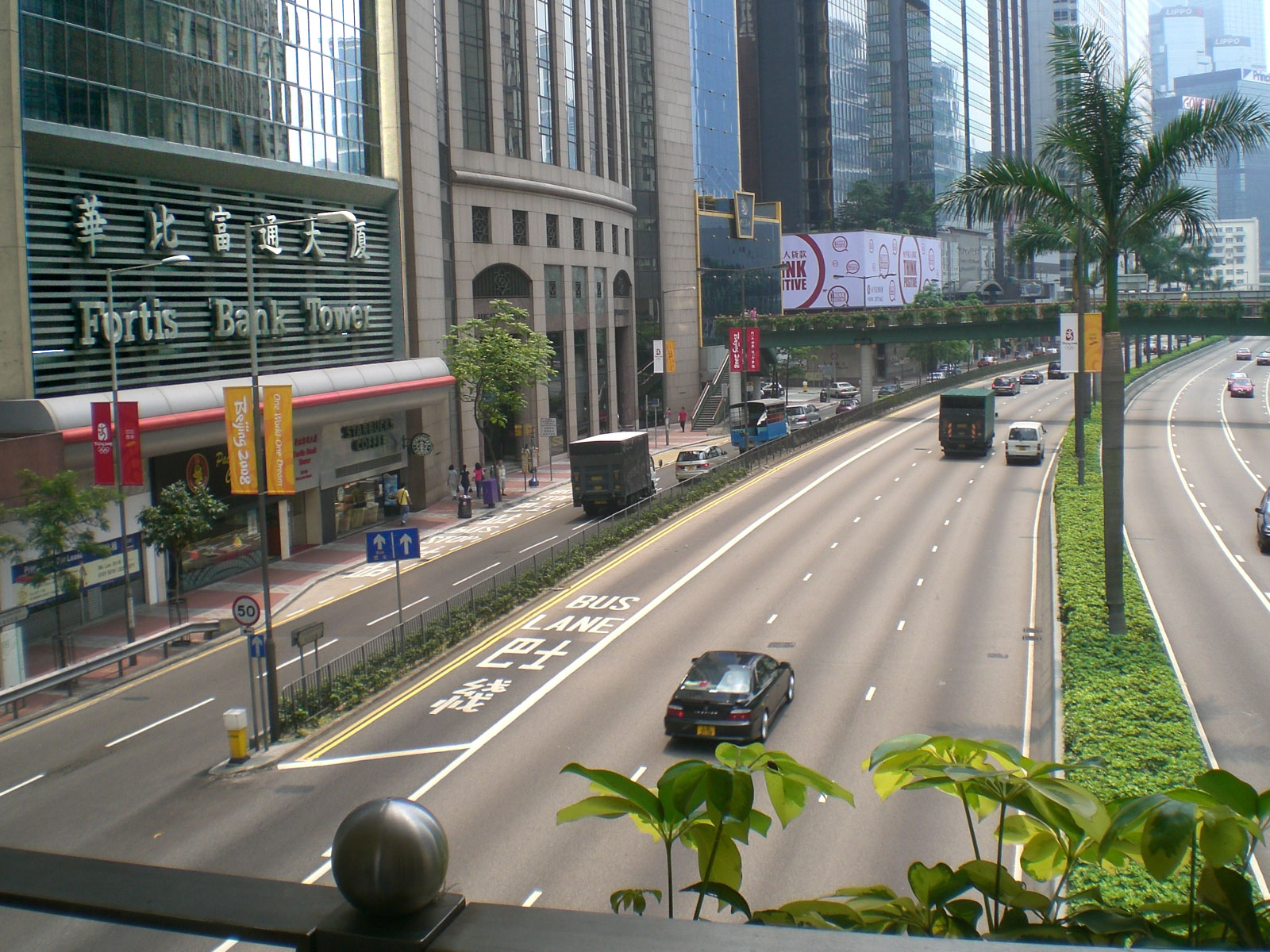
A bus lane on Gloucester Road in Wan Chai, with the words "bus lane" painted in English and "巴士綫" in Chinese

There are approximately 22 km of bus priority lanes in Hong Kong.

=== Bus terminals ===
There are 298 bus terminals in Hong Kong. Notable examples include:

- Admiralty (East) Public Transport Interchange
- Central (Macau Ferry) Bus Terminus
- Pokfield Road Bus Terminus
- Kwun Tong Ferry Bus Terminus
- Central (Exchange Square) Bus Terminus

=== Bicycles ===
Bike path exists across Hong Kong, mostly in newly developed residential areas in New Territories. Most of the traditional urban core does not have bike paths, with them only present in some newly redeveloped or reclaimed coastal areas.

A network of bike rental shops is present near bike paths, in addition to dockless bike renting apps, enabling infrequent users to lease and drop off their bikes along bike paths.

Most public transit require bikes to be folded up and wheels be removed before bikes can be allowed to board.

=== Pedestrian ===
==== Escalators and moving pavements ====
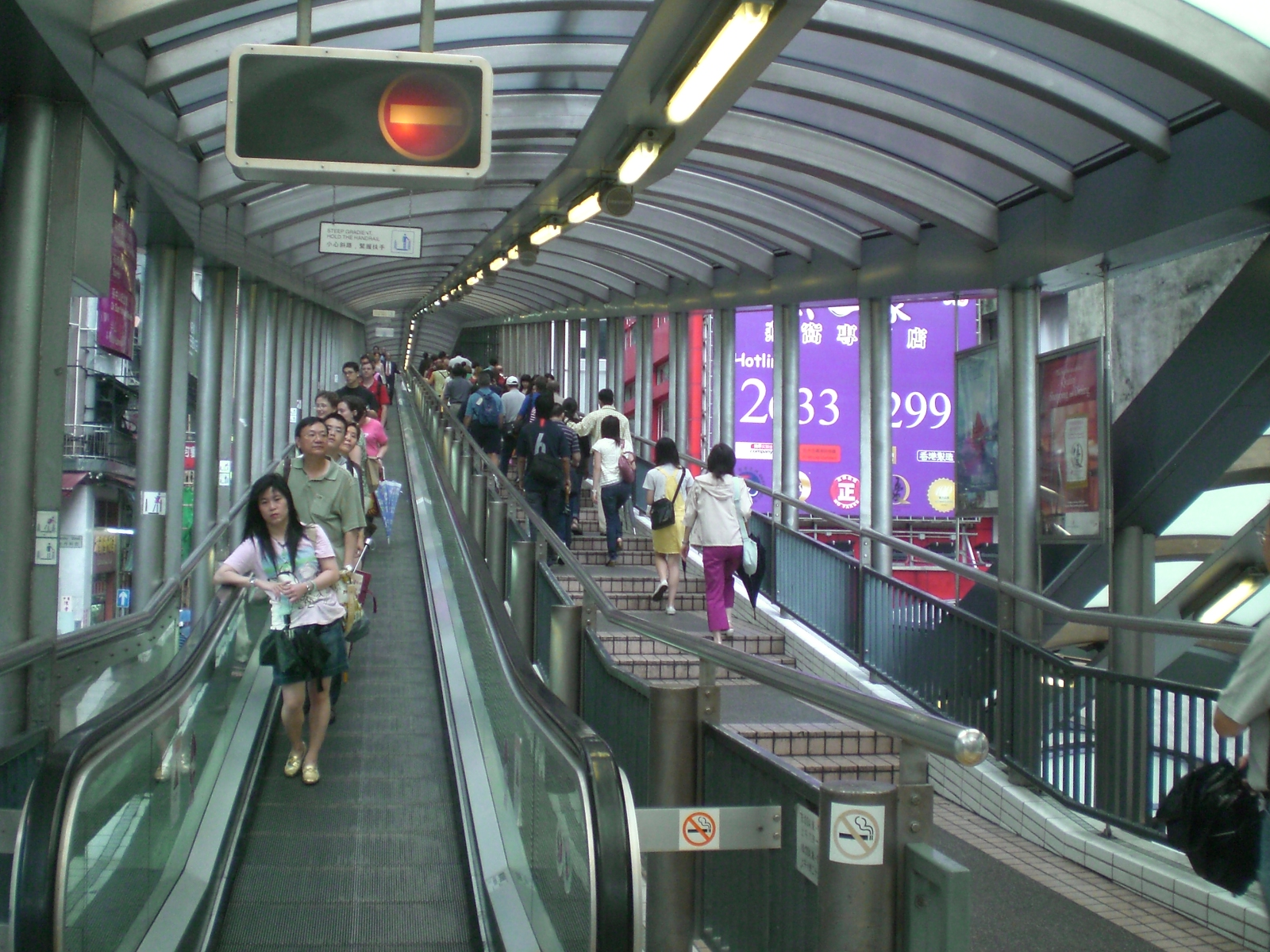
Central–Mid-Levels escalator

Hong Kong Island is dominated by steep, hilly terrain, which required the development of unusual methods of transport up and down the slopes. In Central and Western District, there is an extensive system of zero-fare escalators and moving pavements. The Mid-Levels Escalator is the longest outdoor covered escalator system in the world, operating downhill until 10am for commuters going to work, and then operating uphill until midnight.

The Mid-levels Escalator consists of twenty escalators and three moving pavements. It is 800 metres long, and climbs 135 vertical metres. Total travel time is approximately 25 minutes, but most people walk while the escalator moves to shorten the travel time. Due to its vertical climb, the same distance is equivalent to several miles of zigzagging roads if travelled by car. Daily traffic exceeds 35,000 people. It has been operating since 1993 and cost HK$240,000,000 (US$30,000,000) to build.

A smaller Mid-Levels escalator system was built on Centre Street in Sai Ying Pun. Also in Sai Ying Pun are small escalators between First and Second Streets, in an uphill plaza that forms a giant hole through the Island Crest building. There is also a small escalator on Sands Street in Kennedy Town. There have been several more proposed outdoor escalators, including plans for Pound Lane, the entrance to the campus of the University of Hong Kong (which already has some escalators within and connecting it with the MTR) and projects in parts of Hong Kong away from Hong Kong Island.

==== Pedestrian bridges, tunnels, and skyways ====
Example includes:

- Central Elevated Walkway
- Wanchai North Skyway Platform
- Tseung Kwan O Cross Bay Bridge
- Lek Yuen Bridge

==== Pavement railings ====
During the 2019–2020 pro-democracy protests in Hong Kong, 60 kilometres (37 mi) of pavement railings were damaged by the demonstrators. Hong Kong's Transport and Highways Departments spent an estimated HK$15 million ($1.9 million) of taxpayer money rebuilding and reinforcing the fencing. The city government has more than doubled its installation of pedestrian rails, from 730 kilometres (450 mi) in 2010 to 1,500 kilometres (930 mi) by 2018. Many of the railings prevent pedestrians from walking in a straight line along major roads by prohibiting direct crossing of perpendicular side streets. Paul Zimmerman, a district councillor and a member of a government advisory commission to improve urban design, and other pavement-fence critics argue the barriers are emblematic of the way Hong Kong streets are built to prioritise vehicles over pedestrians. The city likes the guardrails because they do not want to slow turning cars but prioritising vehicles limits the throughput capacity of the city. Pedestrians who want to walk faster than the shuffling crowds must go into the streets, exposing them to vehicle traffic. The Transport and Highways departments say the railings are critical “to regulate and guide pedestrians for road safety and traffic management purposes.” Hong Kong's high population density makes pedestrian mobility complicated and the railings offer a clear distinction between the automobiles and walkers. But in a city where less than 10% of the population owns a car, anti-fence advocates question why automobiles get primacy. Nonprofit groups like Walk DVRC, in conjunction with Zimmerman, have worked to remove some of the guardrails but the city believes they are necessary. The railings, which are too flimsy to fend off cars, provide little to no protection from automobiles. Walk DVRC has submitted a detailed proposal including pictures and recommendations for 456 railings. There are 105 of those that they claim “have been removed to the benefit of pedestrians” and should not be reinstalled. Nevertheless, the city is determined to replace the removed railings and is moving forward despite public pushback.

== Ports of entry ==
This is a list of ports of entry (i.e. immigration control points) in Hong Kong.

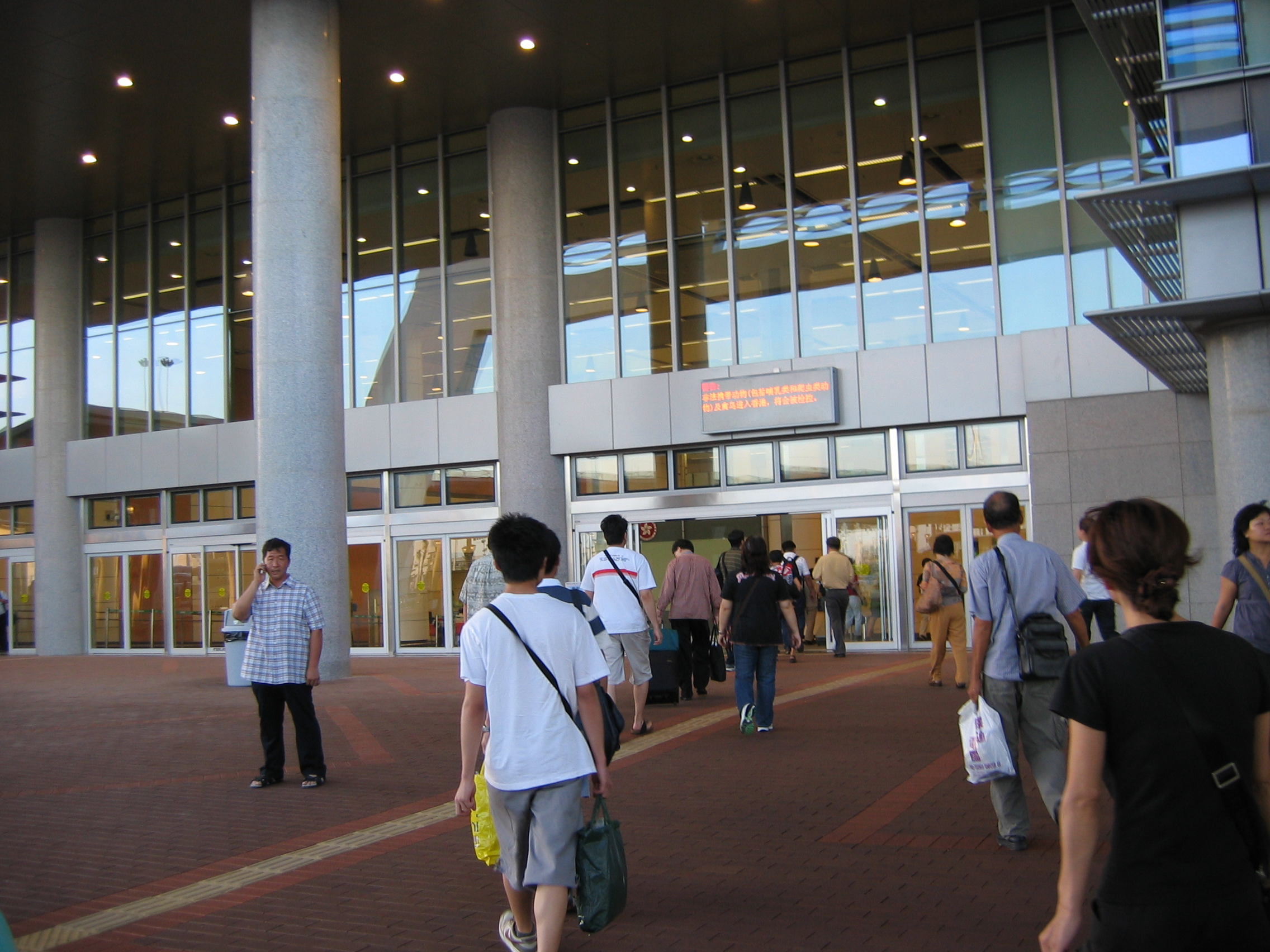
The entrance to the building of the Shenzhen Bay Control Point

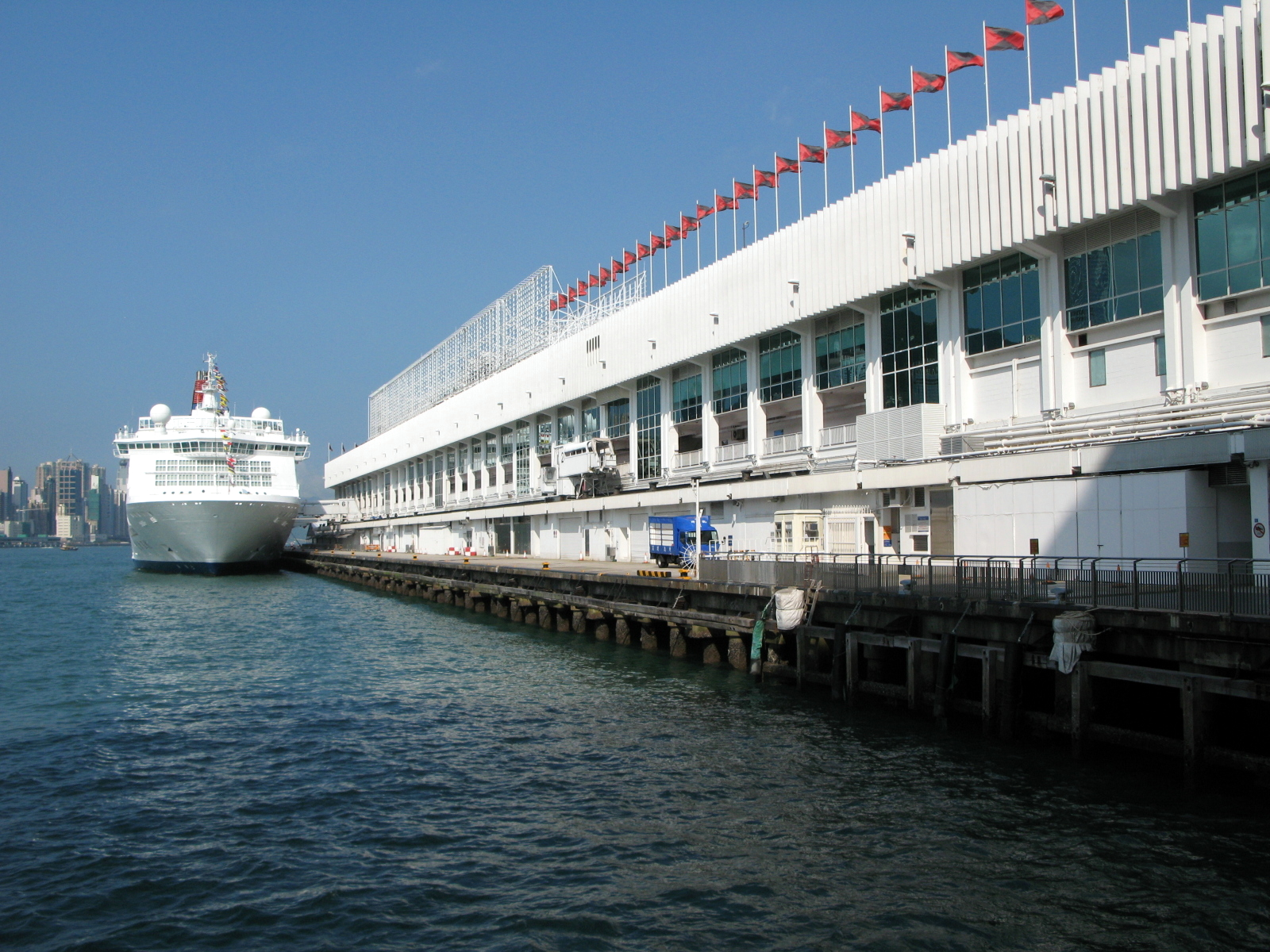
The cruise-ship pier at Ocean Terminal is also a port of entry to Hong Kong.

- Air
  - Hong Kong International Airport
  - Heliport at the Hong Kong-Macau Ferry Terminal
- Land
  - Heung Yuen Wai Control Point
  - Hong Kong–Zhuhai–Macau Bridge (HZMB) Hong Kong Port
  - Lo Wu Control Point
  - Lok Ma Chau Control Point
  - Lok Ma Chau Spur Line
  - Man Kam To Control Point
  - Sha Tau Kok Control Point
  - Shenzhen Bay Control Point
- Railway
  - Hung Hom Terminus (also called Kowloon Terminus)
  - West Kowloon Terminus
- Sea
  - Hong Kong–Macau Ferry Terminal
  - Hong Kong China Ferry Terminal
  - Ocean Terminal
  - Kai Tak Cruise Terminal
  - Tuen Mun Ferry Pier
  - Western Immigration Anchorage
  - Eastern Immigration Anchorage
  - Tuen Mun Immigration Anchorage

== See also ==
- Vehicle registration plates of Hong Kong
- Hong Kong Link
- Hong Kong–Zhuhai–Macau Bridge
- List of airports in Hong Kong
- List of places in Hong Kong
- List of streets and roads in Hong Kong
- Speed limits in Hong Kong
- Victoria Harbour crossings
- Village vehicle
