= Speed limits in Hong Kong =

The general speed limit in Hong Kong is 50 km/h, which applies to all roads unless signed otherwise.

At present, the 50 km/h limit mostly applies to urban roads and other non-arterial roads in the New Territories. Some mountain roads, most notably on Lantau Island, have a lower 30 km/h limit.

Most urban trunk, distributor and peripheral roads as well as many rural carriageways with higher traffic flow and length have a standard speed limit of 70 km/h, such as Clear Water Bay Road. Newly constructed roads of this category have an 80 km/h limit such as Heung Yuen Wai Highway.

Most urban expressways in Hong Kong have a speed limit of 70 km/h or 80 km/h, while in the New Territories and for the West Kowloon Highway a higher limit of 100 km/h is used. The speed limit of the North Lantau Highway is 110 km/h, which is the highest speed limit in Hong Kong.

== Justifications ==
The Hong Kong government has stated that road safety is of primary concern when setting speed limits. Nonetheless, the government also weighs in road design, location and purpose in setting speed limits to minimise confusion and discourage speeding.

Speed limits are divided into a three-band system that aims to set limits in a consistent manner based on a few key characteristics, with only minor variation within each band. The low band of 50 km/h is intended to apply to built-up areas regardless of location. The middle band is intended for areas outside urban or new town built-up areas and imposes 70 or 80 km/h limits. In practice, however, these limits have been adjusted relatively frequently due to the construction of new roads and increasing urbanisation in the New Territories. In the 1980s, most rural carriageways had a speed limit of 70 km/h, but many have since been reduced to 50 km/h in light of the increased development and the diversion of traffic to high-standard expressways. At the same time, a higher speed limit of 80 km/h has become standard for newly constructed trunk routes. The high band of 100 or 110 km/h applies to high-standard expressways and is the current design standard adopted for new expressways in the New Territories.

== Enforcement ==
The speed limit for buses, medium and heavy goods vehicles is 70 km/h for all roads with a general speed limit at or above 70 km/h.

A speeding offence under 10 km/h over the speed limit is not enforced; many drivers in Hong Kong travel within this range.

== See also ==
- Transport in Hong Kong
