= Chuen Kee Ferry =

Hong Kong ferry operator

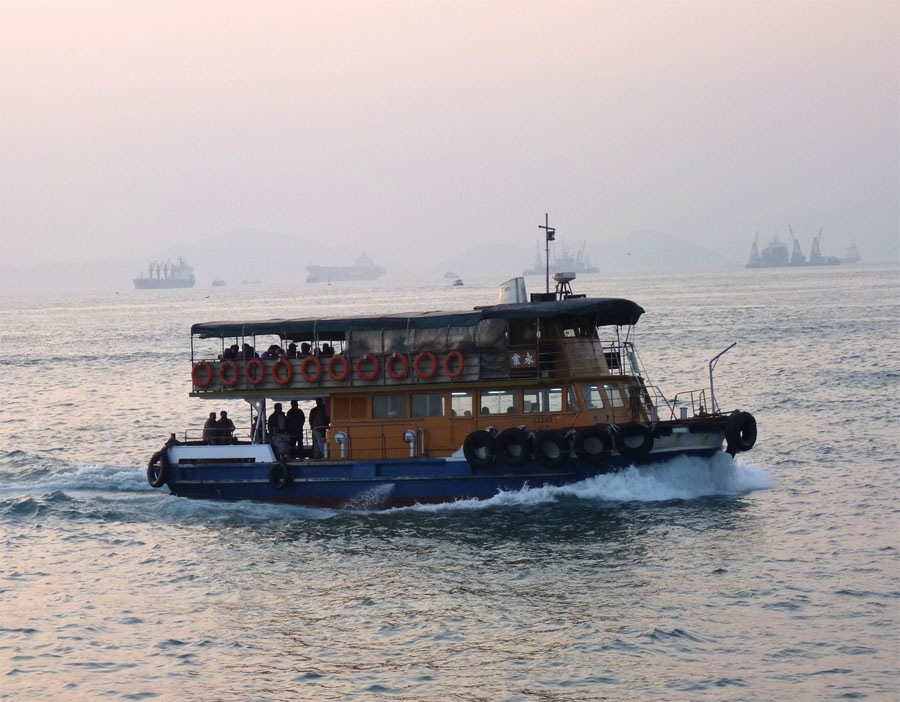
Chuen Kee Ferry's Kaito.

Chuen Kee Ferry Ltd (Chinese: 全記渡有限公司) is a licensed ferry operator in Hong Kong. It operates the Aberdeen via Mo Tat Wan to Sok Kwu Wan route. Chuen Kee has been established for 50 years. The company's office is located at G/F, 17, Second Street, Sok Kwu Wan, Lamma Island, Hong Kong.

== History ==
In the 1950s, company founder Mr. Wu Chuen purchased a sailing-ship to transport Lamma Island's residents to Aberdeen. Today the company uses a kaito for its services.

== Routes ==
It currently operates the following routes:

- Aberdeen via Mo Tat Wan to Sok Kwu Wan
