= Hung Shing Temple =

Temple dedicated to Hung Shing Tai Wong

- Traditional Chinese: 洪聖廟
- Simplified Chinese: 洪圣庙
Transcriptions
Standard Mandarin
- Hanyu Pinyin: Hóngshèngmiào
Yue: Cantonese
- Yale Romanization: Hùhng sing miuh
- Jyutping: Hung^{4} sing^{3} miu^{6}

Tai Wong Temples
- Traditional Chinese: 大王廟
- Simplified Chinese: 大王庙
Transcriptions
Standard Mandarin
- Hanyu Pinyin: Dàwángmiào
Yue: Cantonese
- Yale Romanization: Daaih wòhng miuh
- Jyutping: Daai^{6} wong^{4} miu^{6}

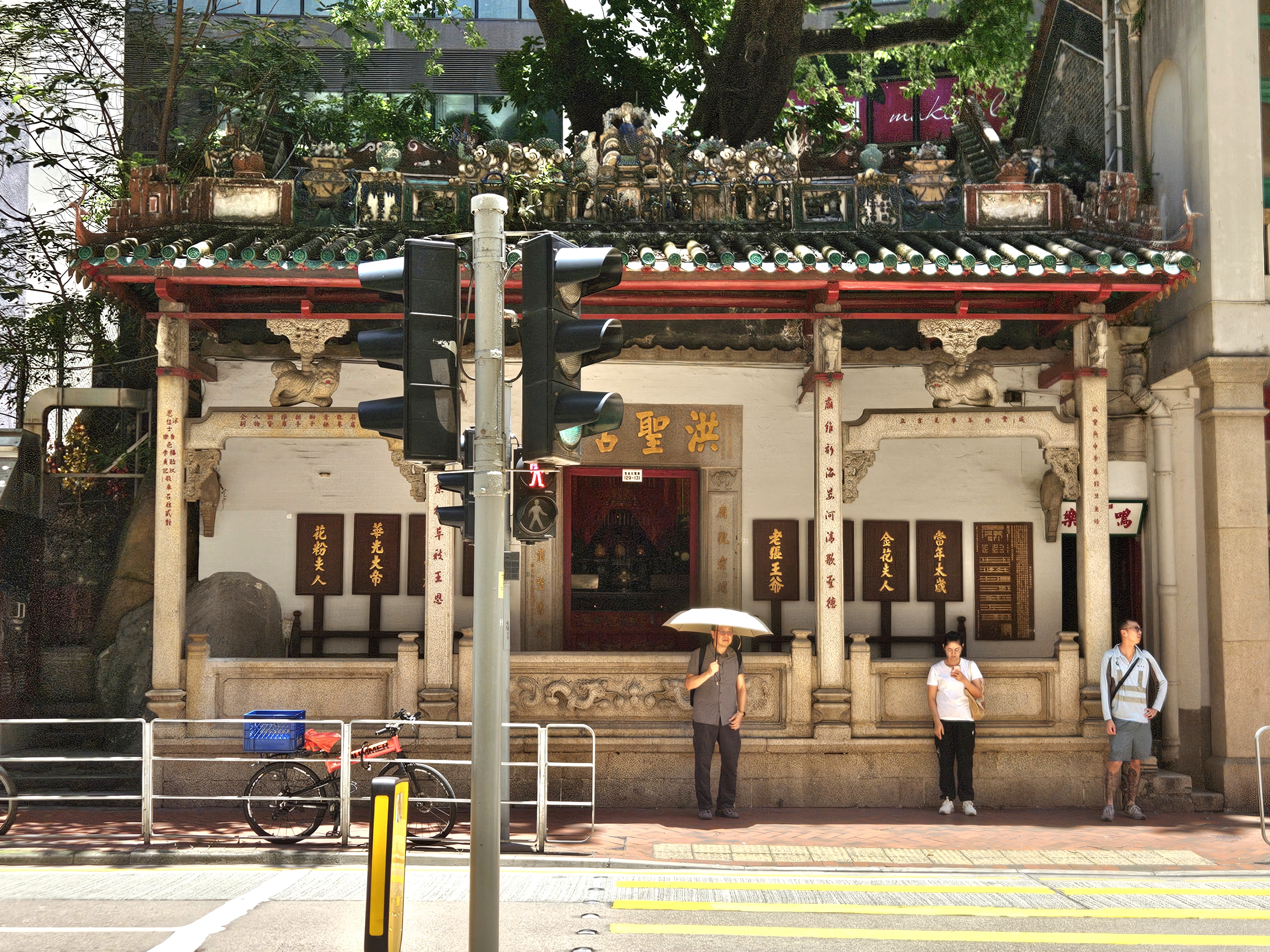
Hung Shing Temple, Wan Chai

Hung Shing Temples or Tai Wong Temples are temples dedicated to Hung Shing Tai Wong (Chinese: 洪聖大王). Hung Shing temples have been widely built in southern China, especially Guangdong province and in Hong Kong.

== Hong Kong ==
=== Existing temples ===
There are several Hung Shing Temples in Hong Kong, including 6 on Lantau Island and one only in urban Kowloon. The table provides a partial list of these temples. Hung Shing Festivals (洪聖誕) are celebrated on the 13th day of the 2nd month in Chinese calendar at the Hung Shing Temples in Ap Lei Chau, Tai Kok Tsui, Cheung Chau, Sha Lo Wan and Kau Sai Chau.

A territory-wide grade reassessment of historic buildings is ongoing. The grades listed in the table are based on data from 8 June 2023. The temples with a "Not listed" status in the table below are not graded and do not appear in the list of historic buildings considered for grading. While most probably incomplete, this list is tentatively exhaustive.

Location	Notes	Status	Details	Photographs
Nos. 129–131 Queen's Road East, Wan Chai 22.275431°N 114.170831°E	Hung Shing Temple, Wan Chai Constructed before 1847, it used to overlook the sea front. The tile-roofed temple was built on large boulders against a craggy terrain. Subsequent to a number of land reclamations, it is now surrounded by modern commercial and residential buildings. Management of the temple delegated to the Tung Wah Group of Hospitals by the Chinese Temples Committee.	Grade I		
Shau Kei Wan temple cluster. On the hillside of Shau Kei Wan Road. Near No. 8 Chai Wan Road, Shau Kei Wan 22.275828°N 114.228202°E	Hung Shing Temple (洪聖古廟) Built in 1980. Part of a cluster of 6 temples built on a flattened hilltop by the Shau Kei Wan Kaifong Advancement Association (筲箕灣街坊福利促進會), it is adjacent to a Fuk Tak Temple. Originally located at Aldrich Village (愛秩序村), it was moved to the present location when the village was demolished. (It is on the right on the picture)	Nil grade		
Ngoi Man Street, Shau Kei Wan 22.276739°N 114.227538°E	Hung Shing Temple	Not listed		
No. 9 Hung Shing Street, Ap Lei Chau 22.244921°N 114.155888°E	Hung Shing Temple, Ap Lei Chau (鴨脷洲洪聖廟) Built by local residents in 1773, it is the oldest temple in the Aberdeen and Ap Lei Chau areas. Managed by the Chinese Temples Committee. The interior of the temple can be explored with Google Street View.	Declared		
Tin Wan Hill Road, at the junction with Shek Pai Wan Road, Tin Wan, Southern District 22.249861°N 114.147337°E	Tai Wong Kung Kung Temple (大王公公廟)	Not listed		
Northern coast of Ap Lei Chau 22.245565°N 114.148221°E	Tai Wong Temple (大王宫)	Pending		
Near the southern junction of Old Main Street Aberdeen and Aberdeen Main Street, Aberdeen 22.247261°N 114.156269°E	Tai Wong Kung Temple (大王公廟) Part of the "Guardians of Aberdeen" group of small temples and shrines.	Not listed		
Island Road, Deep Water Bay 22.24409°N 114.18835°E	Tai Wong Kung Kung Temple (大王公公廟)	Not listed		
Western end of Stanley Main Street, Stanley 22.218757°N 114.210442°E	Tai Wong Temple, Stanley or Tai Wong Kung (大王宫) Dedicated to Tai Wong. The date of construction of the building is unknown. The Temple enjoys a good feng shui setting with its entrance oriented to the South, facing the Stanley Bay and backed by a forested knoll. The Temple consists of a row of three small houses which were built in line with the shape of the feng shui rock behind. A small separate To Tei Temple (土地廟) is located to its left.	Nil grade		
58 Fuk Tsun Street (福全街), Tai Kok Tsui 22.322036°N 114.163503°E	Hung Shing Temple, Tai Kok Tsui (大角咀洪聖殿) Originally built in 1881 in the village of Fuk Tsun Heung (福全鄉) which was located at the intersection of Boundary Street and Tai Kok Tsui Road. In 1928, the Government developed the area and the Village was cleared. In 1930, the temple was rebuilt at the present site, which was named after the Village, and it has since been managed by the Tung Wah Group of Hospitals, by delegation from the Chinese Temples Committee. It is the only Hung Shing temple in urban Kowloon.	Grade III		
Ngau Tau Kok Road Children's Playground, Ngau Tau Kok 22.316935°N 114.217261°E	Tai Wong Temple, Ngau Tau Kok (牛頭角大王殿)	Not listed		
Ngau Chi Wan Village, Wong Tai Sin District 22.335028°N 114.209444°E	Tai Wong Temple	Not listed		
Near Ha Kwai Chung Tsuen (下葵涌村), Kwai Chung. Located across Kwai Chung Road from Kwai Fong Terrace. 22.355434°N 114.12941°E	Tin Hau Temple, Kwai Chung (葵涌天后廟) Partly dedicated to Hung Shing. Built prior to 1828, the original temple was relocated to the present site in 1966 to make way for the port reclamation in Kwai Chung.	Nil grade		
Top floor, 75 Ham Tin Street, Shek Pik New Village, Tsuen Wan 22.368131°N 114.117094°E	Hung Hau Temple (洪侯古廟) At the time of the construction of the Shek Pik Reservoir on Lantau Island, in the late 1950s, most of the villagers of Shek Pik Village moved into five-storey apartment blocks in the urban Shek Pik New Village (石碧新村) in Tsuen Wan. The two temples, Hau Wong Temple and Hung Shing Temple, were combined into the current Hung Hau Temple.	Not listed		
Opposite to Chui Kwai House, Kwai Chung Estate, Tai Wo Hau Road, Tai Wo Hau 22.366914°N 114.129168°E	Tin Hau temple, Tai Wo Hau (大窩口天后廟) Partly dedicated to Hung Shing.	Not listed		
No. 31 Shui Tau Tsuen, Kam Tin 22.446344°N 114.060933°E	Hung Shing Temple Built by the Tang Clan of Kam Tin more than 500 years ago. It was rebuilt in 1984.	Grade III		
Ping Ha Road, Hang Mei Tsuen (坑尾村), Ping Shan 22.444081°N 114.008144°E	Hung Shing Temple, Ping Shan (屏山洪聖宮) Constructed by the Tang Clan residing in Ping Shan. It was first erected in 1764 during the Qianlong reign of the Qing dynasty. The existing structure was rebuilt in 1866, followed by a substantial renovation in 1963. It is part of the Ping Shan Heritage Trail.	Grade II		
Sha Kong Wai (沙江圍), Lau Fau Shan 22.4649°N 113.993132°E	Hung Shing Temple, Sha Kong Wai (元朗沙江圍洪聖公廟)	Not listed		
No. 26C Cheung Shing Street, Yuen Long Kau Hui, Yuen Long 22.447353°N 114.032434°E	Tai Wong Temple, Yuen Long Kau Hui (元朗舊墟大王廟) It was probably built between 1662 and 1722. It is the main temple of Nam Pin Wai as well as Yuen Long Kau Hui. It was built for the worship of Hung Shing and Yeung Hau. Other than for worship, the temple was a venue for solving disputes and discussing market affairs among the villagers. It also once served as a yamen and the officials lived there.	Grade I		
Wong Uk Tsuen, Yuen Long District 22.448398°N 114.037999°E	Yi Shing Temple (二聖宮), conventionally called Tai Wong Temple It is mainly for the worship of Hung Shing and Yeung Hau deities. Renovation was carried out in 1924. It still acts as an alliance temple of the Tung Tau Alliance (東頭約) formed by the seven villages next to Yuen Long Kau Hui. In the old days, the temple operated a credit society serving the alliance villages.	Nil grade		
Tung Tau Wai, Wang Chau, Yuen Long 22.45435°N 114.02778°E	I Shing Temple (橫洲二聖宮) Built in 1718. It is dedicated to Hung Shing and Che Kung.	Declared		
No. 73 Tin Liu Tsuen (田寮村), Shap Pat Heung, Yuen Long 22.432357°N 114.024733°E	Shrine of Tin Liu Tsuen Main shrine of a walled village. It is dedicated to Tai Wong, who is considered to be the protective deity of the village. Rebuilt in 1935, it lies on the central axis of the village together with the Entrance Gate.	Grade III		
Ng Lau Road (五柳路), Tuen Tsz Wai, Lam Tei, Tuen Mun District 22.420324°N 113.979252°E	Sam Shing Temple (三聖宮) Dedicated to the Marshal Yuen Tan Fuk Fu (玄壇伏虎元帥; 'Tiger Suppressing General'), Hung Shing and Hau Wong. It was rebuilt in 1993.	Nil grade		
Hung Leng, Fanling 22.513583°N 114.166569°E	Hung Shing Temple, Hung Leng (孔嶺洪聖宮) Probably built in 1763. It is the centre of the Four Yeuk (四約; 'Four Villages Alliance'), namely Loi Tung, Lung Yeuk Tau, Lin Ma Hang and Tan Chuk Hang.	Grade III		
Ho Sheung Heung (河上鄉), Sheung Shui 22.509291°N 114.107842°E	The Hung Shing Temple (洪聖古廟, left) and the Pai Fung Temple (排峰古廟, right) were originally two separate buildings built in different times. They were connected by a kitchen in the 1960s. While the construction date of the Hung Shing Temple is unknown, the oldest relics of the temple date to the 16th century. The Pai Fung Temple, originally located in Pai Fung Ling (排峰嶺), was moved to the present site in 1937.	Grade III		
Wai Loi Tsuen, Sheung Shui Wai, Sheung Shui; Items No. 219 and 220 on map: 22.509442°N 114.122267°E	Hung Shing Temple Completely modern renovation. The temple comprises two halls and a central courtyard.	Not listed		
Sha Tau (沙頭), Ping Chau 22.541289°N 114.436646°E	Tin Hau temple, Sha Tau, Tung Ping Chau Partly dedicated to Hung Shing. Built in 1765. In addition to Tin Hau, two other deities are worshipped at its side altars: Hung Shing and Tai Sui.	Grade III		
Tsing Yi Lutheran Village, Tsing Yi 22.351497°N 114.106459°E	Tai Wong Pak Kung Temple (大王伯公廟)	Not listed		
Tsang Tsui (曾咀), Tuen Mun District 22.419008°N 113.919577°E	Tsang Tsui Temple (曾咀古廟)	Not listed		
Near Kau Sai Village, southern part of the island of Kau Sai Chau, Sai Kung District 22.342353°N 114.321549°E	Hung Shing Temple, Kau Sai Chau (滘西洲洪聖古廟) Built before 1889. It is constructed in grey bricks with a timber roof frame. The temple has been renovated four times, in 1949, in the 1970s, in 1988 and the last being from August 1999 to February 2000. The restoration was declared an "Outstanding Project" by the UNESCO Asia-Pacific Heritage 2000 Awards.	Declared (2002)		
Po Toi O, Clear Water Bay Peninsula, Sai Kung District 22.275746°N 114.295827°E	Hung Shing Temple, Po Toi O (布袋澳洪聖宮) Probably built in 1663. A Kung So (公所) building adjacent to the temple was built in 1740 and was used to deal with village affairs and served as a school until the 1930s.	Grade III		
Tai Wong Kung (大王公), across Po Toi O bay from Po Toi O village, Clear Water Bay Peninsula, Sai Kung District 22.276989°N 114.294468°E	Tai Wong Temple (大王宫)	Not listed		
Tai She Wan (大蛇灣), High Island, Sai Kung District 22.35504°N 114.342122°E	Hung Shing Temple	Not listed		
Nam Tong (南堂), Tung Lung Chau 22.254963°N 114.289307°E	Hung Shing Temple, Tung Lung Chau Built before 1931. Kwun Yam and Tin Hau are housed at the altars of the left and right chambers respectively. A large rock, called Holy Rock (聖石) by the worshippers, is protruding from the rear wall of the right chamber.	Nil grade		
Sha Lo Wan, Lantau Island 22.289528°N 113.900277°E	Ba Kong Temple (把港古廟; 'guarding the bay'). Built in 1774. It is located to the right of the Tin Hau Temple, built in 1919. A wall is connecting the two temples at the front façade. (Viewed from the front, the Hung Shing Temple is on the left)	Nil grade		
Shek Tsai Po Street, Tai O, Lantau Island 22.256319°N 113.857134°E	Tai O Hung Shing Old Temple (大澳洪聖古廟) Built by the indigenous villagers in 1746.	Nil grade		
Yi O San Tsuen, Yi O, Lantau Island 22.23194°N 113.85208°E	Tai Wong To Tei Temple (大王土地廟) Origin unknown. Located next to the Hoi San Temple (海神古廟), along Lantau Trail section 7.	Not listed	p.67	
Near Tiu Pan Shek (跳板石), Lung Ngam Yin (龍岩堰) rocky beach west of Kai Kung Shan, southwest of Yi O, Lantau Island 22.22743°N 113.83994°E	Tai Wong Kung (大王宮) Small temple. Covered with a piece of metal sheeting, bent into a vault-like structure of a small boat canopy.	Not listed	p.84	
On the path between Fan Lau Fort and Fan Lau Tung Wan, Fan Lau, Lantau Island 22.19829°N 113.85341°E	Hung Shing Temple, Fan Lau (分流洪聖廟) Ruins.	Not listed	p.116	
Chung Hau (涌口), Shek Pik, Lantau Island 22.222973°N 113.895408°E	Hung Shing Temple The temple is in ruins and was described as such in 1979. It is a grey brick and granite block-built Chinese pitched roof building with three halls: the main hall and two side halls. The main hall is a two hall structure, while the side halls are one hall structures.	Not listed	p.141	
Tai Long Wan Tsuen, West of Shek Pik, Lantau Island 22.221592°N 113.886898°E	Hung Hau Temple (石壁洪侯古廟) Built in 1960. Rebuilding of the original temple in Chung Hau, Shek Pik.	Not listed	p.133	
Tong Fuk Miu Wan (塘福廟灣), Tong Fuk, Lantau Island 22.224657°N 113.928083°E	Hung Shing Temple (洪聖宮) Built by the villagers in 1803, it was renovated in 1965. Two other deities, the King of Fish Head (魚頭大王) and the King of Crystal Palace (水晶宮大王) are also enshrined.	Nil grade	picture	
Between Pui O and Mong Tung Wan (望東灣), Chi Ma Wan Peninsula, Lantau Island 22.23461°N 113.98077°E	Hung Shing Temple, Pui O (大嶼山貝澳的洪聖古廟) Built in the Ming dynasty. Repaired in 1780. Rebuilt in 1875. Reported as ruined in 1979.	Not listed		
Mui Wo, Lantau Island 22.266801°N 113.99598°E	Hung Shing Temple This temple was originally located at Chung Hau but was reconstructed at Luk Tei Tong.	Not listed		
No. 1A Chung Hing Street, Cheung Chau Wan, Cheung Chau 22.205801°N 114.028556°E	Hung Shing Temple, Cheung Chau (長洲洪聖廟) Built in 1813. Managed by the Chinese Temples Committee. The interior of the temple can be explored with Google Street View.	Grade II		
Yau Kwong Street (友光街), Peng Chau 22.285823°N 114.039509°E	Hung Shing Temple, Peng Chau (洪聖古廟) Many people on Peng Chau were historically fishermen. The west side of the island was consecrated to Tin Hau, while the east side consecrated to Hung Shing Yeh.	Not listed		
Nos. 69A & 69B, Peng Chau Wing on Street, Peng Chau 22.28558°N 114.038389°E	Tin Hau temple, Peng Chau (坪洲天后宮) Partly dedicated to Hung Shing. Built in 1792. Managed by the Chinese Temples Committee. The interior of the temple can be explored with Google Street View.	Grade II		
Shek Pai Wan (石排灣). Between Tung O and Yung Shue Ha, Lamma Island 22.19498°N 114.140997°E	Hung Shing Temple, Tung O (南丫島東澳洪聖宮). Built in 1824. It was built by the fishing and farming community in Tung O.	Nil grade		

=== Former temples ===
Several temples have been ruined and have disappeared, including:

- Temple at Fan Lau. (see details in table)
- Temple at Mui Wo. Built in the Ming dynasty, repaired in 1843. Completely disappeared as in 1979.
- Temple at Pui O. Built in the Ming dynasty. Ruined as in 1979. (see details in table)
- Temple at Shek Pik. (see details in table)
- Temple in Tung Chung, inside Tung Chung Fort. Ruined as in 1979.
- Temples at Yi O. There used to be two small Tai Wong Temples (大王宮) in the Yi O embankments area. Reported in 2025.

== Other locations ==
Location	Notes	References	Photographs
Pengjiang District, Jiangmen, Guangdong Province, China	Hong Sheng Temple (潮连洪圣殿)		
Yiu Ming Temple, 16–22 Retreat Street, Alexandria, Sydney, New South Wales, Australia. 33.902692°S 151.200677°E	Yiu Ming Temple is the only temple dedicated to Hung Shing in Australia. Constructed in the 1870s by Sydney's Chinese Community, it was rebuilt in 1908. The interior was decorated in 1909–1917. The temple was restored in 1998–1999 following a fire. It is of historical significance to Sydney's Chinese community. It is architecturally significant for its combination of Cantonese design, local Sydney materials and Federation era Australian detailing. The building is substantially intact since construction.		
Hung Shing Temple, No.31, Jln 4/48, Jalan Padang, 46050 Petaling Jaya, Selangor, Malaysia. 3.091097°N 101.643944°E	Hung Shing Temple, Petaling Jaya, Selangor was constructed in the early 1900s by Petaling Jaya Chinese Community.		

== See also ==
- Hung Shing
- Tin Hau temples in Hong Kong
- Kwan Tai temples in Hong Kong
- Places of worship in Hong Kong
