= Tai Wong Temple, Yuen Long Kau Hui =

Coordinates: 22.44734°N 114.03242°E

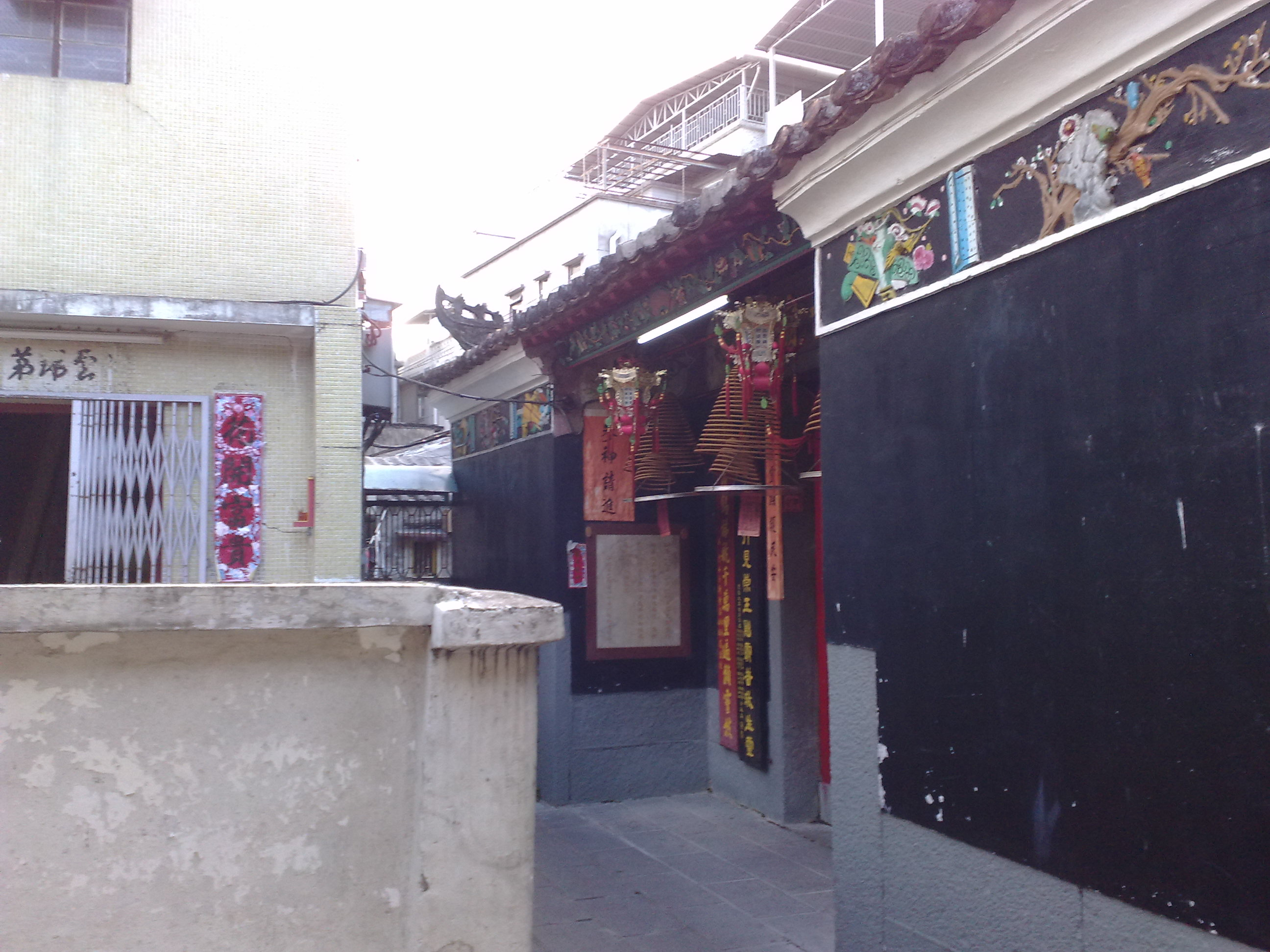
Tai Wong Temple, Yuen Long Kau Hui in 2009.

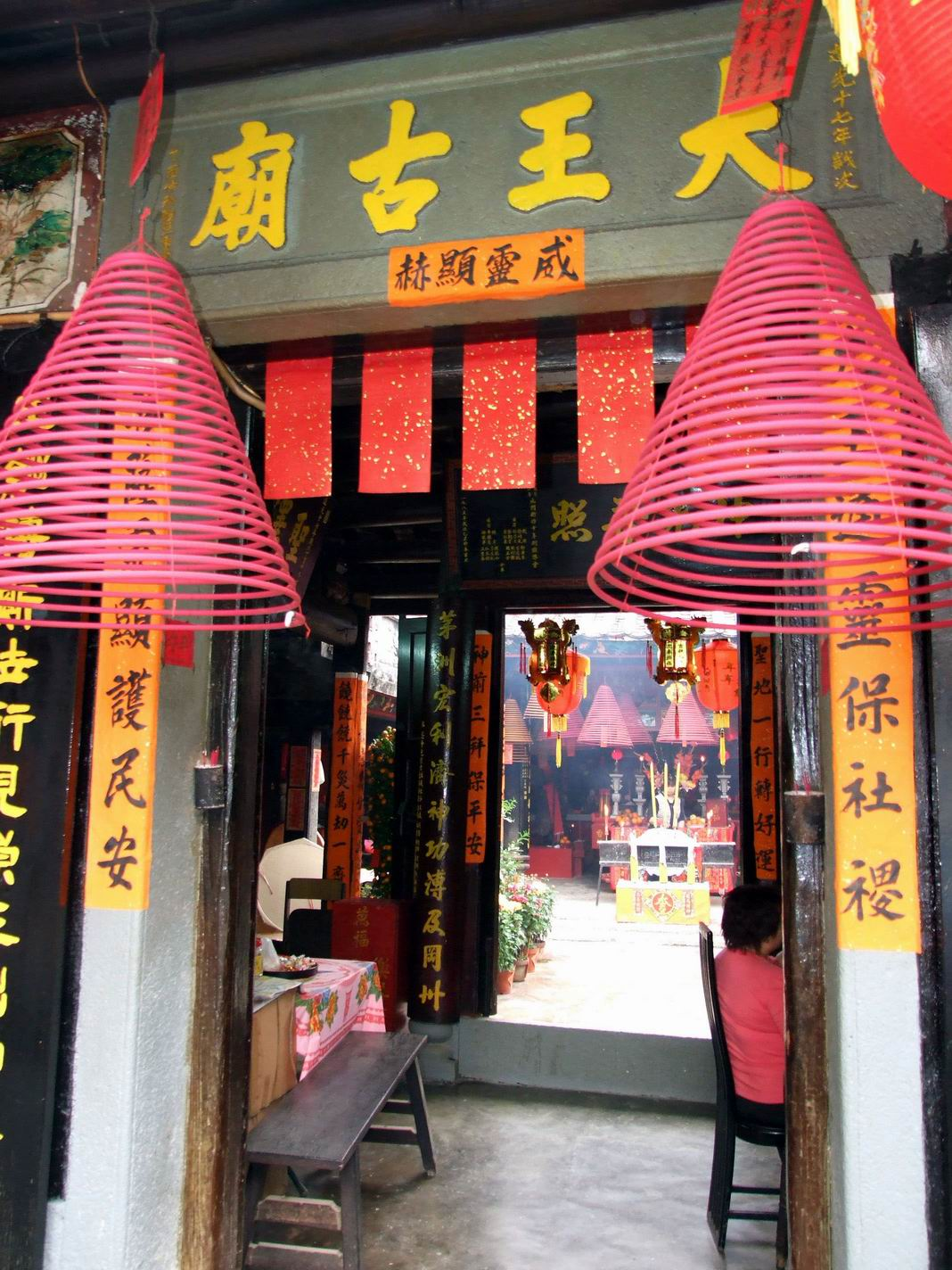
Tai Wong Temple, Yuen Long Kau Hui in 2007.

Tai Wong Temple (Chinese: 大王古廟) in Yuen Long Kau Hui (元朗舊墟; 'Yuen Long Old Market'), Yuen Long District, Hong Kong, is located in Cheung Shing Street (長城街), which was the longest and busiest street of the market.

== History ==
The temple was established at the same time as the market, during the reign of Kangxi emperor (1661-1722).

Other than for worship, the temple was a venue for solving disputes and discussing market affairs among the villagers. It also once served as a yamen and the officials lived there.

A fire broke out at the temple on the evening of October 21, 2024. The temple's roof was burned and collapsed. The fire was extinguished about an hour later. The preliminary investigation by the fire department indicated that the fire was likely caused by a short circuit in the refrigerator's electrical wiring.

== Description ==
The temple was built for the worship of two 'Tai Wong', literally 'great kings', Hung Shing Tai Wong (洪聖大王) and Yeung Hau Tai Wong (楊侯大王). It is the main temple of Nam Pin Wai as well as Yuen Long Kau Hui.

== Conservation ==
Tai Wong Temple in Yuen Long Kau Hui is listed as a Grade I Historic Building.

== See also ==
- List of Hung Shing temples in Hong Kong
- List of Yeung Hau temples in Hong Kong
