= Tong Fuk =

Village on Lantau Island

Coordinates: 22.228°N 113.933°E

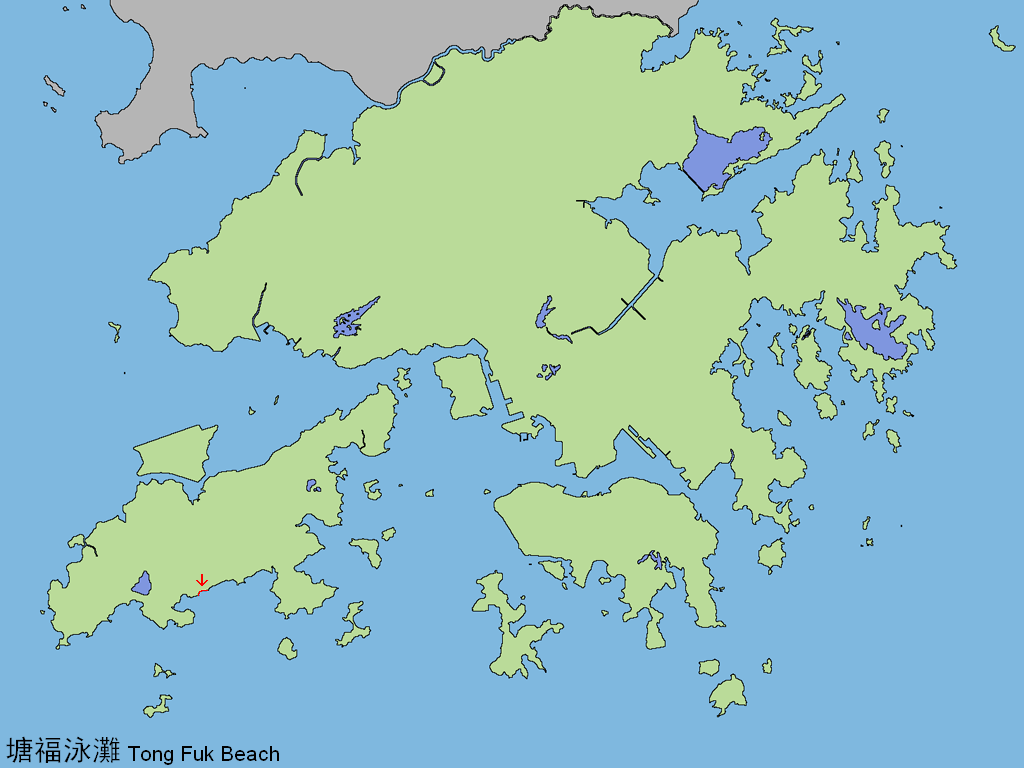
Location of Tong Fuk Beach within Hong Kong (red arrow)

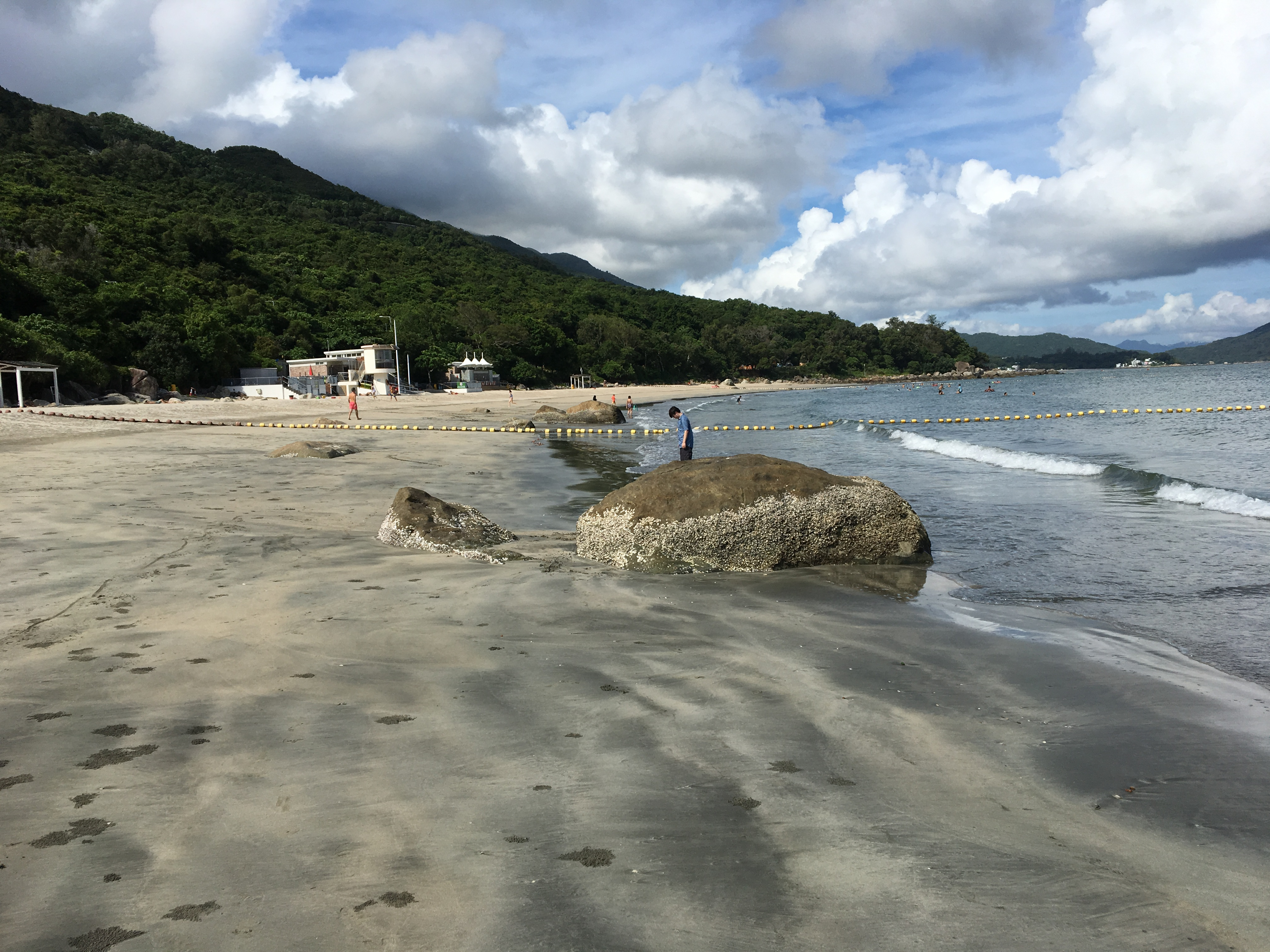
Tong Fuk Beach.

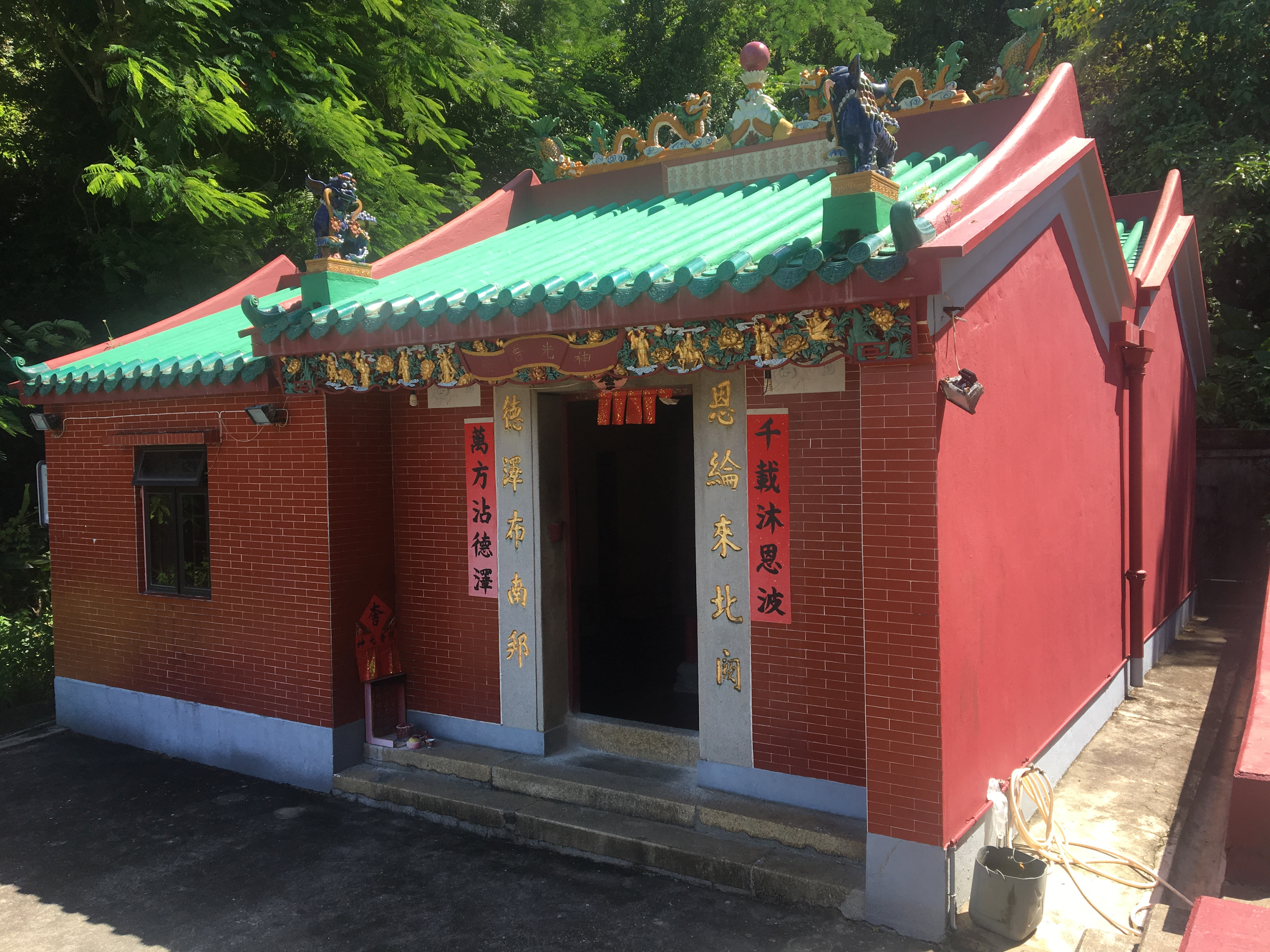
Hung Shing Temple in Tong Fuk.

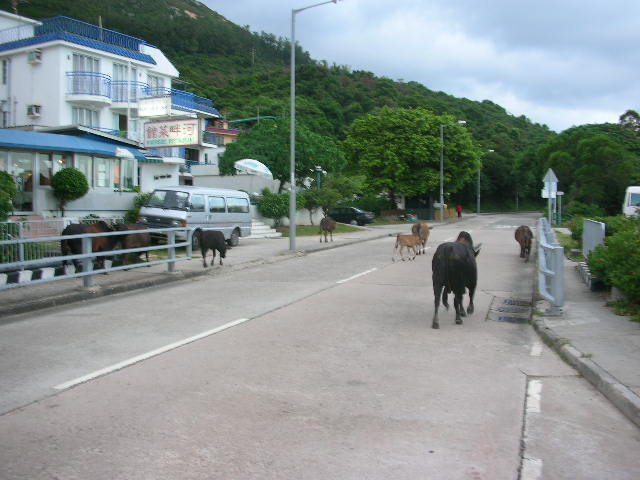
South Lantau Road at Tong Fuk.

Tong Fuk (Chinese: 塘福, formerly 塘㙏) is a village and an area on Lantau Island in Hong Kong. It is a popular place for holiday recreation. Tong Fuk Beach, to the south of the village, is a popular local attraction alongside the other beaches of South Lantau.

== Administration ==
Tong Fuk is a recognized village under the New Territories Small House Policy. Tong Fuk is one of the villages represented within the South Lantao Rural Committee. For electoral purposes, Tong Fuk is part of the Lantau constituency, which is currently represented by Randy Yu Hon-kwan.

== History ==
The original Tong Fuk Tsuen was composed of indigenous inhabitants of Chan (陳) and Tang (鄧) clans who settled in the Wanli (萬曆, 1572–1620) reign of the Ming dynasty. The Chan coming from Sha Lo Wan in North Lantau, whilst the Tang originated from Tuen Mun. Most of the indigenous inhabitants were fishermen and farmers who worshiped Hung Shing, a Chinese folk religion deity.

== Geography ==
Several rivers and streams run through Tong Fuk, making it suitable for cultivation. The main river runs through the west of the village. Across the main river is Ma Po Ping (蔴埔坪). It is sometimes regarded as part of Tong Fuk. South of Ma Po Ping is a bay named Tong Fuk Miu Wan (塘福廟灣; 'Tong Fung Temple Bay').

Tong Fuk Beach, to the south of the village, is a local attraction, where visitors rent village houses for leisure. The beach has been featured on a list of eight hidden beaches to discover in Hong Kong by CNN, who said it offers “the best of both worlds,” as it is within walking distance of popular beach bars, while also being far enough away to enjoy some seclusion with “firm gray sand, clean water and spectacular sunsets.”. Unlike neighbouring Cheung Sha Beach, there are no shops, restaurants or bars located at Tong Fuk Beach.

== Features ==
A Hung Shing Temple is located at the eastern end of Tong Fuk Miu Wan. It was built by the villagers in 1803 and gave its name to the bay. The temple was renovated in 1965. Two other deities, the King of Fish Head (魚頭大王) and the King of Crystal Palace (水晶宮大王) are also enshrined. The temple is not a graded historic building.

Beside the temple is Tong Fuk Submarine Cable Station and South Lantau Submarine Cable Station, where telecommunication cables link various destinations across the South China Sea. The former Ma Po Ping Prison is located at Ma Po Ping.

There are a number of holiday residences in Tong Fuk Village, and the village houses a multicultural community of over twenty nationalities from all over the world living alongside neighbours from the indigenous village clans. There are also local corner shops and restaurants. The Gallery bar and restaurant, located opposite the bus terminus, has been running since 1983 and is a popular local establishment.

== Transport ==
Tong Fuk is on South Lantau Road. Bus routes from Ngong Ping and Tai O at the west to Mui Wo and Tung Chung at the east pass through Tong Fuk. The bus routes are run by New Lantao Bus.

The village is served by New Lantao Bus routes 1, 4, and 2 from Mui Wo and routes 11, 11A and 23 from Tung Chung.

A taxi stand for pickup and drop-off is located at the Tong Fuk Bus Terminus. Only blue Lantau taxis can be hired on Lantau Island.

== See also ==
- Beaches of Hong Kong
