= Hung Shing Temple (Kau Sai Chau) =

Temple in Hong Kong

Coordinates: 22°20′32″N 114°19′18″E

Hung Shing Temple, Kau Sai Chau
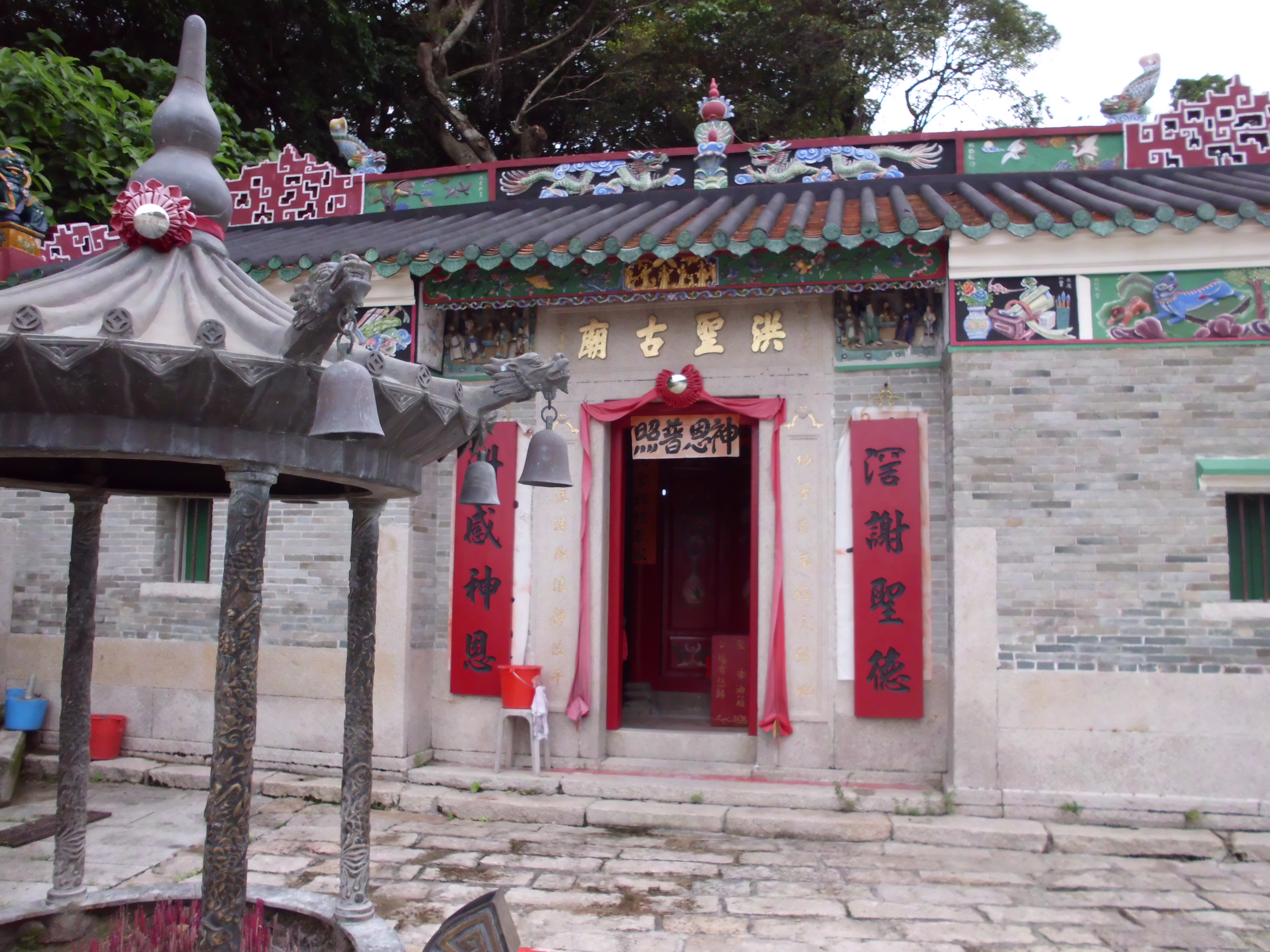
- Hung Shing Temple, Kau Sai Chau
- Interactive map of Hung Shing Temple, Kau Sai Chau
- Location: Kau Sai Chau, Sai Kung District, New Territories, Hong Kong

History
- Built: 1889

Declared Monument of Hong Kong
- Designated: November 15th, 2002

Hung Shing Temple, Kau Sai Chau (Chinese: 滘西洲洪圣古庙), is a Hung Shing Temple located in Kau Sai Chau, Hong Kong. The temple was built to honor Hung Shing, a Chinese folk religion deity who is worshipped as the God of Southern Sea and believed to provide protection at sea.

Every year, celebrations are held by local residents in front of the temple on the birthday of Hung Shing (Chinese: 洪聖誕).

== History ==
According to the stone tablet in the temple, Hung Shing Temple was built before 1889 during the Qing dynasty. It is believed that the local community dependent on fishing funded the construction of the temple by donations.

The temple underwent renovation in 1999 to be restored to its original appearance. The renovation was funded by The Hong Kong Jockey Club, and was completed the following year.

In 2000, it won the Outstanding Project Award of UNESCO Asia-Pacific Awards for Cultural Heritage Conservation, and is now listed as a declared monument of Hong Kong.

In 2002, the Hong Kong Antiquities and Monuments Office designated the temple as a declared monument of Hong Kong.

== Architecture ==
The Hung Shing Temple has a traditional two-hall, three-bay structure. An entrance screen is situated in the entrance hall. The altar of the main hall is dedicated to Hung Shing, Cai Bo Xing Jun (one of the Civil Wealth Gods), and Shuixian Zunwang.
