= Nam Pin Wai =

Nam Pin Wai (南邊圍), sometimes transliterated as Nam Bin Wai is the name of several villages in Hong Kong:

- Nam Pin Wai (Sai Kung), in the Ho Chung area of Sai Kung
- Nam Pin Wai (Yuen Long), in the Yuen Long Kau Hui area of Yuen Long
