= Loi Tung =

Village in Hong Kong

Coordinates: 22.514732°N 114.167813°E

- Traditional Chinese: 萊洞
- Cantonese Yale: lòih duhng
Transcriptions
Yue: Cantonese
- Yale Romanization: lòih duhng
- Jyutping: loi4 dung6

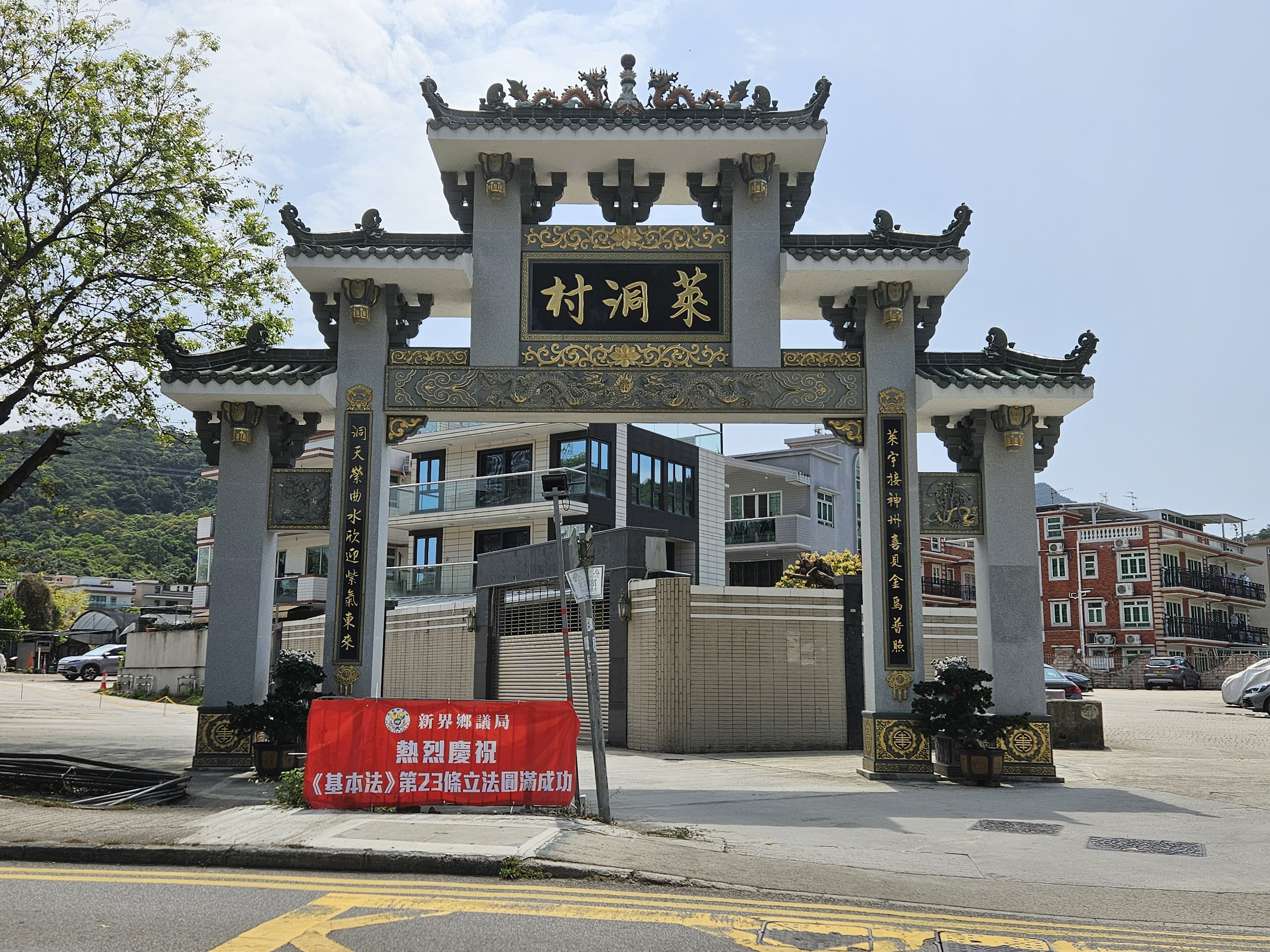
Paifang of Loi Tung Tsuen.

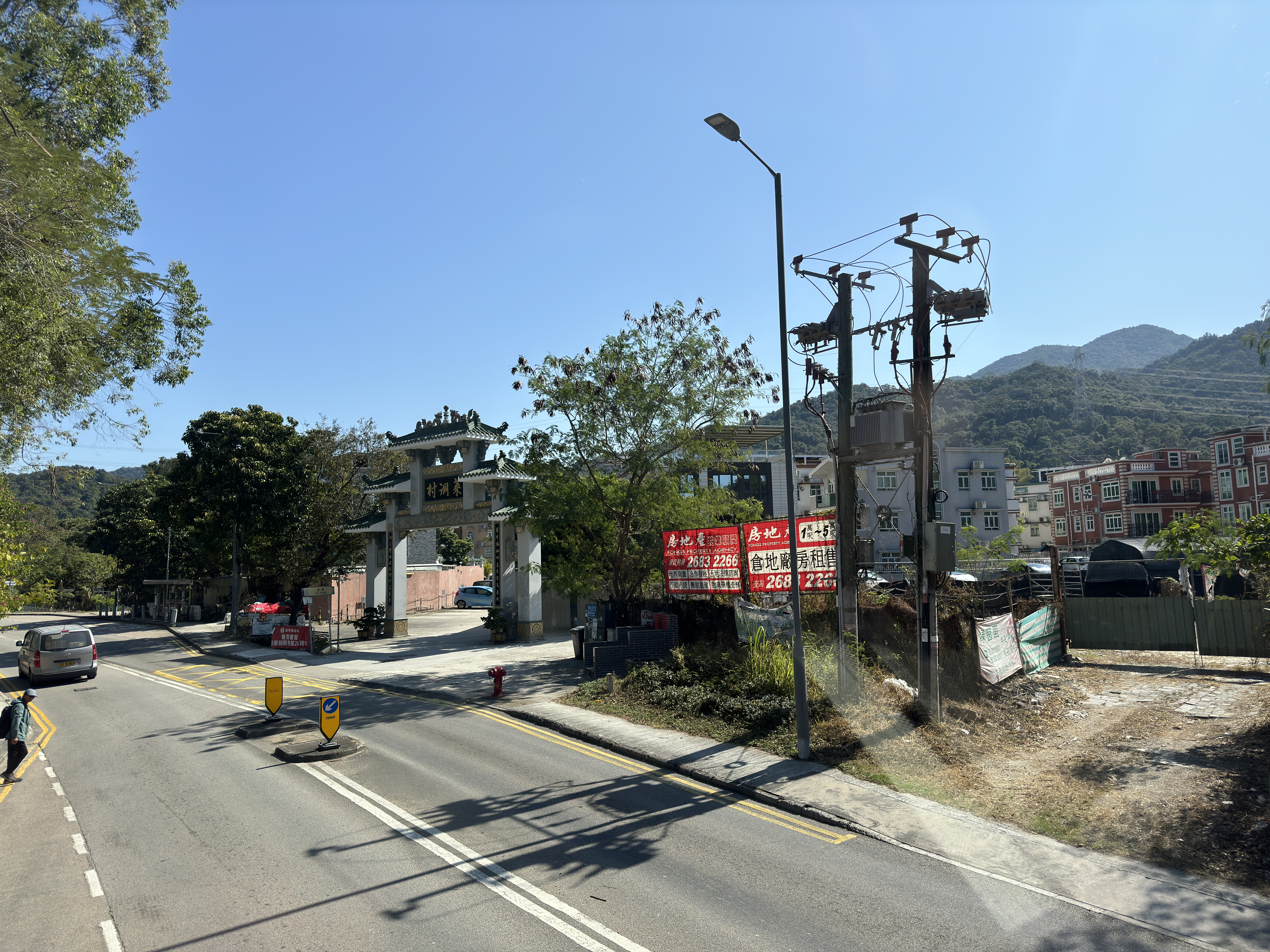
Sha Tau Kok Road at Loi Tung

Loi Tung (Chinese: 萊洞) is a village in Sha Tau Kok, North District, Hong Kong.

== Administration ==
Loi Tung is a recognized village under the New Territories Small House Policy. It is one of the villages represented within the Sha Tau Kok District Rural Committee. For electoral purposes, Loi Tung is part of the Sha Ta constituency, which is currently represented by Ko Wai-kei.

== History ==
The name "Loi Tung" was originally called "Lei Tung"(黎洞) as people with the surname "Lei" (黎) originally had this place, breaking Lei Tung into upper and lower, in which lower Lei Tung is modern Tai Tong Wu. After the Second World War, the Tangs told the Japanese that Lower Lei Tong was called "Tai Tong Wu", and the name has been used since.

Loi Tung is part of the Four Yeuk (四約; 'Four Villages Alliance'), which comprises Loi Tung, Lung Yeuk Tau, Lin Ma Hang and Tan Chuk Hang. The centre of the Alliance is the Hung Shing Temple at Hung Leng.

At the time of the 1911 census, the population of Loi Tung was 191. The number of males was 107.

Loi Tung was served by the Loi Tung station of the former Sha Tau Kok Railway, which was in operation from 1911 to 1928. Loi Tung station was opened in February 1916.

The village has the surname Tang (鄧; also romanized as 'Deng')

== Features ==
- Ting Yat Study Hall
- Wan Gau Study Hall
