= Tong Fuk Beach =

Beach in Lantau Island, New Territories, Hong Kong

- Beach
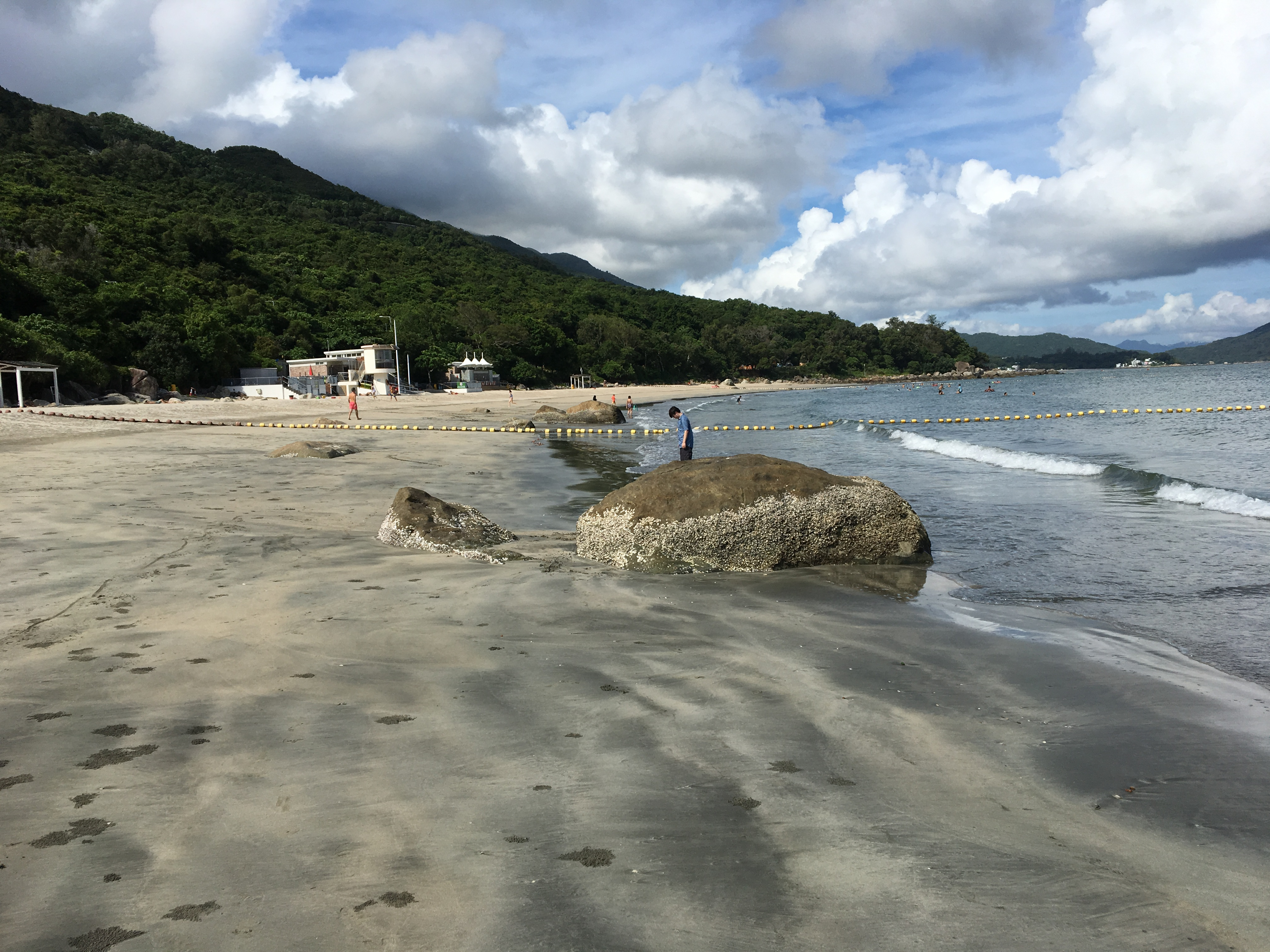
- Tong Fuk Beach

- Location within Hong Kong
- Coordinates: 22.22808°N 113.93535°E
- Location: Tong Fuk, Lantau Island

Dimensions
  - Length: 150 m (490 ft)
- Patrolled by: Leisure and Cultural Services Department

Tong Fuk Beach
- Traditional Chinese: 塘福泳灘
- Simplified Chinese: 塘福泳滩
Transcriptions
Standard Mandarin
- Hanyu Pinyin: Táng Fú Yǒng Tān
Yue: Cantonese
- Jyutping: tong4 fuk1 wing6 taan1

Tong Fuk Beach is a gazetted beach located on South Lantau Road in Tong Fuk, Lantau Island, Hong Kong. The beach is managed by the Leisure and Cultural Services Department of the Hong Kong Government. The beach is 150 metres long and is rated as good to fair by the Environmental Protection Department for its water quality in the past twenty years. It is a popular holiday resort in Lantau Island.

== History ==
On 21 December 2018, a carcass of a subadult female finless porpoise was found by Ocean Park personnel at the beach that caused it to be temporarily closed. The Ocean Park Conservation Foundation had transported the finless porpoise back to Ocean Park for autopsy.

On 15 January 2019, another carcass of an adult female finless porpoise was found by Ocean Park personnel at the beach that caused it to be temporarily closed. She was stranded as a third-degree moderate decay and had obvious wounds on her tail. The Ocean Park Conservation Foundation had transported the finless porpoise back to Ocean Park for further testing.

Tong Fuk Beach was featured in 2018 on a list of eight hidden beaches to discover in Hong Kong by CNN, who said it offers “the best of both worlds,” as it is within walking distance of popular beach bars, while also being far enough away to enjoy some seclusion with “firm gray sand, clean water and spectacular sunsets.”

== Usage ==
The beach is a popular holiday resort in Lantau Island. It offers beautiful views of Cha Kwo Chau as well as Shek Kwu Chau.

== Features ==
The beach has the following features:

- Changing rooms
- Showers
- Toilets

== See also ==
- Beaches of Hong Kong
