= Po Toi O =

Village in Hong Kong

Coordinates: 22.275724°N 114.295737°E

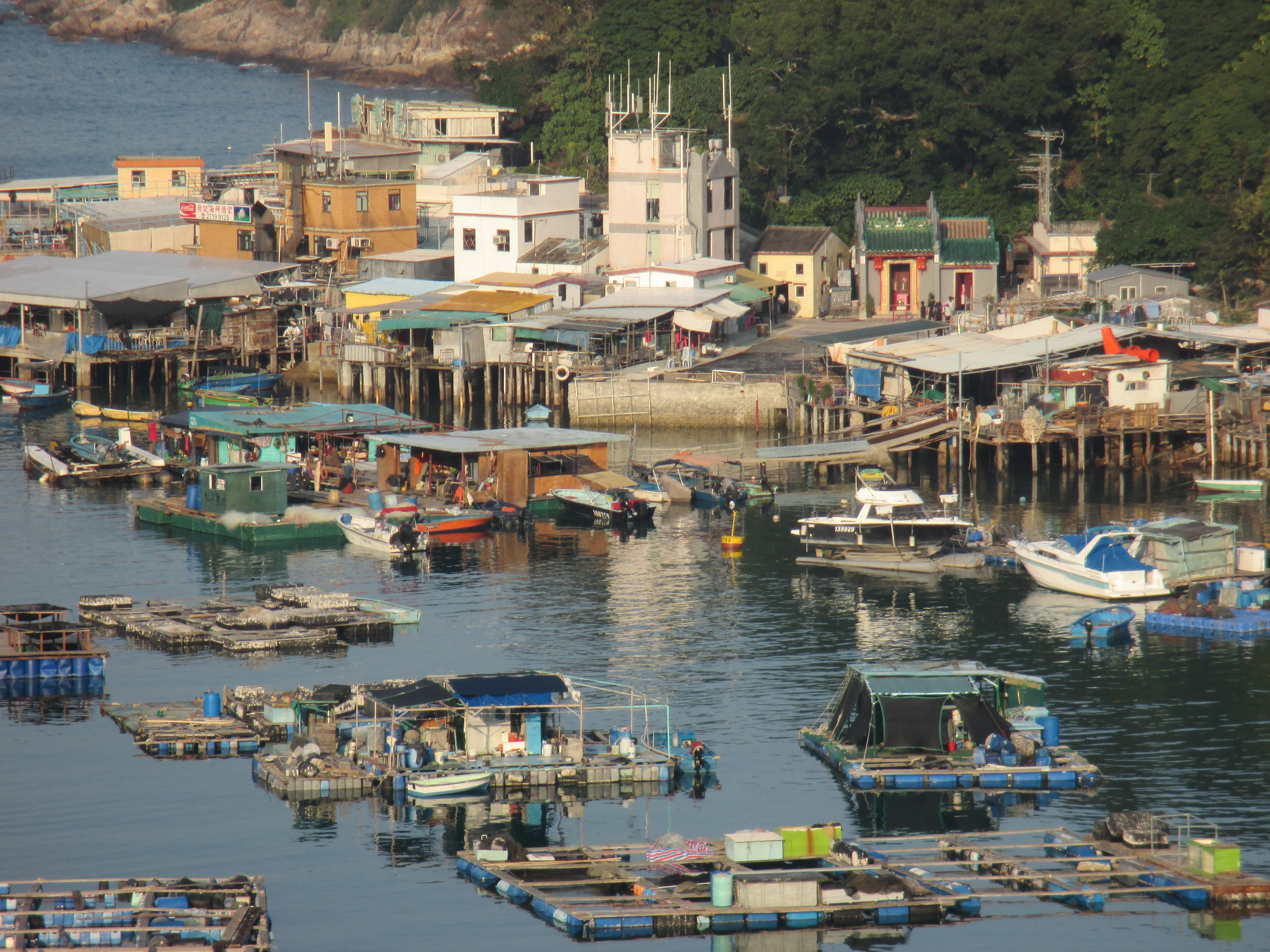
Po Toi O.

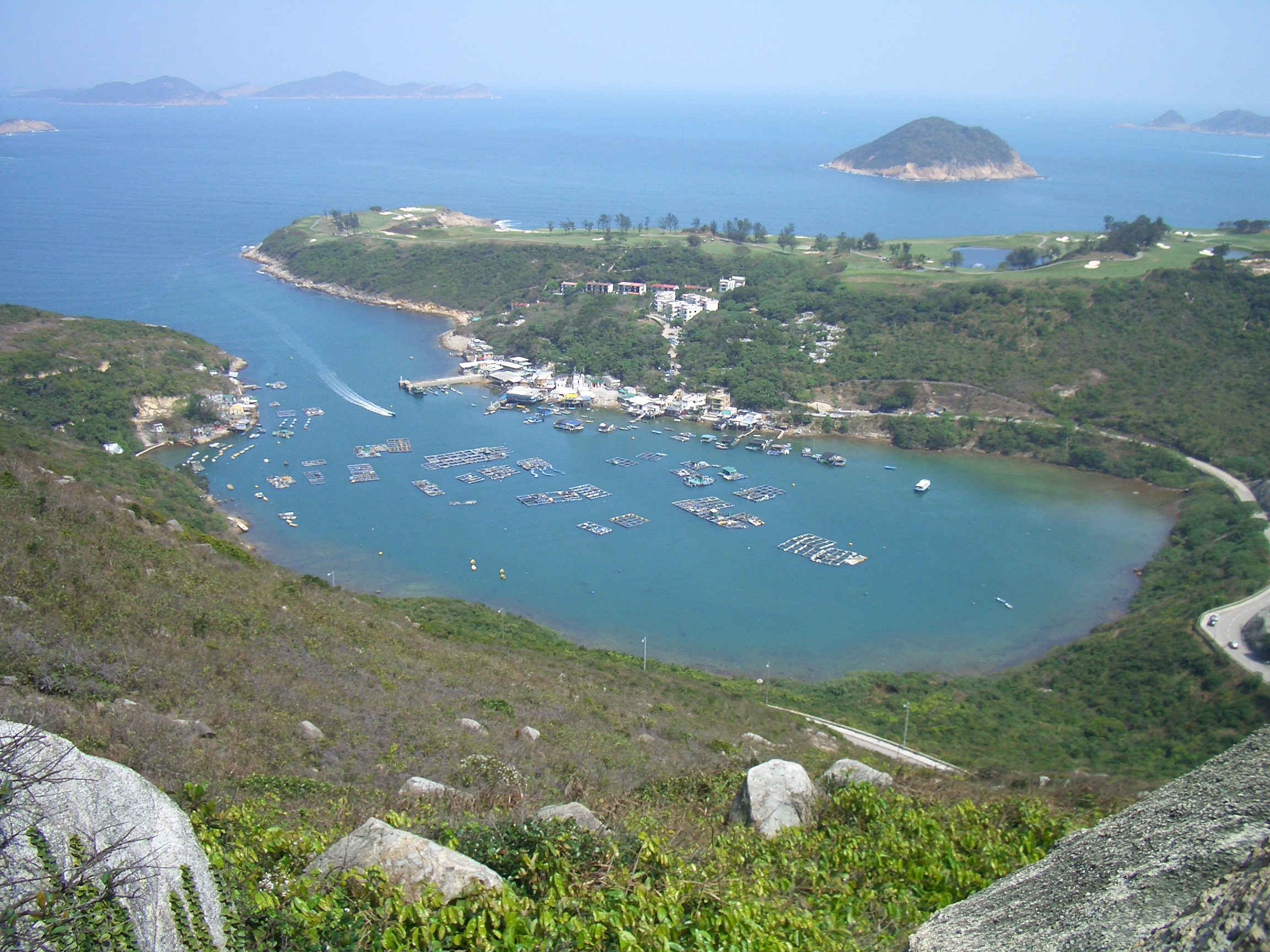
Po Toi O from higher perspective.

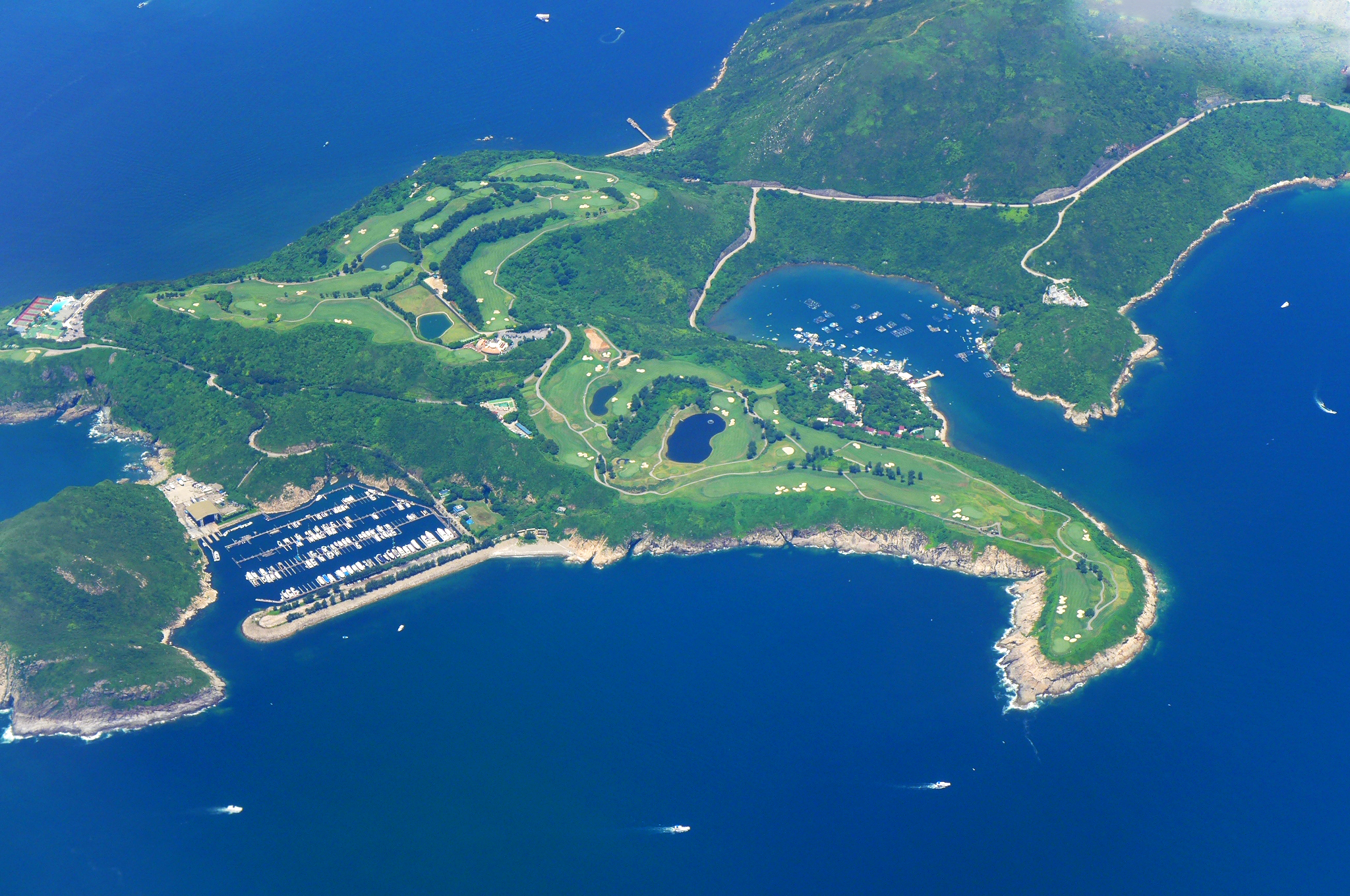
Po Toi O and Clear Water Bay Golf Course.

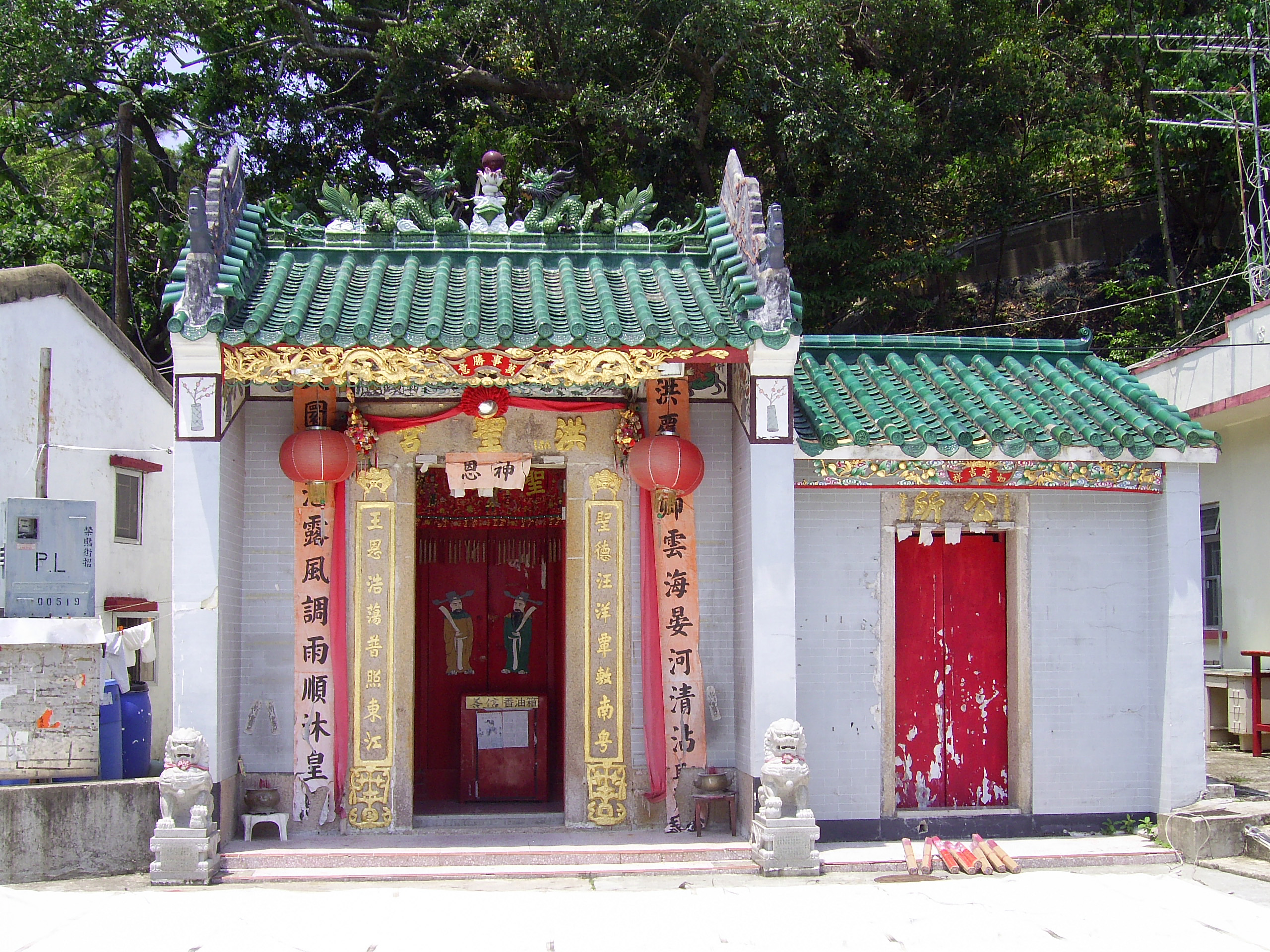
Hung Shing Temple of Po Toi O (left) and adjacent Kung So (right).

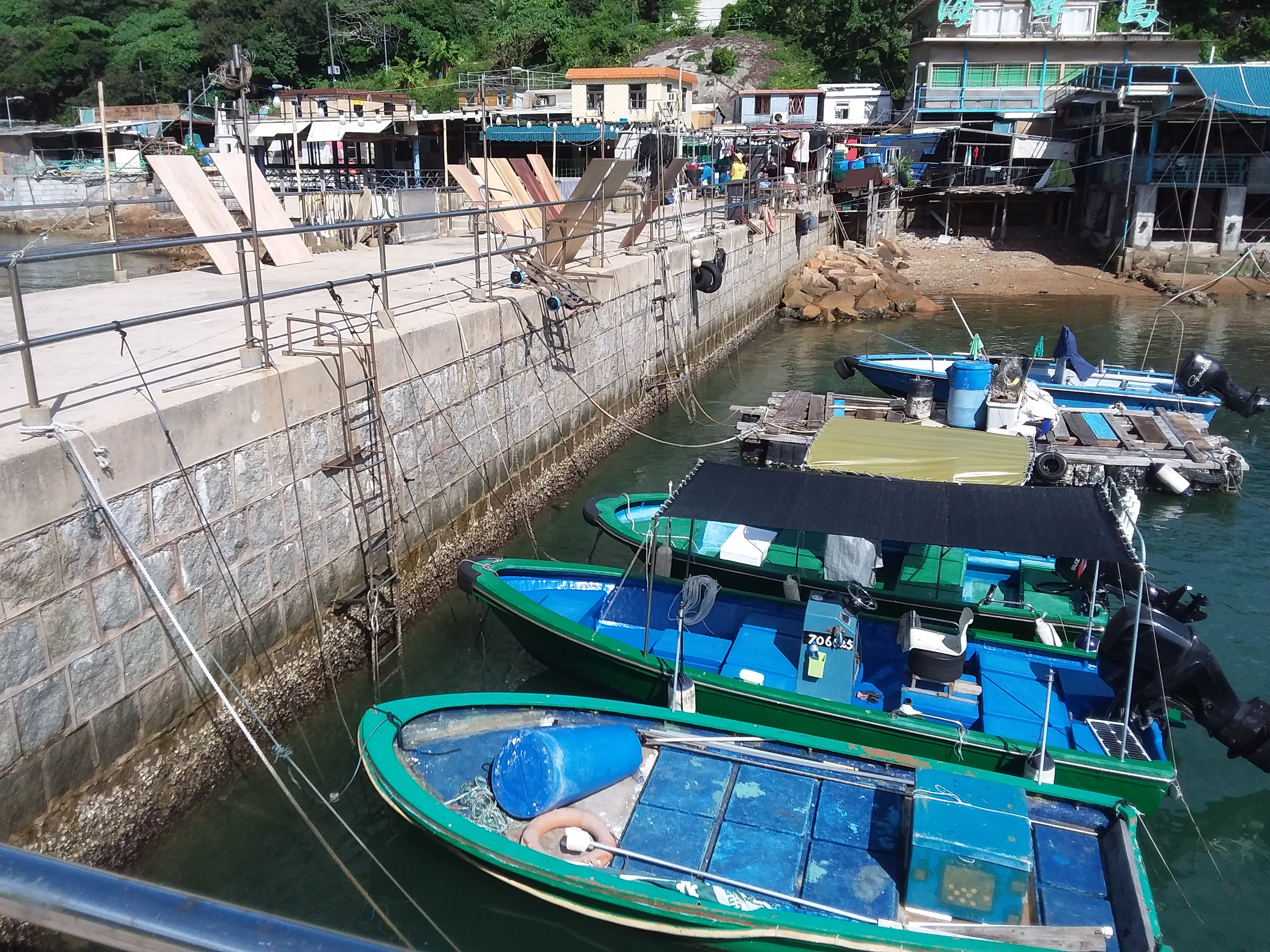
Po Toi O Pier.

Po Toi O (Chinese: 布袋澳; lit. 'Cloth Pouch Bay') is a small fishing village and a bay at Clear Water Bay Peninsula, Sai Kung, New Territories, Hong Kong.

The village is situated at a bay shaped like a sack, thus earning its name Po Toi (meaning a "sack").

== Administration ==
Po Toi O is a recognized village under the New Territories Small House Policy.

== History ==
Po Toi O was historically a multi-clan village with surnames Cheung (張), Chan (陳), Chong (莊) and others.

== Features ==
This small fishing village has two seafood restaurants and is popular with tourists.

There is a Hung Shing Temple in Po Toi O. The temple was probably built in 1663. A Kung So (公所) building adjacent to the temple was built in 1740 and was used to deal with village affairs and served as a school until the 1930s. The temple is a Grade III historic building.

== In popular culture ==
- Parts of the Hollywood movie Lara Croft: Tomb Raider – The Cradle of Life were filmed here.
- Australian celebrity chef Kylie Kwong visited Po Toi O for an episode of the TV series Kylie Kwong: Simply Magic. The episode was called "Hong Kong Island Hideaway".
- In the 2018 ITV TV miniseries Strangers, an apartment owned by a murder victim in Po Toi O proves important to the plot.

== Transportation ==
Po Toi O can be reached by land using Po Toi O Chuen Road (布袋澳村路). The village is served by green minibus 16 - Po Lam, Tseung Kwan O to Po Toi O.
