= Hung Leng =

Village in Hong Kong

Coordinates: 22.514732°N 114.167813°E

- Traditional Chinese: 孔嶺
Transcriptions
Yue: Cantonese
- Yale Romanization: húng léhng
- Jyutping: hung2 leng5

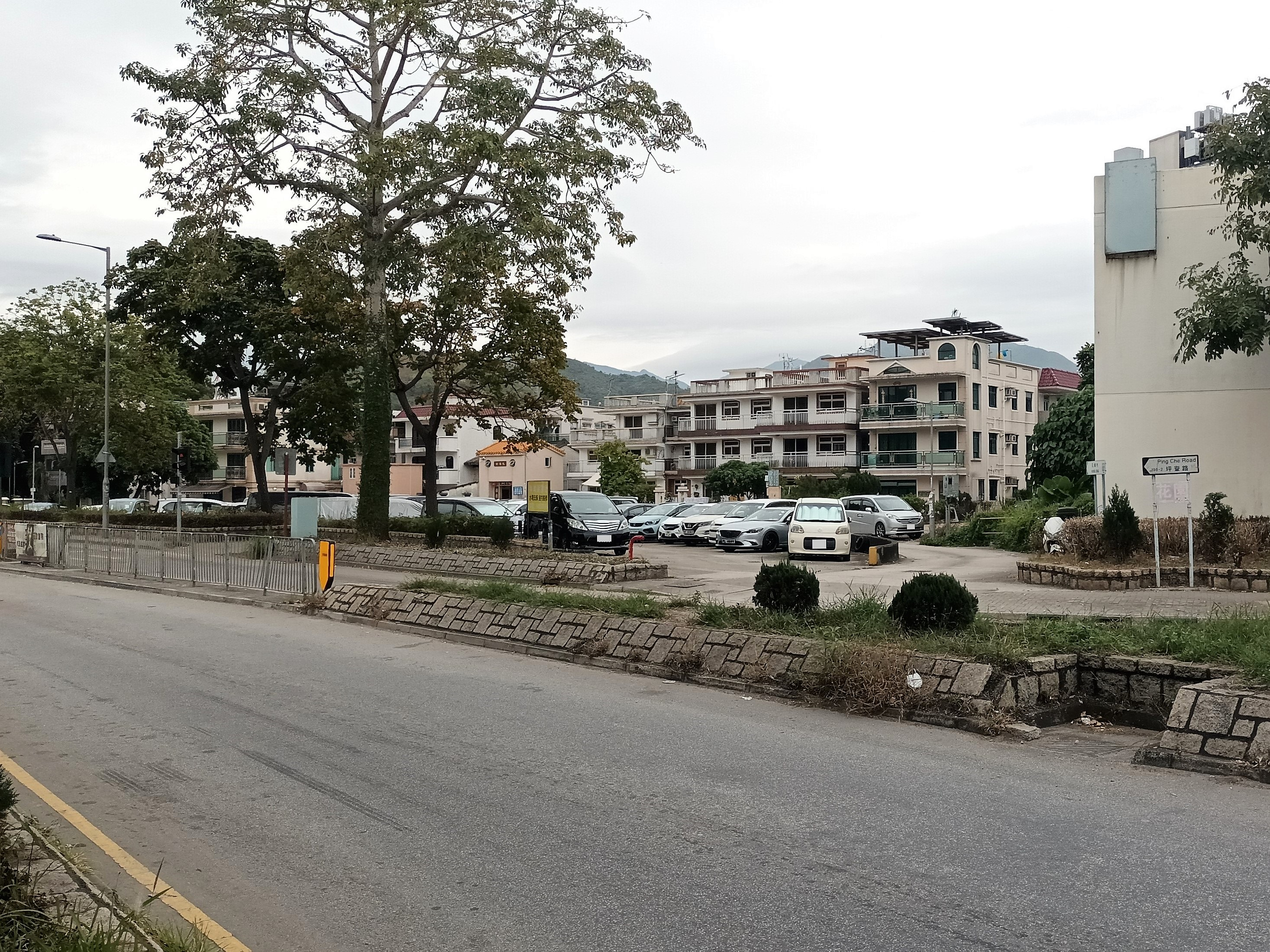
Ping Che Road (坪輋路) near Hung Leng walled village.

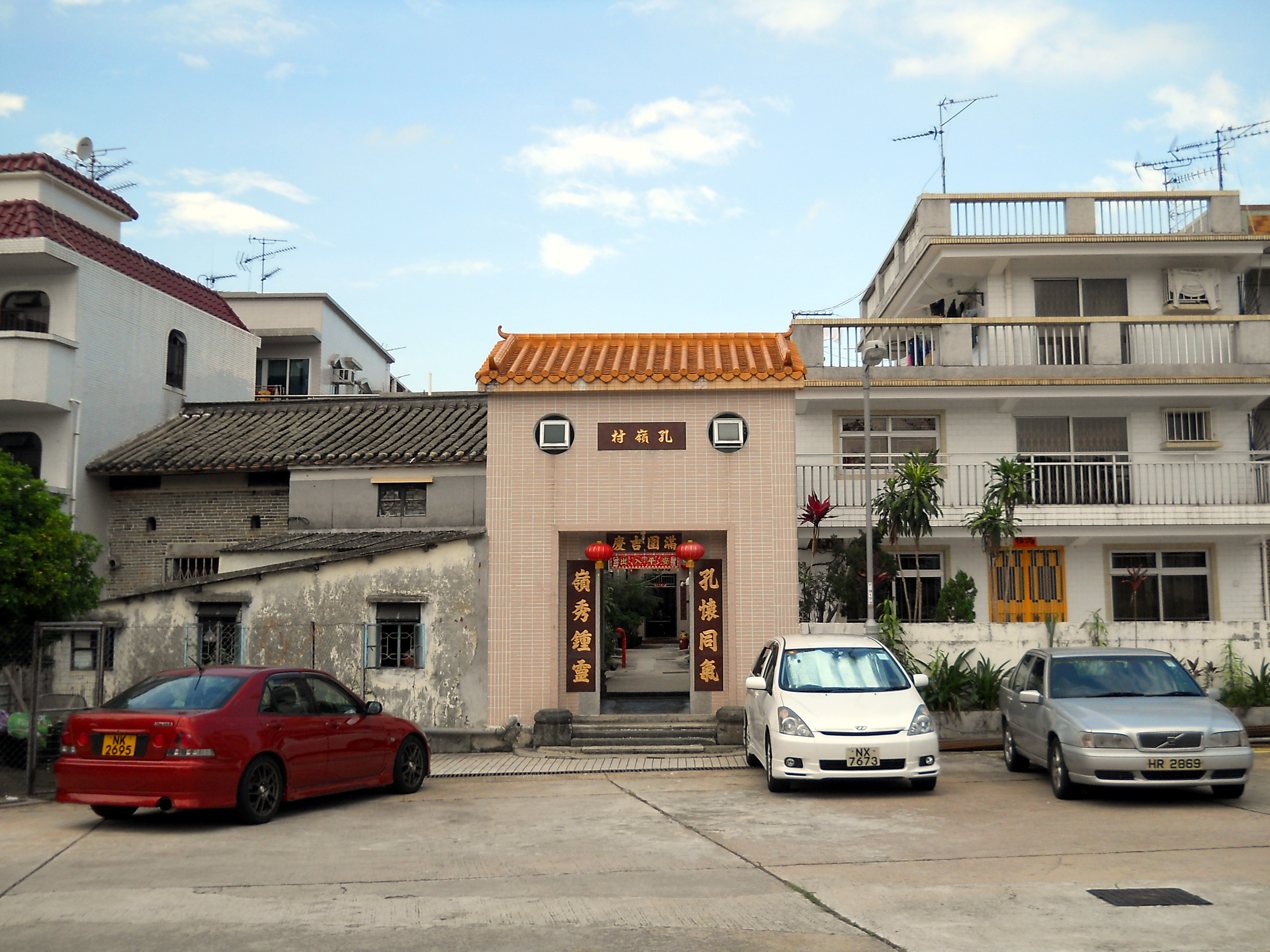
Entrance gate of Hung Leng walled village.

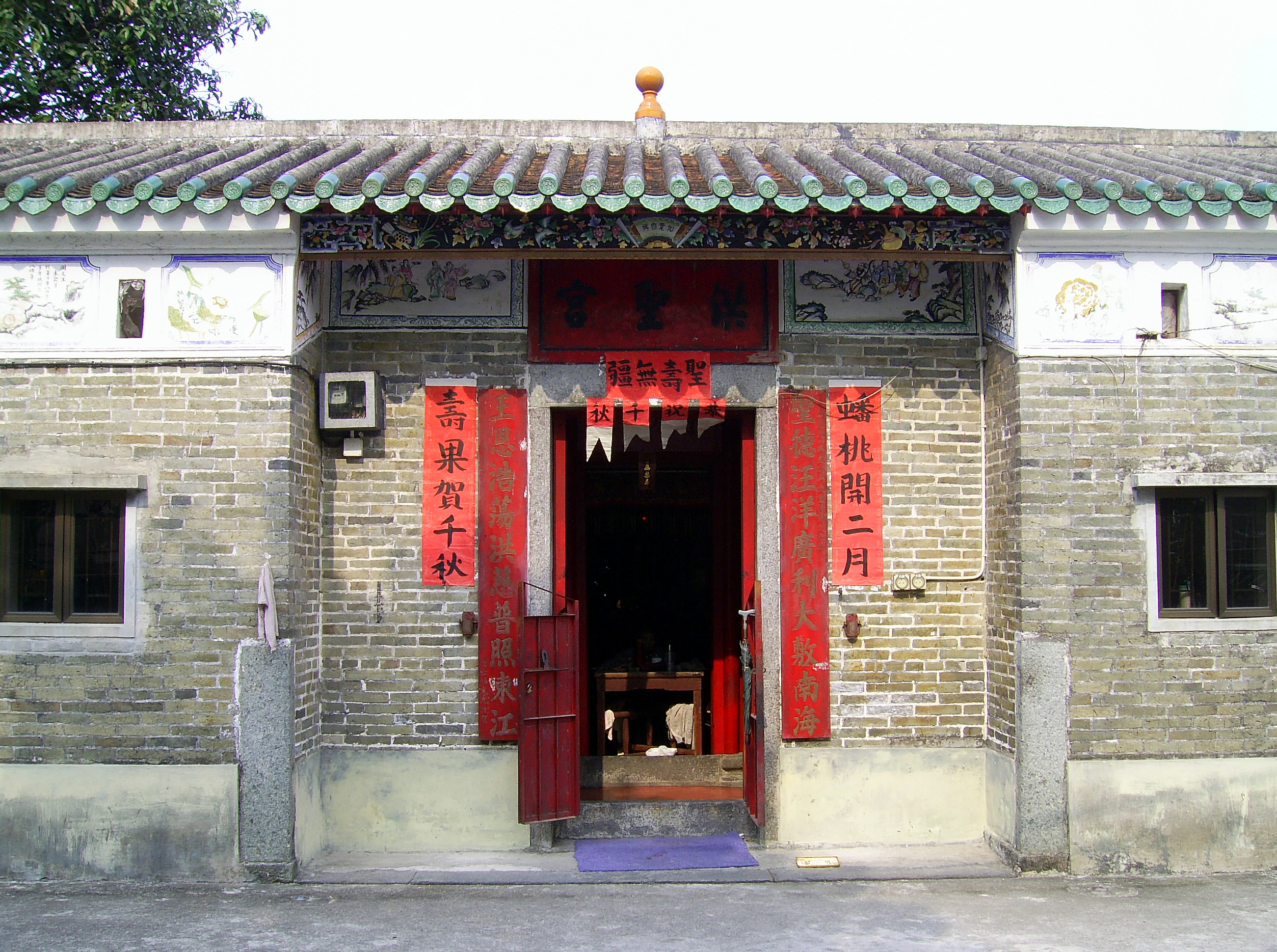
Hung Shing Temple in Hung Leng.

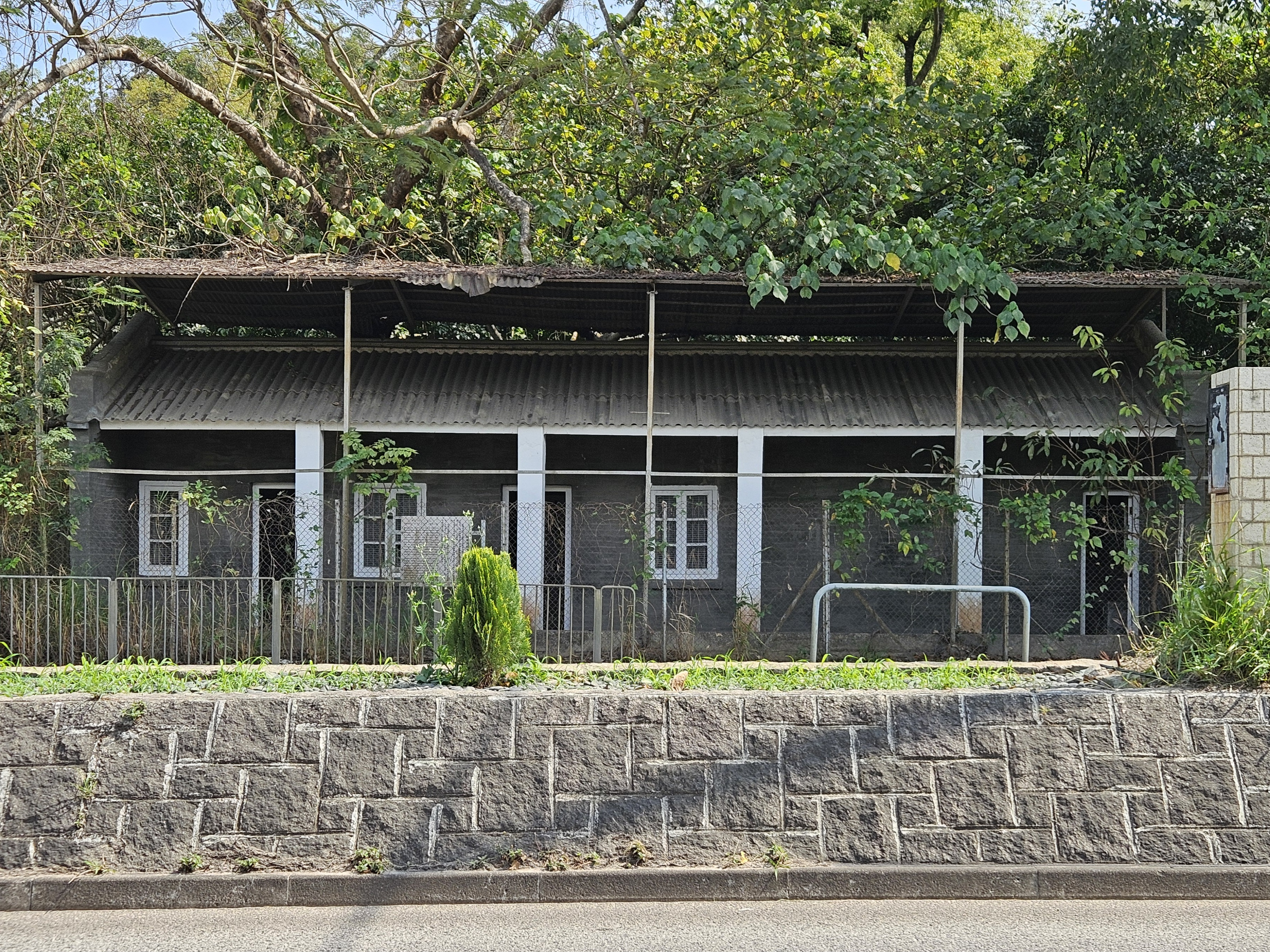
Former Hung Leng station of the former Sha Tau Kok Railway.

Hung Leng (Chinese: 孔嶺) is a village of Hong Kong, located in Fanling, North District. Part of the village is a historic walled village.

== Administration ==
Hung Leng is a recognized village under the New Territories Small House Policy. It is a recognized village under the New Territories Small House Policy. It is one of the villages represented within the Fanling District Rural Committee. For electoral purposes, Hung Leng is part of the Queen's Hill constituency, which is currently represented by Law Ting-tak.

== History ==
Hung Leng was historically a Punti walled village founded by members of the Hau (侯) clan. It was called Kuk Fung Leng (谷豐嶺) at that time.

Hung Leng was served by the Hung Leng station of the former Sha Tau Kok Railway, which was in operation from 1911 to 1928. Hung Leng station was opened on 21 December 1911.

== Features ==
The Hung Shing Temple of Hung Leng was probably built in 1763. It is the centre of the Four Yeuk (四約; four villages alliance), namely Loi Tung, Lung Yeuk Tau, Lin Ma Hang and Tan Chuk Hang.

== Conservation ==
The former Hung Leng station building and the Hung Shing Temple of Hung Leng are listed as Grade III historic buildings.
