= Tan Chuk Hang =

Village in Hong Kong

Coordinates: 22.513210°N 114.175967°E

- Chinese: 丹竹坑
- Cantonese Yale: dāan jūk hāang
Transcriptions
Yue: Cantonese
- Yale Romanization: dāan jūk hāang
- Jyutping: daan1 zuk1 haang1

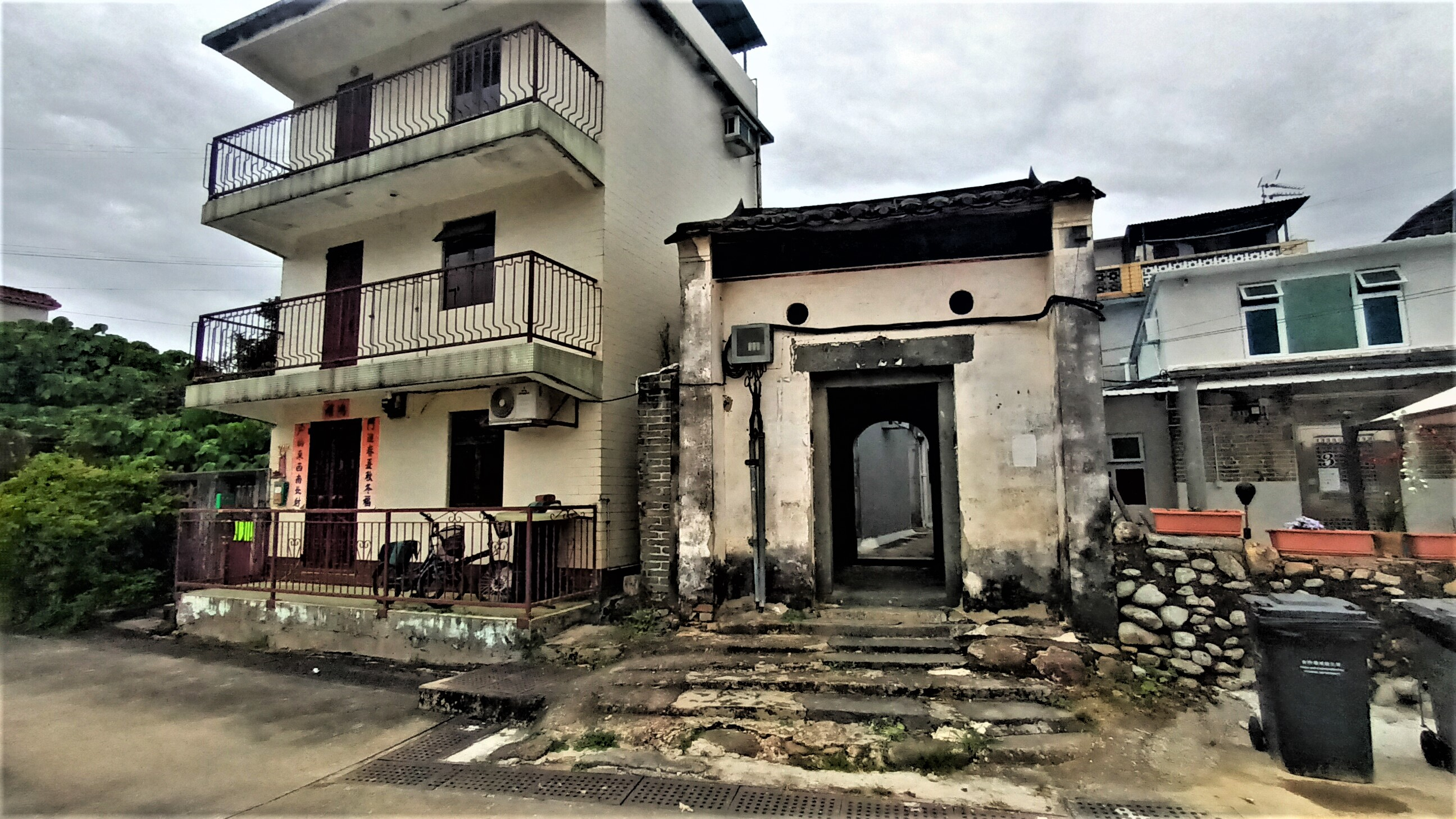
Entrance gate of Tan Chuk Hang Lo Wai.

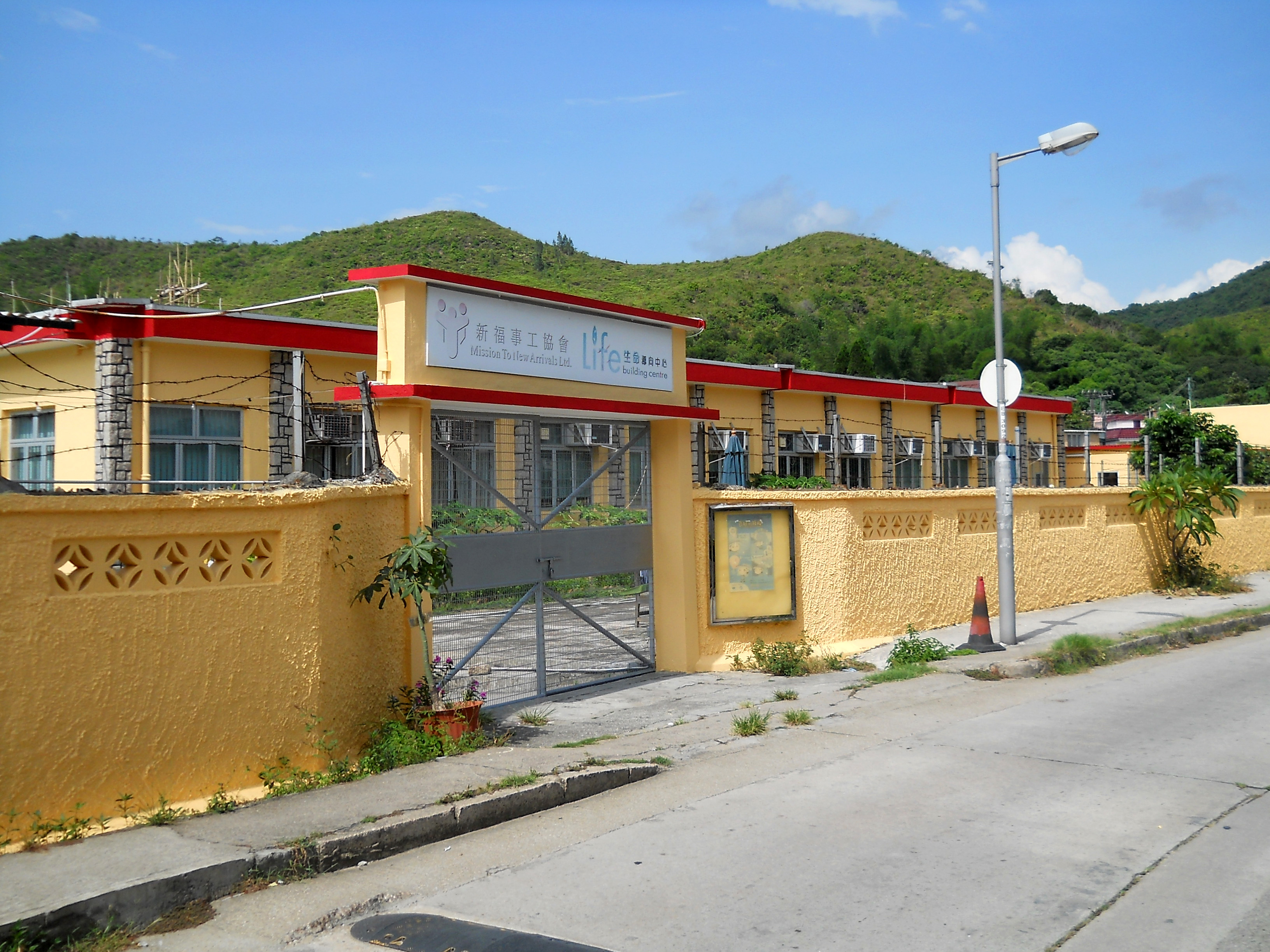
Tan Chuk Hang Public School

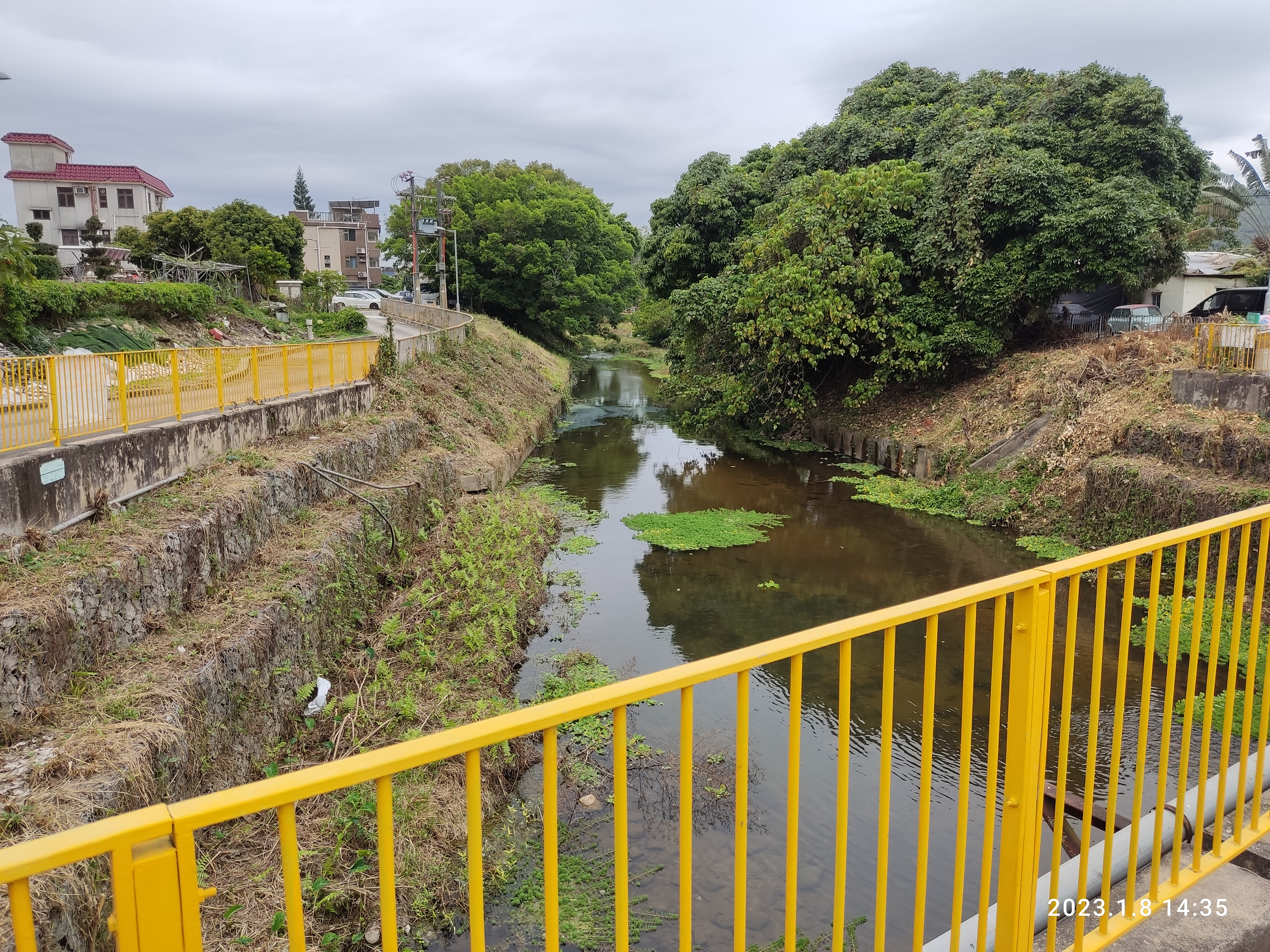
Tan Shan River in Tan Chuk Hang Lo Wai.

Tan Chuk Hang (Chinese: 丹竹坑) is a village of Hong Kong, located in Fanling, North District. It comprises Tan Chuk Hang Lo Wai (丹竹坑老圍; 'Tan Chuk Hang Old Village') and Tan Chuk Hang San Wai (丹竹坑新圍; 'Tan Chuk Hang New Village') aka. Sheung Tan Chuk Hang (上丹竹坑; 'Upper Tan Chuk Hang').

== Administration ==
Tan Chuk Hang is a recognized village under the New Territories Small House Policy. For electoral purposes, it is part of the Queen's Hill constituency of the North District Council. It is currently represented by Law Ting-tak, who was elected in the local elections.

== History ==
Tan Chuk Hang Lo Wai is a walled village that appeared in the 1688 edition of the Gazetteer of Xin'an County. It was therefore probably established before 1688.

Tan Chuk Hang is part of the Four Yeuk (四約; 'Four Villages Alliance'), which comprises Loi Tung, Lung Yeuk Tau, Lin Ma Hang and Tan Chuk Hang. The centre of the Alliance is the Hung Shing Temple at Hung Leng.

At the time of the 1911 census, the population of Sheung Tan Chuk Hang was 102. The number of males was 43.

== See also ==
- Walled villages of Hong Kong
