= Yi O =

Village on Lantau island, Hong Kong

Coordinates: 22.224851°N 113.848273°E

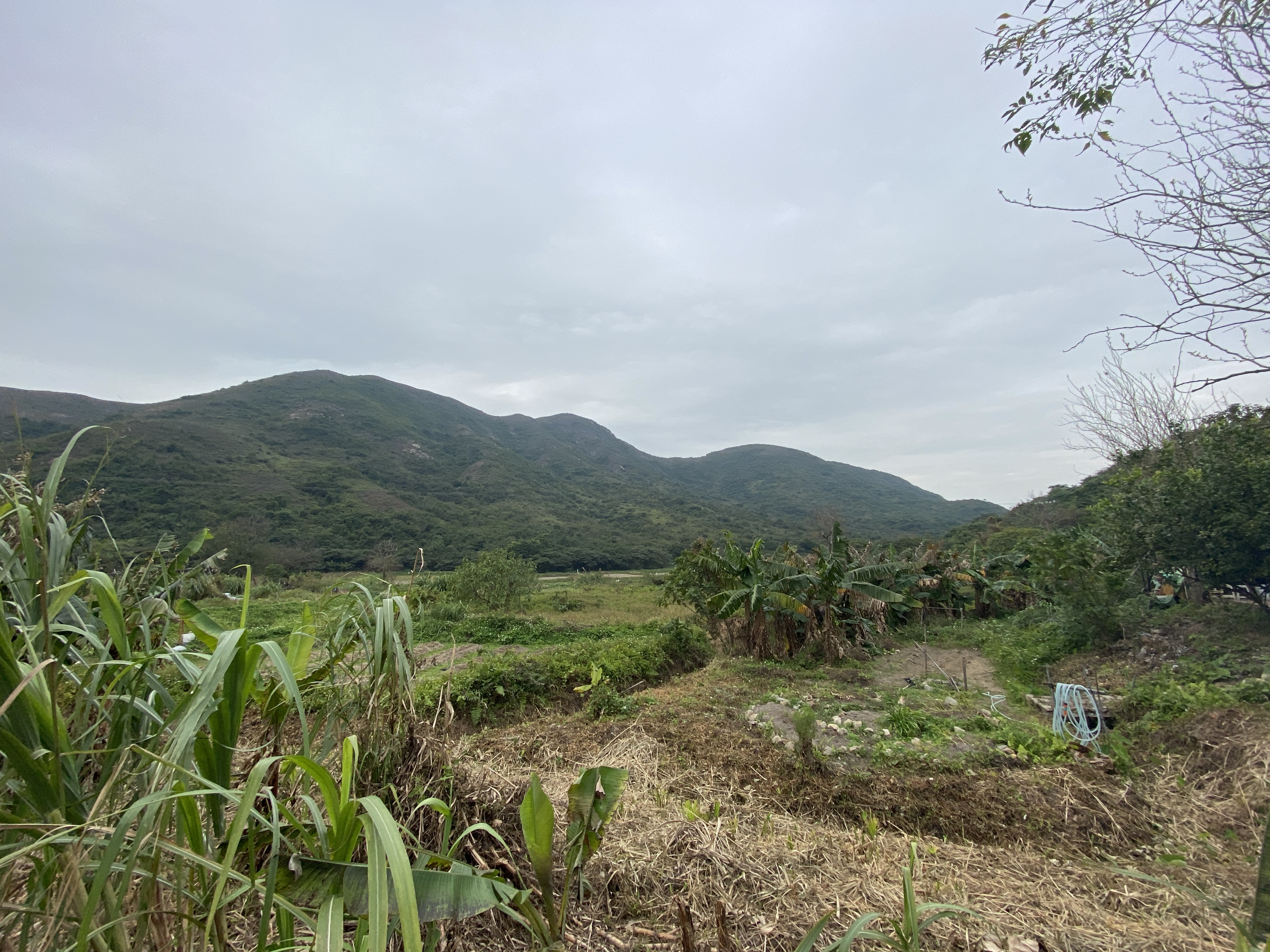
Plain near Yi O

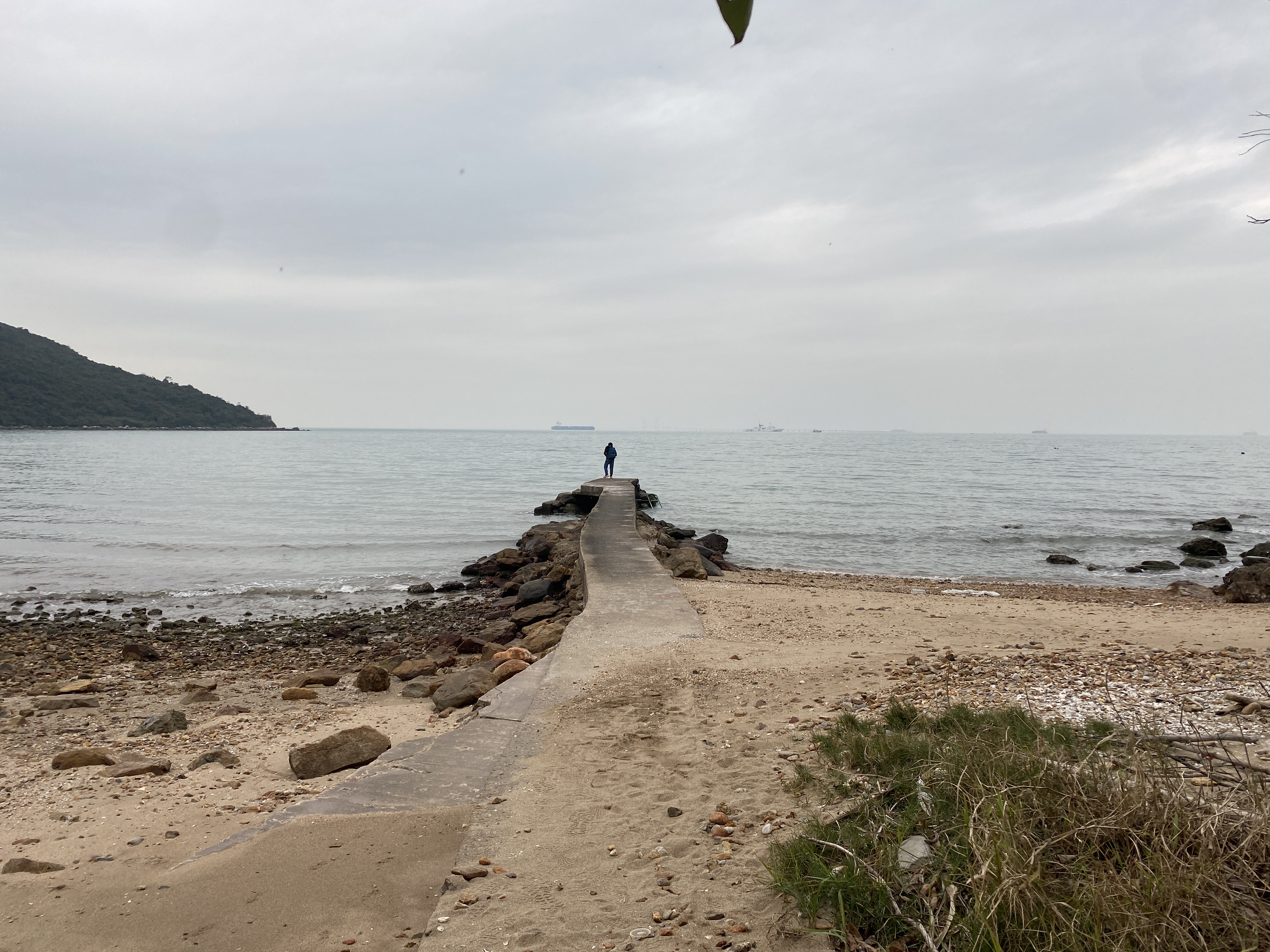
Yi O Pier

Yi O (Chinese: 二澳) is a village on Lantau Island, Hong Kong.

== Administration ==
Yi O is a recognized village under the New Territories Small House Policy.

== Geography ==
Lying in a fertile valley, it is a traditional agricultural area where the remaining villagers operate the Yi O Agricultural Cooperative, a cooperative that uses farming as a core activity to rebuild the rural community's economy. It is one of the last remaining rice production areas in Hong Kong and provides rice to some high-end and award-winning restaurants.

== Transportation ==
Yi O can be accessed by sea or by foot. There is no road access to the village. It is crossed by Section 7 of the Lantau Trail. Yi O Pier is situated on Section 7 of the Lantau Trail, you can reserve barge services to Tai O.

== See also ==
- Peaked Hill (Hong Kong)
