= Nam Pin Wai (Yuen Long) =

Walled village in the Yuen Long District, Hong Kong

Coordinates: 22.44745°N 114.03303°E

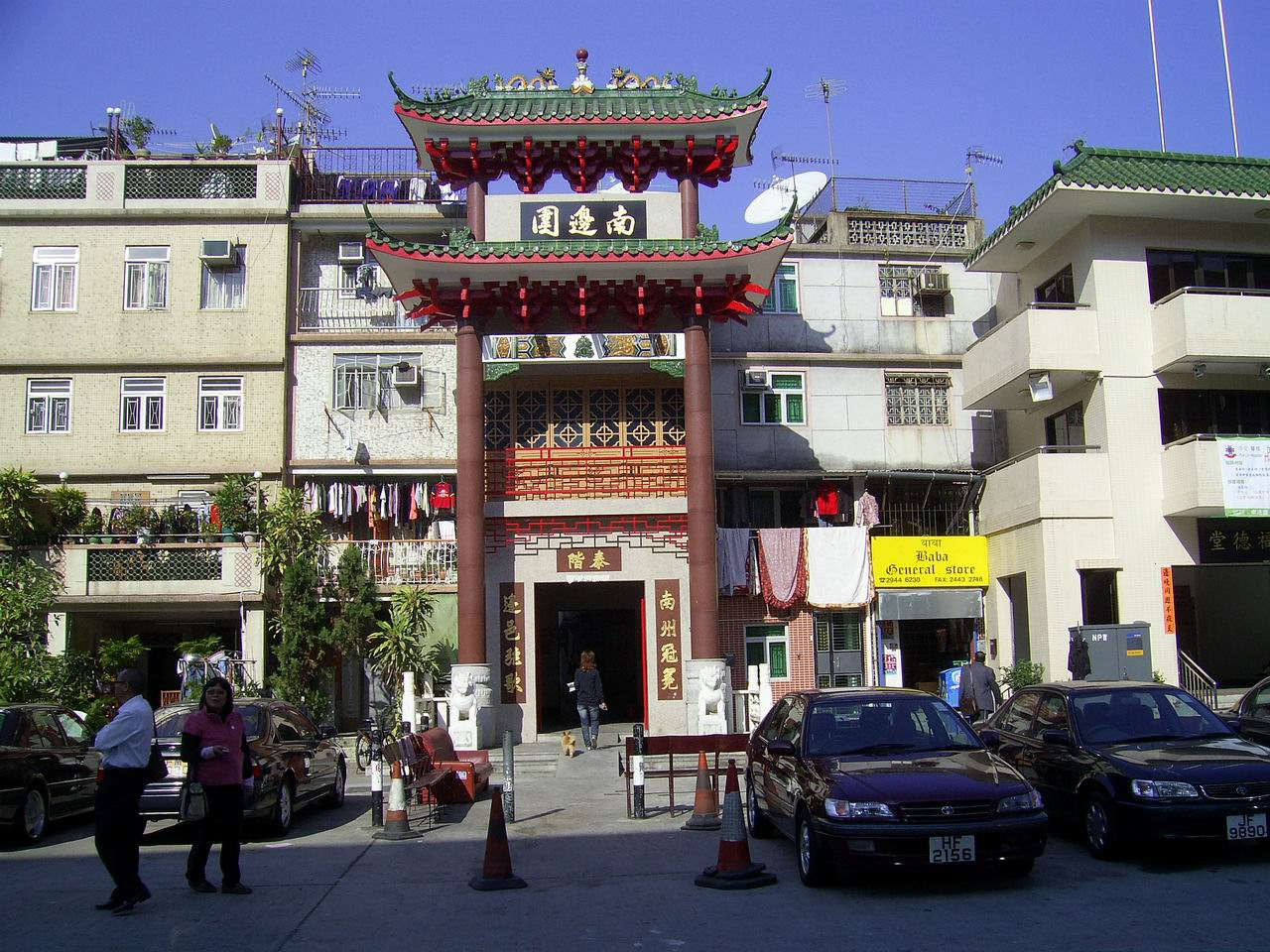
Entrance gate of Nam Pin Wai in January 2009.

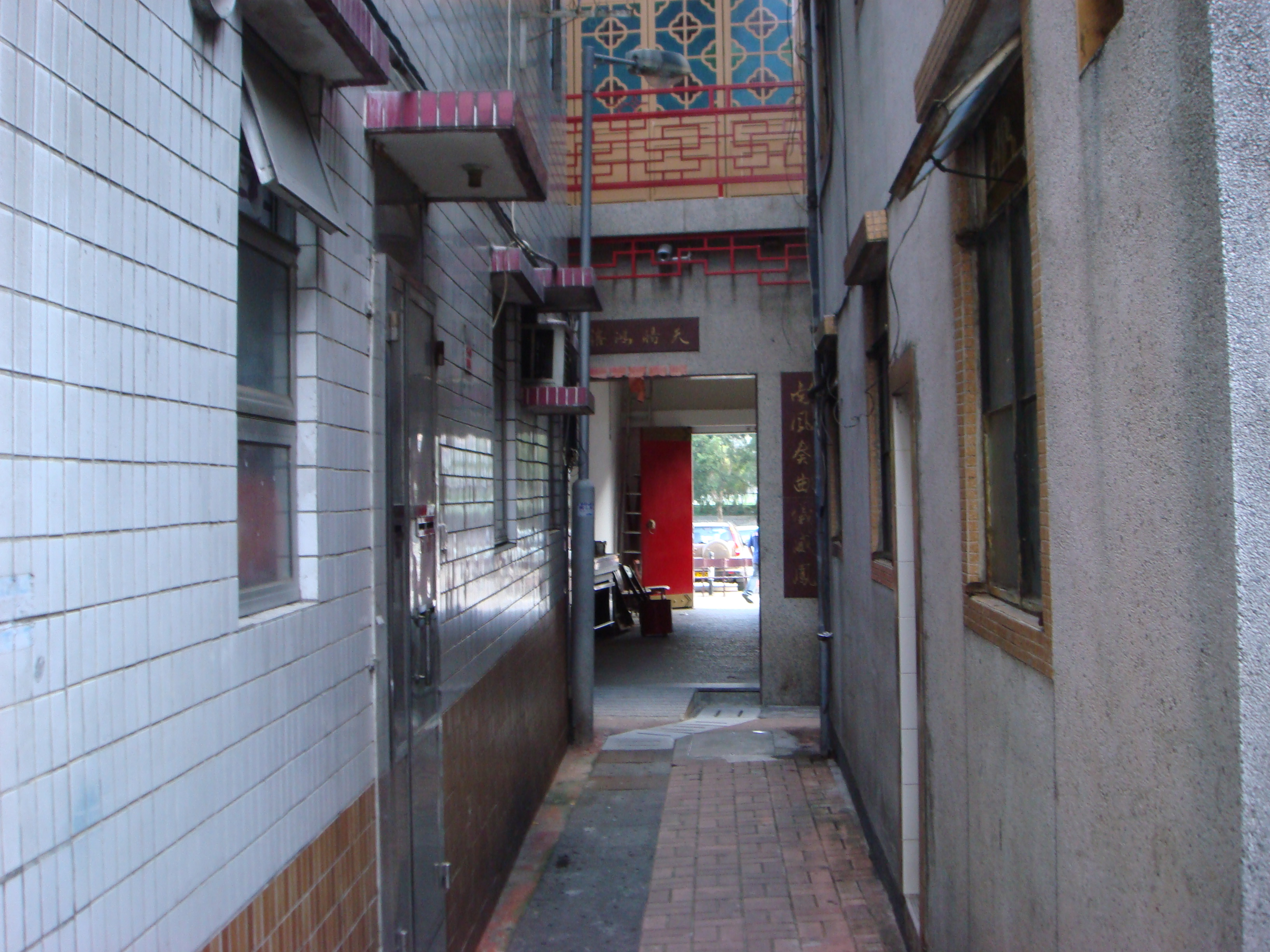
Central axis of Nam Pin Wai, looking toward the entrance gate in July 2009.

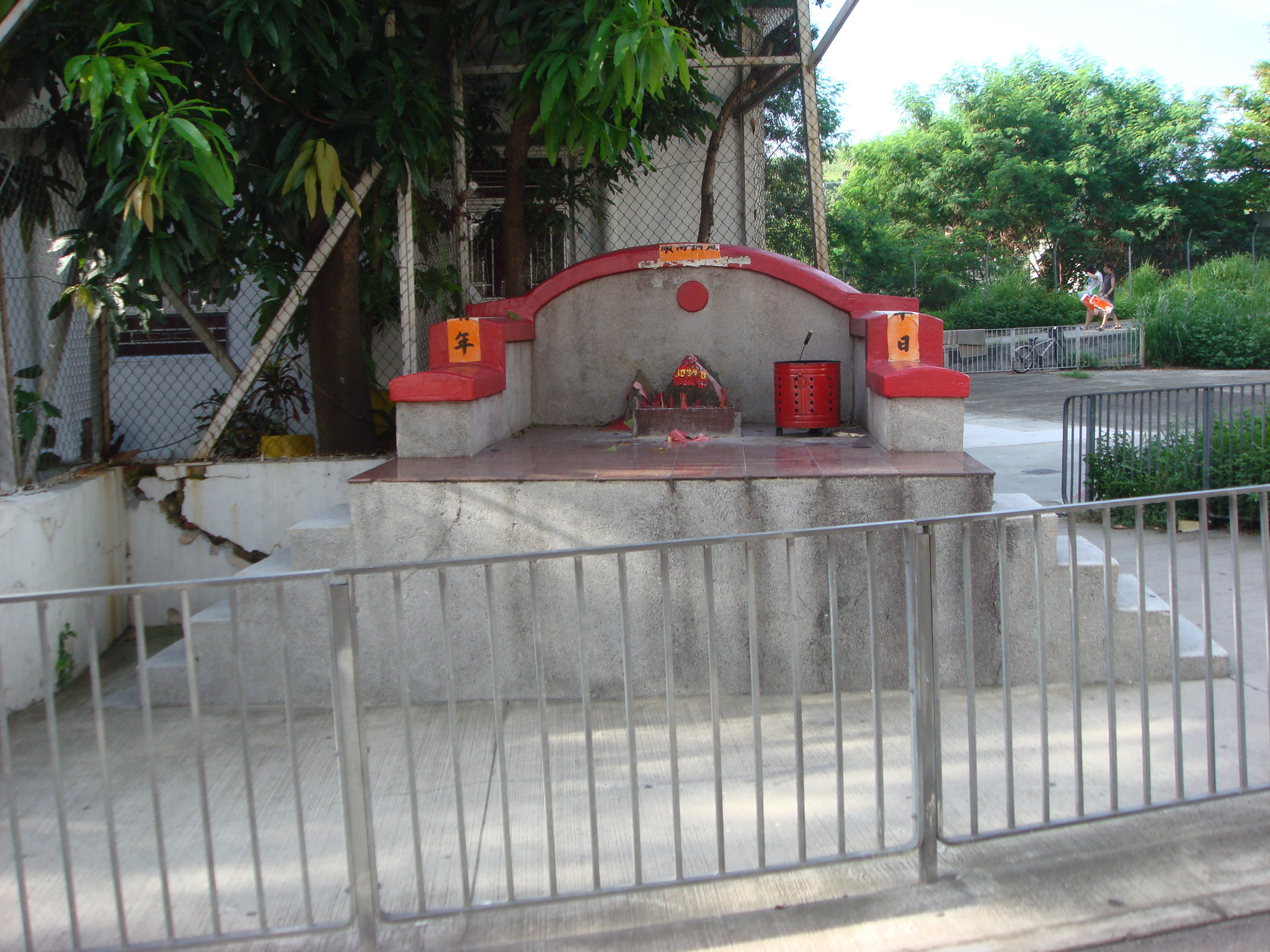
Earth God shrine at Nam Pin Wai.

Nam Pin Wai (Chinese: 南邊圍), sometimes transliterated as Nam Bin Wai, is a walled village in the Yuen Long Kau Hui area of Yuen Long District, Hong Kong.

== Administration ==
Nam Pin Wai is a recognized village under the New Territories Small House Policy.

== History ==
Nam Pin Wai and nearby Sai Pin Wai were set up by members of the Tang Clan of Kam Tin. The Tang later considered that the two villages were of bad feng shui and moved to nearby Ying Lung Wai.

At the time of the 1911 census, the population of Nam Pin Wai was 519. The number of males was 223.

Nam Pin Wai is part of the Tung Tau alliance (東頭約) or "Joint Meeting Group of Seven Villages", together with Tung Tau Tsuen, Choi Uk Tsuen, Ying Lung Wai, Shan Pui Tsuen, Wong Uk Tsuen and Tai Wai Tsuen. The Yi Shing Temple in Wong Uk Tsuen is an alliance temple of the Tung Tau Alliance.

== Features ==
The Tai Wong Temple in Cheung Shing Street is the main temple of Nam Pin Wai as well as Yuen Long Kau Hui.

== See also ==
- Walled villages of Hong Kong
- 2019 Yuen Long attack
