= Hung Shing =

Chinese folk religion deity

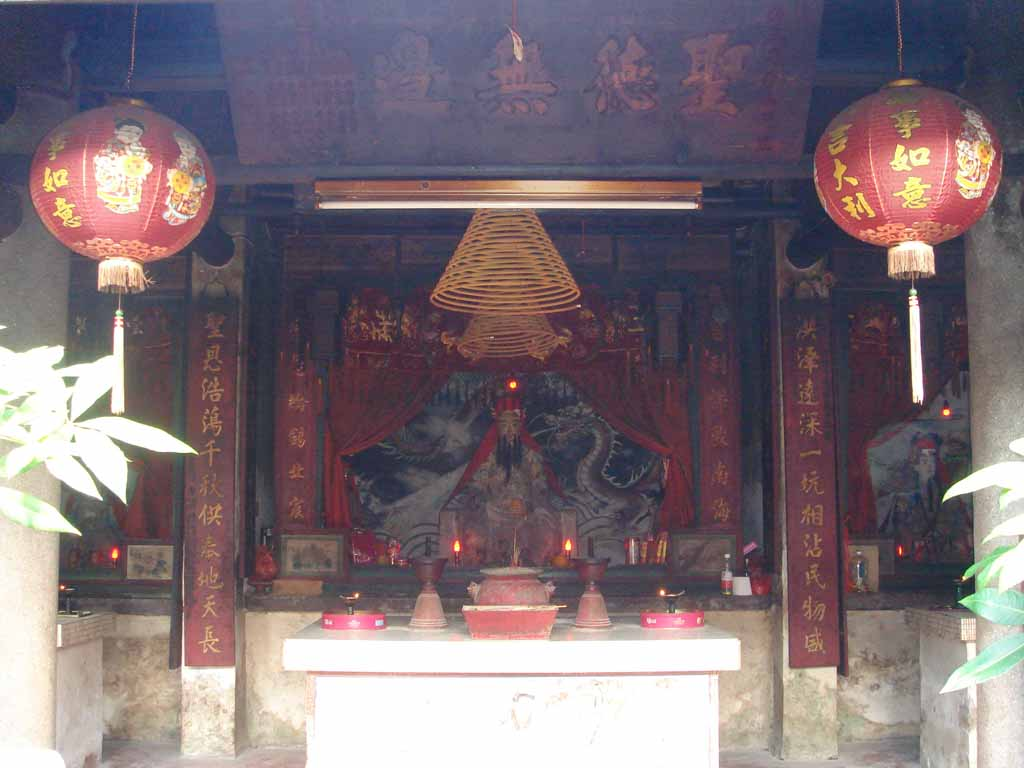
Statue and altar of Hung Shing in the Hung Shing Temple of Hang Mei Tsuen, Ping Shan, Hong Kong.

Hung Shing wong (Chinese: 洪聖), also known as Hung Shing Ye (洪聖爺) and Tai Wong (大王) is a Chinese folk religion deity. The most popular tale states that in his lifetime he was a government official in the Tang dynasty (AD 618–907) named Hung Hei (洪熙) serving Pun Yue in present-day Guangdong, China.

His festival (洪聖誕) is held on the 13th day of the 2nd month in the Chinese calendar.

== Life and memory ==
The popular tale is that Hung Hei was a righteous government official who won approbation from the people. During his tenure in office, he promoted the study and application of astronomy, geography and mathematics, and established an observatory to observe the meteorological changes, thus contributing to the well-being of people under his governance, especially fishermen and sea traders. Unfortunately, he died young.

After his death, an Emperor of the Tang dynasty disseminated his virtues to the whole country and bestowed upon him the posthumous title of Nam Hoi Kwong Li Hung Shing Tai Wong (南海廣利洪聖大王), lit. the Saint King Hung the Widely Beneficial of South Sea. It is usually shortened to Hung Shing or Tai Wong.

Legend has it that Hung Shing continued to guard the people against natural disasters on numerous occasions after his death, and showed his presence to save many people during tempests. The government as well as fishermen in the surrounding area built many temples to worship him as the God of Southern Sea. Hung Shing temples have been widely built in southern China, especially Guangdong province and in Hong Kong. In Hong Kong, they are named Hung Shing Miu (洪聖廟) or Tai Wong Miu (大王廟).

Modern scholars however believe that Hung Shing is derived from the worship of Zhurong, the fire deity and god of the southern seas. Worship of Zhurong as the god of the southern seas predates the Tang dynasty: one temple dedicated to the "South Sea God" in Guangzhou dates from the preceding Sui dynasty. The title "South Sea God" was conferred by Emperor Wen of Sui. Emperor Xuanzong of Tang conferred on the South Sea God the title "Guangli DaWang" (廣利大王), and additional titles were conferred during the Song and Yuan dynasties, resulting eventually in the full title "South Sea Guangli Hongsheng Zhaoshun Weixian Lingfu Wang" (南海廣利洪聖昭順威顯靈孚王).

== See also ==
- Hung Shing Temple for a list of temples dedicated to Hung Shing
- Tin Hau and Tin Hau temples in Hong Kong
- Tam Kung and His temples in Hong Kong & overseas
- Yiu Ming Temple, New South Wales, Australia
