= List of special schools in Hong Kong =

List of special schools in Hong Kong

== Special Needs schools ==
- Buddhist To Chi Fat She Yeung Tat Lam Memorial School
- Caritas Jockey Club Lok Yan School
- Caritas Lok Jun School
- Caritas Lok Kan School
- Caritas Lok Yi School
- Caritas Resurrection School
- CCC Kei Shun Special School
- CCC Mongkok Church Kai Oi School
- Chi Yun School
- Choi Jun School
- Chun Tok School
- Ebenezer New Hope School
- Ebenezer School
- Evan China Fellowship Holy Word School
- Haven of Hope Sunnyside School
- Heung Hoi Ching Kok Lin Association Buddhist Po Kwong School
- Hong Kong Red Cross John F. Kennedy Centre
- Hong Kong Red Cross Margaret Trench School
- Hong Kong Red Cross Princess Alexandra School
- Hong Kong Red Cross Hospital Schools
- HKSYC & IA Chan Nam Chong Memorial School
- Hong Chi Lions Morninghill School
- Hong Chi Morninghill School, Tsui Lam
- Hong Chi Morninghill School, Tuen Mun (Band 3C in secondary school, rarely 2A)
- Hong Chi Morninghope School, Tuen Mun
- Hong Chi Morningjoy School, Yuen Long
- Hong Chi Morninglight School, Tuen Mun
- Hong Chi Morninglight School, Yuen Long
- Hong Chi Pinehill School
- Hong Chi Pinehill No.2 School
- Hong Chi Pinehill No.3 School
- Hong Chi Winifred Mary Cheung Morn School
- Hong Kong Christian Service Pui Oi School
- Jockey Club Hong Chi School
- Jockey Club Sarah Roe School
- Ko Fook Iu Memorial School the Spastics Association Hong Kong
- Lutheran School For The Deaf
- Mary Rose School
- Mental Health Association of Hong Kong - Cornwall School
- Po Leung Kuk Centenary School
- Po Leung Kuk Law's Foundation School
- Po Leung Kuk Mr. and Mrs. Chan Pak Keung Tsing Yi School
- Po Leung Kuk Yu Lee Mo Fan Memorial School
- Rotary Club of Hong Kong Island West Hong Chi Morninghope School
- Rhenish Church Grace School
- Society of Anaesthetists of Hong Kong B. M. Kotewall Memorial School
- Society of Anaesthetists of Hong Kong Jockey Club Elaine Field School
- Society of Anaesthetists of Hong Kong Ko Fook Iu Memorial School
- Salvation Army Shek Wu School
- Sam Shui Natives Association Lau Pun Cheung School
- Saviour Lutheran School
- Shatin Public School
- Tseung Kwan O Pui Chi School
- Tung Wah Group of Hospitals Kwan Fong Kai Chi School
- Tung Wah Group of Hospitals Tsui Tsin Tong School

== Hospital schools ==
- Alice Ho Miu Ling Nethersole Hospital Red Cross School
- Caritas Medical Centre Red Cross School
- Duchess of Kent Hospital Red Cross School
- Kowloon Hospital Red Cross School
- Kwai Chung Hospital Red Cross School
- Kwong Wah Hospital Red Cross School
- North District Hospital Red Cross School
- Pamela Youde Nethersole Eastern Hospital Red Cross School
- Prince of Wales Hospital Red Cross School
- Princess Margaret Hospital Red Cross School
- Queen Elizabeth Hospital Red Cross School
- Queen Mary Hospital Red Cross School
- Tseung Kwan O Hospital Red Cross School
- Tuen Mun Hospital Red Cross School
- United Christian Hospital Red Cross School
- Yan Chai Hospital Red Cross School
- Yaumatei Child Psychiatric Centre Red Cross School

== Schools for Social Development ==
- Caritas Pelletier School
- Hong Kong Juvenile Care Centre Chan Nam Cheong Memorial School
- Marycove School
- Society of Boys' Centres Chak Yan Centre School
- Society of Boys' Centres Hui Chung Sing Memorial School
- Society of Boys' Centres Shing Tak Centre School
- Tung Wan Mok Law Shui Wah School

== See also ==
- List of primary schools in Hong Kong
- List of secondary schools in Hong Kong
- List of universities in Hong Kong
- List of international schools in Hong Kong
