= World Buddhist Forum =

Pan-Buddhist religious forum, held in China in 2006

The World Buddhist Forum (simplified Chinese: 世界佛教论坛; traditional Chinese: 世界佛教論壇; pinyin: Shijie Fojiao Luntan) was held in Hangzhou City and Zhoushan City, Zhejiang Province, China, from April 13 to April 16, 2006. It was the first major international religious conference in China since the founding of the People's Republic of China in 1949.

Over 1,000 monks and experts from 37 countries and regions attended the forum, giving speeches or participating in discussions under the theme of "A harmonious world begins in the mind."

Among the participants was Gyaincain Norbu, the then 16-year-old Chinese-approved 11th Panchen Lama, who was the figurehead of the forum, and made very rare public appearances. However, according to a news story by Reuters, fellow Buddhists appeared to shun him during opening ceremonies.

This forum did not include the current and exiled 14th Dalai Lama, who is viewed by China as a separatist. According to Qi Xiaofei, vice-director of the Chinese state administration for religious affairs, "The Dalai Lama is not only a religious figure, but is also a long-time stubborn secessionist who has tried to split his Chinese motherland and break the unity among different ethnic groups."

== Proposal ==
Eight disciples from the mainland, Hong Kong and Taiwan proposed the World Buddhist Forum in China in 2004, a suggestion that won support from Buddhist circles in countries like Japan and the Republic of Korea.

From October 2004 to November 2005, with the common propagation of the Buddhist communities of Hong Kong, Macao and across the Taiwan Strait, the proposal of hosting the World Buddhist Forum in Mainland China won universal support and an active response from Buddhist communities in over 40 countries. The Chinese government gave assurances it would support the Buddhist community to host the grand historic event.

=== Overseers of the First World Buddhist Forum ===
- Venerable Master Yi Cheng, President, Buddhist Association of China.
- Losang Jigmê Tubdain Qoigyi Nyima, 6th Jamyang Zhepa and abbot, Labrang Monastery; Vice President, Buddhist Association of China.
- Venerable Master Ben Huan, Director, Buddhist Association of China.
- Venerable Master Hsing Yun, Founder, Fo Guang Shan Monastery, Taiwan.
- Huba Longzhuangmeng, Abbot of Xishuangbanna Monastery.
- Venerable Master Wei Chueh, Founder, Chung Tai Shan Monastery, Taiwan.
- Venerable Master Sheng Hui, Vice President and Dean of the Chinese Buddhist Academy.
- Venerable Master Kok Kwong, President of the Hong Kong Buddhist Association.

== Purpose and guiding principle ==
The forum aimed to set up an open dialogue in equality and pluralism, for those who love the world, care for living beings, respect and protect Buddhism, with a loving heart to conduct exchanges and collaboration. The forum was open to all, Buddhists and non-Buddhists, regardless of tradition or religious background, hoping to accomplish an open dialogue on Buddhist topics.

== See also ==
- Global Buddhist Summit
- Index of Buddhism-related articles
- International Buddhist Confederation
- World Buddhist Sangha Council
- World Fellowship of Buddhists
