= Buddhism in Hong Kong =

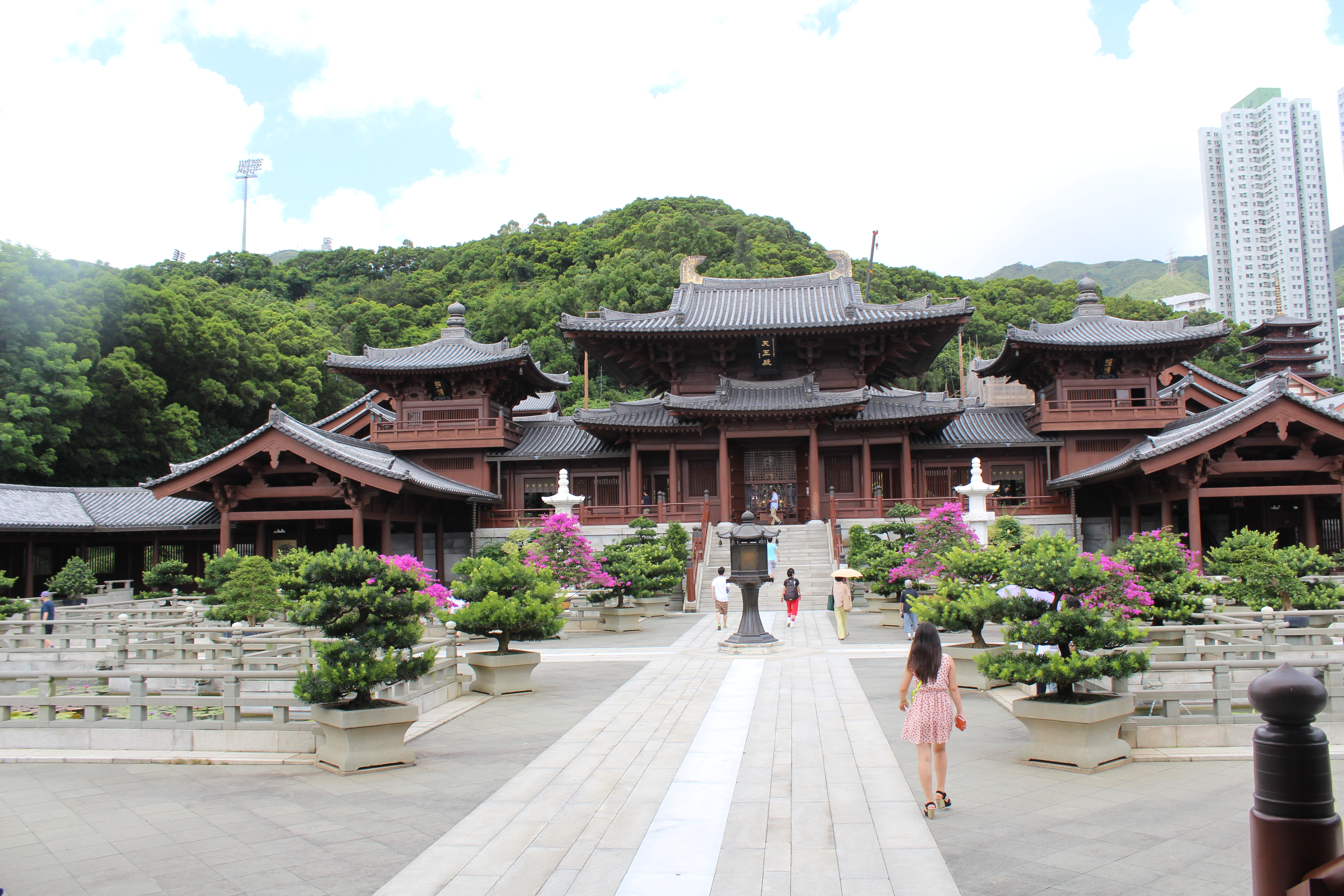
Main pavilions of the Chi Lin Nunnery.

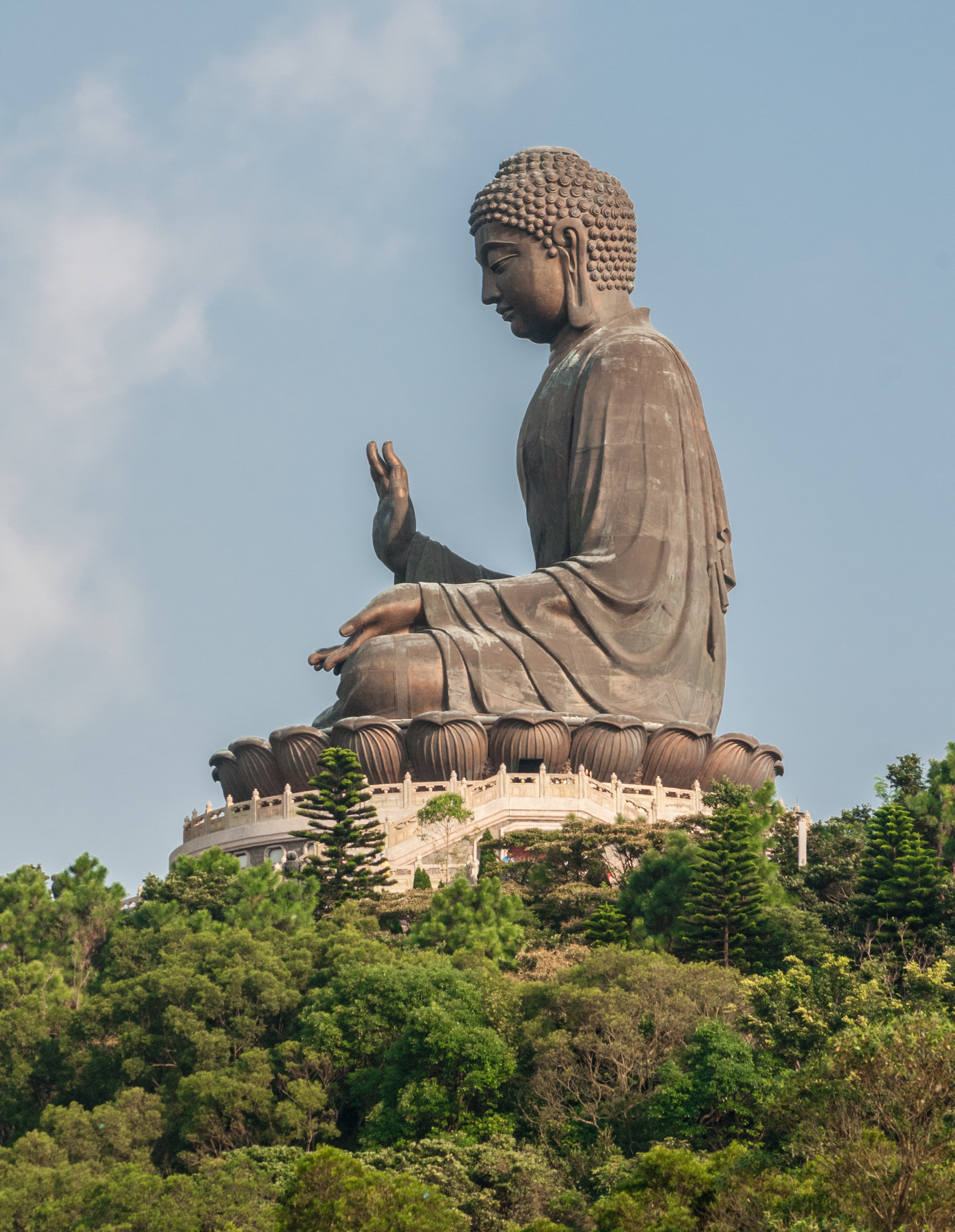
The Big Buddha, on Lantau Island.

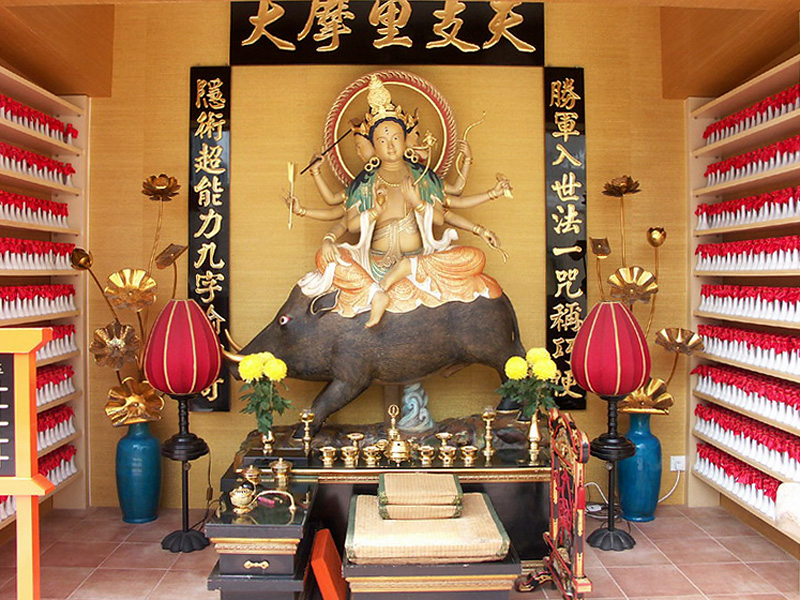
Statue of the goddess Marici, in an Esoteric Buddhist temple in Hong Kong.

Buddhism is a major religion in Hong Kong and has been greatly influential in the traditional culture of its populace. Among the most prominent Buddhist temples in the city there are the Chi Lin Nunnery in Diamond Hill, built in the Tang dynasty's architectural style; the Po Lin Monastery on Lantau Island, famous for the outdoor bronze statue, Tian Tan Buddha, which attracts a large number of visitors during the weekends and holidays.

Buddhist organizations and temples in Hong Kong have long been involved in social welfare and education. The Hong Kong Buddhist Association with close to 10,000 members operates a dozen primary and secondary schools, and elderly homes as well as centres for youth and children in Hong Kong. It also runs the Hong Kong Buddhist Hospital, which was founded in 1971.

Under the leadership of the former Chief Executive Tung Chee Hwa, the Hong Kong government formally recognised the influence of Buddhism in Hong Kong. In 1997 the government designated Buddha's Birthday as a public holiday, which replaced the Queen's birthday holiday. Tung himself is a Buddhist and participated in major, widely publicised Buddhist activities in Hong Kong and China.

Academic studies and research of Buddhism in Hong Kong have thrived over the past decades. The University of Hong Kong established a Centre of Buddhist Studies (CBS) in 2000. The Chinese University of Hong Kong also has a Centre for the Study of Humanistic Buddhism. The Buddha-Dharma Centre of Hong Kong (BDCHK) was established in April 2012 by Ven. Prof. K. L. Dhammmajoti and his post-graduate students from CBS, with primary aims to promote the study and research of Buddhism through academic courses and publications, and to integrate Buddhist study and spiritual praxis.

== Buddhist Denominations in Hong Kong ==
Most denominations of Buddhism can be found in Hong Kong, including schools from the Theravada, Mahayana and Vajrayana traditions, as well as from many geographical origins.

=== Theravada Buddhist Traditions ===
Although Theravada Buddhism remains a minority tradition mainly practiced by immigrants from Theravada Buddhist countries, there have been interest from a growing number of local Hongkongers. There are a handful meditation groups that based on Vipassana Meditation, and some Buddhist centres catered to Burmese and Sri Lankan Buddhist communities in Hong Kong. Ven. Prof. K. L. Dhammmajoti who had retired from HKU in 2014, established the Aloka Vihara where he conducts weekly Pali devotional chants for lay followers.

==== Thai Buddhist community ====
The majority of Thais in Hong Kong are adherents of Theravada Buddhism. In Hong Kong, there are four Thai Buddhist temples altogether and they are located in Ngau Tam Mei of Yuen Long, Shun Shan San Tsuen of Shap Pat Heung, Ha Pak Nai of Tuen Mun and Tai Po Tai Wo.

=== Tibetan Buddhist traditions ===
Buddhist organisations in Hong Kong from the Tibetan tradition include Diamond Way Buddhism, a network of lay Buddhist centres in the Karma Kagyu tradition, founded by Lama Ole Nydahl and under the spiritual authority of the 17th Karmapa Trinley Thaye Dorje.

=== Japanese Buddhist Sect ===
The Soka Gakkai International has an estimated 50,000 members in Hong Kong. The local association is called Soka Gakkai International of Hong Kong (HKSGI) and it promotes peace, culture and education based on the principles of Nichiren Buddhism.

== See also ==
- Buddhism in China
- Buddha's Birthday
- Ven. Sik Kok Kwong
- Hong Kong Buddhist Association
- Buddhist Fat Ho Memorial College
- Buddhist Tai Hung College
- Buddhist Wong Fung Ling College
- Buddhist Yip Kei Nam Memorial College
- Buddhist Chung Wah Kornhill Primary School
- Hong Kong Nang Yan College of Higher Education
- Hong Kong Buddhist Hospital
- Tung Lin Kok Yuen
- Thais in Hong Kong
- Religion in Hong Kong
