= Buddhist Society of India =

Buddhist organization in India, founded by B. R. Ambedkar

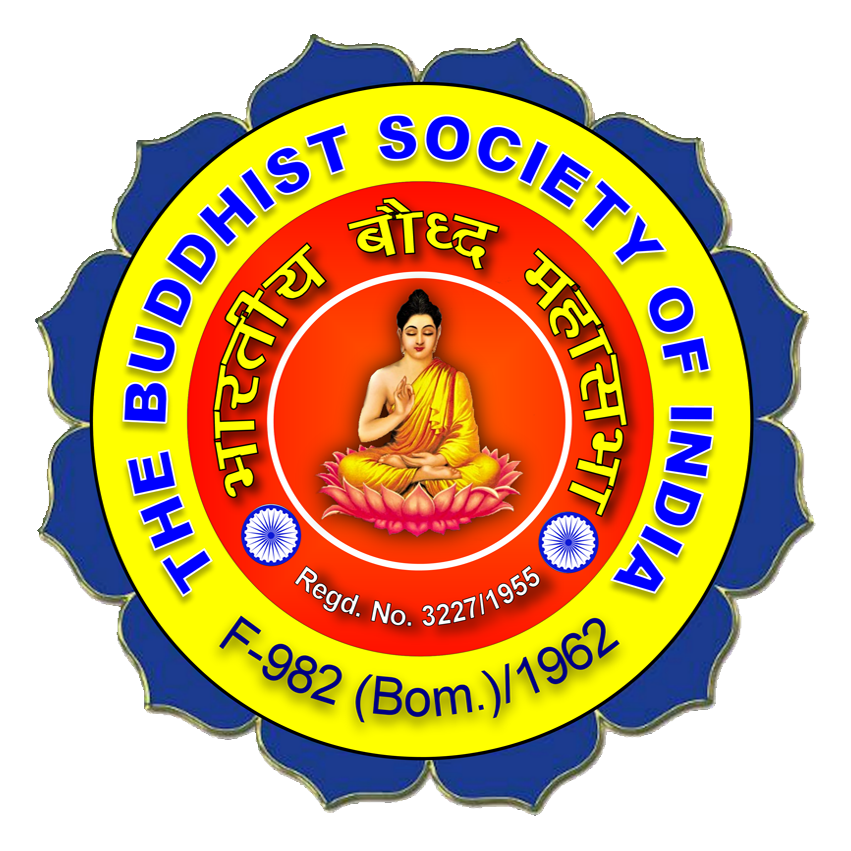
- Formation: 4 May 1955 (71 years ago)
- Founder: B. R. Ambedkar
- Legal status: Active
- Purpose: Spread of Buddhism
- Headquarters: Dadar East, 17/A, Gautam Nagar at Mumbai, in Maharashtra, India
- Region served: India
- Official language: Marathi, Hindi, English
- President: Meera Yashvant Ambedkar
- Main organ: Buddhist Society of India
- Affiliations: World Fellowship of Buddhists
- Website: https://www.tbsoi.org.in/

The Buddhist Society of India, known as the Bharatiya Bauddha Mahasabha, is a national Buddhist organization in the Republic of India. It was founded by B. R. Ambedkar on 4 May 1955 in Mumbai, Maharashtra, India. Ambedkar was the drafting chairman of the Indian Constitution, polymath, human rights activist and Buddhism revivalist in India. He was first national President of the organization. At a ceremony held on 8 May 1955 in Nare Park, Bombay (now Mumbai), Ambedkar formally announced the establishment of this organization for the spread of Buddhism in India. Its headquarter is in Mumbai. Currently Meera Yashvant Ambedkar, the Daughter-In-Law of B. R. Ambedkar, is the National President of the Buddhist Society of India.

== History ==
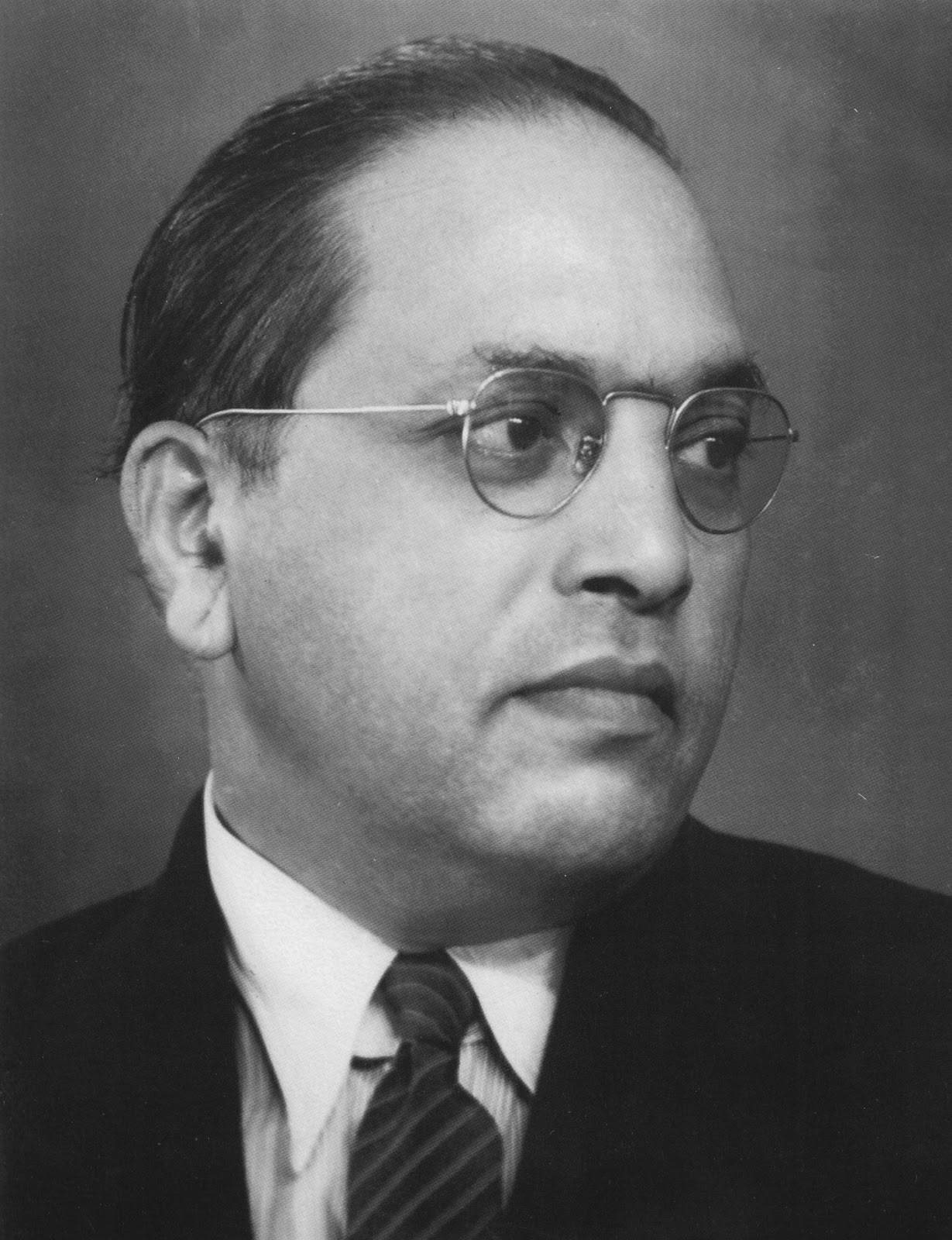
B. R. Ambedkar.

B. R. Ambedkar studied Buddhism all his life. Around 1950, he devoted his attention to Buddhism and travelled to Ceylon (now Sri Lanka) to attend a meeting of the World Fellowship of Buddhists. While dedicating a new Buddhist vihara near Pune, Ambedkar announced he was writing a book on Buddhism, and that when it was finished, he would formally convert to Buddhism. He twice visited Burma (now Myanmar) in 1954; the second time to attend the third conference of the World Fellowship of Buddhists in Rangoon. In July 1951 he formed the "Bharatiya Bauddha Janasangh" (Indian Buddhist People's Organisation), which became the "Bharatiya Bauddha Mahasabha" or the "Buddhist Society of India" in May 1955.

== See also ==
- World Buddhist Sangha Council
- International Buddhist Confederation
