= Tung Chung New Town =

Place in Hong Kong

Coordinates: 22.2927°N 113.9566°E

Tung Chung New Town 東涌新市鎮
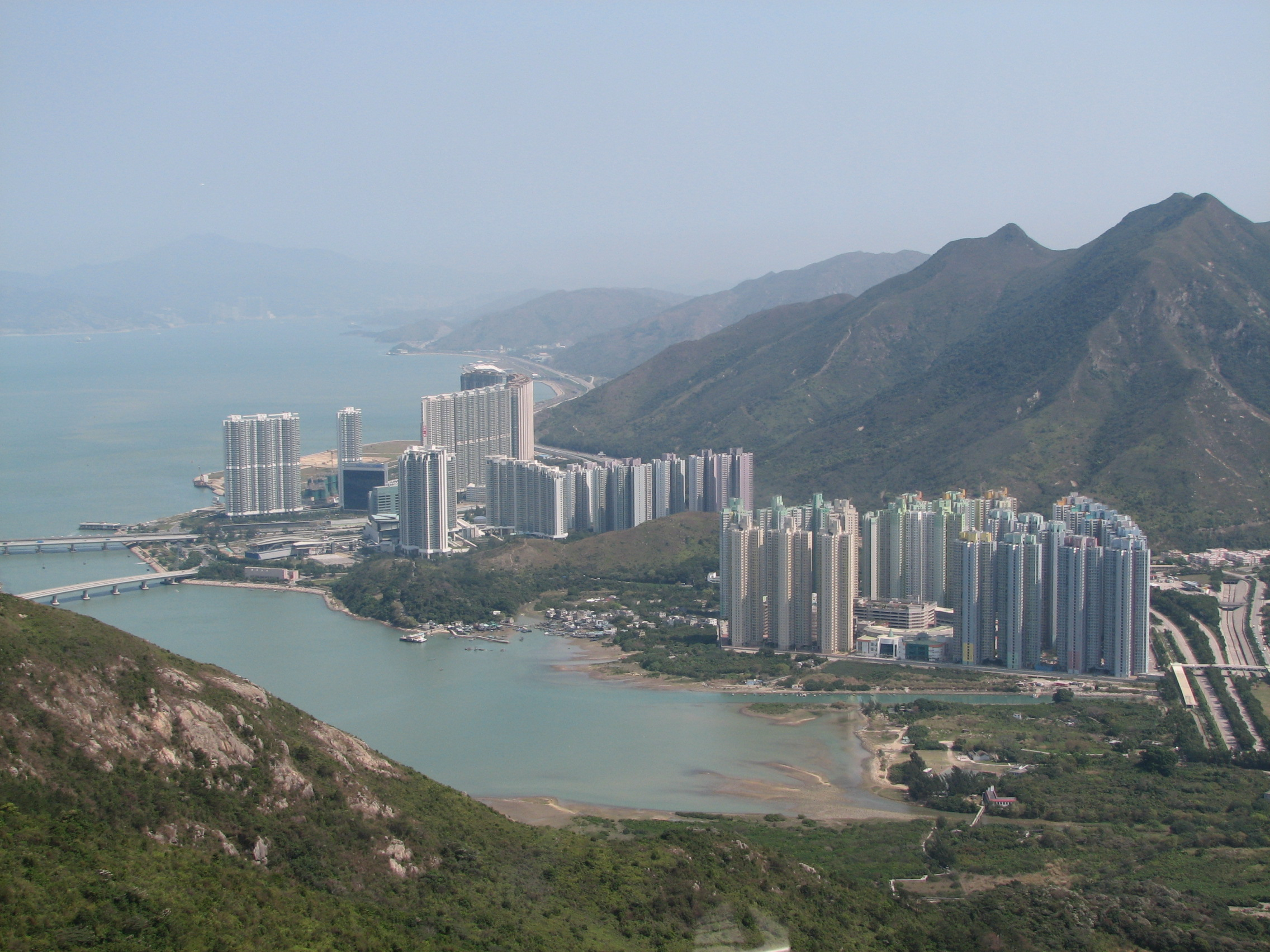
- Nickname: Tung Chung
- Interactive map of Tung Chung New Town
- Region: Hong Kong
- District: Islands District

Area
  - City: 25 km^{2} (9.7 sq mi)

Population (2018)
  - City: 130,000
  - Density: 9,639/km^{2} (24,960/sq mi)
  - Urban: 78,000
- Website: www.districtcouncils.gov.hk/island/tc

Tung Chung New Town
- Traditional Chinese: 北大嶼山新市鎮
- Simplified Chinese: 北大屿山新市镇
Transcriptions
Standard Mandarin
- Hanyu Pinyin: Běi Dàyǔshān Xīnshìzhèn
Yue: Cantonese
- Yale Romanization: Bāk daaih yùh sāan sān síh jan
- Jyutping: Bak1 daai6 jyu4 saan1 san1 si5 zan3

Tung Chung New Town, formerly named North Lantau New Town, is the newest of the nine new towns in Hong Kong, a special administrative region of China, located on the northern coast of the Lantau Island in the New Territories. It covers Tung Chung, Tai Ho Wan, Siu Ho Wan, other parts of northeast Lantau Island, and the reclaimed land along the coast between them. It is the only new town in the Islands District and the youngest new town in Hong Kong. As the commercial, residential and community facilities in the New Town are concentrated in Tung Chung, it has been renamed Tung Chung New Town in recent official government documents.

The development of North Lantau was first proposed in the late 1970s when the government proposed to build a new airport at Chek Lap Kok. In the North Lantau Development Investigation Study published in 1983, the idea of building a new town of nearly 300,000 people in Tung Chung and Tai Ho along the coast of North Lantau was proposed.

== Future development ==
According to the current planning, Tung Chung New Town will have a total area of 830 hectares and the population is planned to reach 280,000 by 2030 when the development is fully completed.

=== As a tourism consumption area ===
On 20 April 2012, the former deputy director of the Chief Executive-elect's Competition and Election Office, Mr. Ho Wing-him, stated that Leung Chun-ying planned to transform Tung Chung and Tin Shui Wai after taking office, and would then plan to build hotels and shopping malls and other consumer venues in Tung Chung, mainly to attract visitors to Hong Kong. As Tung Chung has a population of only 100,000, there is still plenty of room for development, and the proximity to the Hong Kong International Airport and AsiaWorld-Expo has a large number of tourists passing through.

In the Tung Chung New Town expansion plan, the proposed Tung Chung East Railway Station will become a regional business center. With the commercial development above the Hong Kong–Zhuhai–Macau Bridge and the Hong Kong SkyCity, more tourists will be attracted to Hong Kong and the huge economic potential of North Lantau would be released.

=== Tung Chung New Town Expansion Plan ===
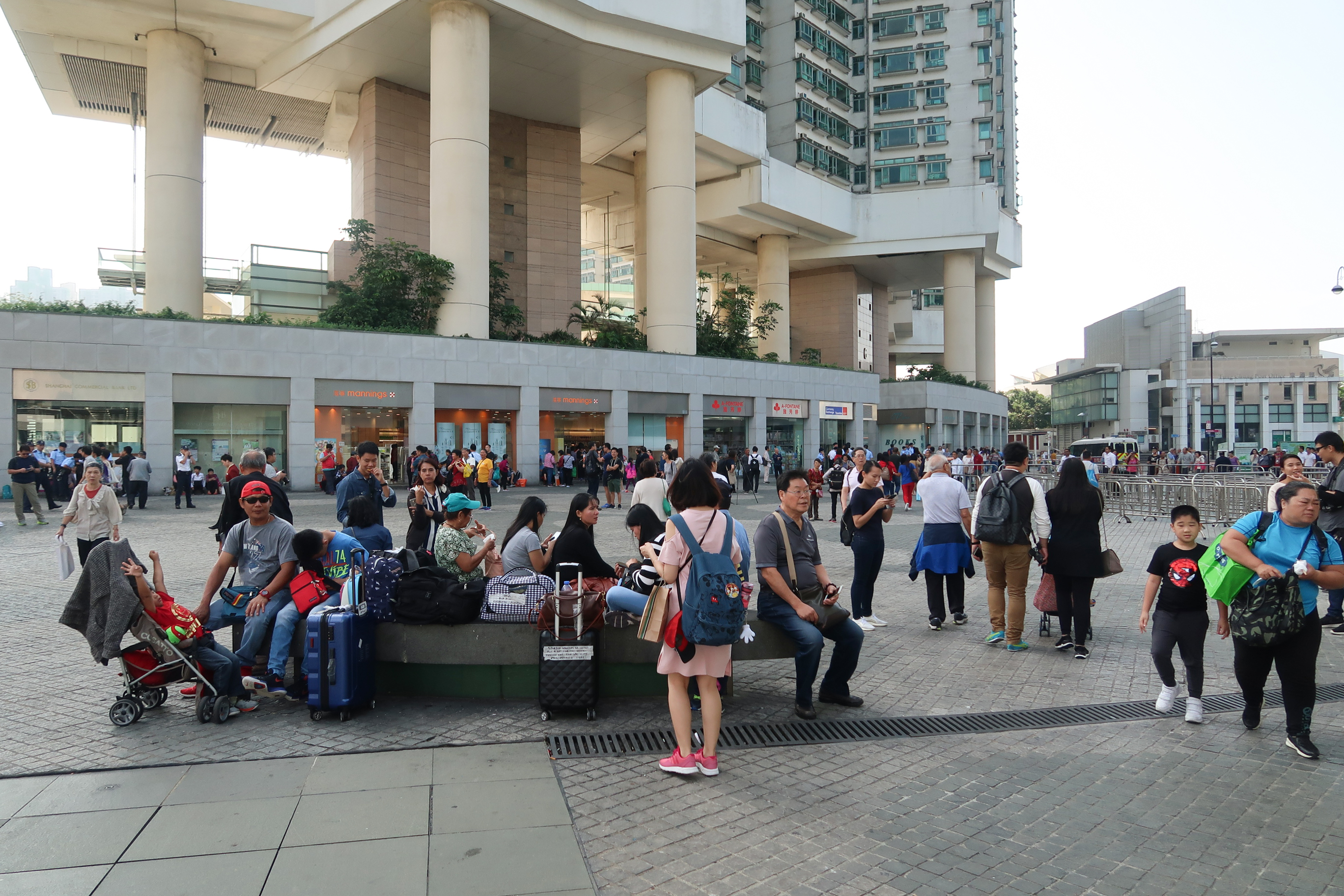
Hong Kong–Zhuhai–Macau Bridge, which opened in October 2018, has led to a surge in tourists visiting Tung Chung for shopping during weekends. This has caused residents in the area to express concerns about the impact it has on their daily lives.

With a current population of 105,000, the study conducted by the Planning Department and the Civil Engineering and Development Department identified Tung Chung as a potential new town of 220,000 people. The Tung Chung New Town Expansion Plan would examine the development potential and opportunities of Tung Chung, identify the scale of expansion of Tung Chung New Town and improve community and regional facilities.

A three-stage public engagement exercise was launched by the Planning Department and the Civil Engineering and Development Department, with the first stage ending on 12 August of the same year, and the views collected will be used to formulate a preliminary outline development plan.

On 17 February 2017, the Chief Executive in Council approved the draft outline zoning plans for Tung Chung East and Tung Chung West.

On 5 February 2018, the Tung Chung New Town Extension Project was launched, in which 130 hectares of land will be reclaimed and the first phase of reclamation is expected to be completed in 2020. The first phase of reclamation is expected to be completed by 2020. Upon completion, it will be able to accommodate an additional 140,000 people. This is the first reclaimed land for a new town expansion project after the Tseung Kwan O South reclamation in 2003 and the completion of the final phase of reclamation in Tung Chung in the same year.

=== Siu Ho Wan reclamation ===
In his 2016 policy address, then Chief Executive Leung Chun-ying said he would study the 30-hectare Siu Ho Wan depot above the MTR for residential development. The MTRCL commissioned a consultancy study, and the preliminary development proposal released in July 2017 indicated that up to 108 residential blocks could be built above the depot, providing 14,000 dwellings and a 320,000-square-foot shopping mall. The environmental assessment report for this development was approved with conditions on 29 November 2017, and the statutory planning process of the Town Planning Board is expected to commence in the first quarter of 2018.

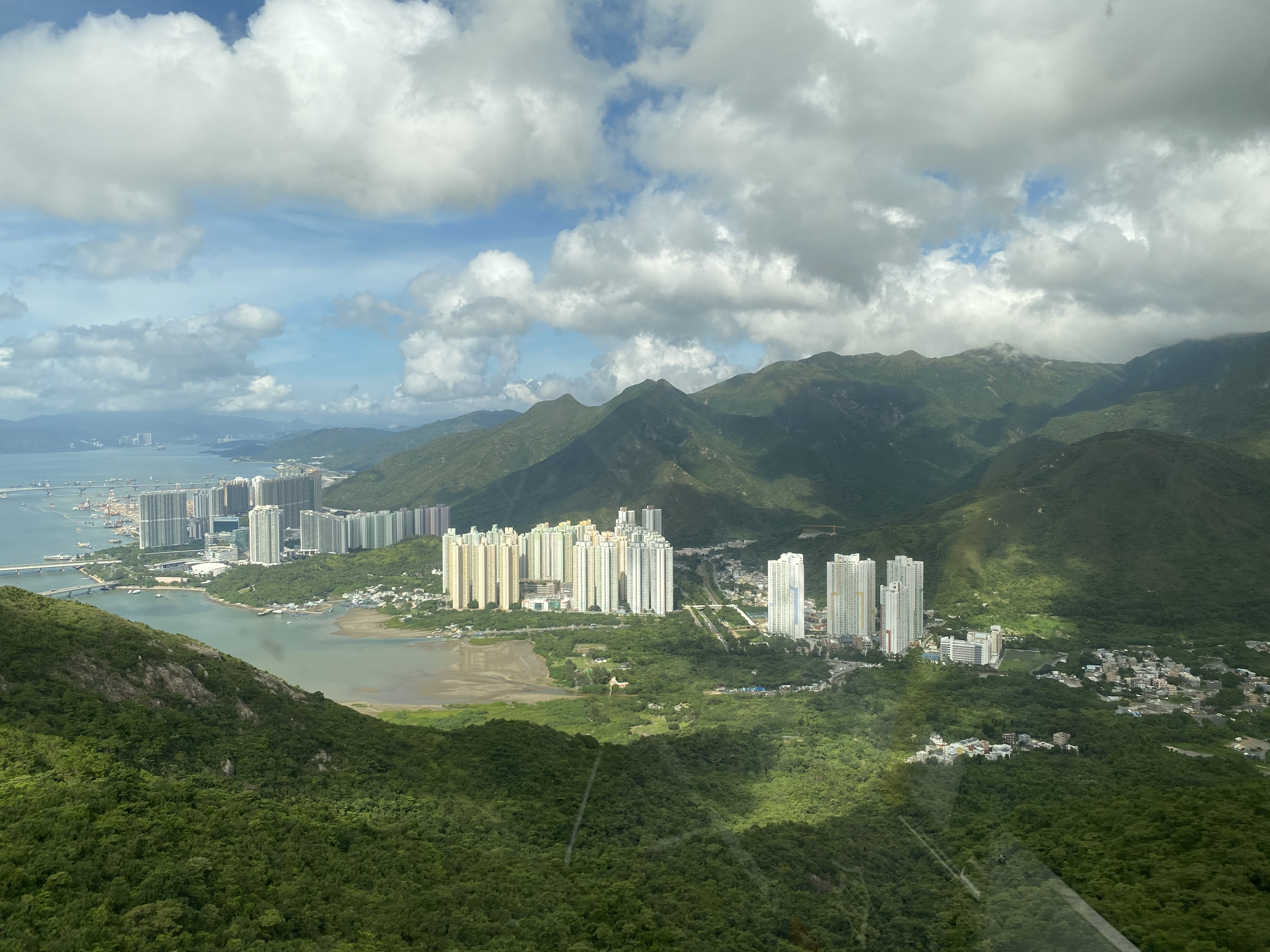
Residential complexes on the west bank of Tung Chung, arranged in an arc along the North Lantau Highway (photographed in 2007)

Meanwhile, Siu Ho Wan was listed as one of the five proposed near-shore reclamation sites during the 2013 Stage 2 Public Engagement for Land Supply Enhancement. The government-commissioned consultant released a preliminary development proposal in early January 2018, proposing to shape the reclaimed land into a high quality of life and knowledge district with low-density residential and educational facilities.

By 2019, according to the MTR property director, Tang Chi-fai, private and subsidized housing will be provided above the Siu Ho Wan depot, with a total of 14,000 units. It will also provide community facilities such as a shopping mall, school and kindergarten with an area of about 300,000 square feet. The project requires the relocation of the existing depot and the construction of a brand new Siu Ho Wan station, which is considered to be very difficult to develop and requires further discussion with the government on the details, which is expected to take 10 years to develop.

=== Public market ===
Tung Chung residents have been fighting for public markets for years. There are four markets in the district, of which three, namely Fu Tung, Yat Tung and Mun Tung, are outsourced by Link Management, while the remaining one is outsourced by the Housing Department. In order to save money, many people in the district will let their elderly buy groceries from public markets in Tsing Yi or Tsuen Wan. However, there are yet still difficulties in building more public markets in Tung Chung.

== Community issues ==
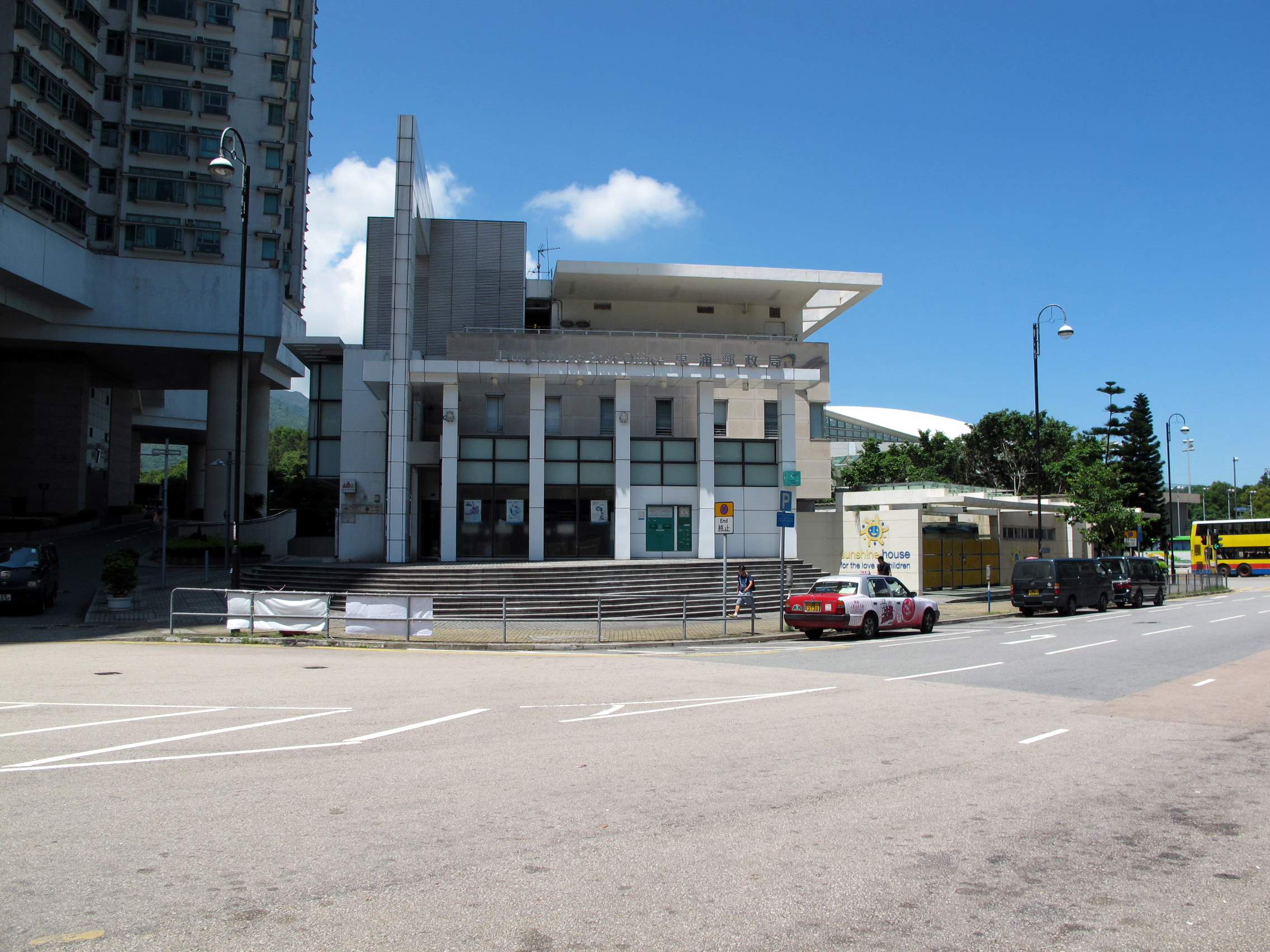
Tung Chung Post Office

The original plan underestimated the population growth of Tung Chung and relied too much on the population ratios of the Hong Kong Planning Standards and Guidelines (HKPSG), resulting in a serious shortage of public community facilities in the Tung Chung New Town. In his 2006-2007 Policy address, former Chief Executive Donald Tsang pledged to build a library, sports centre, swimming pool and other leisure facilities in Tung Chung, and to enhance the planning and coordination of community support facilities. These facilities were completed between 2009 and 2011. However, most of the community facilities are concentrated in Tung Chung Town Center and Tung Chung North, which are mainly private residential areas, and are still inconvenient to residents of Yat Tung Estate, which is located in the western part of Tung Chung.

Although the North Lantau Hospital was approved for construction in 2009 and opened in September 2013, many facilities have not yet been opened, resulting in a waste of resources and the need for some residents to continue to travel long distances to seek treatment at Princess Margaret Hospital.

Tung Chung does not have any public markets planned, only markets attached to public housing estates, and with the lack of competition and under the management of Link REIT, Tung Chung tends to have one of the highest prices in Hong Kong. In May 2016, the Yat Tung Market, which was contracted out by Link to the Kin Wah Group, was under renovation. Many residents could not bear the years of monopoly and were worried that prices would be further pushed up, so in 2016, residents went out of their way to organize a market with Eddie Chu, and at one point clashed with Link's security and outsourced contractors. The then Chief Executive Leung Chun-ying stated in his 2017 policy address that he would study the possibility of allocating land for a public market in the Tung Chung Development Area, but concern groups argued that the market would take more than 10 years to complete, making it difficult to meet the immediate needs of residents.

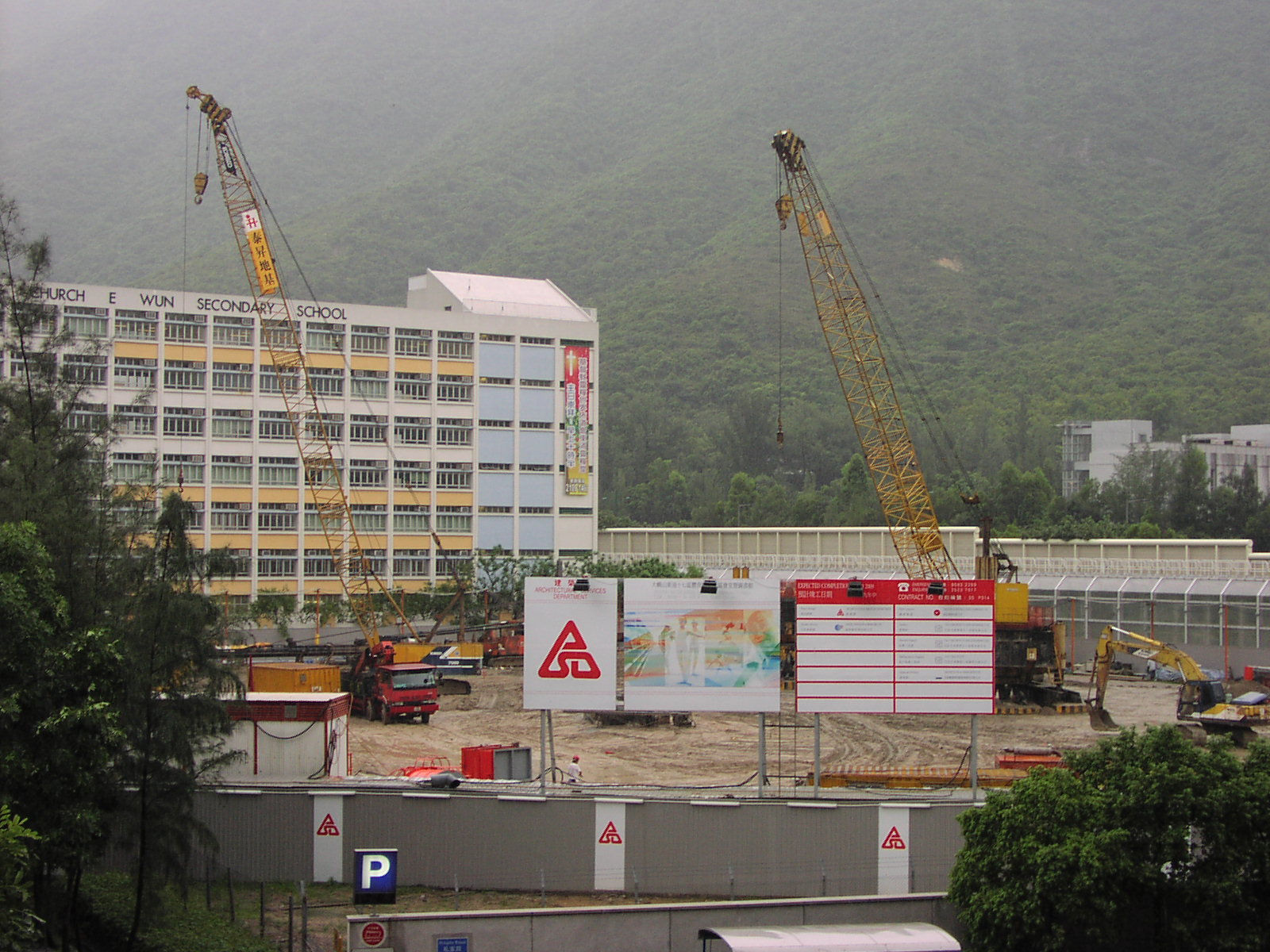
The Tung Chung Municipal Building under construction, located in Tung Chung District 17

According to the 2011 census, Tung Chung had a population of 115,000, but only 6,000 residents were able to work in the Lantau area. Although there are many job opportunities in the surrounding areas of Tung Chung, such as the airport and Hong Kong Disneyland, the low employment rate in the area is mainly due to the fact that the types and nature of jobs do not match the needs of the residents. Some groups have advocated for Tung Chung to develop a "bridgehead economy", and to take advantage of the economic opportunities of the Hong Kong-Zhuhai-Macau Bridge. However, the employment opportunities created by the bridgehead economy are still mainly in the retail, catering, and tourism hospitality industries, which have limited effect on improving the employment situation in Tung Chung.

The pollution problem in Tung Chung has become increasingly serious since 2010; in the first five months of 2017 alone, Tung Chung recorded 26 hours of Very High or Severe Health Risk Levels of 10 or 10+ in the Air Quality Health Index, and 42 days in 2016 when Tung Chung was in the top three in terms of health risk. With the opening of the HZMB in the second half of 2018 and the construction of a third runway, as well as the rapid urbanization in Tung Chung, many people expect the air quality in Tung Chung to deteriorate further.

After the opening of the Hong Kong-Zhuhai-Macau Bridge in October 2018, a large number of tourists came to Tung Chung every Sunday for shopping. Residents in the area complained about the excessive number of tourists and the noise that affected their lives, and demanded that bus stops be moved away from residential areas. The shopping mall is crowded, the cafes and fast food restaurants are full, and the hygiene of the toilets has become bad. Residents said that some goods had been snapped up by tourists, affecting people's livelihood, and that Tung Chung had "fallen". On 11 November 2018, a campaign was launched called "Reclaim Tung Chung" to reduce the impact of excessive tourists on people's livelihood.
