= KWC =

KWC may refer to:

- Karaoke World Championships, a song contest and talent show
- Kentucky Wesleyan College, a private Methodist college in Owensboro, Kentucky
- Kings World Cup, a branding used for two seven-a-side football tournaments organized by Kings League:
  - Kings World Cup Clubs, a tournament for teams from various leagues in Kings League; originally just called Kings World Cup
  - Kings World Cup Nations, a tournament for representative national teams using the Kings League format
- King William's College, a school in Castletown, Isle of Man
- Kowloon Walled City, a former enclave of Hong Kong
- Kowloon West Cluster, hospital cluster under the Hospital Authority in Hong Kong
- Kyocera Wireless Corporation, a manufacturer of mobile phones
- Tri-Cities (Ontario), a tri-city area in Ontario, Canada that encompasses Kitchener, Waterloo and Cambridge
