= Buddhist Sin Tak College =

Secondary school in Kwai Chung, Hong Kong

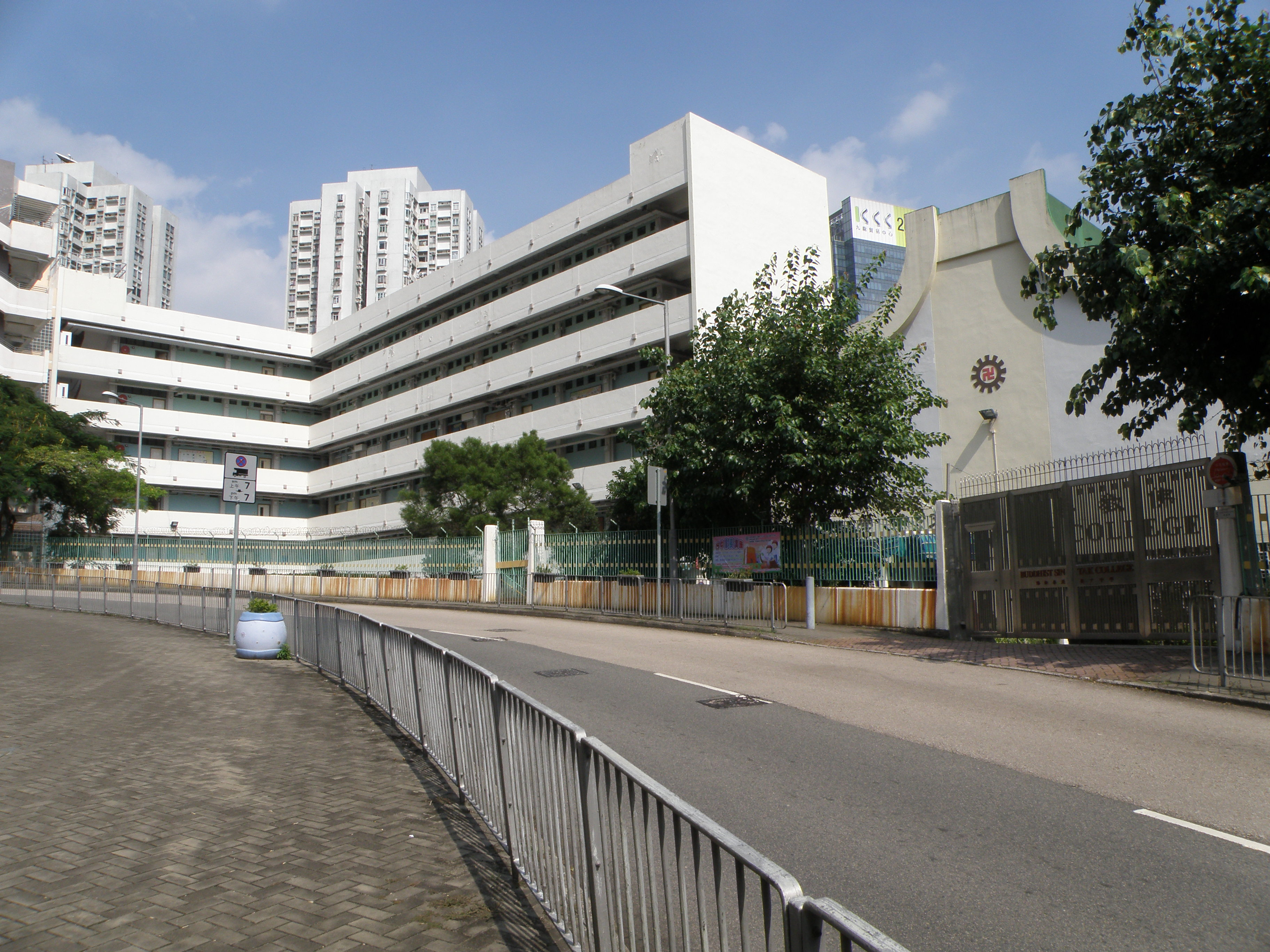
- School building pictured in 2014

Location
- 5 Hing Shing Road; Kwai Chung, New Territories; Hong Kong
- Coordinates: 22.3626°N 114.1299°E

Information
- Established: 1 September 1973
- Supervisor: Ven. Ku Tay
- Principal: Chan Sai Wing
- Language: English
- Affiliation: Hong Kong Buddhist Association
- Website: bstc.edu.hk

Buddhist Sin Tak College (Chinese: 佛教善德英文中學) is a secondary school in Kwai Chung, New Territories, Hong Kong. It uses the English and Chinese languages as the medium of instruction.

== History ==
The school was established by the Hong Kong Buddhist Association (HKBA), which applied to the Hong Kong government in June 1969 for a piece of land in Tsuen Wan upon which to build a school. The proposal was accepted in July 1969 by the former Education Department. Chairman of the Hang Seng Bank, Ho Sin Hang, and his wife Madam Ho provided a donation toward the construction of the school. The school's name therefore incorporates characters from the Chinese names of the two donors ("sin", meaning kindness, and "tak", meaning virtue).

A foundation stone for the new school was laid in February 1973 by HKBA president Kok Kwong, Ho Sin Hang, Madam Ho, and New Territories district commissioner Denis Bray.

Classes began in September 1973.

== School building ==
The six-storey school building has 39 teaching rooms. It is located opposite Kwai Hing station of the Mass Transit Railway (MTR) system.

== Faculty ==
As of 2021, the school employed 54 teachers. The principal is Ms. Chan Sai Wing.
