= KCH =

KCH may refer to:

- Kamuzu Central Hospital in Lilongwe, Malawi
- Kennedy Center Honors
- King's College Hospital in London
- Knight Commander of the Royal Guelphic Order of the House of Hanover
- Knowledge Channel, Philippine educational TV channel
- Kosciusko Community Hospital in Warsaw, Indiana, United States
- Kuching International Airport, in Malaysia
- Kwai Chung Hospital, a psychiatric hospital in Kwai Chung, Hong Kong
