= India International Centre for Buddhist Culture and Heritage =

Pilgrimage and tourist attraction

India International Centre for Buddhist Culture and Heritage is sponsored by International Buddhist Confederation in Lumbini, Nepal as a world class pilgrimage and tourism attraction.

== History ==
The Centre construction is funded by Lumbini Development Trust. The centre received an investment of 1 billion Indian Rupees and is expected to take three years to complete, in 2025

== Facilities ==
India International Centre for Buddhist Culture and Heritage will have following facilities for pilgrims:

- administration office
- place for meditation
- halls for doing regular prayer
- library with collection of many books
- area for cafeteria
- other required facilities like toilets and bathrooms

== See also ==
- Buddhism in Nepal
