= Kowloon West Cluster =

- 九龍西醫院聯網
- Region served: HK
- Services: Health care
- Cluster Chief Executive: Dr. Law Chun-bon, Alexander
- Parent organisation: Hospital Authority
- Staff: 14,076

Kowloon West Cluster (Chinese: 九龍西醫院聯網; KWC) is one of the six hospital clusters managed by Hospital Authority in Hong Kong. It consists of 5 public hospitals and 16 family medicine clinics (FMC) (formerly known as general outpatient clinics (GOPC) (Note: GOPCs have been officially renamed to FMCs in Oct 2025, see this press release)) to provide public healthcare services for the population of Sham Shui Po, Kwai Tsing, Tsuen Wan and North Lantau. In mid-2012, the population was 1,887,600. The current cluster chief executive as of June 2026 is Dr. Law Chun-bon, Alexander.

== Services ==
Kowloon West Cluster operates the following five hospitals of various capabilities to provide a range of acute, convalescent, rehabilitation, and infirmary inpatient and ambulatory care services to the public in the areas of Wong Tai Sin, Mong Kok, Sham Shui Po, Kwai Tsing, Tsuen Wan and North Lantau. In mid-2012, the population of the areas was 1,887,600.

- Caritas Medical Centre (CMC)
- Kwai Chung Hospital (KCH)
- North Lantau Hospital (NLTH)
- Princess Margaret Hospital (PMH)
- Yan Chai Hospital (YCH)

In addition to the specialist outpatient clinics in all the eight hospitals, Kowloon West Cluster operates three other specialist outpatient clinics:

- East Kowloon Polyclinic
- Ha Kwai Chung Outpatient Clinic
- Yau Ma Tei Specialist Clinic Extension

Kowloon West Cluster also operates 16 general outpatient clinics:

- Caritas Medical Centre Family Medicine Clinic
- Cheung Sha Wan Jockey Club General Outpatient Clinic
- East Kowloon General Outpatient Clinic
- Ha Kwai Chung General Outpatient Clinic
- Kwong Wah Hospital General Outpatient Clinic
- Lady Trench General Outpatient Clinic
- Li Po Chun General Outpatient Clinic
- Mrs Wu York Yu General Outpatient Clinic
- Mui Wo General Outpatient Clinic
- Nam Shan General Outpatient Clinic
- North Kwai Chung General Outpatient Clinic
- North Lantau Community Health Centre
- Our Lady of Maryknoll Hospital General Outpatient Clinic
- Robert Black General Outpatient Clinic
- Shek Kip Mei General Outpatient Clinic
- South Kwai Chung Jockey Club General Outpatient Clinic
- Tai O Jockey Club General Outpatient Clinic
- Tsing Yi Cheung Hong General Outpatient Clinic
- Tsing Yi Town General Outpatient Clinic
- Wang Tau Hom Jockey Club General Outpatient Clinic
- West Kowloon General Outpatient Clinic
- Wu York Yu General Outpatient Clinic
- Yan Chai Hospital General Outpatient Clinic

As of March 2013, the cluster has 6,629 beds, including 4,251 for acute care, 1,298 for convalescent, rehabilitation, infirmary and hospice care, 920 for the mentally ill, and 160 for the mentally handicapped; and served by 14,076 full-time equivalent staff.
