= Buddhist Tai Hung College =

Coordinates: 22.340108°N 114.158085°E

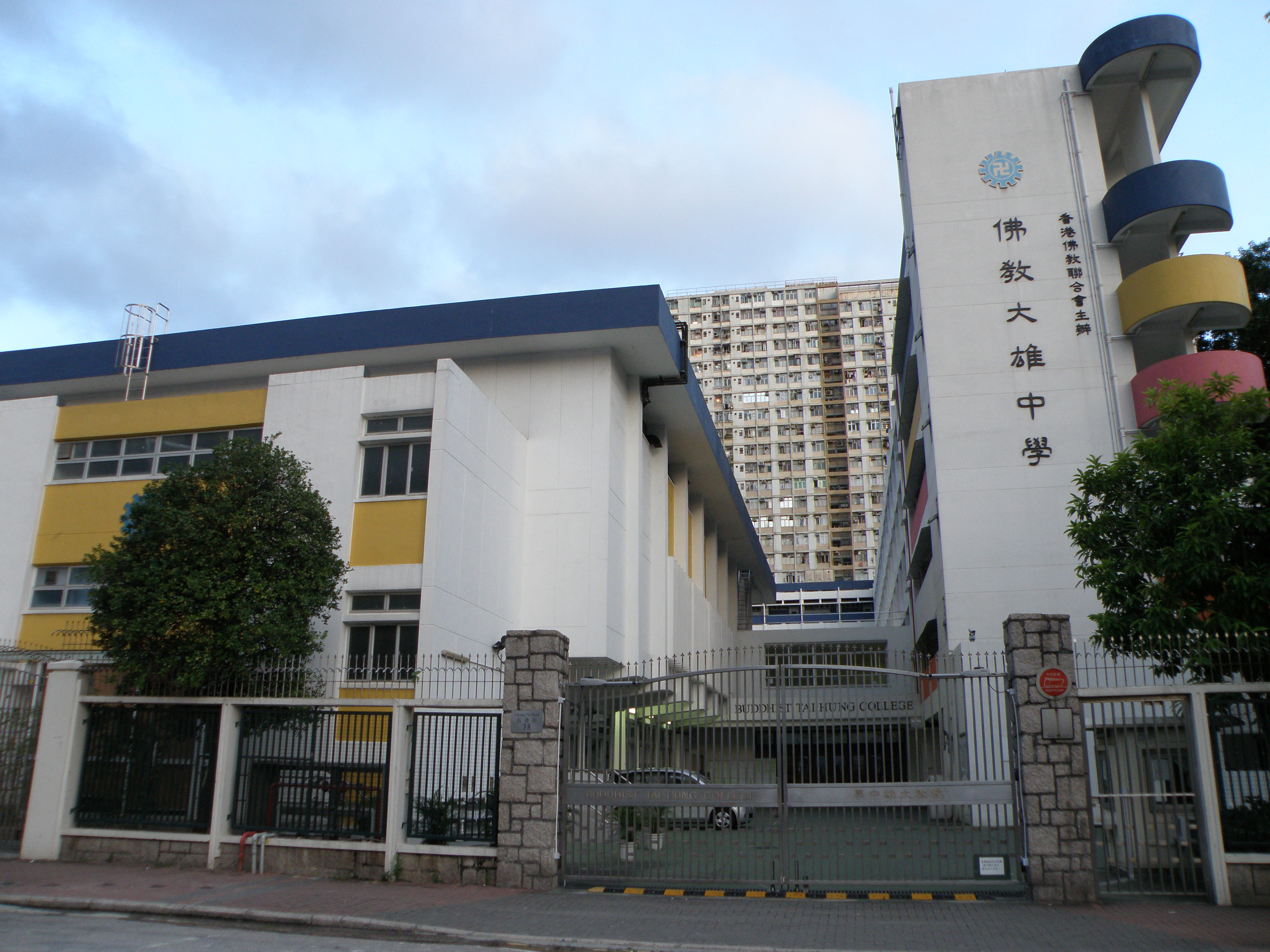

Location
- 38 Cheung Fat Street, Sham Shui Po, Kowloon

Information
- Type: Secondary School
- Motto: 「明智顯悲」 (To instill the virtues of Modesty & Integrity, Humility & Self-discipline, Industry & Thoughtfulness, Initiative & Independence, and Care & Compassion into our students.)
- Religious affiliation: Buddhism
- Established: 1969; 57 years ago
- School district: Hong KongSham Shui Po District
- President: 衍空法師
- Dean: 31
- Principal: 招康明先生
- Staff: 3
- Faculty: 59
- Grades: 6
- Nickname: BTHC
- Website: http://www2.bthc.edu.hk/

Buddhist Tai Hung College (Chinese: 佛教大雄中學) is a school. It is located in the Cheung Sha Wan area of Sham Shui Po district of Kowloon, Hong Kong, near Caritas Medical Centre. Established in 1969, it was the second school established by the Hong Kong Buddhist Association.

The school's passing rate is approximately 10% higher than that of the territory average in the HKCEE and Hong Kong Advanced Level Examination.

== Curriculum ==
Students in Levels One to Three have four classes, two of which are taught in English and two in their native language. Students in levels Four to Six have five classes.

The school offers various subjects taught in English, including Mathematics, Science, Music and Visual Arts. The Life-wide English Learning Committee is dedicated to integrating language learning and communication confidence in English-related activities.
