= World Fellowship of Buddhists =

Organization

The World Fellowship of Buddhists (WFB) is an international Buddhist organization. Initiated by Gunapala Piyasena Malalasekera, it was founded in May 1950 in Colombo, Ceylon (present-day Sri Lanka), by representatives from 27 countries. Although Theravada Buddhists are prominent in the organization, (its headquarters are in Thailand and all of its presidents have been from Sri Lanka or southeast Asia), members of all Buddhist schools are active in the WFB. It has regional centers in more than 30 countries, including India, the United States, Australia, and several nations of Africa and Europe, in addition to traditional Buddhist countries.

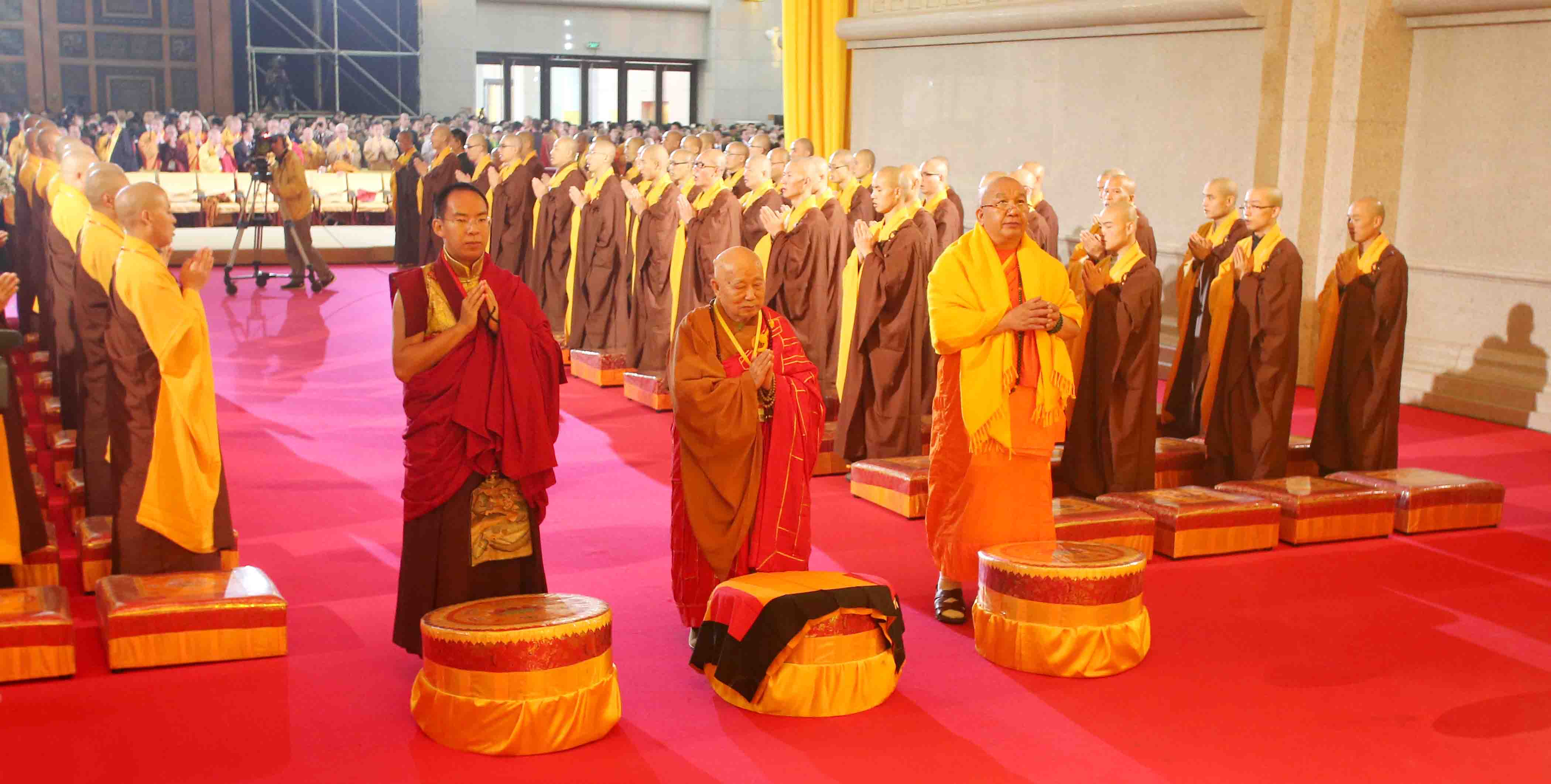
Representatives from the three major modern Buddhist traditions, at the World Fellowship of Buddhists, 27th General Conference, 2014.

The aims and objectives of the World Fellowship of Buddhists are:

1. To promote among the members strict observance and practice of the teachings of the Buddha
2. To secure unity, solidarity, and brotherhood amongst Buddhists
3. To propagate the sublime doctrine of the Buddha
4. To organize and carry on activities in the field of social, educational, cultural and other humanitarian services
5. To work for happiness, harmony and peace on earth and to collaborate with other organizations working for the same ends.

The current president is Phan Wannamethee of Thailand serving since 1999, while Venerable Hsing Yun of the Republic of China (Taiwan) served as honorary president.

== Affiliates ==
=== Australia ===
- Buddhist Council of New South Wales
- Buddhist Discussion Centre (Upwey)
- The Buddhist Federation of Australia
- The Buddhist Foundation
- United Vietnamese Buddhist Congregation in Australia & New Zealand

=== Austria ===
- Österreichische Buddhistische Religionsgesellschaft (Austrian Buddhist Union)

=== Bangladesh ===
- Agrasara Memorial Society of Bangladesh
- Anoma Cultural Association
- Bangladesh Bouddha Kristi Prachar Sangha
- Bangladesh Buddhist Association
- Bangladesh Buddhist Federation
- Bangladesh Rakhaing-Marma Sangha Council
- Parbatya Bouddha Sangha, Sakyamuni Bouddha Sangha
- The Supreme Sangha Council of Bangladesh

=== Belgium ===
- Buddhist Study Centre of Belgium
- European Buddhist Union

=== Bhutan ===
- Dratshang Lhentshog (National Council of Sangha Communities)

=== Brazil ===
- Federacao das Seitas Buddhists do Brasil
- Sociedade Budista do Brasil

=== Cambodia ===
- Buddhism Community for Development of Cambodia
- Buddhist Association Khmer Republic

=== Canada ===
- Buddhist Association of Canada Cham Shan Temple
- Buddhist Church of Canada
- International Buddhist Friends Association (IBFA)
- True Faith Buddhism Association of Canada Inc.
- Universal Buddhist Temple

=== China ===
- Buddhist Association of China

=== Czechoslovakia ===
- Dr. Dusan J. Kafka

=== Finland ===
- Bodhidharma Association

=== France ===
- Association Cultuelle Bouddhique De Marseille (Vallondes Tuves)
- Association Zen International (AZI)
- French Regional Centre of WFB
- French-Vietnamese Buddhist Association
- World Linh-Son Buddhist Congregation

=== Germany ===
- Deutsche Buddhistische Union (DBU)
- Order Arya Maitreya Mandala (AMM)

=== Ghana ===
- The Maha Bodhi Society of Ghana

=== Great Britain ===
- Amaravati Buddhist Centre
- The Buddhist Society

=== Hong Kong ===
- Hong Kong Buddhist Sangha Association
- The Hong Kong Buddhist Association
- WFB Hong Kong and Macau Regional Centre

=== India ===
- All Assam Buddhist Association
- All India Buddhist Mission
- Ambedkar Buddhist Academy
- Asoka Mission
- Bhikkhu Sangha's United Buddhist Mission
- Bouddhjan Panchayat Samiti, "Panchayatan" Dr. Ambedkar
- Buddhist International Centre
- Buddhist Society of India
- Buddhist Society Service Centre
- Department of Ecclesiastical Affairs - Sikkim
- Department of Religion and Culture
- Dharma Chakra Centre
- Dr. Babasaheb Ambedkar Samarak Samiti
- Indian Buddhist Society
- International Brotherhood Mission
- International Buddha Education Institute
- International Meditation Centre
- Kalimpong Dharmodaya Sabha
- Ladakh Buddhist Association
- Maha Bodhi Asoka Mission
- Maha Bodhi Society of India
- Pali Bhasha Adhyayan Parishad
- Pradnya Karuna Vihar Samiti, Nanded
- Shri Dadasaheb Gawai Charitable Trust, Amravati, "Kamal Pushpa"
- The Bengal Buddhist Association
- The Karmapa International Buddhist Institute
- The Sangha Mitra
- The South India Buddhist Association
- Triloka Buddha Mahasangha Sahayak Gana
- Vishwa Buddha Parishad
- Yashodhara Mahila Vikas Manda

=== Indonesia ===
- Buddha Dharma Indonesia Institution Foundation
- Gabungan Tridharma Indonesia (GTI)
- Jakarta Dhammacakka Jaya Foundation
- Perwalian Umat Buddha Indonesia 1978 (Walubi 1978)

=== Japan ===
- Japan Buddhist Federation

=== South Korea ===
- The Korea Fellowship of Buddhists
- WFB Korea Regional Centre
- Won Buddhism

=== North Korea ===
- Korea Buddhist Federation

=== Laos ===
- WFB Regional Centre

=== Malaysia ===
- Buddhist Missionary Society Malaysia
- WFB Penang Regional Centre
- WFB Selangor Regional Centre

=== Mongolia ===
- Tashi Choi Ling Monastery
- The Centre of Mongolian Buddhists

=== Myanmar ===
- Sayadaw U Thittila
- The Buddhist Discussion Group
- The Chittagong Buddhist Association

=== Nepal ===
- Dharmodaya Sabha

=== Netherlands ===
- International Zen Institute Netherlands

=== Philippines ===
- WFB Philippines Regional Centre

=== Singapore ===
- The Buddhist Union
- The Singapore Regional Centre of WFB

=== Sri Lanka ===
- All-Ceylon Buddhist Congress
- German Dharmaduta Society
- Sri Lanka Regional Centre of WFB

=== Sweden ===
- Buddhismens Venners
- Svenska Buddhistiska Samfudes

=== Taiwan ===
- Chinese Buddhist Temple Association
- Fo Guang Shan Monastery
- Han Tzang Cultural Association
- The Buddhist Association
- The Lay Buddhist Association

=== Tanzania ===
- The Buddhist Association

=== Thailand ===
- Buddhadhamma Foundation
- Dhammapradipa Association
- Luang-Poh Viriyoung Sirintharo Foundation (LVS)
- The Buddhist Association of Chon Buri Province
- The Buddhist Association of Nakhon Pathom Province
- The Buddhist Association of Thailand
- The Thai-Chinese Buddhist Association of Thailand
- The Young Buddhist Association of Thailand

=== United States ===
- Association of Vietnamese Buddhist Nuns in America
- Buddha's Universal Church
- Buddhist Churches of America
- Buddhist Sangha Council of Southern California
- Congregation of Vietnamese Buddhist in the USA
- Friends of Buddhism
- International Buddhist Meditation Centre
- International Zen Institute of America
- Khmer Buddhist Society of New England
- Los Angeles Buddhist Church Federation
- Mook Rim Buddhist Society International
- Pureland Lotus Community
- Sambosa Buddhist Temple of California
- San Francisco Zen Center
- Shasta Abbey
- Sonoma Mountain Zen Center
- The Buddhist Temple of Chicago
- Tibetan Nyingma Meditation Centre
- Union of Vietnamese Buddhist Churches in the United States of America
- Universal Buddhist Fellowship
- Vajradhatu Buddhist Meditation Centre (former)
- Vietnamese Buddhist Renovation Committee
- Vietnamese Theravada Buddhist Sangha Congregation
- WFB Hawaii Regional Centre
- Young Buddhist Association

=== USSR ===
- Central Spiritual Board of Buddhists of the USSR (former)

=== Vietnam ===
- Theravadin Buddhist Association

== See also ==
- Buddhist councils
- Index of Buddhism-related articles
- International Buddhist Confederation
- Maha Bodhi Society
- Pre-sectarian Buddhism
- World Buddhist Sangha Council
