= Global Buddhist Summit =

Conference for Buddhist monks

- Motto: Responses to Contemporary Challenges : Philosophy to Praxis (Hindi: समकालीन चुनौतियों के प्रति प्रतिक्रिया: दर्शन से अभ्यास तक)
- Founded: 2023
- Founder: International Buddhist Confederation

The "Global Buddhist Summit" is a conference attended by Buddhist monks from several nations. The conference is attended by scholars, leaders of the Sangha, and practitioners of the Dharma from around the world.

In 2023 summit, there were 173 attendees, including 84 members of the Sangha and 151 Indian delegates. Among the Indian participants were 46 members of the Sangha, 40 nuns, and 65 laypersons from regions outside of Delhi. The Summit's theme centered around "Responses to Contemporary Challenges: Philosophy to Praxis." 171 delegates from foreign countries and 150 delegates from Indian Buddhist organizations participated on 20–21 April 2023.

== Objectives ==
The primary objective of the summit is to address urgent global issues and explore solutions rooted in the universal values of the Buddha Dhamma. The intention is to establish a platform for lay Buddhist scholars and Dharma Masters to engage in fruitful discussions. The summit aims to delve deeply into the Buddha's teachings on Peace, Compassion, and Harmony with the ultimate goal of fostering universal peace and harmony, in alignment with the fundamental principles of Dharma. Furthermore, the summit endeavors to produce a document that can serve as a basis for further academic research, exploring its potential as a tool for international relations on a global scale.

== 2023 Summit ==
2023 Global Buddhist Summit
- Host country: India
- Date: 20-21 April 2023
- Motto: Responses to Contemporary Challenges : Philosophy to Praxis (Hindi: समकालीन चुनौतियों के प्रति प्रतिक्रिया: दर्शन से अभ्यास तक)
- Venue(s): Ashok Hotel, New Delhi
- Cities: New Delhi

The summit was hosted by Ministry of Culture in collaboration with its grantee body International Buddhist Confederation (IBC).

Together distinguished scholars, Sangha leaders, and Dharma practitioners from various parts of the world to deliberate on urgent global issues and seek solutions rooted in the universal values of the Buddha Dhamma.

Guests like the 14th Dalai Lama (Exile Tibet), Khamba Lama Gabju Choijamts Demberel (Mongolia), Chamgon Kenting Tai Situpa (Tibet), Bhikshu Dhamma Shobhan Mahathero (Nepal), and Thich Thien Tan (Vietnam). To his right sat Waskaduwe Mahindawansa Mahanayake Thero (Sri Lanka), Abhidhajamaharahthaaguru Sayadaw Dr Ashin Nyanissara (Burma), Sakya Trizin, Khöndung Gyana Vajra Rinpoché (Tibet), Padma Acharya Karma Rangdol (Bhutan), Kyabjé Yongzin Ling Rinpoché Tenzin Lungtok Thinley Chöphak (Tibet) and Dr Dhammapiya (India) attended the summit.

== See also ==
- International Buddhist Confederation
- Index of Buddhism-related articles
