= Kwai Chung Hospital =

- Hospital Authority

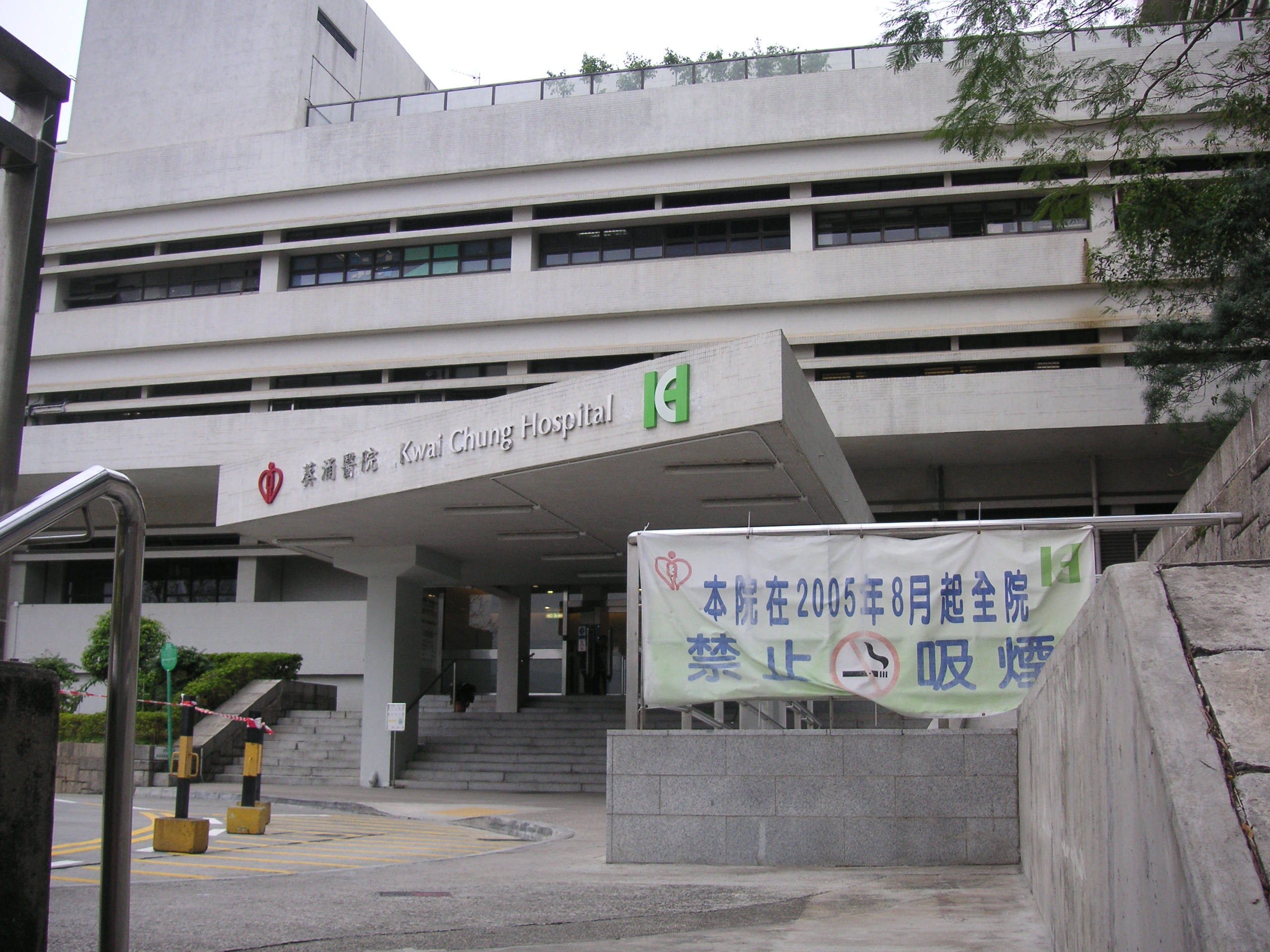

- Location within Hong Kong

Geography
- Location: 3-15 Kwai Chung Hospital Road, Kwai Chung, Hong Kong
- Coordinates: 22.34163°N 114.13448°E

Organisation
- Type: Specialist
- Affiliated university: University of Hong Kong, Open University of Hong Kong, Chinese University Hong Kong
- Network: Kowloon West Cluster

Services
- Emergency department: No, Accident and Emergency at Princess Margaret Hospital
- Beds: 920
- Speciality: Psychiatry

Helipads
- Helipad: No

History
- Founded: 15 October 1981; 44 years ago

Links
- Website: www.ha.org.hk/kch
- Lists: Hospitals in Hong Kong

Kwai Chung Hospital
- Traditional Chinese: 葵涌醫院
Transcriptions
Yue: Cantonese
- Yale Romanization: Kwàih chūng yī yún
- Jyutping: Kwai4 cung1 ji1 jyun2

Kwai Chung Hospital (Chinese: 葵涌醫院; KCH) is a psychiatric hospital in Kwai Chung, Hong Kong, located near Princess Margaret Hospital. Officially opened on 15 October 1981, the hospital currently provides 920 psychiatric beds, serving the population of Kwai Chung, Tsing Yi, Tsuen Wan, Tung Chung, North Lantau and part of Kowloon.

Apart from in-patient psychiatric services for adult psychiatric patients, it also develops psychiatric specialty services which include Child and Adolescent Psychiatric Services, Psychogeriatric Services, Community Psychiatry, Consultation Liaison Services, Substance Abuse Assessment Unit and Psychiatric Unit for Learning Disabilities.

The hospital also provides out-patient department and day hospital services for psychiatric patients at West Kowloon Psychiatric Centre and East Kowloon Psychiatric Centre.

The hospital is reachable by Lai King Hill Road.

== History ==
Kwai Chung Hospital began its operations in November 1980 and was officially opened on 15 October 1981 by the Hong Kong Governor, Murray MacLehose.
