= World Buddhist Sangha Council =

The World Buddhist Sangha Council (WBSC) is an international non-government organisation (NGO) whose objectives are to develop the exchanges of the Buddhist religious and monastic communities of the different traditions worldwide, and help to carry out activities for the transmission of Buddhism. It was founded in Colombo, Sri Lanka in May 1966. Since 1981, Ven. Pai Sheng was elected as president of WBSC and the headquarter of WBSC had moved to Taipei, Taiwan.

WBSC's current President is Ven. Liao Zhong (Chinese: 釋了中) of Taiwan; its Honorary President is Ven. Sik Kok Kwong (1919–2014) of Hong Kong, Thich Tam-Chau (Vietnamese: Thích Tâm Châu/釋心珠) of Canada. Among the members of its Board of Elders are Ven. K. Sri Dhammananda (1919–2006), Ven. Somdej Phra Buddhacarya (1928–2013).

== Countries represented ==
The World Buddhist Sangha Council has representatives from Theravada, Mahayana and Vajrayana Buddhism and from the following regions: Australia, Bangladesh, Brazil, Canada, Denmark, France, Germany, Hong Kong, India, Indonesia, Japan, South Korea, Macau, Malaysia, Mongolia, Myanmar, Nepal, New Zealand, Philippines, Singapore, Sri Lanka, Sweden, Taiwan, Thailand, the United Kingdom and the United States.

== Basic Points Unifying the Theravada and Mahayana ==
During the First Congress, the founder Secretary-General, the late Venerable Pandita Pimbure Sorata Thera requested the Ven. Walpola Rahula to present a concise formula for the unification of the different traditions, which was then unanimously approved by the Council. These are the nine "Basic points unifying Theravāda and Mahāyāna".

== See also ==
- World Buddhist Forum
- World Fellowship of Buddhists
- International Buddhist Confederation
- Sangha
