= Sik Kok Kwong =

The Most Venerable The Honourable Kok Kwong GBM GBS

Personal life
- Born: 16 May 1919 Haicheng, Liaoning, China
- Died: 16 November 2014 (aged 95) Happy Valley, Hong Kong, China
- Occupation: Founder of Heung Hoi Ching Kok Lin Association; President of the Hong Kong Buddhist Association

Religious life
- Religion: Buddhism
- Lineage: Tiantai

Senior posting
- Teacher: Yuanying (Ordination master); Baojing (lineage master)

Sik is a Buddhist honorary title and Kok Kwong is a descriptive of meritorious attributes: see dharma name.

Sik Kok Kwong
- Traditional Chinese: 釋覺光
- Simplified Chinese: 释觉光
- Hanyu Pinyin: Shì Juéguāng
Transcriptions
Standard Mandarin
- Hanyu Pinyin: Shì Juéguāng
- Wade–Giles: Shih^{1}Chüeh^{1}-kuang^{1}
Yue: Cantonese
- Yale Romanization: Sīk Gók Gwōng

Sik Kok Kwong, GBM GBS (Traditional Chinese: 釋覺光, 16 May 1919 – 16 November 2014) was a Tiantai Buddhist monk from Hong Kong and the first president of the Hong Kong Buddhist Association. He was also the Honorary Vice President of the World Buddhist Sangha Council, a member of the Hong Kong Basic Law Drafting Committee, and a Hong Kong Affairs Advisor.

== Early life ==
Born Gu Chenghai (谷成海) in Haicheng, Liaoning, Kok Kwong exhibited interest in Buddhism at an early age. At the age of nine, he left the home life and ordained as a novice monk at Haihui Temple in Shanghai in 1928. Two years later, he was introduced to Venerable Yuanying, the abbot of Tiantong Temple in Ningbo, where he received the full precepts as well as a new dharma name, Jueguang (Kok Kwong in Cantonese; lit. "Awakening of Light"). In 1939, Kok Kwong received the Tiantai lineage from Venerable Master Baojing. Through Baojing, Kok Kwong became the 46th lineage holder of the Tiantai sect. Shortly thereafter, following the Japanese invasion of China, Kok Kwong retreated to Hong Kong.

== Influence ==
In his capacity as a senior monastic, Kok Kwong established monasteries and was appointed abbot and director to many temples in Hong Kong. In 1945, Kok Kwong, together with other senior clerics, founded the Hong Kong Buddhist Association. Kok Kwong would later become the association's permanent president in 1966. As president, he oversaw the establishment of several educational institutions, such as the Chung-Hwa Institute of Buddhist Studies in 1945, the Wong Fung Ling College and the Wong Cheuk Um Primary School in 1956, and the Kok Kwong Secondary School in 1979. Hospitals, cemeteries, and the providing of social services were also established under Kok Kwong's leadership.

In Kok Kwong's later years, he along with eight venerables of various traditions proposed the World Buddhist Forum in mainland China in 2004, a suggestion that won support from Buddhist circles in countries like Japan and the Republic of Korea. He also spearheaded two tours of relics of the Buddha in 1999 and in 2003.

=== Politics ===
Kok Kwong's influence also spread toward the political sphere of Hong Kong, where he was appointed to positions as an adviser to the government following the handover of Hong Kong to the People's Republic of China. Kok Kwong was one of the earliest defenders of the Hong Kong government; for instance in a 2004 interview with the South China Morning Post, he urged Hong Kong's Buddhists to be content with the government and not to attend protests. Kok Kwong also attracted criticism for his close association with billionaire Li Ka-shing and the building of Tsz Shan Monastery, which was sponsored mostly by the Li family. In 2013, Kok Kwong was awarded the Grand Bauhinia Medal for his many years of public service.

== Death ==
In 2014, after a long illness, Kok Kwong died at 4:51am at the age of 95. Several government officials expressed condolences upon hearing news of his death.

Buddhist titles
| New creation | President of the Hong Kong Buddhist Association; 1966 – 2014 | Succeeded by Sik Chi Wai |
