= Yan Chai Hospital =

- Hospital Authority and the Board of Directors of Yan Chai Hospital

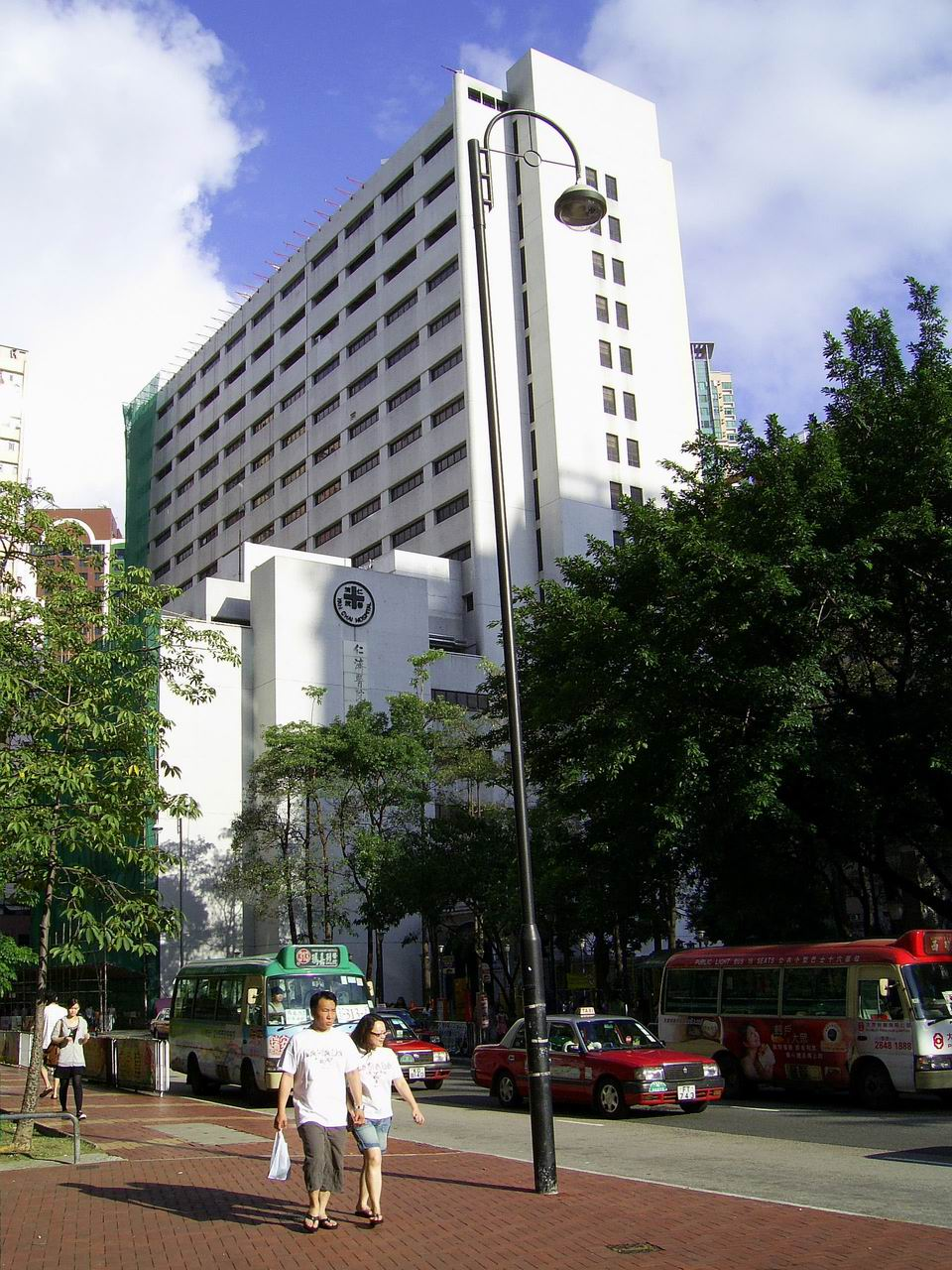
- The main service building (Block B) of Yan Chai Hospital

- Location within Hong Kong

Geography
- Location: 7-11 Yan Chai Street, Tsuen Wan, New Territories, Hong Kong
- Coordinates: 22.3697°N 114.1197°E

Organisation
- Care system: Public
- Type: District General, Community
- Affiliated university: Yan Chai Hospital Chow Cheuk Ming School of Nursing
- Network: Kowloon West Cluster

Services
- Emergency department: Yes, Accident and Emergency

Helipads
- Helipad: No

History
- Founded: 28 August 1973; 52 years ago

Links
- Website: www.yanchai.org.hk
- Lists: Hospitals in Hong Kong

Yan Chai Hospital
- Traditional Chinese: 仁濟醫院
- Simplified Chinese: 仁济医院
Transcriptions
Standard Mandarin
- Hanyu Pinyin: Rén Jì Yīyuàn
Yue: Cantonese
- Yale Romanization: Yàhnjai Yīyún
- Jyutping: jan4 zai3 ji1 jyun6*2

Yan Chai Hospital (Chinese: 仁濟醫院; Cantonese Yale: Yàhnjai Yīyún; YCH) is a Charitable hospital has under the Kowloon West Cluster of the Hospital Authority, providing acute and extended care services to the Tsuen Wan community and its neighbouring areas. The hospital was founded by the Yan Chai Hospital Board of Directors in 1973.

== History ==
Yan Chai Hospital opened its doors to patients on 28 August 1973, and was officially opened on 24 October that year by the Hong Kong Governor, Murray MacLehose. The hospital was built and equipped at a cost of about HK$5.5 million, of which HK$1.7 million was funded by the Hong Kong Government, HK$0.4 million by the Royal Hong Kong Jockey Club, and the rest by the directors of the hospitals.
