= Buddhist Wong Fung Ling College =

Secondary school in Wan Chai, Hong Kong

Coordinates: 22.2760°N 114.1903°E

- Traditional Chinese: 佛教黃鳳翎中學
- Simplified Chinese: 佛教黄凤翎中学
Transcriptions
Standard Mandarin
- Hanyu Pinyin: Fójiào Huáng Fèng Líng Zhōngxué

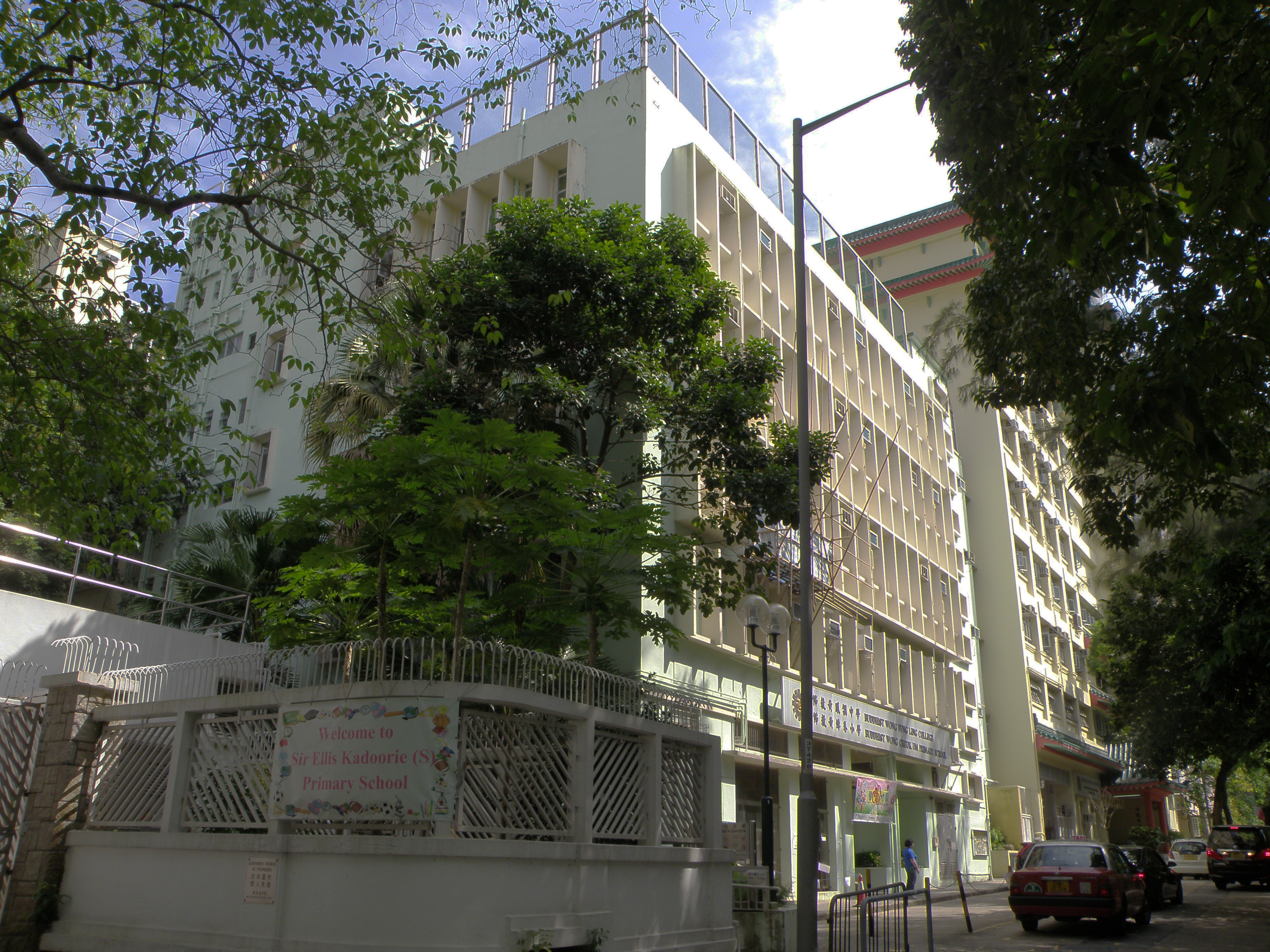
Buddhist Wong Fung Ling College

Buddhist Wong Fung Ling College is a secondary school in Causeway Bay, Wan Chai District, Hong Kong. It first opened in 1959. A government-aided school, it is sponsored by the Hong Kong Buddhist Association.

== Campus ==
The school campus is about 4,600 square metres (50,000 sq ft) in size. It has a student activity center, a Chinese room, two halls, and an interactive laboratory.

== Student body ==
Its students include Chinese and those from other countries, such as India, Indonesia, Pakistan, the Philippines, Thailand, and the United Kingdom.
