= North Lantau Hospital =

- Hospital Authority
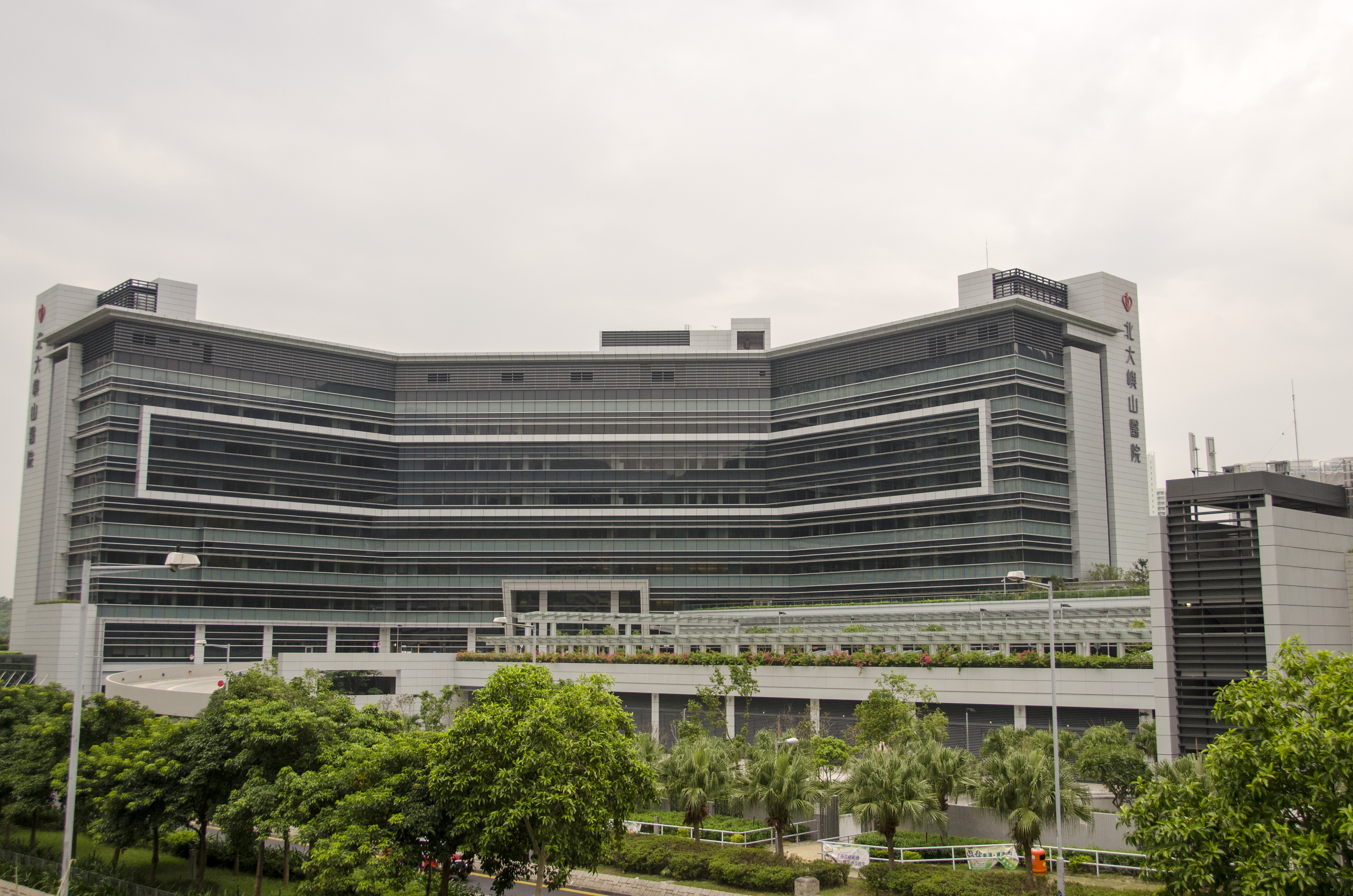

- Location within Hong Kong

Geography
- Location: 8 Chung Yan Road, Tung Chung, Lantau, Hong Kong
- Coordinates: 22.2825000°N 113.9391667°E

Organisation
- Type: District
- Network: Kowloon West Cluster

Services
- Emergency department: Yes, Accident and Emergency
- Beds: 160

History
- Founded: 24 September 2013; 12 years ago

Links
- Lists: Hospitals in Hong Kong

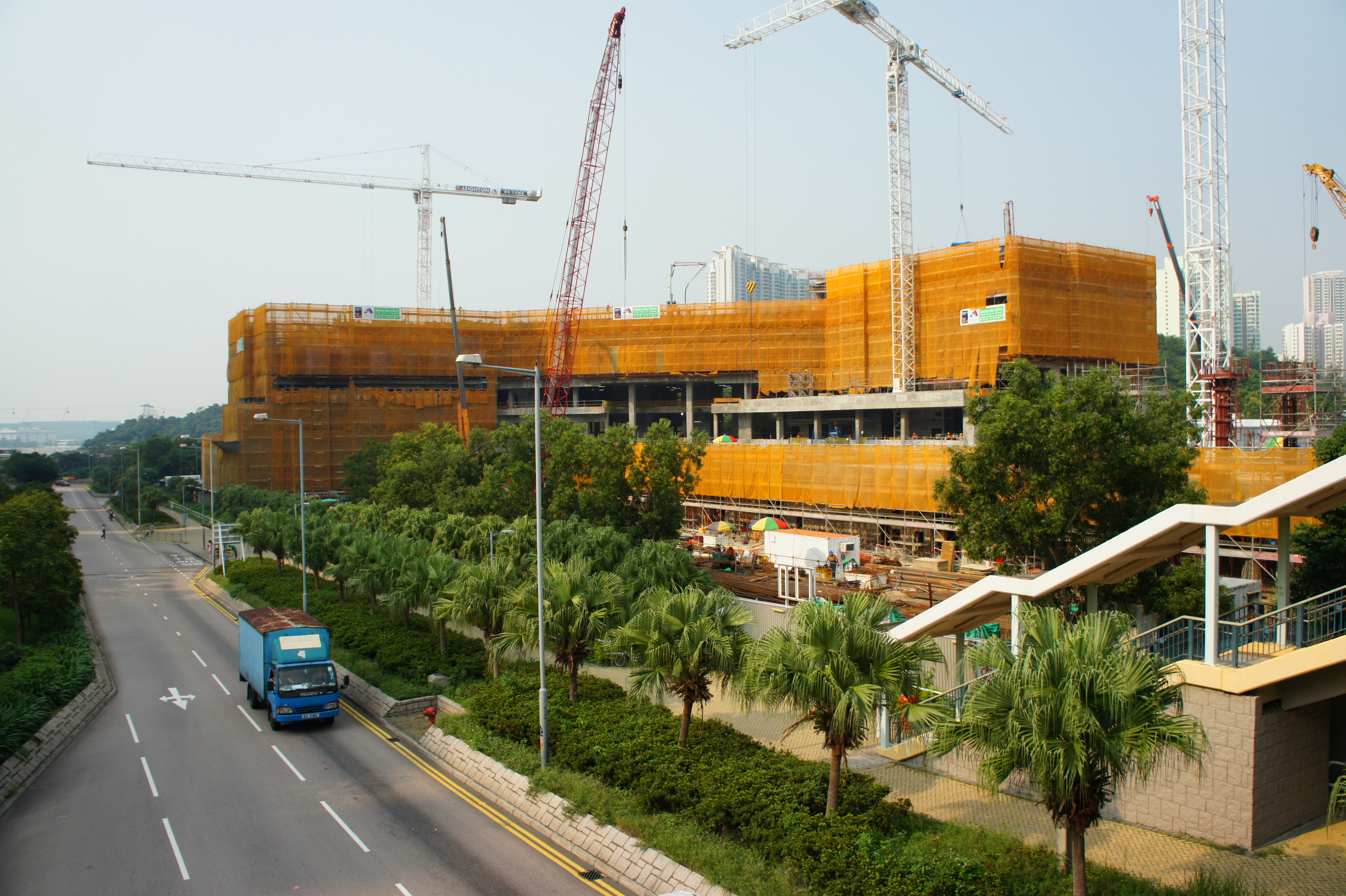
North Lantau Hospital under construction in October 2011

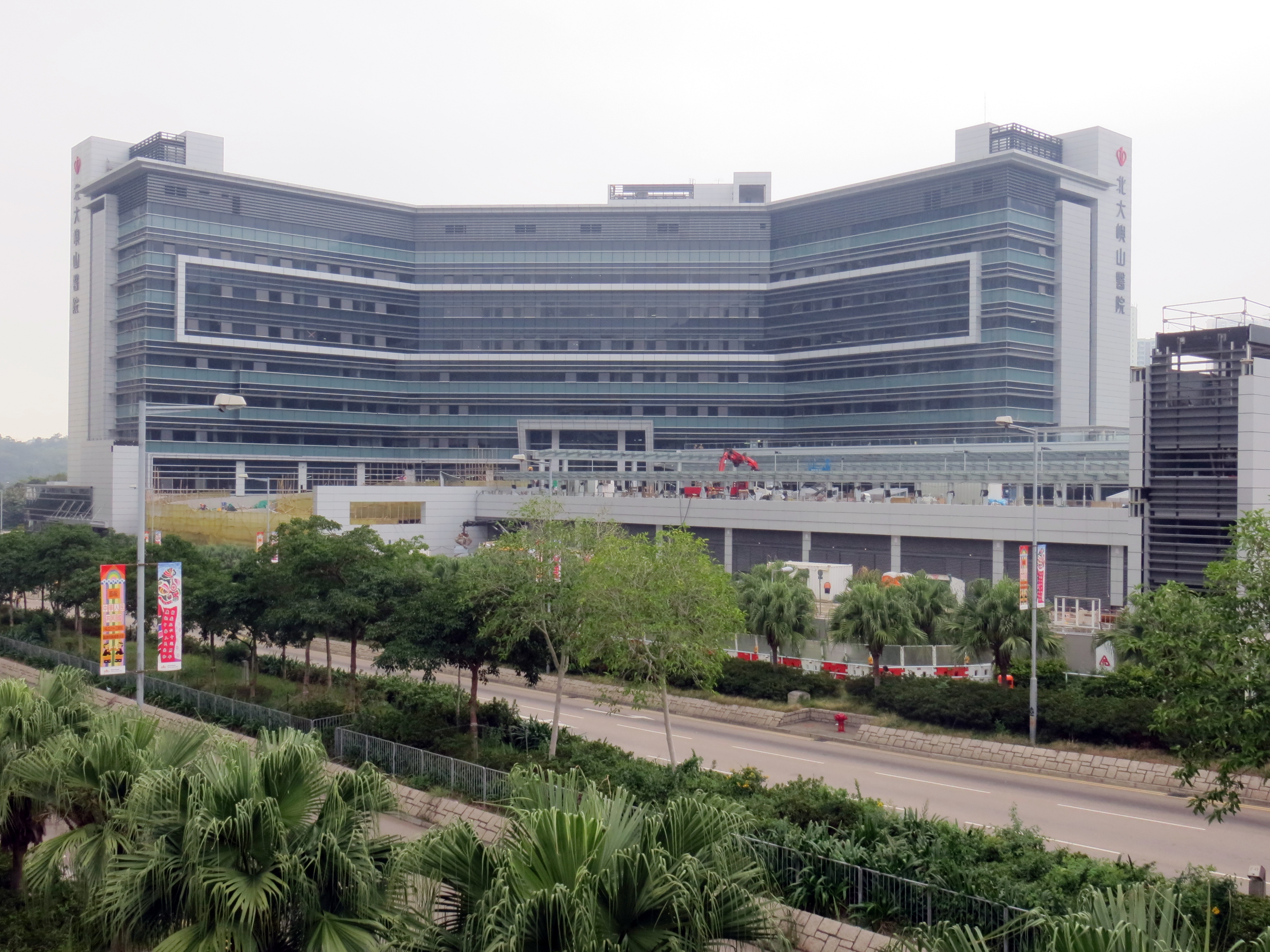
North Lantau Hospital under construction in November 2012

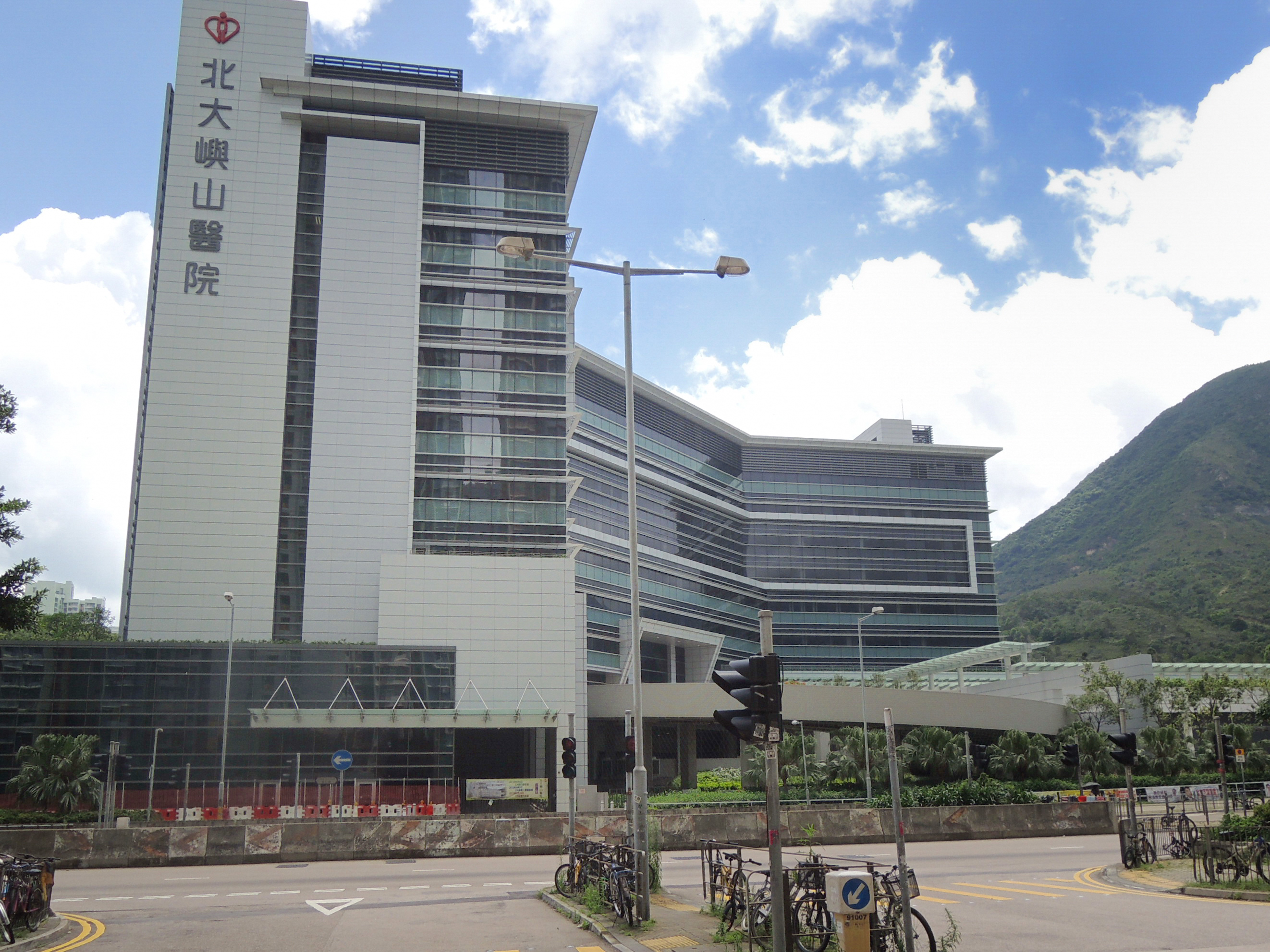
North Lantau Hospital under construction in May 2013

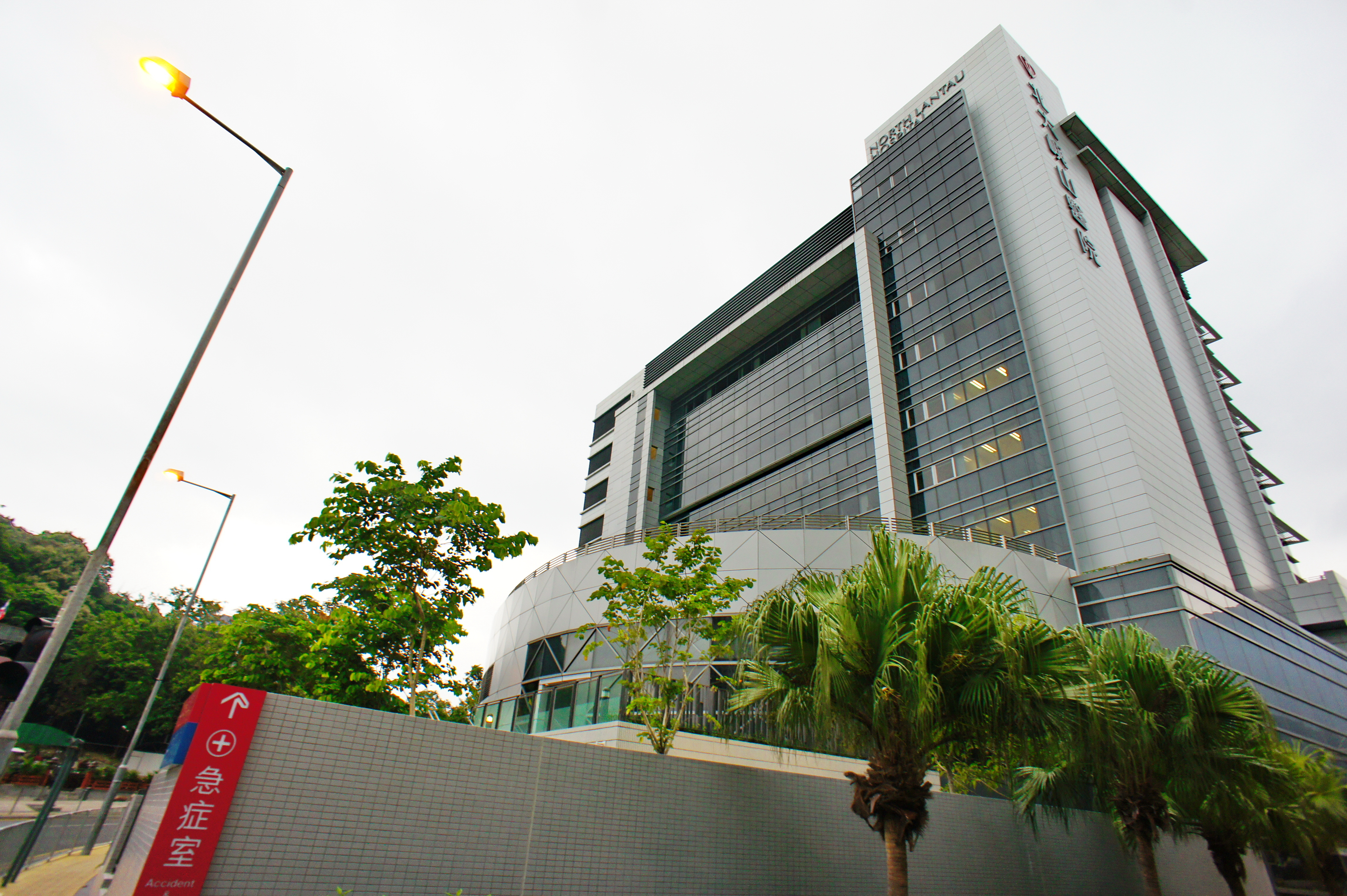
It is built near the junction of Chui Kwan Drive (left) and Chung Yan Road (right). Photo taken in November 2013

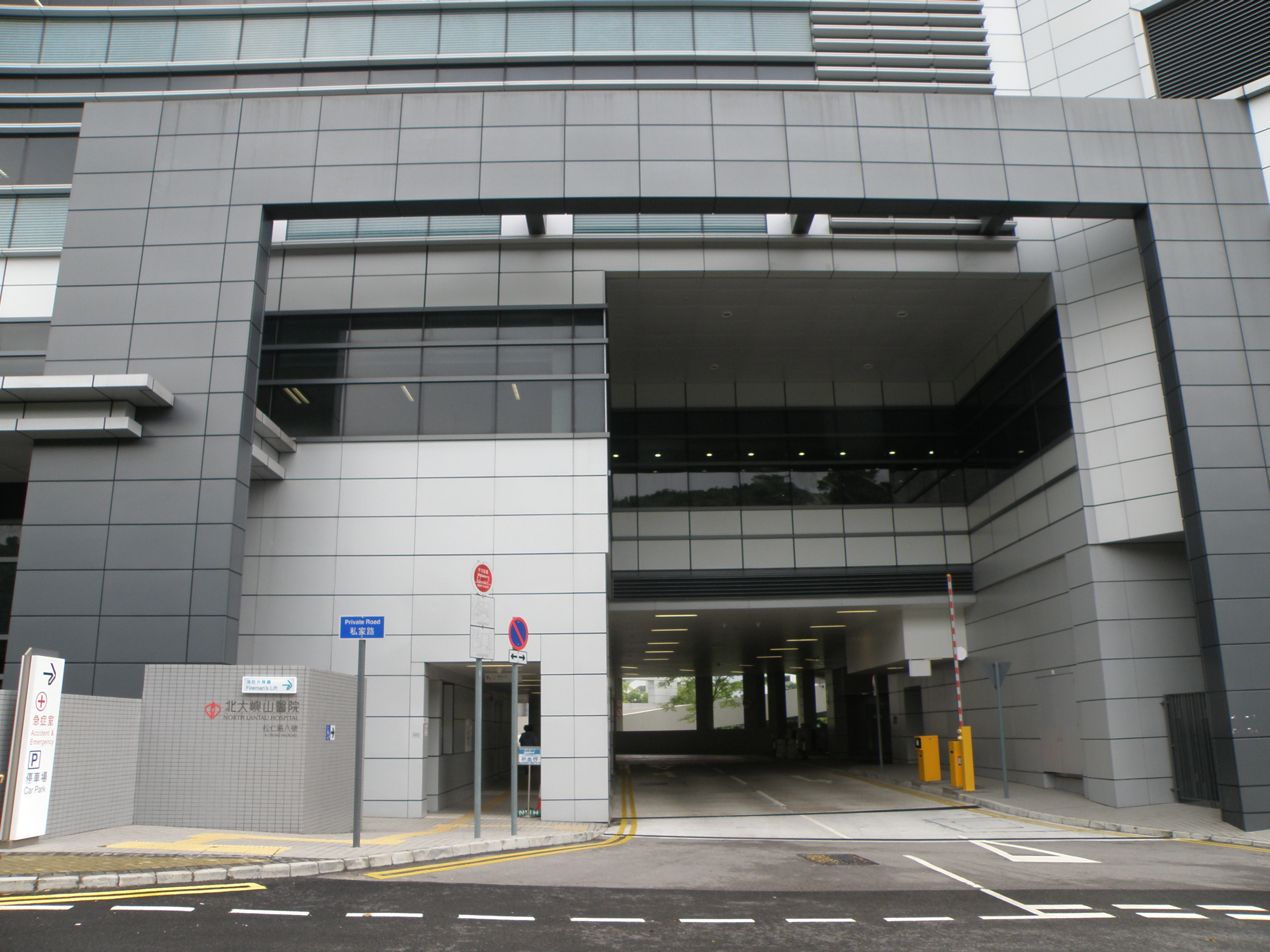
Access for Accident & Emergency Service. Photo taken in October 2014

North Lantau Hospital (Chinese: 北大嶼山醫院; Cantonese Yale: Bāk Daaihyùhsāan Yīyún; NLTH) is a rural general hospital in central Tung Chung, on Lantau Island, Hong Kong. It was completed in late 2012 and began services on 24 September 2013. The hospital has a 24-hour accident and emergency service, and various outpatient services including the North Lantau Community Health Centre. This hospital belongs to Kowloon West Cluster of Hospital Authority.

== Services ==
- Accident and Emergency Service: It has been providing 24-hour service after 25 September 2014 onward.

== Incidents ==
The hospital was criticised in August 2015 after an elderly man collapsed at the hospital's bus stop. Staff took 20 minutes to transport the man to the hospital, only 30 metres away. Health minister Ko Wing-man said that accident and emergency department staff took some time to gather the necessary resuscitation equipment. Hong Kong Doctors Union president Henry Yeung Chiu-fat said that personnel should have been ready and called the delay "unbelievable".
