= Caritas Medical Centre =

- Hospital Authority and Caritas Hong Kong
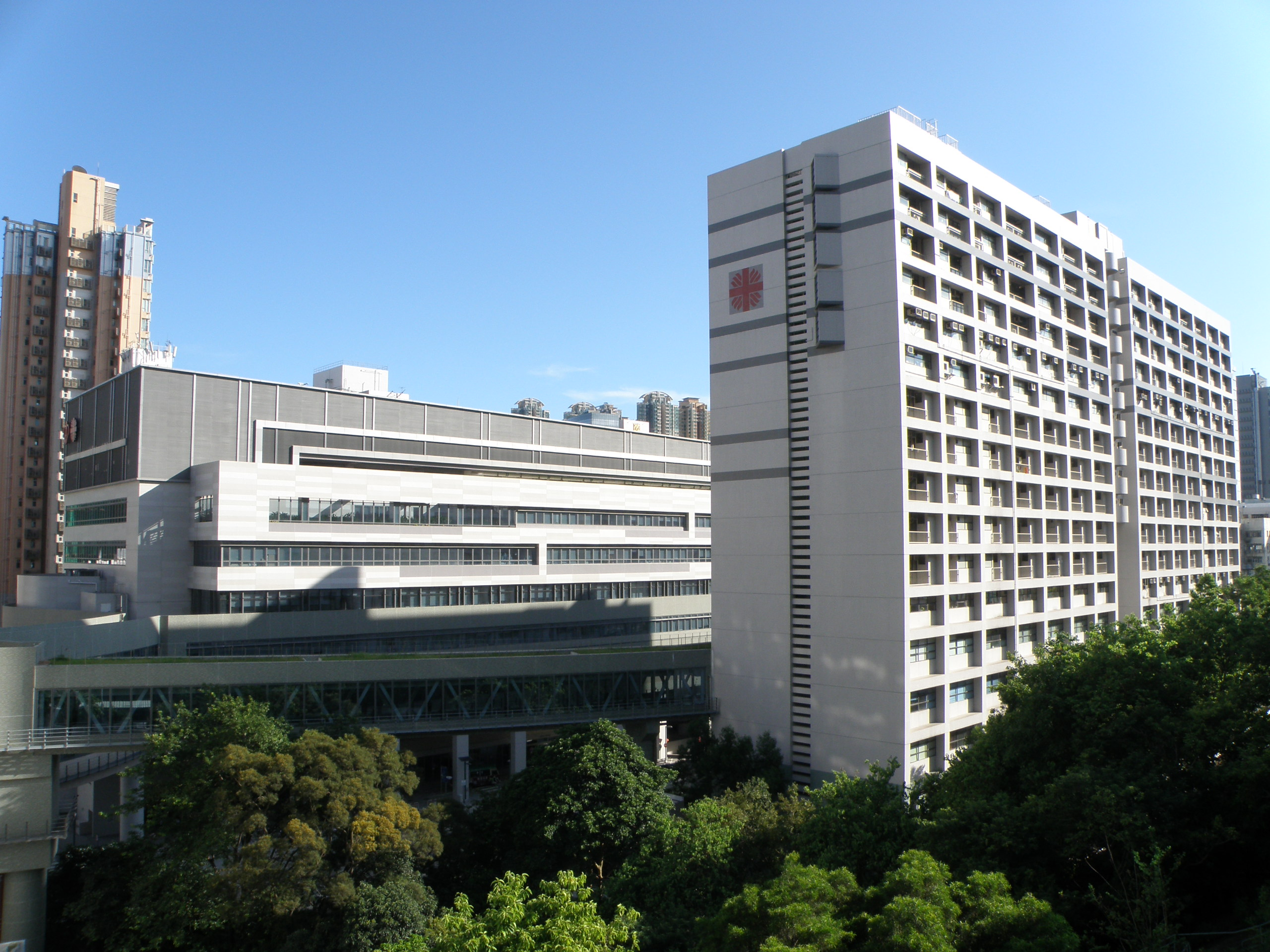
- Caritas Medical Centre

- Location within Hong Kong

Geography
- Location: 111 Wing Hong Street, Cheung Sha Wan, Kowloon, Hong Kong
- Coordinates: 22.3411111°N 114.1527778°E

Organisation
- Care system: Public
- Type: District General, Regional
- Religious affiliation: Roman Catholic
- Affiliated university: School of Nursing Cartius Medical Centre
- Network: Kowloon West Cluster

Services
- Emergency department: Yes, 24 hour Accident and Emergency
- Beds: 1,206

History
- Founded: 17 December 1964; 61 years ago

Links
- Lists: Hospitals in Hong Kong

Caritas Medical Centre (Chinese: 明愛醫院; Cantonese Yale: Mìhng'oi Yīyún; CMC) is a Roman Catholic founded district general hospital in So Uk, Cheung Sha Wan, New Kowloon, Hong Kong. It is the largest hospital in Sham Shui Po District and co-managed by the Hospital Authority and Caritas Hong Kong.

== History ==
Caritas Medical Centre was founded by Caritas Hong Kong and opened by the Hong Kong Governor, David Trench, on 17 December 1964.

The centre is now an acute general hospital with 1,206 beds situated in Shamshuipo. It provides acute and rehabilitation care, ambulatory and community medical services, including a 24-hour accident and emergency service, general outpatient service, and inpatient and outpatient specialist services in a one-stop setting – so-called single episode care. The hospital maintains ties with its parent organisation, Caritas Hong Kong, and a strong Catholic culture under the motto "Love in the Service of Hope".

== Services ==
The hospital supporting services include Pathology, Radiology, Anaesthesiology and Allied Health services. Other ambulatory and outreach community services include Geriatric day hospital and Community Geriatric Assessment Team, Community Nursing service, and Palliative Home Care service. The services provided reflect the needs of the population served - ageing, low income, new immigrants.

Caritas Medical Centre is the referral centre of the Kowloon West Cluster of the Hospital Authority in ophthalmology service serving the Kowloon west region. Caritas Medical Centre ophthalmology team provides ophthalmic support to Kwong Wah Hospital (KWH), although it is now a hospital in Kowloon Central Cluster. The Orthopaedic Rehabilitation Service for Kowloon West Cluster is also based at Caritas Medical Centre. Despite being an acute general hospital, it does not provide obstetric service (gynaecology service is available). The Palliative Care Unit (inpatient and home care team) serves patients referred from hospitals of the Kowloon West Cluster. The hospital runs the largest Developmental Disabilities Unit (Project Sunshine, Chinese: 陽光之家) for the entire territory of Hong Kong, to provide treatment, training and daily care for severely mentally handicapped patients under the age of 16 in a home-like setting. Although not a university hospital, it does provide clinical training for medical and nursing students from the local universities.

== Specialties ==
- Acute and Rehabilitative Medicine and Geriatrics
- Acute and Rehabilitative Orthopaedics and Traumatology
- Coronary Care
- Otorhinolaryngology (ENT, or Ear Nose and Throat) (on sessional basis)
- Gynaecology (no obstetric unit)
- Intensive Care Unit
- Ophthalmology
- Oral-Maxillofacial Surgery and Dental Unit (OMS)
- Paediatrics and Adolescent Medicine
- Paediatric Developmental Disabilities
- Palliative Care
- Psychiatry (on sessional basis)
- Surgery
- Pathology
- Diagnostic Radiology

== Controversies ==
The hospital has been involved in serious governance issues. In 2008, a man suffered a heart attack outside the hospital. His son ran for help from a hospital receptionist, but she told him to dial 999. After a lengthy delay in getting the man to the accident and emergency department, he was pronounced dead. The Hospital Authority subsequently reprimanded senior management of the hospital and ordered them to improve staff training and develop a plan to improve staff responsiveness.

On 10 June 2010, the hospital discovered that a computer disc containing the personal information of more than 3,000 eye patients had been stolen from a locked room. The theft was not publicly announced for more than a week.

== Recent development ==
To meet increasing demand, Caritas Medical Centre has undergone a major redevelopment project. Phase I, completed in 2002, comprised a new 14-storey building, called the Wai Shun Block, which accommodates all acute services.

The second phase of the redevelopment project was approved by the Legislative Council in 2007. It comprised a redeveloped ambulatory and rehabilitation building, the Wai Ming Block, which topped-out in 2013. The Wai Tak, Wai On, and Wai Yan Blocks were demolished to make way for a new rehabilitation garden. The project was completed in 2015 and officially opened in 2016.
