= Hong Kong Buddhist Association =

- Traditional Chinese: 香港佛教聯合會
- Simplified Chinese: 香港佛教联合会
Transcriptions
Standard Mandarin
- Hanyu Pinyin: Xiānggǎng Fójiào Liánhéhuì
Yue: Cantonese
- Jyutping: hoeng1 gong2 fat6 gaau3 lyun4 hap6 wui2

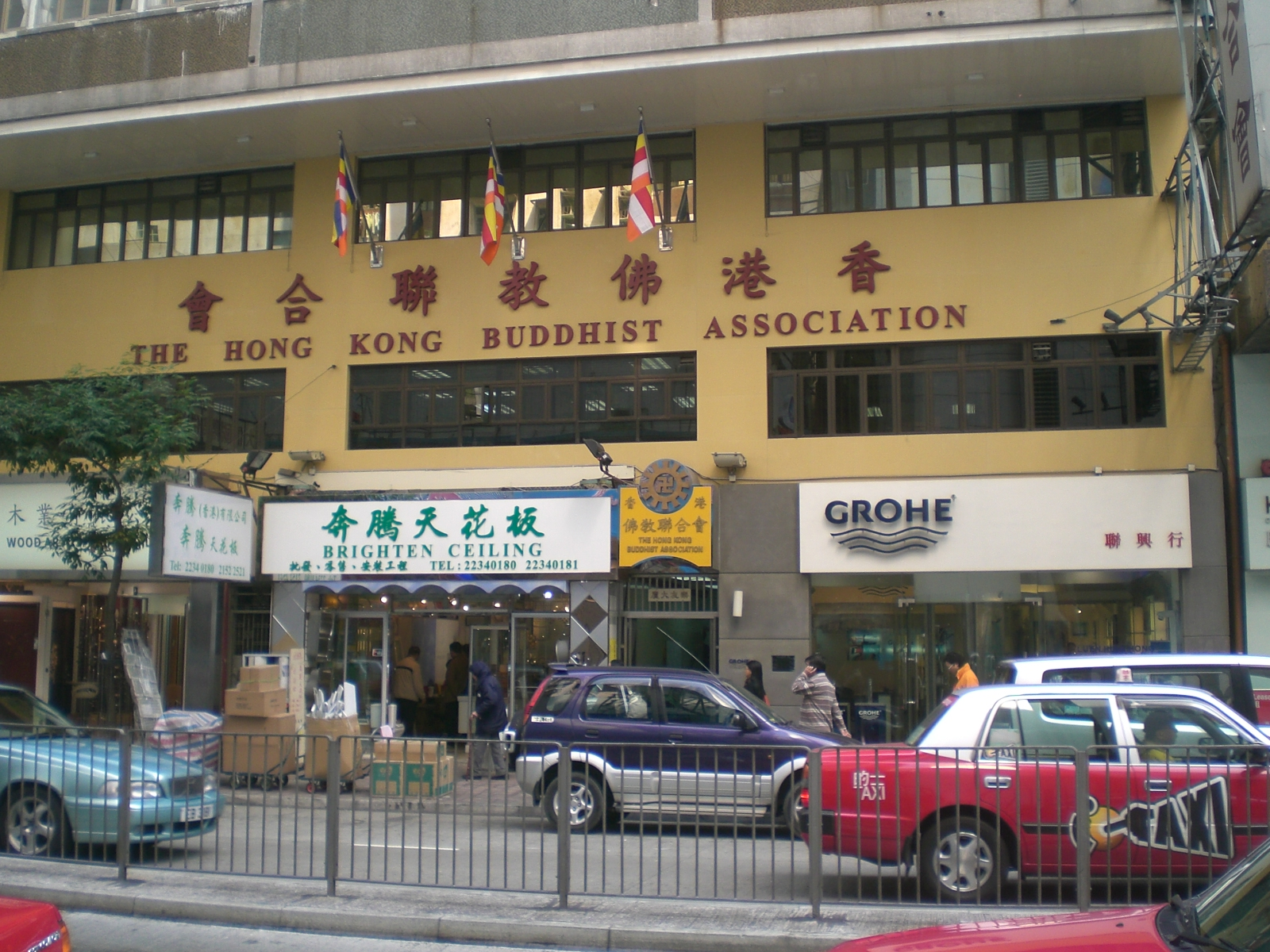
Headquarters of HKBA on Lockhart Road.

Hong Kong Buddhist Association (Chinese: 香港佛教聯合會; Jyutping: hoeng1 gong2 fat6 gaau3 lyun4 hap6 wui2) is a Buddhist umbrella organisation in Hong Kong which was founded in 1945. The association has nearly ten thousands individual members including both monastic and laity, and promotes the propagation of Buddhism in Hong Kong. It also provides a series of charity services in Hong Kong, including education, medical, child care, youth activities, elderly care and burial.

== Notable projects ==
=== Meditation project ===
With the support of D. H. Chen Foundation, HKBA has started a project in 2016 by teaching meditation (based on Maha-satiphatthana) to the secondary school students in order to promote their mental and physical well-being. Meditation rooms were also set up in the HKBA-affiliated thirteen secondary schools.

== Education and social welfare ==
There are thirteen secondary schools, seven primary schools and eight kindergartens established by HKBA, amongst which namely:

=== Primary schools ===
- Buddhist Chi King Primary School
- Buddhist Chan Wing Kan Memorial School
- Buddhist Chung Wah Kornhill Primary School
- Buddhist Lam Bing Yim Memorial School
- Buddhist Lim Kim Tian Memorial Primary School
- Buddhist Wong Cheuk Um Primary School
- Buddhist Wing Yan School

=== Secondary schools ===
- Buddhist Fat Ho Memorial College
- Buddhist Ho Nam Kam College
- Buddhist Hung Sean Chau Memorial College
- Buddhist Kok Kwong Secondary School
- Buddhist Mau Fung Memorial College
- Buddhist Sin Tak College
- Buddhist Sum Heung Lam Memorial College
- Buddhist Tai Hung College
- Buddhist Tai Kwong Chi Hong College
- Buddhist Wai Yan Memorial College
- Buddhist Wong Fung Ling College
- Buddhist Wong Wan Tin College
- Buddhist Yip Kei Nam Memorial College

The association also runs the Hong Kong Buddhist Hospital, which was founded in 1971. The association also managed the Hong Kong Buddhist Cemetery, which was completed and opened on 1963.
