= Princess Margaret Hospital (Hong Kong) =

- Hospital Authority

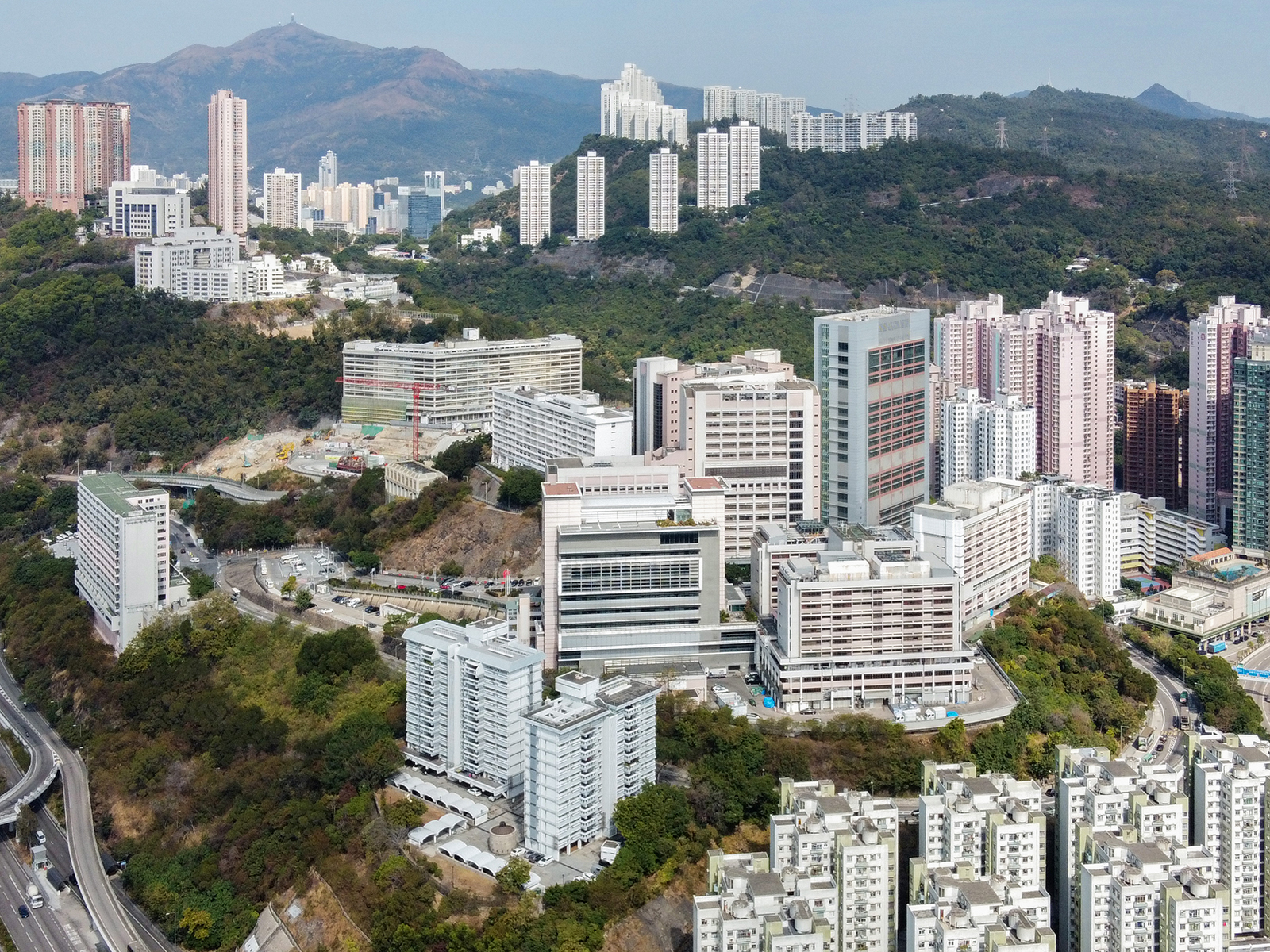

- Location within Hong Kong

Geography
- Location: 2-10 Princess Margaret Hospital Road, Sham Shui Po, Hong Kong
- Coordinates: 22.34016°N 114.13467°E

Organisation
- Care system: Public
- Type: District General, Teaching
- Affiliated university: School of Nursing, Princess Margaret Hospital, Li Ka Shing Faculty of Medicine of University of Hong Kong and CUHK Faculty of Medicine
- Network: Kowloon West Cluster

Services
- Emergency department: Yes, Accident and Emergency and trauma centre
- Beds: 1,733

Helipads
- Helipad: No

History
- Founded: 20 October 1975; 50 years ago

Links
- Lists: Hospitals in Hong Kong

Princess Margaret Hospital (Chinese: 瑪嘉烈醫院; Cantonese Yale: Máhgāliht Yīyún; PMH) is a major acute district general hospital in Sham Shui Po District, Kowloon, located in 2-10 Princess Margaret Hospital Road, Lai Chi Kok, Kowloon, Hong Kong, managed by the Hospital Authority. It provides services for patients from Lai Chi Kok, Lower Kwai Chung, Tsing Yi, Tsuen Wan, and Tung Chung and Lantau Islands.

Although it is not the main teaching hospital in Hong Kong, it also provides clinical teaching for medical students from medical college in Hong Kong, as well as providing internship placement.

Princess Margaret Hospital provides tertiary specialist services in urology and nephrology.

== Background ==
Princess Margaret Hospital was opened on 20 October 1975, named after the late Princess Margaret, Countess of Snowdon, sister of the late Queen Elizabeth II. It is the flagship hospital in the Kowloon West Cluster of the Hospital Authority.

== Services ==
Princess Margaret Hospital has 1,733 beds and nearly 5,000 staff, provides 24-hour accident and emergency service and a wide range of specialist, ambulatory and convalescent services. It is a tertiary referral centre for infectious diseases, nephrology, and urology in the whole territory. It is also the cluster referral centre for oncology, renal transplant and dialysis, lithotripsy, pulmonary medicine and tuberculosis, high risk obstetrics care, and paediatric and neonatal intensive care.

A 20-bed Intensive Care Unit is also situated in the CD block of the hospital. Its specialist outpatient clinic is situated at Block K, Princess Margaret Hospital.

With the opening of the Hong Kong International Airport in July 1998, the Hospital provides acute care for international travellers. Moreover, it is one of the major receiving hospitals for victims in airport disasters.

As a specialised training institute recognised by the Hong Kong Academy of Medicine, Princess Margaret Hospital provides bedside teaching and clinical attachment for medical students and offers intern placement for graduates.

Infectious Disease Centre (IDC) and the Hospital Authority Toxicology Reference Laboratory are situated at PMH serving the entire Hospital Authority.

Lai King Building (LKB), an annex block of the hospital is situated at Lai King Hill, about 5-minute drive away from main block of PMH. It provides convalescent and rehabilitation support for PMH patients, with 268 beds, of which 93 are infirmary beds.
