= International Buddhist Confederation =

India-based Buddhist organization

International Buddhist Confederation is the biggest religious Buddhist confederation, based in Delhi, India. The architect of the International Buddhist Confederation is Lama Lobzang. This confederation is named as the first organization which unites Buddhists from the whole world.

== See also ==
- Global Buddhist Summit
- World Fellowship of Buddhists
- World Buddhist Sangha Council
