= List of roads on Lantau Island =

This is a list of roads in Lantau Island, Islands District/Tsuen Wan District, Hong Kong. This list only includes vehicular roads, those designed for passage by cars. Trails are included in a separate list at the end.

== List of major roads on Lantau ==
This includes all major roads on Lantau Island, which connect different regions across Lantau. For intra-regional roads, please see the next section.

Name	Location and length	History and Notes	Notable Places	Photo	Coordinates
Cheung Tung Road (翔東路)	From Sunny Bay to Tung Chung.	Single two-way road running parallel to North Lantau Highway, for which it serves as frontage road.	Discovery Bay Tunnel, Oyster Bay station (planned), Tai Ho Wan, Tung Chung East station (planned), Tung Chung station		
Chung Yan Road (松仁路)	In Tung Chung, near Yat Tung Estate.		North Lantau Hospital		
Keung Shan Road (羗(羌)山道)					
Lantau Link (青嶼幹線)	Roadway linking Hong Kong International Airport to the urban areas in Hong Kong. 3.5 kilometres (2.2 mi) long.	Officially opened on 27 April 1997. Opened to traffic on 22 May 1997. It carries a railway as well as roads.	Tsing Ma Bridge, Ma Wan Viaduct, Kap Shui Mun Bridge		
Ngong Ping Road (昂平路)	From Sham Wat Road to Ngong Ping.		Ngong Ping Village		
North Lantau Highway (北大嶼山公路)	From Chek Lap Kok (Airport Road) to Lantau Link Toll Plaza.	Opened to traffic on 22 May 1997 with Lantau Link.	Penny's Bay Highway		
Penny's Bay Highway (竹篙灣公路)	From Sunny Bay (North Lantau Highway) to Penny's Bay.				
Sham Wat Road (深屈道)					
South Lantau Road (嶼南道)	Connects Mui Wo in the east to Shek Pik in the west. Majority portion of the road is along the southern shore of Lantau Island	Construction started in 1955.	Nam Shan, Pui O, San Shek Wan, Cheung Sha, Tong Fuk, Shui Hau.		22.236°N 113.9504°E
Tai O Road (大澳道)	The west-most part of the main roads in south Lantau Island. It starts halfway down the side of Keung Shan, near Kwun Yam Monastery, and runs downhill to the fishing town of Tai O.				
Tung Chung Road (東涌道)	Connects the north and south coasts of Lantau Island. It meets South Lantau Road at Cheung Sha.				

== List of minor roads on Lantau ==
This is a list of minor roads in Lantau, not included within the previous table. It is divided into sections based on their region.

=== Tung Chung ===
==== North of Tung Chung Hill ====
Name	Location and length	History and Notes	Notable Places	Photo	Coordinates
Yi Tung Road (怡東路)	Tung Chung North; 0.9 kilometers	Exit for North Lantau Highway at Tung Chung East Interchange.			
Yu Tung Road (裕東路)	Tung Chung Central; 2.1 kilometers	Exit for North Lantau Highway at Tung Chung East Interchange.	North Lantau Hospital		
Shun Tung Road (順東路)	Tung Chung South; 0.85 kilometers	Southern Boundary of Tung Chung Town Center	Tung Chung Police Station, Tung Chung Fire Station		
Tung Chung Harbourfront Road (東涌海濱路)	Tung Chung North; 1.2 kilometers	Linkage from Chek Lap Kok towards Tung Chung North.	Tung Chung Development Pier		
Tat Tung Road (達東路)	Tung Chung South; 0.9 kilometers	Surrounds the most central section of Tung Chung. Access to Discovery Bay via Cheung Tung Road.	Tung Chung Station, Tung Chung Swimming Pool, Ngong Ping 360, Citygate Outlets, Tung Chung Bus Terminus		
Mei Tung Road (美東路)	Tung Chung South; 85 meters	Road that connects Tung Chung Crescent Blocks 5–9 to Tat Tung Road.	Tung Chung Post Office		
Hing Tung Road (興東路)	Tung Chung South; 220 meters	Loop road that connects Tung Chung Station to Tat Tung Road.	Tung Chung Station, Tung Chung Urban Taxi Stand		
Fu Tung Road (富東路)	Tung Chung South; 250 meters	Road that connects Cheung Tung Road with Tat Tung Road.	Tung Chung Sunlight Market		
Man Tung Road (文東路)	Tung Chung Central; 1.4 kilometers	Main Road in Tung Chung Central, mountainside border	Tung Chung North Park		
Wai Tung Road (惠東路)	Tung Chung Central; 250 meters	Connecting road from Man Tung Road to Tung Chung Waterfront Road			
Kin Tung Road (健東路)	Tung Chung Central; 250 meters	Cul-de-sac leading into Caribbean Coast			
Hei Tung Road (喜東路)	Tung Chung Central; 100 meters	Cul-de-sac leading to Sinopec Gas Station			
Ying Hei Road (迎禧路)	Tung Chung North; 550 meters	Continuation of Tung Chung Harbourfront Road eastward, border road towards Tung Chung North			
Ying Tung Road (迎東路)	Tung Chung North; 450 meters	Road towards all Estates in Tung Chung North.			
Ying Hong Road (迎康路)	Tung Chung North; 60 meters	Cul-de-sac leading to Century Link and The Visionary.			

==== South of Tung Chung Hill ====
Name	Location and length	History and Notes	Notable Places	Photo	Coordinates
On Tung Street (安東街)	Hillside Tung Chung; 350 meters	Restricted road from Shun Tung Road into Tung Chung Police Station and North Lantau Hospital.	Tung Chung Police Station		
Chui Kwan Drive (翠群徑)	Hillside Tung Chung; 200 meters	Access road to North Lantau Hospital.	North Lantau Hospital		
Tung Chung Road North (東涌道北)	Hillside Tung Chung; 750 meters	Connection from Chung Yan Road to Ma Wan Chung Village	Ma Wan Chung		
Chung Yan Road (松仁路)	Yat Tung; 500 meters	Main road from Tung Chung Road to Yat Tung Estate, intersecting Yu Tung Road.	North Lantau Hospital		
Yat Tung Street (逸東街)	Yat Tung; 200 meters	Access Road to Yat Tung Estate from Chung Yan Road			
Wong Lung Hang Road (黃龍坑道)	Yat Tung; 400 meters	Access Road towards Wong Lung Hang			
Pa Mei Road (壩尾路)	Yat Tung; 200 meters	Access Road to Ma Wan New Village.			
Chung Wai Street (松慧街)	Yat Tung; 100 meters	Access Road to Tung Chung CityBus Depot.			
Chung Mun Road (松滿路)	Mun Tung; 250 meters	Access Road towards Mun Tung Estate.			
Chung Yat Street (松逸街)	Mun Tung; 75 meters	Access Road towards Mun Tung Estate.			
Shek Mun Kap Road (石門甲道)	Mun Tung; 600 meters	Southernmost road of Tung Chung, Access Road towards Shek Mun Kap, Final Road before Lantau Restricted Area	Shek Mun Kap		

=== Mui Wo ===
Name	Location and length	History and Notes	Notable Places	Photo	Coordinates
Mui Wo Ferry Pier Road (梅窩碼頭路)	Mui Wo South; 900 meters	Connects South Lantau Road towards Mui Wo South and Mui Wo Ferry Pier	Mui Wo Ferry Pier		
Ngan Wan Road (銀運路)	Mui Wo South; 150 meters	Access Road in Mui Wo towards residences.			
Ngan Kwong Wan Road (銀礦灣路)	Mui Wo Village; 600 meters	Main Road from South Lantau Road towards Mui Wo Town	Mui Wo Waterfront Promenade		
Ngan Shek Street (銀石街)	Mui Wo Village; 250 meters	Main Road in Mui Wo Town	Mui Wo Swimming Pool, Mui Wo Market, Mui Wo Municipal Services Building		
Ngan Shu Street (銀樹街)	Mui Wo Village; 200 meters	Access Road from Mui Wo Town towards the west.			
Mui Wo Rural Committee Road (梅窩鄉事會路)	Mui Wo Village; 550 meters	Main Road in Mui Wo Town, northernmost road.	Mui Wo Church		
Luk Tei Tong Tsuen Path (鹿地塘村徑)	West of Mui Wo; 1.30 kilometers	Loop Access Road towards the west.	Mui Wo School, Tai Tei Tong, Luk Tei Tong		
Mui Wo Chung Hau Street (梅窩涌口街)	Mui Wo Village; 200 meters	Main road parallel to Mui Wo Rural Committee Road			
Chung Shing Street (涌盛街)	Mui Wo Village; 200 meters	Main road northward towards Wang Tong River (橫塘河)			
Tung Wan Tau Road (東灣頭路)	North of Mui Wo; 1.05 kilometers	Concrete-paved road northward towards Silvermine Bay Beach	Silvermine Bay Beach, Tung Wan Tau		

== See also ==
- List of streets and roads in Hong Kong
