= Tai O Road =

Major road on Lantau Island, Hong Kong

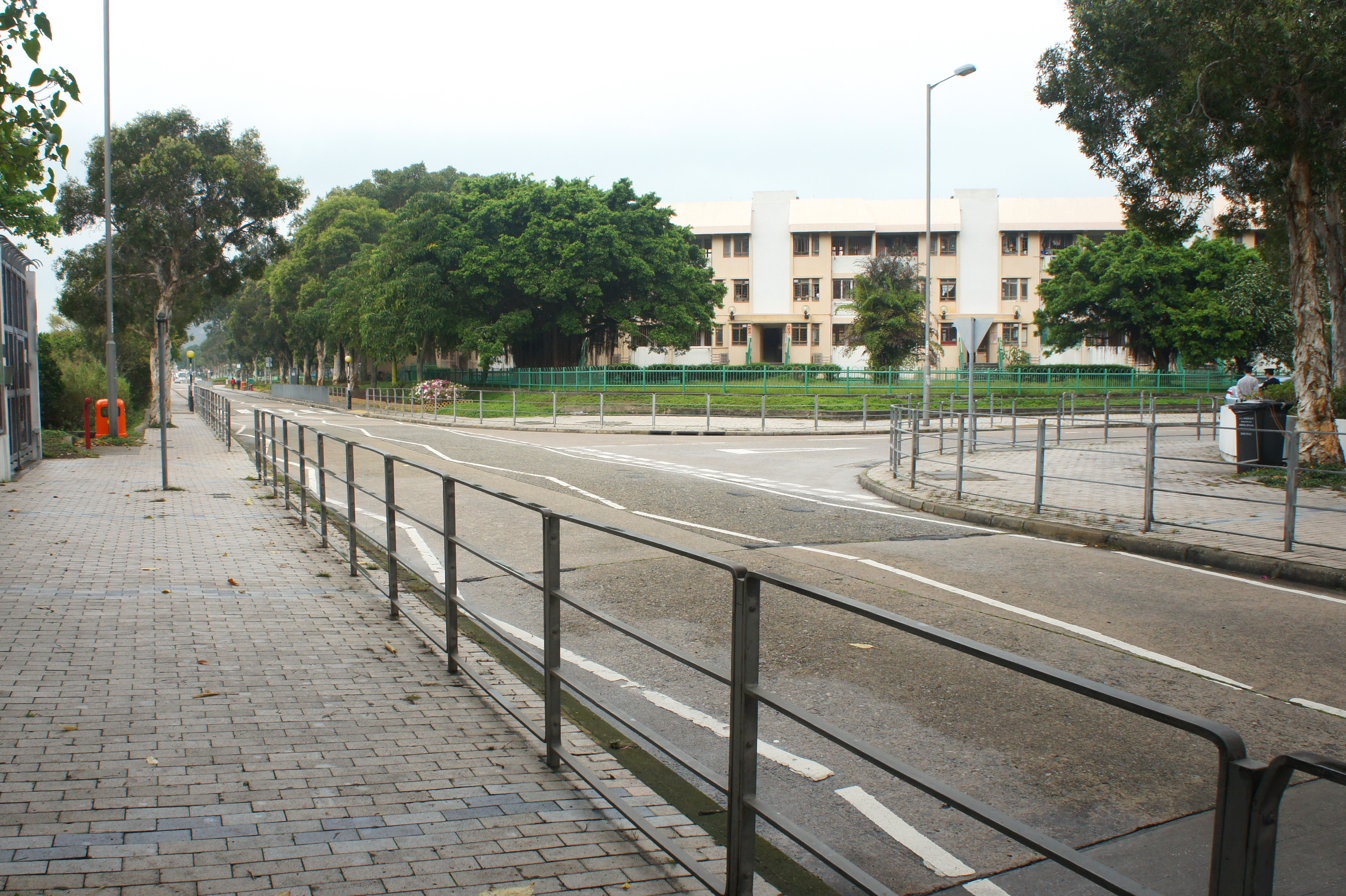
- Looking westward on Tai O Road near Tai O town, 2012
- Native name: 大澳道
- Namesake: Tai O
- Length: 2.7 km (1.7 mi)
- Location: Islands District, Lantau Island, New Territories, Hong Kong
- Coordinates: 22°14′49″N 113°52′22″E
- West end: Tai O Bus Terminus, Tai O
- East end: Keung Shan Road near Kwun Yam Temple, Hang Pui

Construction
- Completion: 29 March 1971
Tai O Road 大澳道
- Traditional Chinese: 大澳道
- Simplified Chinese: 大澳道
Transcriptions
Standard Mandarin
- Hanyu Pinyin: Dà'ào dào
Yue: Cantonese
- Jyutping: daai6 ou3 dou6

Tai O Road (Chinese: 大澳道; pinyin: Dà'ào Dào; Cantonese Yale: daai6 ou3 dou6) is a main road in Islands District, Hong Kong. It is the west-most part of the main roads in south Lantau Island. It starts halfway down the side of Keung Shan, near Kwun Yam Monastery and Hang Pui, and runs downhill to the fishing town of Tai O, the only road access for the town. The road connects to Keung Shan Road and then South Lantau Road towards the rest of Lantau. It is around 2.7 kilometers long.

== History ==
Tai O Road was completed 29 March 1971, providing direct access by road from Mui Wo to Tai O. It continues from Keung Shan Road in the east, which was completed in 1966. This replaced the ferries operated from Yaumatei Ferry Pier, which only had three services each day.

== Access ==
The entirety of Tai O Road is within the Lantau Closed Area, requiring a permit to access by vehicle. Access by road is through Tung Chung Road, South Lantau Road and then Keung Shan Road.

== Facilities ==
Facilities along the road include Tai O Fire Station (No.120), Buddhist Fat Ho Memorial College (No.99)

== Services ==
New Lantao Bus Routes 1, 11, 21, N1 serve Tai O via Tai O Road towards Mui Wo, Tung Chung, Ngong Ping, and Mui Wo (night service) respectively.

== Communities ==
Communities are listed from east to west.

- Keung Shan
- Hang Pui
- Cheung Ting
- Ngau Kwo Tin
- Hang Mei
- Chung Uk
- Yim Tin
- Tai O

== See also ==
- Shek Pik Reservoir
- Shek Pik
- South Lantau Road
- List of roads in Lantau
