= Tung Chung Road =

Road in Lantau Island, Hong Kong, China

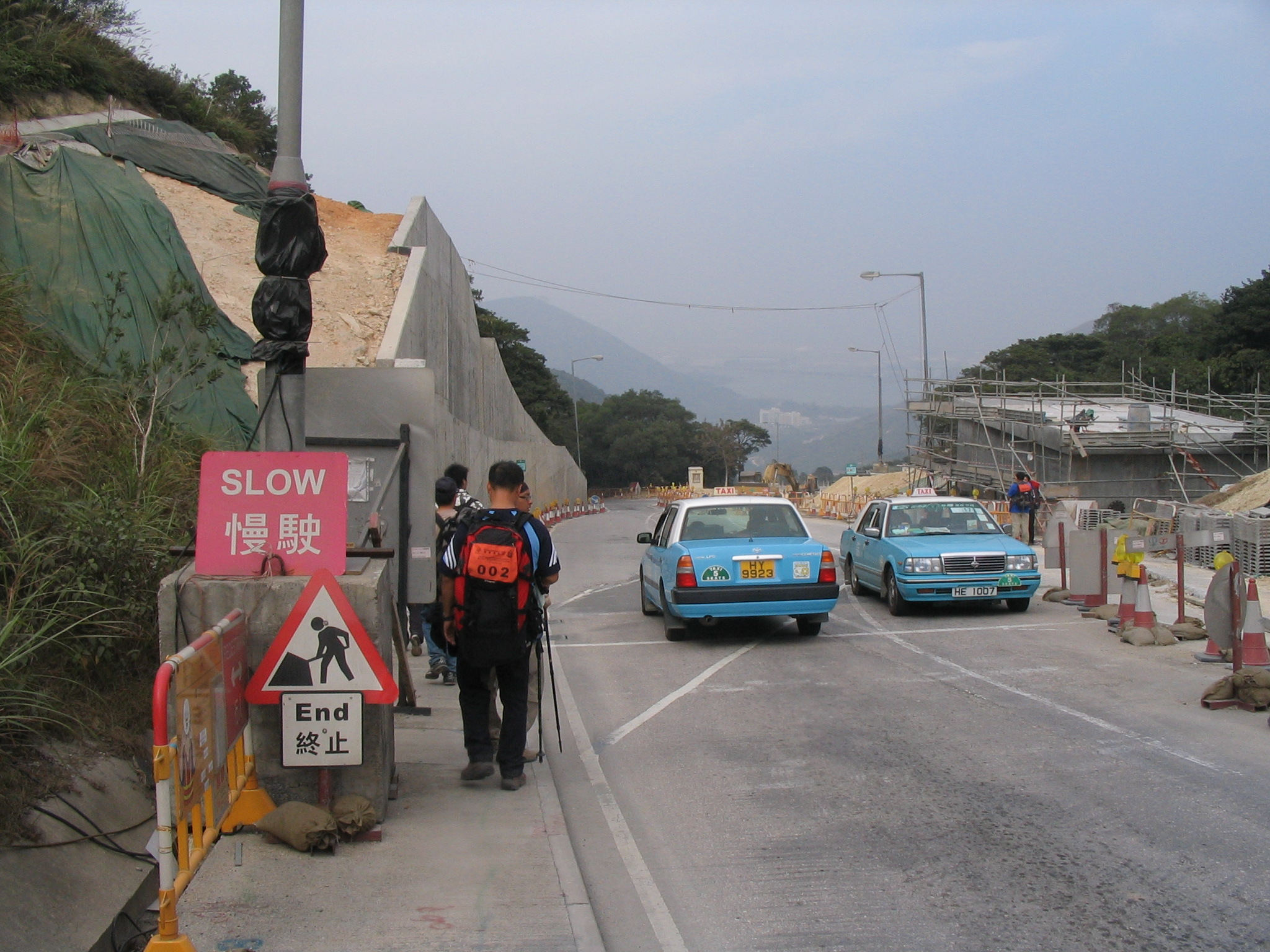
- Tung Chung Road near Pak Kung Au

Route information
- Length: 8.0 km (5.0 mi)
- Restrictions: Access south of Shek Mun Kap require permit

Southern segment
- Length: 7.3 km (4.5 mi)
- South end: South Lantau Road near Cheung Sha
- Major intersections: Shek Mun Kap Road near Fong Yuen
- North end: Cul-de-sac in Tung Chung

Northern segment
- Length: 0.7 km (0.43 mi; 2,300 ft)
- South end: Cul-de-sac in Tung Chung
- North end: Tung Chung Bay

Location
- Country: China
- Special administrative region: Hong Kong

Highway system
- Transport in Hong Kong; Routes; Roads and Streets

Tung Chung Road (traditional Chinese: 東涌道; simplified Chinese: 东涌道; pinyin: Dōngchōng Dào; Cantonese Yale: dung1 chung1 dou6) is a two disjointed-section road connecting the north and south coast of Lantau Island.

== Description ==
The first section is a short road linking a former pier and Wong Nai Uk in Tung Chung. The second is a long and hilly section connecting Tung Chung in the island north to Cheung Sha in the island south. The two sections were previously connected until the completion of the replacement road, Chung Yan Road in Tung Chung New Town.

The short section is featured with historical Tung Chung Battery, a military coastal defence built in Ming dynasty. It runs along the river Ma Wan Chung and ends in Chung Yan Road.

The long section is a long, steep, narrow, winding road. Due to physical constraints, it is open only to buses, taxis, and permit-bearing vehicles with a speed limit of 30 km/h. being too dangerous for double-decker buses to be trafficable and only "single-deckers" are used in the bus services. It starts near Ma Wan New Village and joins Chung Yan Road near a river before proceeding upwards to the valley between Sunset Peak and Lantau Peak. It reaches its highest point at a pass in Pak Kung Au (also known as Tung Chung Au) then follows a steep downhill route. The southern end joins South Lantau Road in Cheung Sha.

Because of its limited capacity, the Transport Department restricts the road only to buses, taxis, and permit holders such as residents and businesses of South Lantau.

The nature of Tung Chung Road helped preserve the rural landscape in southern Lantau. There are bus routes from Tung Chung to various destinations like Cheung Sha, Mui Wo, Shek Pik and Tai O in the island's south. The road splits off the Lantau Trail on the southern slope of the island.

== History ==
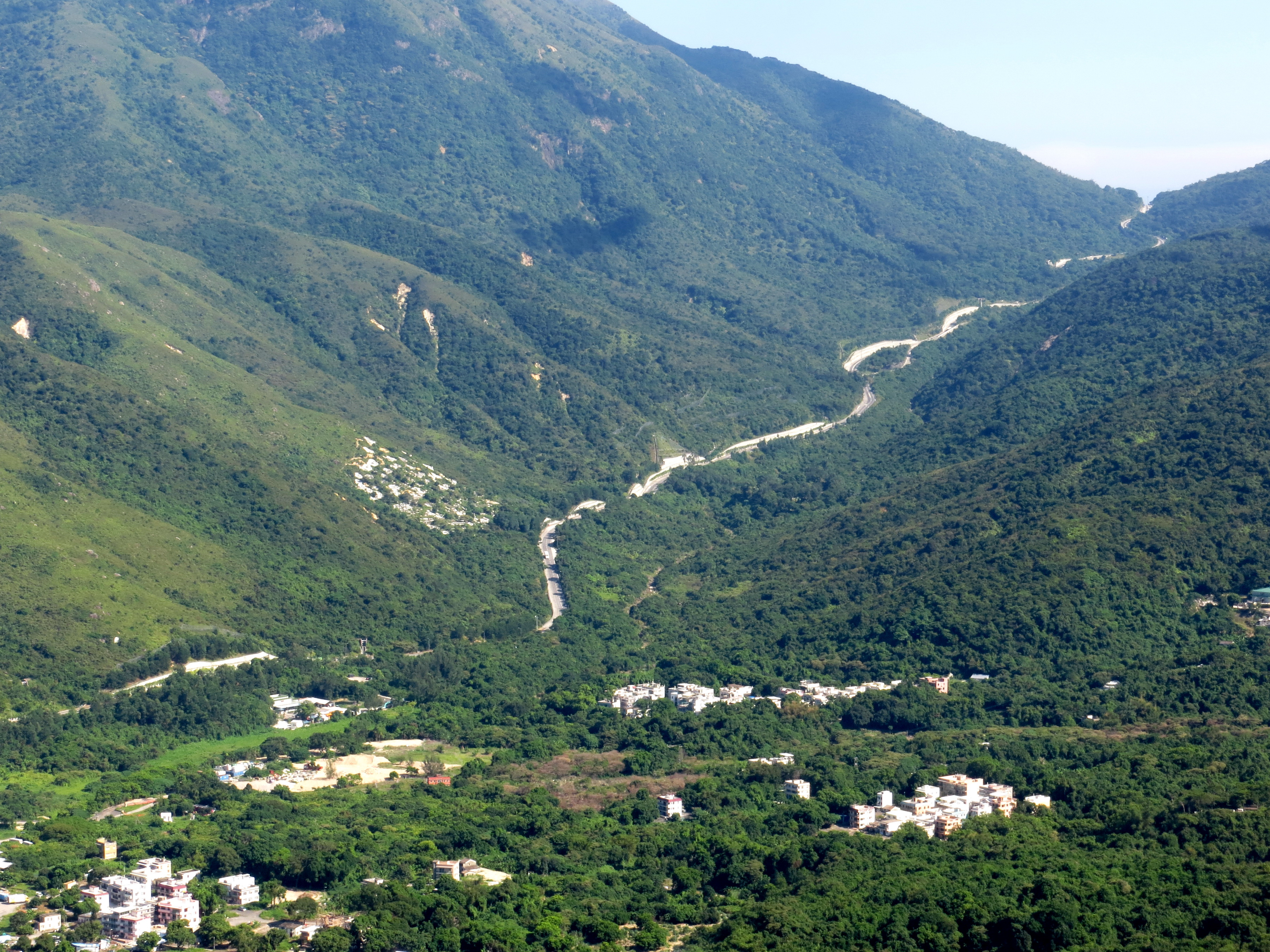
Tung Chung Road and Pak Kung Au, in Tung Chung, Hong Kong. Sunset Peak is on the left and Lantau Peak is on the right.

=== New section ===
Prior to completion of the new section in 2009, numerous parts consisted of a single lane only; when two oncoming vehicles approached, one had to find a passing place to stop and let the other pass.

On 6 February 2009, the improved Tung Chung Road section between Lung Tseng Tau and Cheung Sha near San Shek Wan on Lantau Island was fully opened from 10am. The new road is a dual carriageway wide enough for two vehicles to pass each other and has fewer sharp turns.

Following the opening, the old road section between Pak Kung Au and Cheung Sha near Cheung Sha Bridge has been closed. Vehicles are diverted to the new road section between Pak Kung Au and San Shek Wan.

== Intersections ==
The entire route is in Islands District.

Location	km	mi	Destinations	Notes
	0.0	0.0	South Lantau Road	Roundabout
Pak Kung Au	2.6	1.6	Old Tung Chung Road	
Pak Kung Au	2.8	1.7	Old Tung Chung Road	
	4.0	2.5	Old Tung Chung Road	
	5.4	3.4	Shek Mun Kap Road	
Tung Chung	7.1	4.4	Wong Lung Han Road	
Tung Chung	7.1	4.4	Chung Yan Road	
Tung Chung	7.2	4.5	Pa Mei Road	
Tung Chung	7.3	4.5	Cul-de-sac	
Gap in route
Tung Chung	7.3	4.5	Cul-de-sac	
Tung Chung	7.4	4.6	To Yat Yung Street / Chung Yan Road	
Tung Chung	8.0	5.0	Tung Chung Bay	Cul-de-sac
1.000 mi = 1.609 km; 1.000 km = 0.621 mi: Closed/former

== See also ==
- List of roads in Lantau
- List of streets and roads in Hong Kong
