= Pak Kung Au (disambiguation) =

Pak Kung Au (Chinese: 伯公坳) is an area on Lantau Island in Islands District.

The name may also refer to two other areas in Hong Kong:

- Pak Kung Au (North District), in North District
- Pak Kung Au (Sai Kung District), in Sai Kung District, east of Kowloon Peak
