= Tung Chung Central (constituency) =

Constituency in Hong Kong

- 東涌中
- Elected constituency for the Islands District Council
- Boundary of Tung Chung Central in Islands District
- District: Islands
- Legislative Council constituency: Hong Kong Island West
- Population: 21,366 (2021)
- Electorate: 7,333 (2019)

Current constituency
- Created: 2019
- Number of members: One
- Member: vacant
- Created from: Tung Chung North

Tung Chung Central (Chinese: 東涌中) is one of the 10 constituencies in the Islands District of Hong Kong. The population of Tung Chung Central is 21,366 people.

Created for the 2019 District Council elections, the constituency sends one district councilor to the Islands District Council, with an election every four years.

Tung Chung Central loosely covers area surrounding private residential flats in central Tung Chung.

== Councillors represented ==
| Election | Member | Party |
|---|---|---|
| 2019 | Lee Ka-ho→vacant | Civic→Independent |

== Election results ==
=== 2010s ===
Islands District Council Election, 2019: Tung Chung Central
| Party | Candidate | Votes | % | ±% |
|---|---|---|---|---|
| Civic (PfD) | Lee Ka-ho | 2,708 | 53.44 | |
| NPP | Sammi Fu Hiu-lam | 2,359 | 46.56 | |
| Majority | | 349 | 6.88 | |
| Turnout | | 5,083 | 69.32 | |
| Civic win (new seat) | | | | |
