= Lantau Trail =

Long-distance footpath in Hong Kong

Coordinates: 22.2495°N 113.9280°E

- Length: 67 kilometres (42 miles)
- Location: Hong-Kong
- Use: Hiking
- Elevation gain/loss: 3,059 m (10,036 ft)
- Difficulty: Easy

Map overview

The Lantau Trail (Chinese: 鳳凰徑), opened on 4 December 1984, is a long-distance footpath on Lantau Island in the New Territories of Hong Kong. The 70 kilometres (43 mi) trail is a loop starting and finishing in the rural town of Mui Wo. It is the third longest trail in Hong Kong, after MacLehose Trail and Wilson Trail. The Lantau Trail has good visitor facilities along the way, and the route is well marked. There are information boards and maps at junctions between each stage. Distance posts around 500 metres apart help hikers know where they are. At each turning, route signs give instructions about directions, place names, and the distances and times for hiking between various locations.

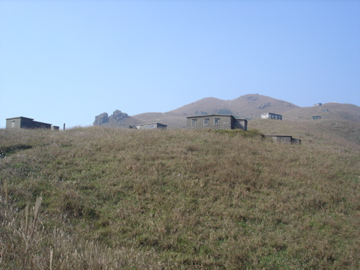
Approach to Sunset Peak.

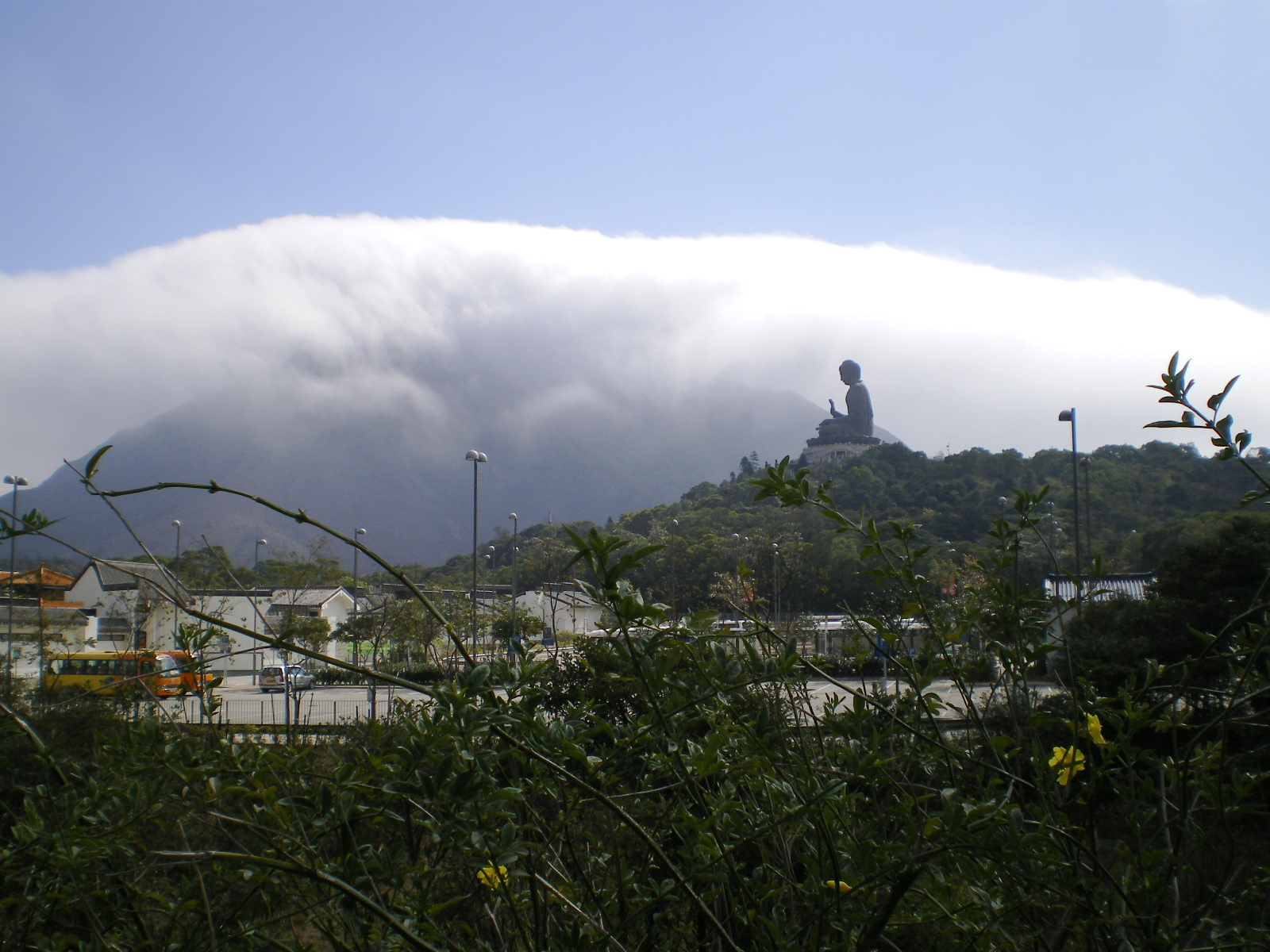
View of The Big Buddha from near the Ngong Ping 360 station.

== Stages ==
The Lantau Trail has 12 stages. There are distance posts along the trail, numbered L000 through L140, every 500m:

Stage	Route	Length (km)	Time (hr)	Difficulty	Starting Post	Ending Post
1	Mui Wo → Nam Shan	2.5	0.75	1/3 stars	L000	L005
2	Nam Shan → Pak Kung Au	6.5	2.75	3/3 stars	L005	L018
3	Pak Kung Au → Ngong Ping 360	4.5	2.75	3/3 stars	L018	L027
4	Ngong Ping 360 → Sham Wat Road^{1}	4.0	1.25	2/3 stars	L027	L035
5	Sham Wat Road → Man Cheung Po	7.5	2.75	2/3 stars	L035	L050
6	Man Cheung Po → Tai O	2.5	1.0	2/3 stars	L050	L055
7	Tai O → Kau Ling Chung	10.5	3.0	3/3 stars	L055	L076
8	Kau Ling Chung → Shek Pik	5.5	1.5	2/3 stars	L076	L087
9	Shek Pik → Shui Hau	6.5	2.0	2/3 stars	L087	L100
10	Shui Hau → Tung Chung Road	6.5	2.0	1/3 stars	L100	L113
11	Tung Chung Road → Pui O	4.5	1.25	1/3 stars	L113	L122
12	Pui O → Mui Wo	9.0	3.0	2/3 stars	L122	L140

Easy Walk
Fairly Difficult
Very Difficult

^{1} Path is rerouted. The Section 3/4 changeover appears now to occur very close to the Ngong Ping 360 cable lift. Section 4 for the most part follows Ngong Ping Road from Ngong Ping 360 to the start of Section 5. As of April 2019, Google Maps has the correct route in its database.

== Trail rerouting at Ngong Ping (Sections 3 and 4) ==
The current routing leaves it unclear if the Section 3/4 changeover is near distance post L027 or distance post L030. The previous changeover was at L027. For easiest access to/from Ngong Ping and Ngong Ping 360, follow the trail to distance post L030. Once at the cable car station, follow the pedestrian shopping precinct in the direction of the Tian Tan Buddha for around 200m, watching on the right for a poorly displayed Lantau Trail sign pointing hikers downhill along Ngong Ping Road and Sham Wat Road. Section 4 continues on the road all the way to Section 5.

== Trail closing at Yi O (Section 7) and related controversy ==
The trail crosses private land at Yi O Village and access is officially closed (as verified in December 2013).

Along the trail is posted the following message:

Farmland rehabilitation within private lots in Yi O Kau Tsuen and Yi O San Tsuen is in progress. The land owners do not allow unauthorised access to those villages. The affected sections of Lantau Trail Section 7 passing through those villages will be diverted. Visitors who wish to go to Fan Lau or Kau Liu Chung are advised to choose alternative route as shown on the map below.

The closing applies approximately to the part of Section 7 between distance posts 062 and 065 only, but the alternative route skips a length of trail starting from around distance post 059 and ending around distance post 073. Portions of the alternative route are available on Google maps as of April 2019. The intermediate distance posts in the closed section appear to have been removed. There is currently no sign indicating when (or if) the original part of Section 7 will be restored.

One can find the approximate original route by turning left at the end of the paved path, following the trail/dirt road, and then staying to the left of the organic produce farm. However, use of this route, as a separate sign indicates, will be considered trespassing—those who choose to find the original route should be mindful about causing disruptions. The suggested alternative route leaves the Lantau Trail right after distance post 059 (and immediately before Na Ying Kok campsite) and rejoins the trail near distance post 073. Substantial clearing work for an organic farm has occurred since 2010, so finding the trail may be difficult.,

The trail closing has, as of December 2013, generated considerable political controversy. The developer of the 9-hectare organic farm, Andrew Lam Siu-lo, is being investigated for having cleared ecologically sensitive land by burning and for having brought heavy construction machinery into a protected Hong Kong country park. The Yi O village area has protected wetland area and is one of the few habitats of Hong Kong's endemic and rare Romer's tree frog. Lam was a top advisor to Hong Kong Chief Executive CY Leung's 2012 campaign. Rerouting of the trail appears to have been unnecessary and one might reasonably point to Mr. Lam's motivation in attempting to keep the public away from Yi O. Other than some recent development, Yi O appears to be an all but abandoned village, having lost its population long ago, and therefore restrictions against "trespassing" on village property might only make sense in the context of Mr. Lam's development project.

The original trail is open to pedestrian traffic as of October 2024.

== Phoenix Walkathon ==
The Phoenix Walkathon was previously held by the Hong Kong Ecotoursism Society along the 70-km Lantau Trail every year, although it was cancelled in the early 2000s.

== See also ==
- The Big Buddha (Hong Kong)
- List of long-distance footpaths in Hong Kong
