= Mun Yat (constituency) =

Former Hong Kong District Council constituency

- Former Elected constituency for the Islands District Council
- Boundary of Mun Yat in Islands District
- District: Islands
- Legislative Council constituency: Hong Kong Island West
- Population: 23,475 (2019)
- Electorate: 13,227 (2019)

Former constituency
- Created: 2007
- Abolished: 2023
- Number of members: One
- Member: Kwok Ping (Independent)

Mun Yat (Chinese: 滿逸), previously Yat Tung Estate South, was one of the 10 constituencies in the Islands District in Hong Kong.

From 2007 to 2023, the constituency was represented by one district councillor in the Islands District Council. The constituency was abolished in the 2023 electoral changes and now forms part of the Islands constituency, which covers the entire Islands District and returns two members to the council.

Loosely covering Mun Tung Estate and Yat Tung (I) Estate in Tung Chung, Mun Yat constituency has an estimated population of 23,475.

== Councillors represented ==
Election	Member	Party
2007	Andy Lo Kwong-shing	DAB
2015	Eric Kwok Ping	Democratic
2017	Eric Kwok Ping	Independent

== Election results ==
=== 2010s ===
Islands District Council Election, 2019: Mun Yat
Party	Candidate	Votes	%	±%
Independent	Eric Kwok Ping	5,997	67.62	
FTU (DAB)	Wong Chun-kit	2,872	32.38	
Majority		3,125	35.24	
Turnout		8,893	67.28	
Independent hold		Swing		
