= Shek Pik San Tsuen =

Village of Hong Kong

Coordinates: 22.36792°N 114.11653°E

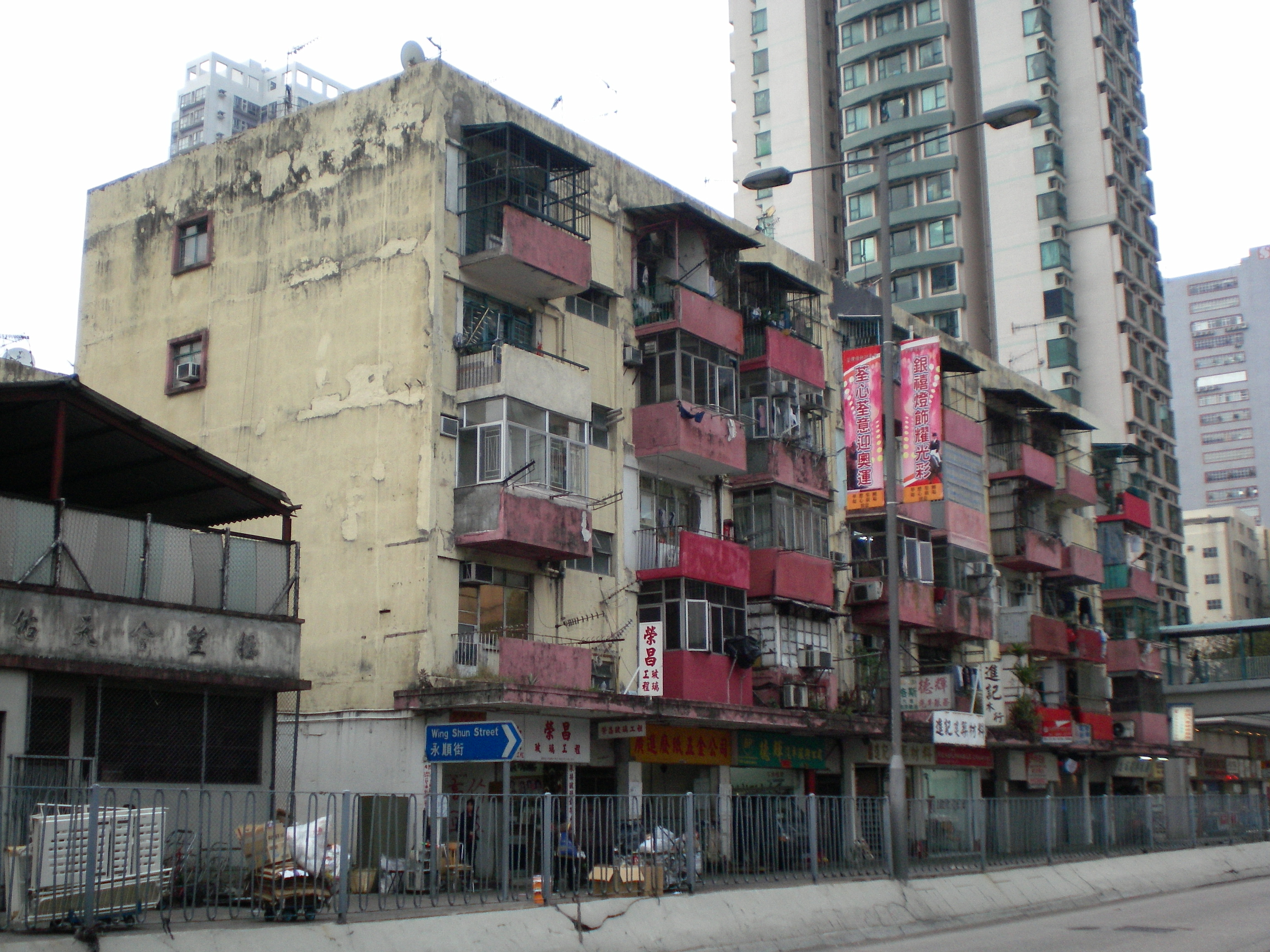
Shek Pik new Village in Tsuen Wan.

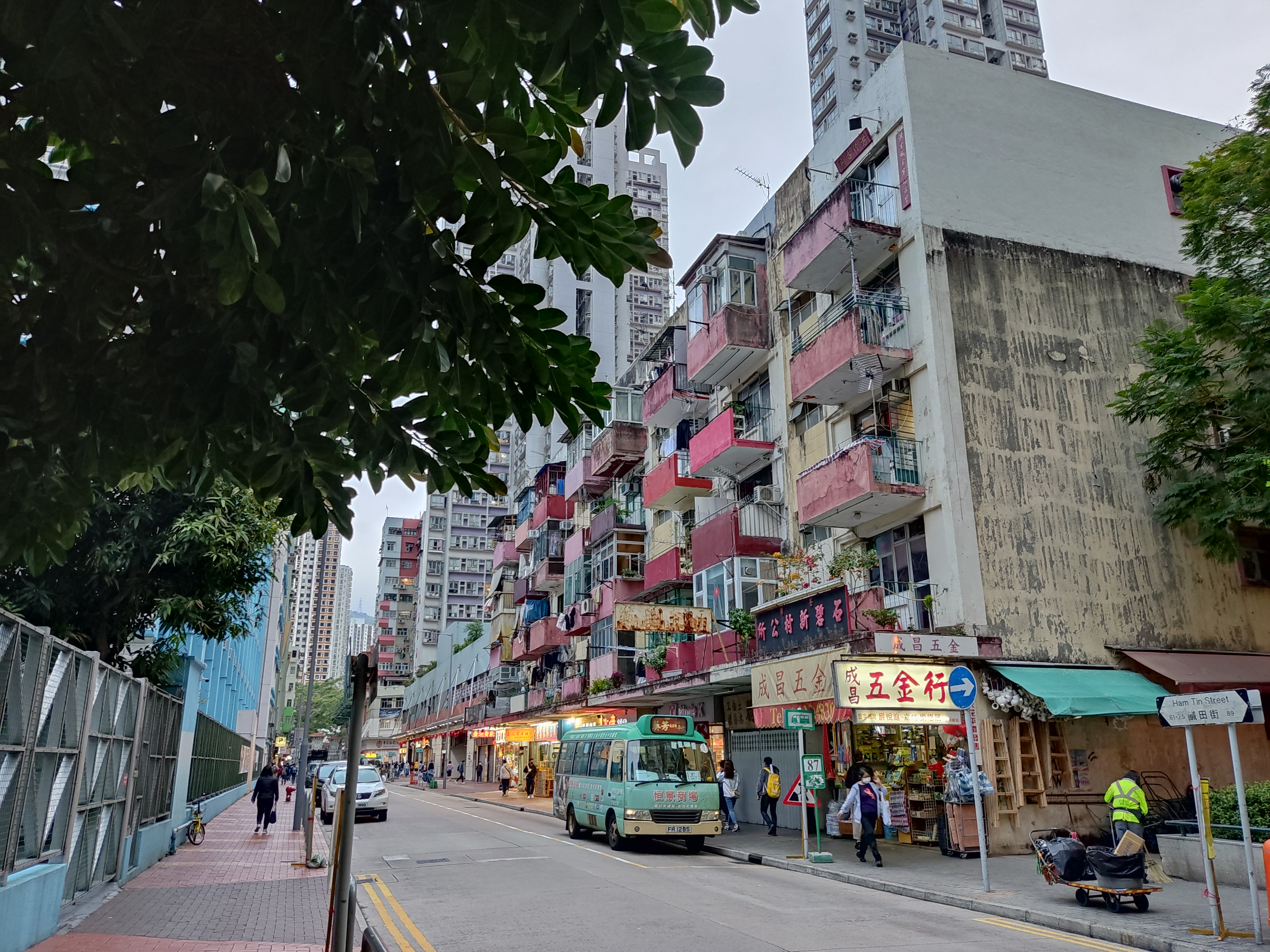
Shek Pik new Village.

Shek Pik San Tsuen or Shek Pik New Village (Chinese: 石碧新村) a.k.a. Shek Pik Resettlement is an urban village in Tsuen Wan District, Hong Kong.

== History ==
The villages of Shek Pik Valley - Shek Pik, Fan Pui, Kong Pui (崗貝) and the hamlet of Hang Tsai (坑仔) - were demolished and cleared to allow construction of the Shek Pik Reservoir. A total of about 260 people were resettled as a consequence. Most of the villagers of Shek Pik Village moved into five-story apartment blocks in the urban Shek Pik New Village in Tsuen Wan. Most of the villagers of Fan Pui moved to a new village nearby, Tai Long Wan Tsuen (大浪灣村) at Tai Long Wan, Shek Pik. Some families from both villages moved to a row of houses near Mui Wo Ferry Pier.

== Administration ==
Shek Pik San Tsuen is a recognized village under the New Territories Small House Policy.
