= Buddhist Fat Ho Memorial College =

Coordinates: 22.25190°N 113.8663°E

- 佛教筏可紀念中學
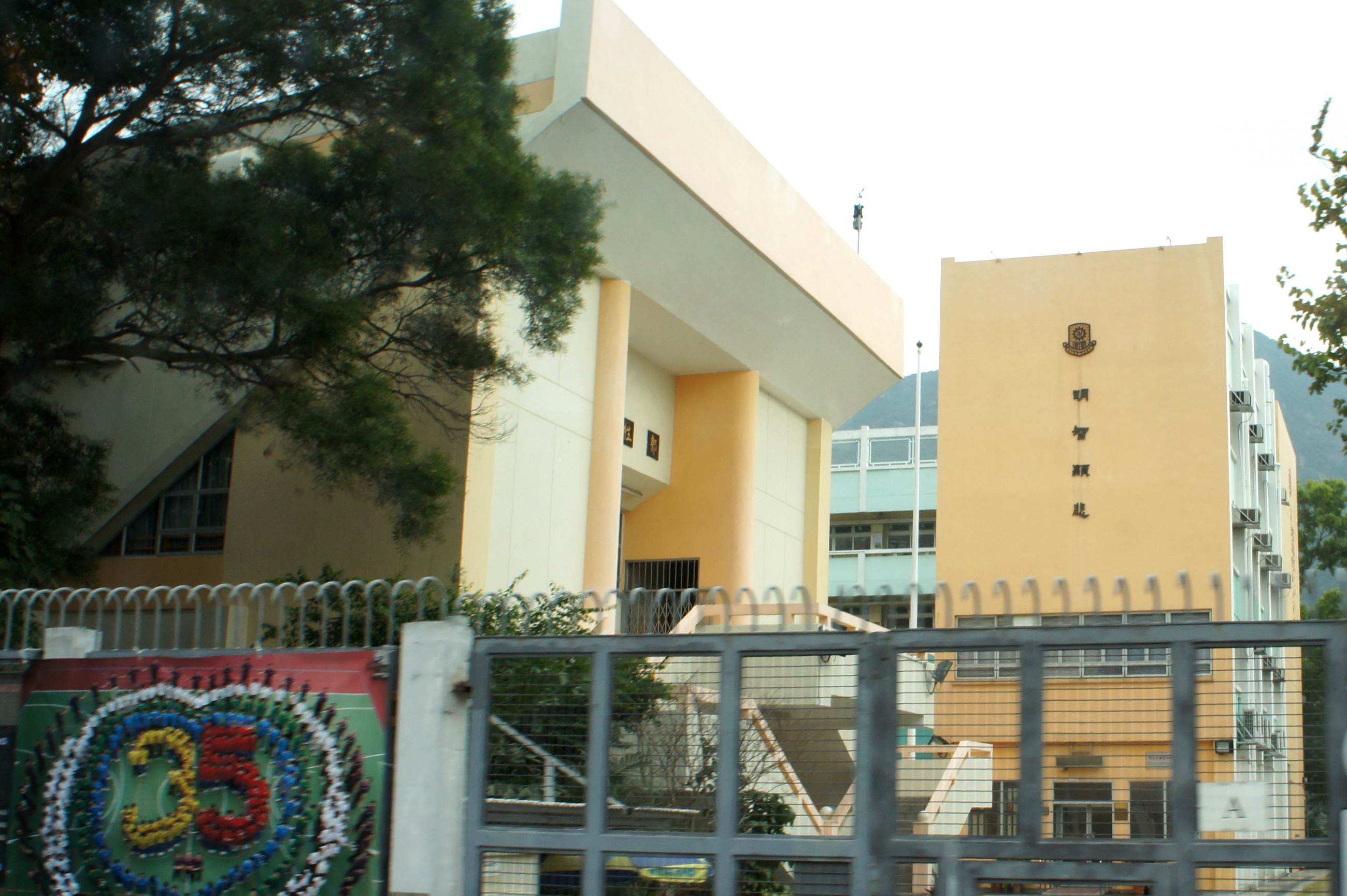
- Buddhist Fat Ho Memorial College, 99 Tai O Road, Tai O, Hong Kong

Buddhist Fat Ho Memorial College
- Traditional Chinese: 佛教筏可紀念中學
- Simplified Chinese: 佛教筏可纪念中学
Transcriptions
Standard Mandarin
- Hanyu Pinyin: Fójiào Fá Kě Jìniàn Zhōngxué
Yue: Cantonese
- Yale Romanization: Fāt gāau faht hó géi nihm jūng hohk
- Jyutping: Fat1 gaau1 fat6 ho2 gei2 nim6 zung1 hok6

Buddhist Fat Ho Memorial College is a co-educational secondary school in Hong Kong. The school opened in 1977 and as of 2016 had approximately 350 students. It is run by the Hong Kong Buddhist Association and sponsored by Po Lin Monastery. It is a Direct Subsidy Scheme institution that charges tuition fees. Students can pick between English or Cantonese as their medium of instruction. Situated in Tai O, it is the first co-ed secondary school on Lantau Island.

Around 2009 the school had annual losses of $5 million HKD with 280 students. In hopes of "reduc[ing] annual losses" the school became a Direct Subsidy Scheme (DSS) school. According to Elaine Yau of the South China Morning Post, financial performance improved subsequently during the principalship of Eric Yuon Fuk-lung, thanks in part to significant staffing cuts.

Buddhist Fat Ho Memorial College's motto is "Enlighten with Wisdom, Manifest with Compassion and Pursue kindness and virtue". The school is founded on the Buddhist value that everyone has an equal right to learn.

== Student body ==
Elaine Yau wrote in 2015 that "a number of students come from troubled families or have a chequered past". In 2021 a student was a finalist for South China Morning Post's and the Hong Kong Jockey Club's Hong Kong Student of the Year Award.

== Facilities ==
Po Lin Monastery has a boarding house with spaces for thirty students.
