= Yat Tung Estate North (constituency) =

One of 10 Islands District constituencies in Hong Kong

- Elected constituency for the Islands District Council
- Boundary of Yat Tung Estate North in Islands District
- District: Islands
- Legislative Council constituency: Hong Kong Island West
- Population: 24,772 (2019)
- Electorate: 13,599 (2019)

Current constituency
- Created: 2007
- Number of members: One
- Member: Fong Lung-fei (Independent)
- Created from: Yat Tung

Yat Tung Estate North is one of the 10 constituencies in the Islands District in Hong Kong. The constituency returns one district councillor to the Islands District Council, with an election every four years.

Yat Tung Estate North constituency is loosely based on northern part of the Yat Tung Estate in Tung Chung with an estimated population of 24,772.

== Councillors represented ==
Election	Member	Party
2007	Tang Ka-piu	FTU
2019	Fong Lung-fei	Independent democrat

== Election results ==
=== 2010s ===
Islands District Council Election, 2019: Yat Tung Estate North
Party	Candidate	Votes	%	±%
PfD	Fong Lung-fei	5,376	61.80	
FTU (DAB)	Lau Chin-pang	3,323	38.20	−39.10
Majority		2,053	23.60	
Turnout		8,736	64.29	
PfD hold		Swing		

Islands District Council Election, 2015: Yat Tung Estate North
Party	Candidate	Votes	%	±%
FTU	Tang Ka-piu	3,061	77.3	+15.9
Nonpartisan	Jimmy Leung Hon-wai	900	22.7	
Majority		2,161	54.6	
Turnout		4,003	46.3	
FTU hold		Swing		

Islands District Council Election, 2011: Yat Tung Estate North
Party	Candidate	Votes	%	±%
FTU	Tang Ka-piu	2,691	61.4	+8.0
Democratic	Kwok Ping	1,693	38.6	−8.0
FTU hold		Swing		

=== 2000s ===
Islands District Council Election, 2007: Yat Tung Estate North
Party	Candidate	Votes	%	±%
FTU	Tang Ka-piu	1,510	53.4	
Democratic	Kwok Ping	1,317	46.6	
FTU win (new seat)				
