= Pui O =

Area of Hong Kong

Coordinates: 22°14′23.46″N 113°58′36.03″E

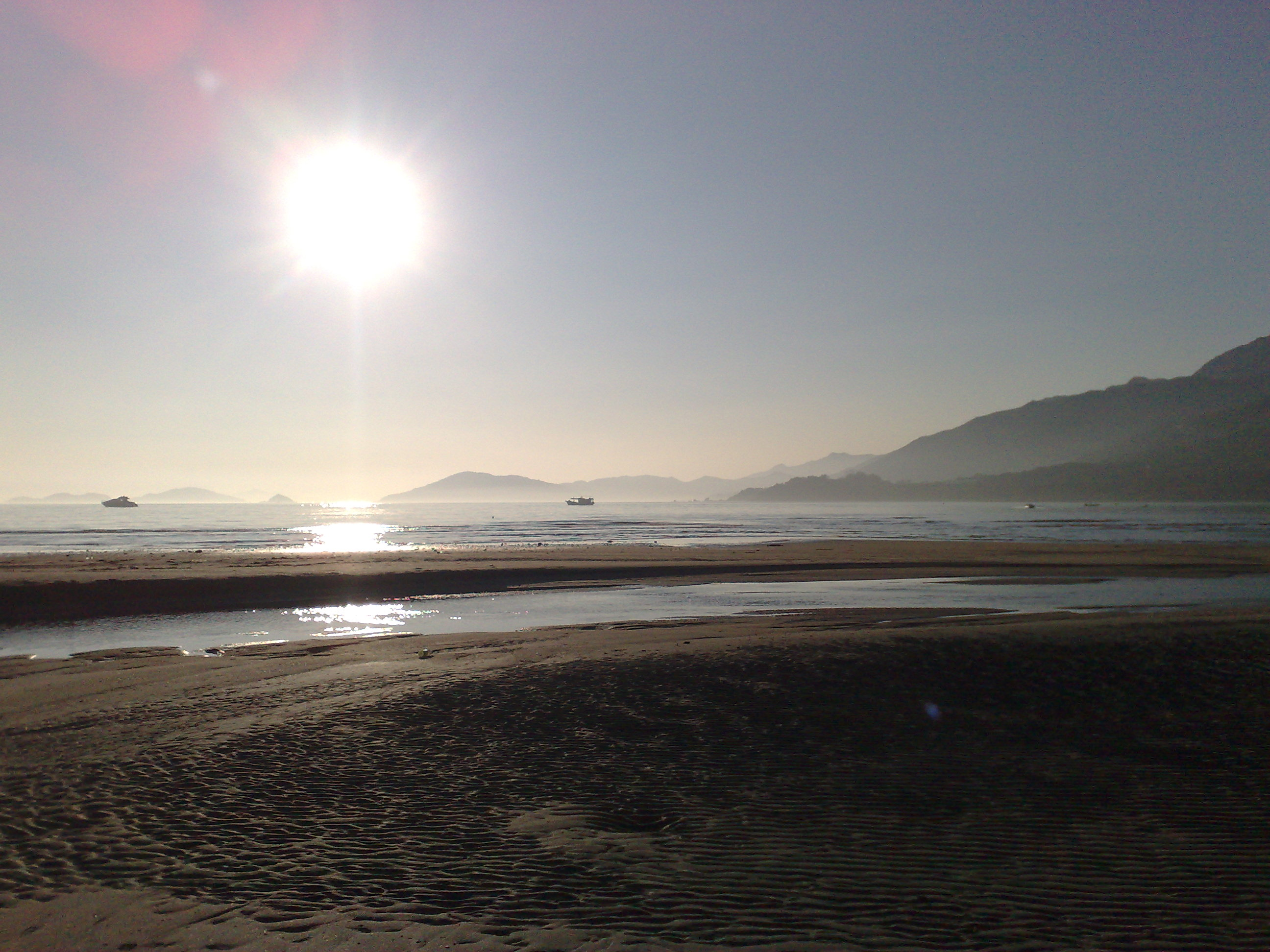
Pui O Beach, Lantau Island.

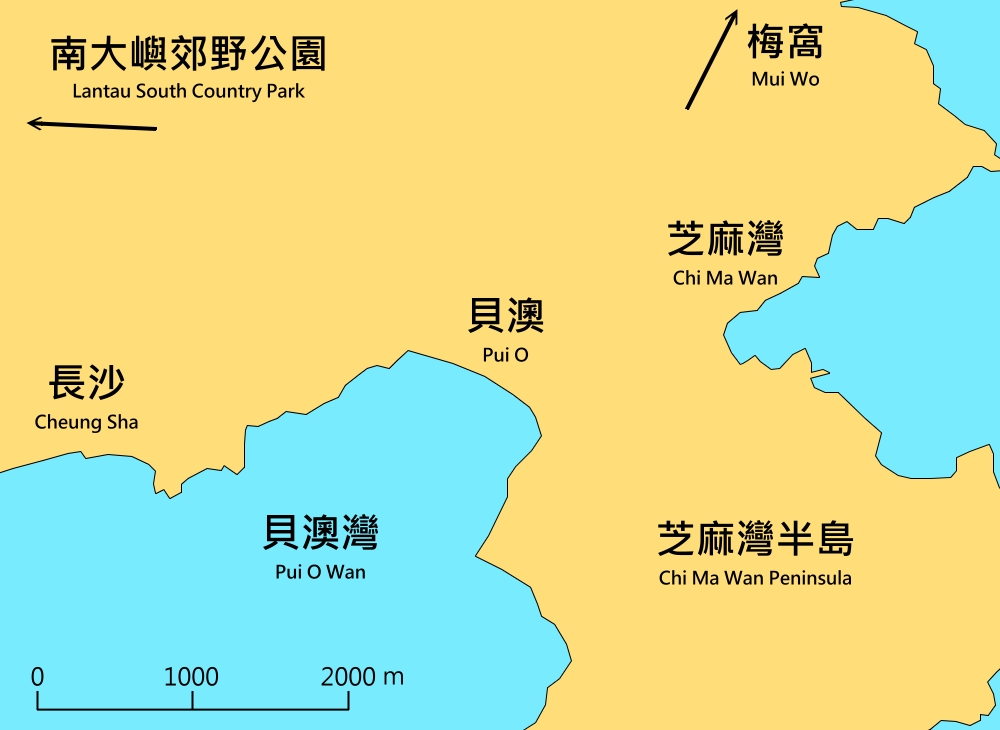
Map showing location of Pui O

Pui O (Chinese: 貝澳, or 杯澳), formerly Lo Pui O (螺杯澳), is an area on Lantau Island in Hong Kong. It is a popular destination for holiday camping in Hong Kong. Visitors may also rent village houses for leisure. Located in the South Lantau, there are four main villages in Pui O, they are Lo Wai (老圍), San Wai (新圍), Lo Uk (羅屋), and Ham Tin (鹹田). Pui O is located at the edge of Lantau South Country Park.

== Administration ==
Lo Wai, San Wai, Lo Uk and Ham Tin are recognized villages under the New Territories Small House Policy.

== Geography ==
Pui O is a bay shaped by the Chi Ma Wan Peninsula and the lower slopes of Sunset Peak. A main river from a valley to the east and other small river gather at Pui O forming an estuary of wetland. Villagers enclosed the wetland and converted it into rice paddies. This is indicated by the name Ham Tin (鹹田; 'salty paddy field'). At the shore, a long beach (or spit) is formed by the interaction between the current of the South China Sea and the rivers.

== Pui O Beach ==
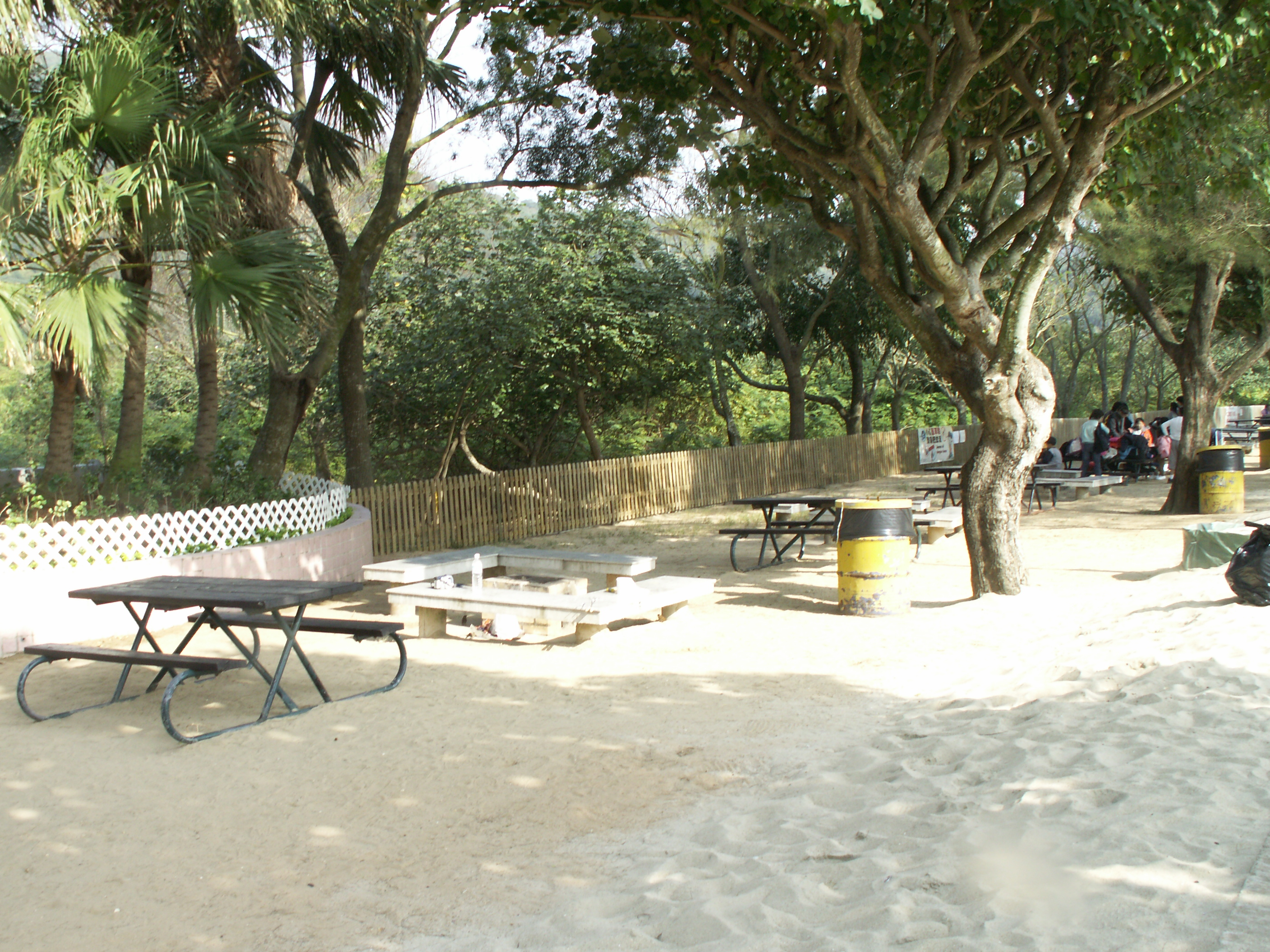
Barbecue area at Pui O.

Pui O Beach (貝澳泳灘) runs along almost the entire shoreline of Pui O. Due to the geological composition of surrounding area, the sand on the beach is mixture of black and yellow. The Hong Kong Government has constructed facilities on the upper beach for wild camping.

== History ==
Lo Pui O is one of five villages of Lantau that were resettled when the coastal restriction of the Great Clearance was lifted in 1669. The other villages are Tung Sai Chung, Tai O, Shek Pik and Mui Wo.

During the Qing dynasty, villages near the shore in Hong Kong were frequently attacked by pirates. Villages in Pui O were constructed as walled villages to assist in repelling these attacks, and several of the Lantau villages, though getting a living from the sea, were by design located at some distance from it.

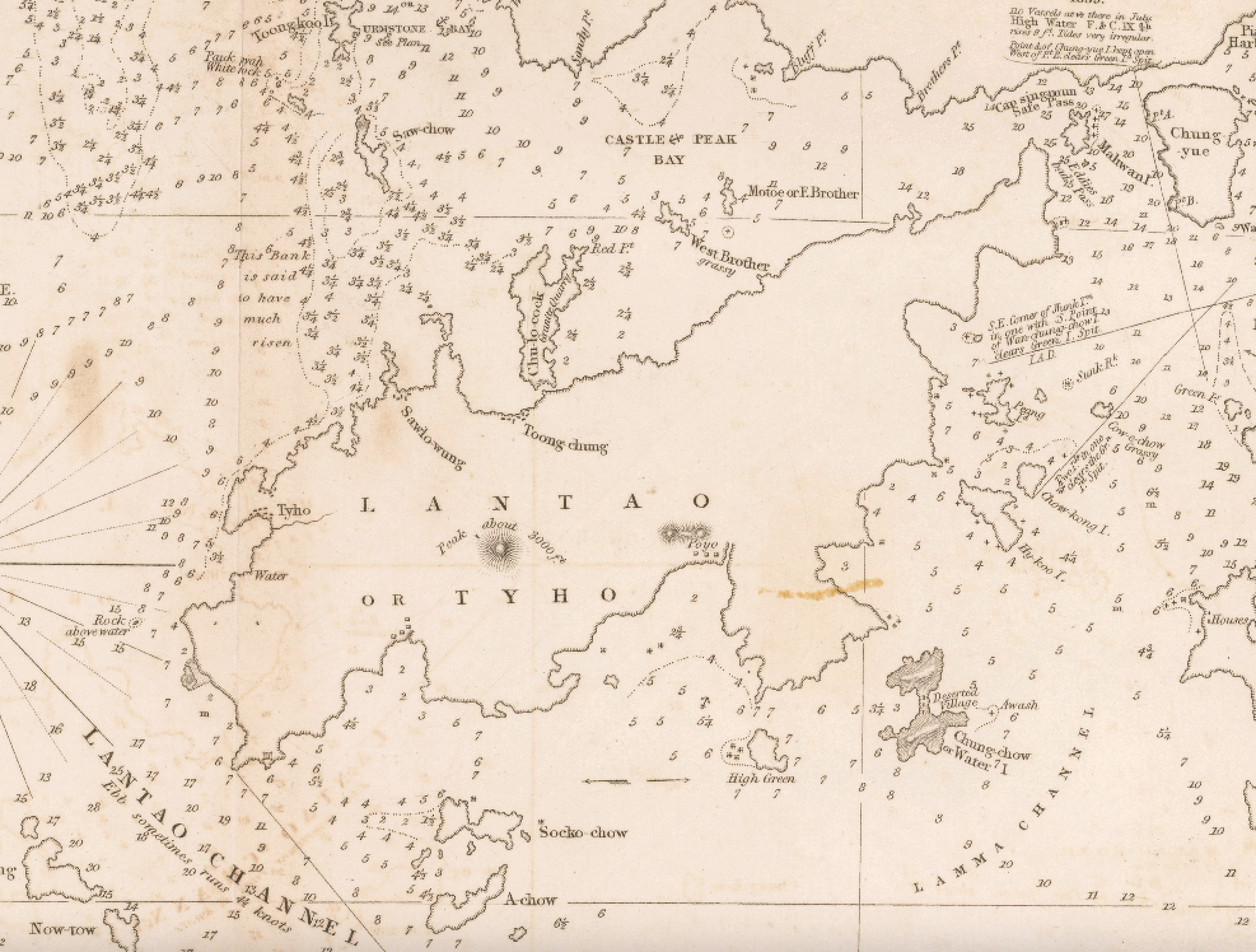
Lantau Island as surveyed by a British fleet in 1815. Pui O can be seen in the center.

Tung Chung was already seen on Western maps beginning in 1815, sometimes with the romanization Poyo (see image).

== Historical buildings ==
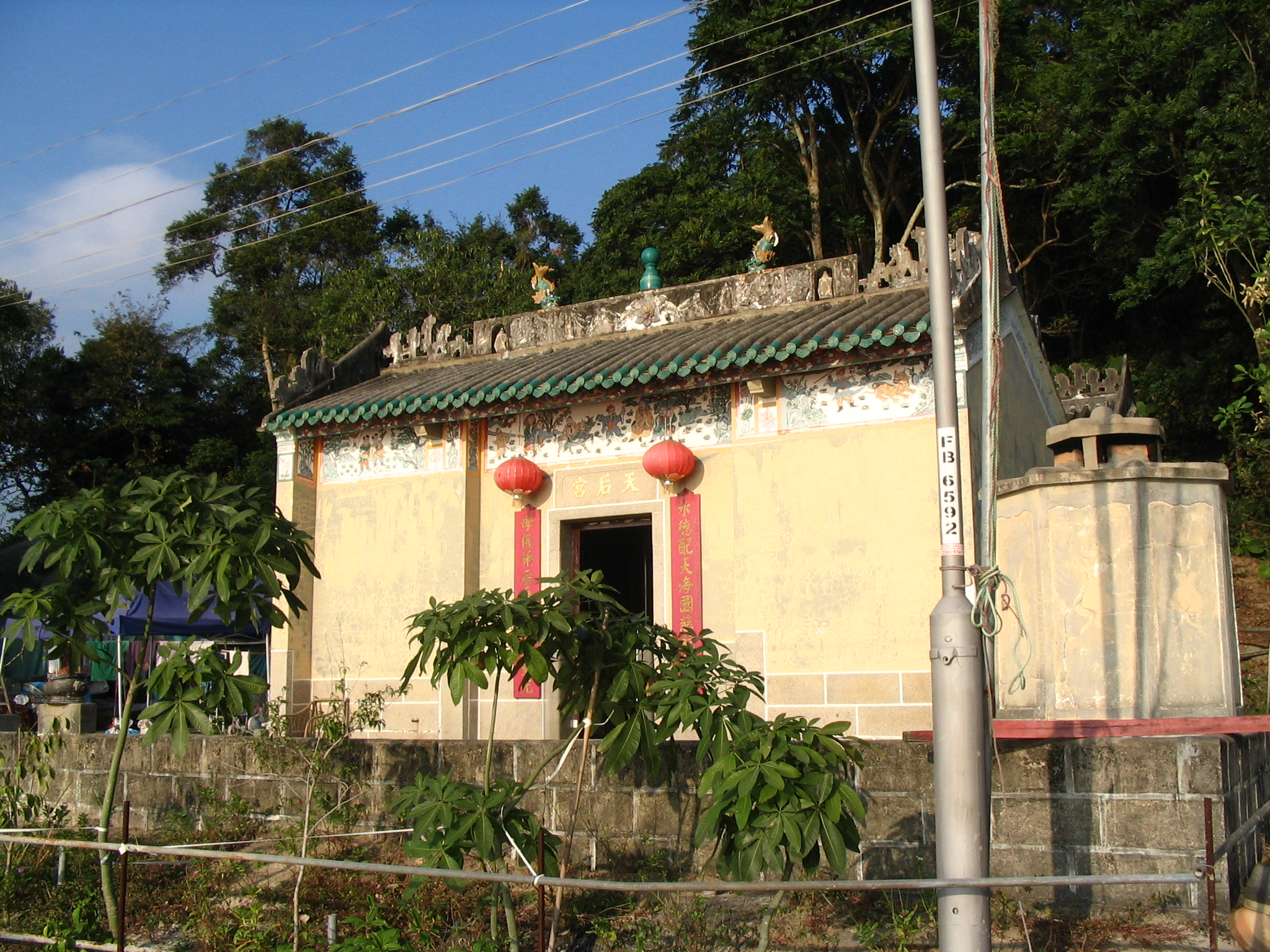
Tin Hau Temple in Ham Tin, Pui O.

29 historical buildings and features of Pui O are listed by the Antiquities and Monuments Office.

In Ham Tin, at Chung Hau (涌口; 'the river mouth') there is a Tin Hau Temple. It was built in the Ming dynasty, rebuilt in 1798 and repaired in 1947, 1974 and 1995. It is surrounded by two feng shui trees, and an earth god shrine is located at its right side.

Other historical buildings include:

- Lin Kong Tong in Ham Tin, probably built in the late Qing Dynasty, it serves the dual-purpose of ancestral hall and meeting place to the elder branch of the Cheungs who settled in the village in the early 19th century.
- Cheung Ancestral Hall, also known as Yue Tak Tong, in Lo Wai, probably built in the late Qing Dynasty.
- Wing On Bridge and its associated earth god shrine in Ham Tin.
- An archaeological site was discovered in Pui O in 1957.

== Education ==
Most of Lantau Island, Pui O included, is in Primary One Admission (POA) School Net 98, which contains multiple aided schools on Lantau Island, including two in Tung Chung; no government primary schools are in this net.

== Flora and fauna ==
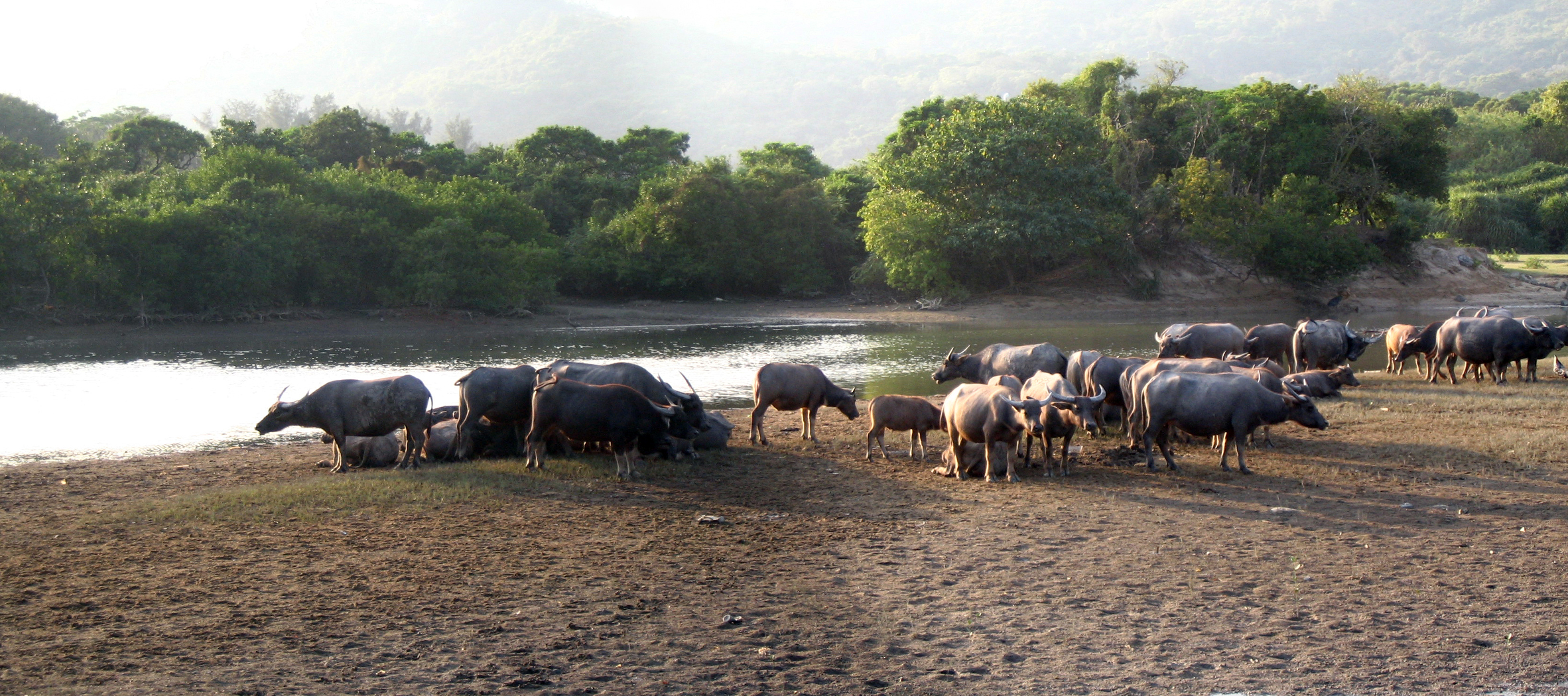
Water Buffaloes in Pui O

Mangrove can be found on both sides of the estuary between Ham Tin and Pui O beach.

A resident population of water buffaloes can be found in Pui O. It is one of the few remaining areas where they still occur in Hong Kong.

== Nature ==
The Lantau Trail passes through Pui O, and there are many other hiking routes in the vicinity. There are also several Mountain Bike tracks which are located on the Chi Ma Wan peninsula, and are connected to many other tracks around the Island.

== Transport ==
Pui O is on the South Lantau Road. All bus routes between Mui Wo and other points pass through Pui O, with the New Lantao Bus running their route numbers 1, 2, 3M, 4 stopping at the Pui O Petrol Station, San Wai Tsuen and Lo Uk Tsuen. A branch road, Chi Ma Wan Road routes across Chi Ma Wan Peninsula to Chi Ma Wan.
