= Pak Kung Au =

Coordinates: 22°14′54″N 113°56′34″E

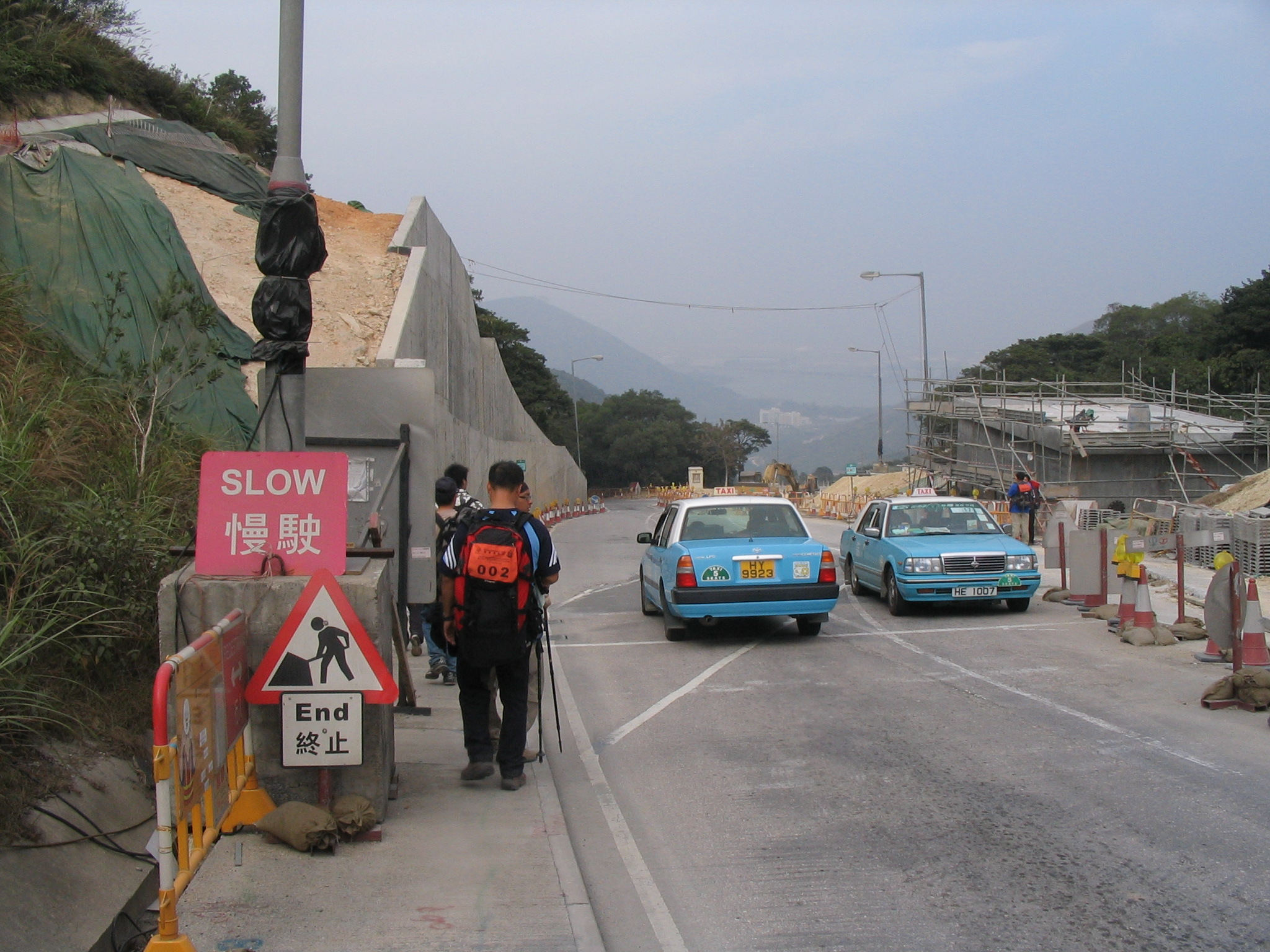
Tung Chung Road near Pak Kung Au in 2007.

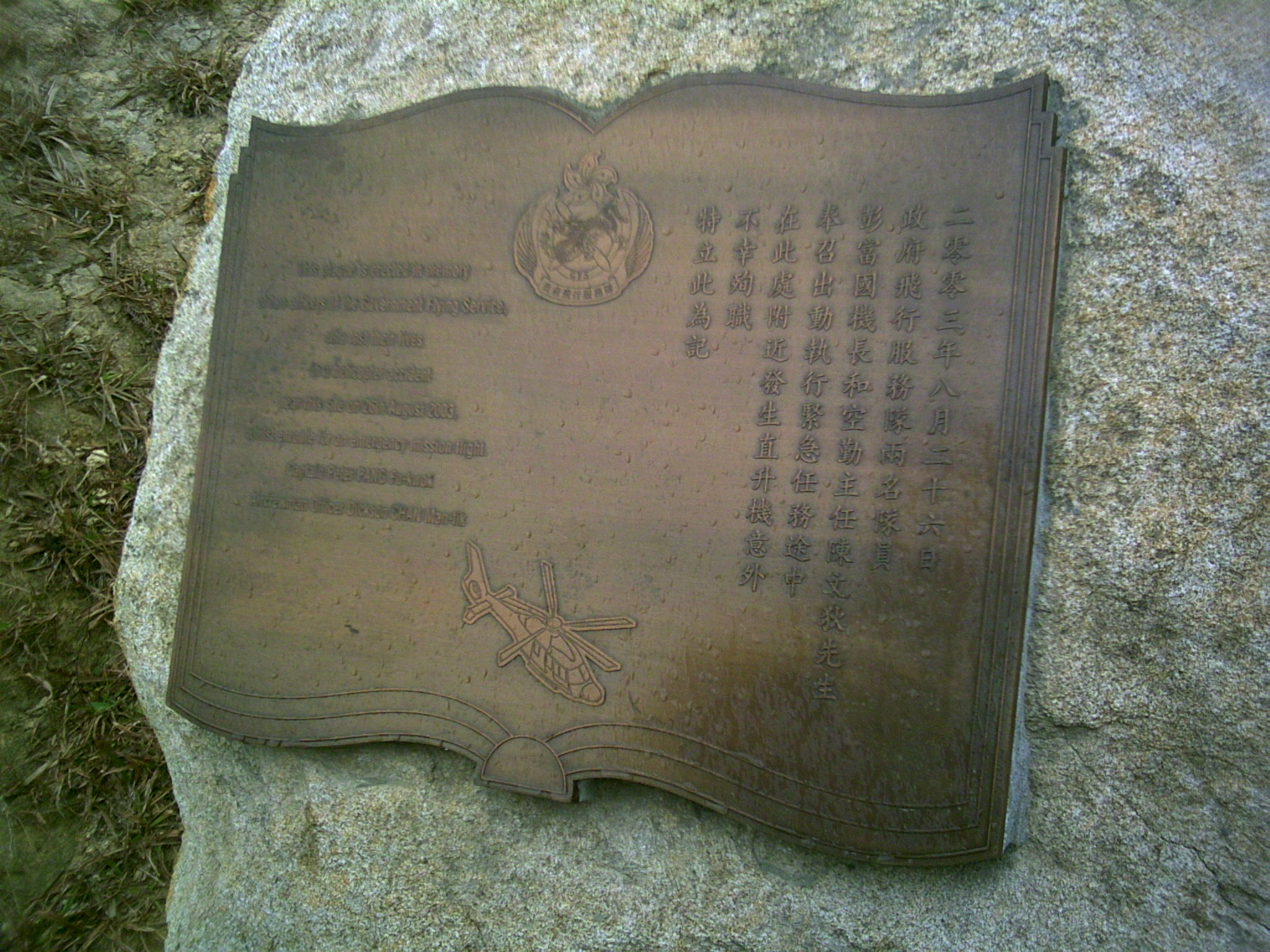
Plaque in memory of the B-HRX crash.

Pak Kung Au (Chinese: 伯公坳), also known as Tung Chung Gap, Tung Chung Au (東涌坳), is a mountain pass along Tung Chung Road on Lantau Island, Hong Kong.

It is located at the end of Stage 2 and the start of Stage 3 of the Lantau Trail, between Sunset Peak and Lantau Peak.

== B-HRX crash ==
On 26 August 2003, the B-HRX, an EC 155 B1 helicopter from the Government Flying Service crashed at Pak Kung Au. The pilot and the aircrewman were fatally injured. They are buried in Gallant Garden, a cemetery for civil servants who die on duty.
