= New Lantao Bus =

Franchised bus company in Hong Kong

New Lantao Bus Company

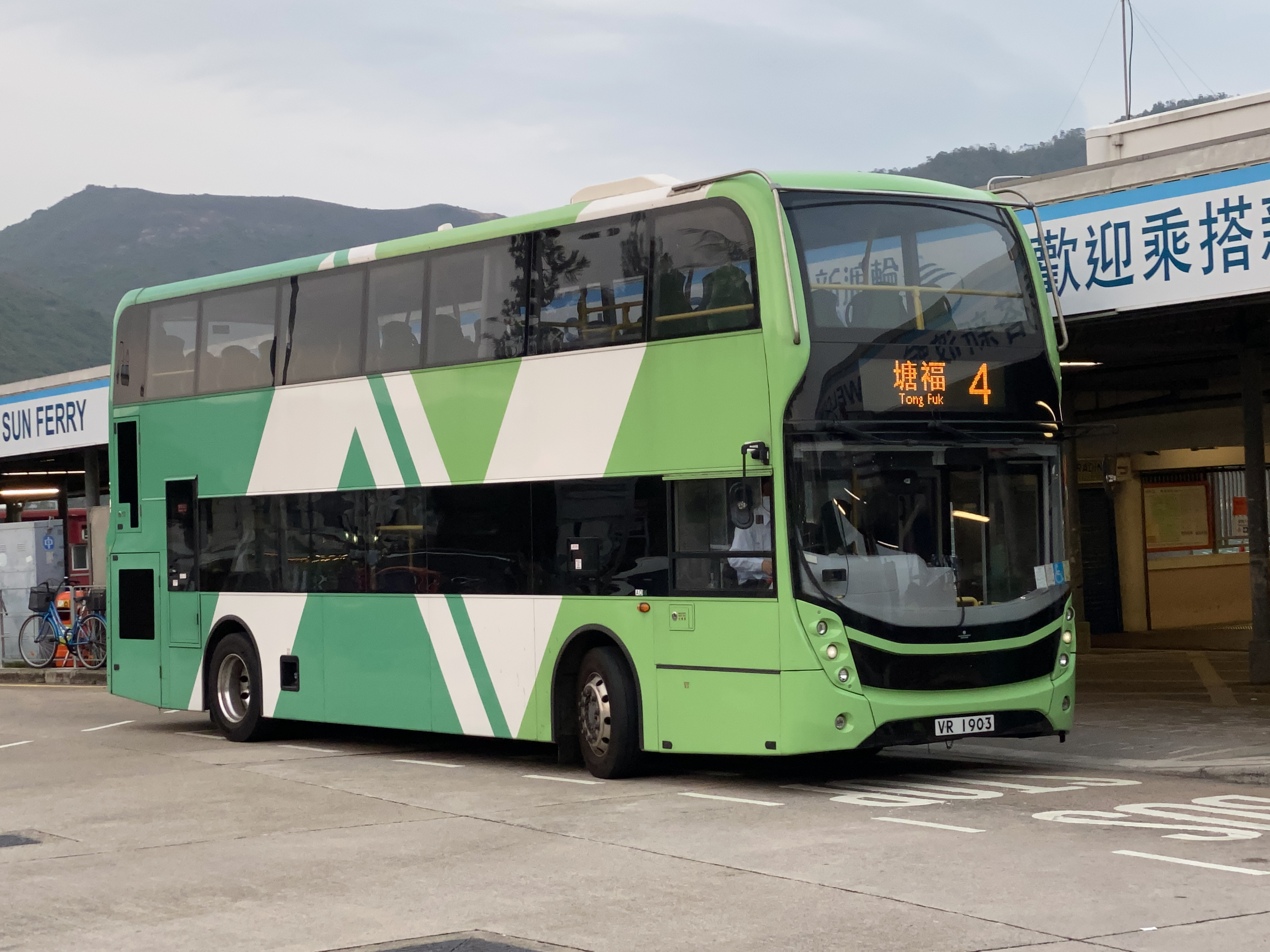
- Alexander Dennis Enviro400 on route 4
- Parent: Kwoon Chung Bus Holdings Limited
- Founded: 1973; 53 years ago
- Service area: Lantau Island, North West New Territories
- Service type: Bus services
- Routes: 28 (March 2024)
- Fleet: 147 (March 2024)
- Website: http://www.nlb.com.hk

New Lantao Bus
- Traditional Chinese: 新大嶼山巴士（1973）有限公司
- Simplified Chinese: 新大屿山巴士（1973）有限公司
Transcriptions
Standard Mandarin
- Hanyu Pinyin: Xīn Dàyǔshān Bāshì (1973) Yǒuxiàngōngsī
Yue: Cantonese
- Yale Romanization: Sān daaih yùh sāan bāa sí (1973) yáuh haahn gūng sī
- Jyutping: San1 daai6 jyu4 saan1 baa1 si2 (1973) jau5 haan6 gung1 si1

The New Lantao Bus Company (1973) Limited, commonly known as New Lantao Bus or NLB, is a franchised bus company operating in Hong Kong. It mainly operates bus routes on Lantau Island.

== History ==
In 1960, Kowloon Motor Bus (KMB) started operating a bus route along the South Lantau Road from Mui Wo to Cheung Sha. The route later extended to Shek Pik following the extension of the road. However, the service incurred tremendous financial losses due to low demand for bus services on Lantau Island and competition from illegally operated vehicles, leading to KMB's retreat from the island in 1965.

After that, the residents of Lantau Island formed three bus companies to take over bus services there. As a solution to vigorous competition between these companies, NLB was formed in 1973 through their merger, and became the third franchised bus company on 1 April 1974.

In January 1992, NLB became a subsidiary of Kwoon Chung Bus Holdings.

NLB's franchise was extended on 1 April 1997 to run until 31 March 2007. It was extended again until 1 March 2017. The current franchise runs from 1 March 2017 to 1 March 2027.

Before the construction of Tung Chung New Town, almost all of NLB's routes terminated at Mui Wo, a town with ferry services to Hong Kong Island. During that time when there were no major towns on Lantau Island, most of the company's routes aimed at connecting the smaller villages around the island to the ferry at Mui Wo. Currently, however, most routes terminate at Tung Chung, where land-based public transport connection to the urban area and Hong Kong International Airport are available. Many of those that formerly terminated at Mui Wo have since been discontinued.

== Coverage ==
As at March 2024, it operated 28 franchised routes. In 2023/24 its network carried around 92,000 passengers per day.

The major service area of the company is Lantau Island. New Lantao Bus was the only bus company operating on the island since its formation until 1997, when Tung Chung New Town was built and road connection to the rest of Hong Kong was opened. It continues to be the only bus company serving the southern part of the Island, carrying an average of 25,000 passengers daily in 2002. It operates 16 regular routes, 4 overnight routes, 2 school-day only routes, 4 holiday-only routes and 1 airport route and 1 special route on Lantau Island as of December 2018.

Most of the routes terminate at Mui Wo and Tung Chung, where there are ferries and MTR to connect to other parts of the territory. Some routes are short-haul routes within the Tung Chung new town. NLB operates a holiday route numbered 1R, running from Hung Hom in Kowloon to Ngong Ping with eight departures on Sundays and public holidays.

In 2007, the Hong Kong–Shenzhen Western Corridor opened, providing a fourth road border crossing with mainland China. NLB won the right to operate a cross-border bus route B2, which runs from Yuen Long MTR station to the border checkpoint at Deep Bay. This mark the first time the company operates a route completely outside Lantau Island.

== Fleet ==
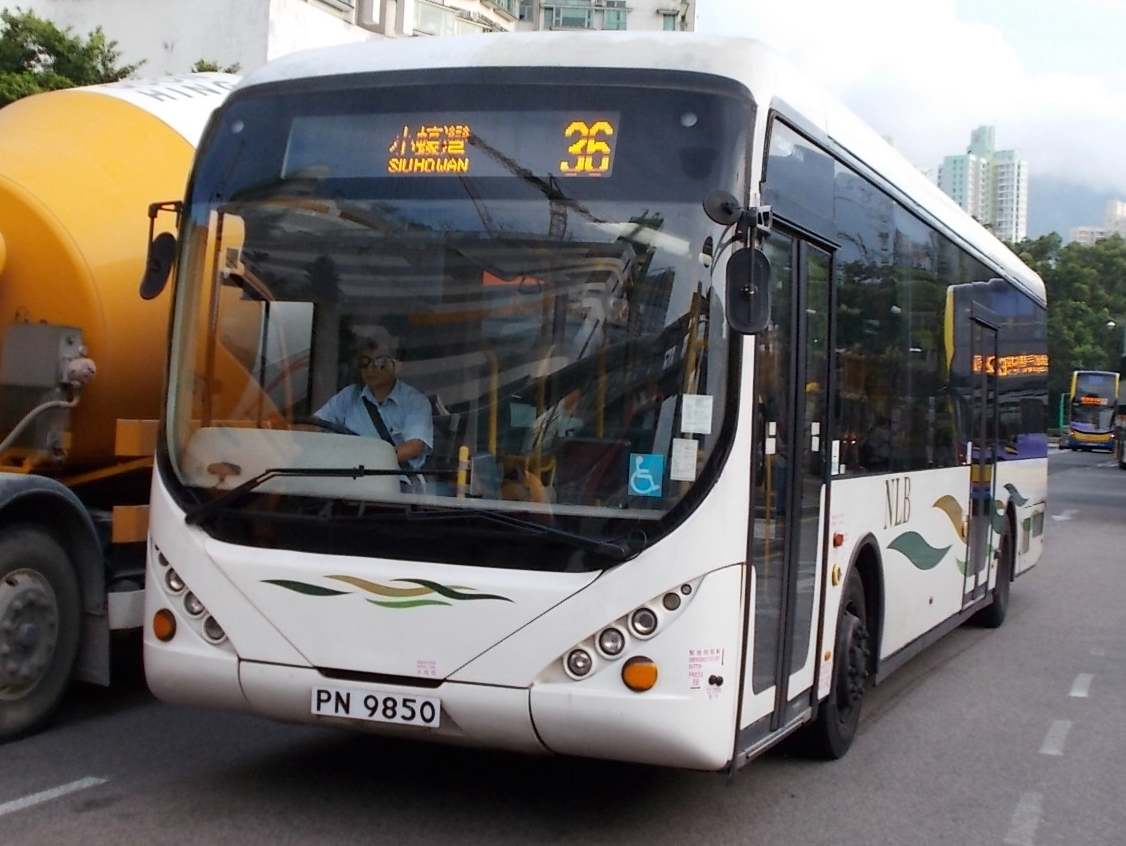
Youngman JNP6122GR on route 36

As of March 2024, the operator owns a fleet of 88 single-decker and 59 double-decker buses.

The current fleet are single-deck buses in the majority with a growing number of double-deck buses including (MAN A95). Most of the single-deck buses operated by New Lantao Bus are German-built MAN buses with local bodywork. Isuzus used to be the major bus before 2009.
