= Chung Yan Road =

Road in Hong Kong

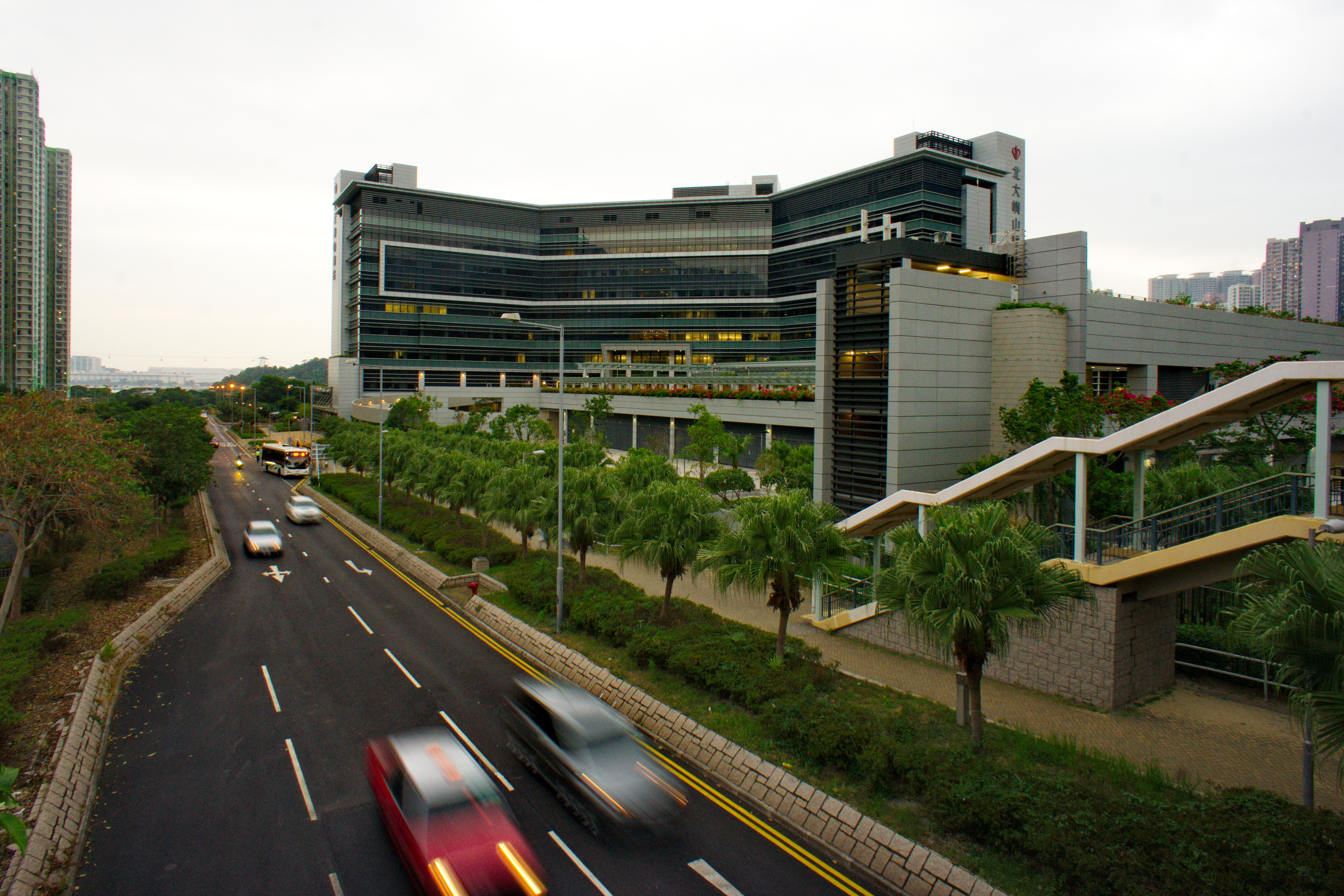
- Chung Yan Road at North Lantau Hospital
- Interactive map of Chung Yan Road
- Native name: 松仁路 (Yue Chinese)
- Former name: Tung Chung Road
- Addresses: Yat Tung Estate, Tung Chung
- Location: Hong Kong

Chung Yan Road (Chinese: 松仁路; pinyin: Sōngrén Lù; Cantonese Yale: cung4 yan4 lou6), is a road in Tung Chung, near Yat Tung Estate.

== See also ==
- North Lantau Hospital
- Yat Tung Estate
- Tung Chung Road
- Tung Chung
