= South Lantau Road =

Major road on Lantau Island, Hong Kong

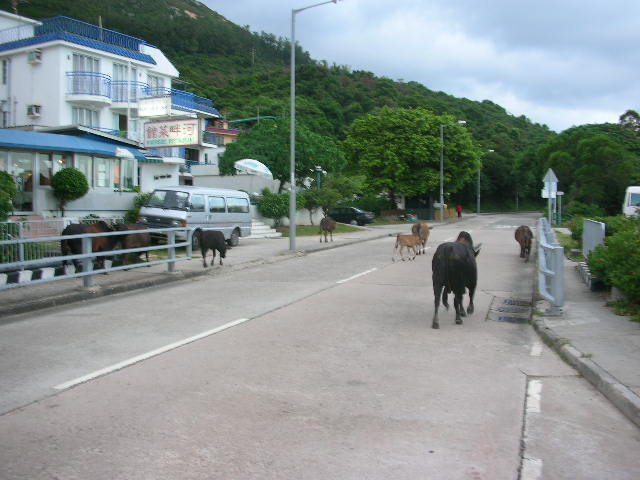
- Cows on South Lantau Road, near Tong Fuk
- Interactive map of South Lantau Road
- Native name: 嶼南道
- Length: 14.5 km (9.0 mi)
- Location: Islands District, Lantau Island, New Territories, Hong Kong
- Coordinates: 22°14′11″N 113°57′04″E
- East end: Mui Wo Ferry Pier, Mui Wo
- West end: Keung Shan Road, Shek Pik

Construction
- Completion: 1957

South Lantau Road 嶼南道
- Traditional Chinese: 嶼南道
- Simplified Chinese: 屿南道
Transcriptions
Standard Mandarin
- Hanyu Pinyin: Yǔnán Dào
Hakka
- Romanization: yu3 nan2 dao4
Yue: Cantonese
- Jyutping: jyu4 naam4 dou6

South Lantau Road (Chinese: 嶼南道) is a road in Islands District, Hong Kong, running between Shek Pik and Mui Wo. It begins at the southern side of Shek Pik Reservoir in Shek Pik in the west, and passes near Shui Hau, Tong Fuk, Cheung Sha, and Pui O, before reaching Mui Wo Ferry Pier in Mui Wo.

== History ==
South Lantau Road was the first road to be built on Lantau Island, originally to improve communications and to open up future development on Lantau Island. In December 1955 work was commenced on the first section between Silvermine Bay and Cheung Sha, and completed in 18 months. The section was opened on 3rd August 1957.

Later, to support the growing number of workers for the Shek Pik Reservoir project, the road was extended to Shek Pik, completed in 1959.

Between 2001 and 2004, a large-scale project was done to upgrade slopes in order to prevent landslides around roads and to better the appearance of manmade slopes around the road. A total of 24 slopes between Nam Shan and Mui Wo were subject to this project.

On 28 June 2021, a large rainstorm caused a landslide uphill from Upper Cheung Sha Beach that covered around 100 meters of the road. The road was closed for one day before it was cleaned up.

== Access ==
The entirety of South Lantau Road is within the Lantau Closed Area, requiring a permit to access by vehicle. Access by road is through Tung Chung Road, leading from Tung Chung in the north.

South Lantau Road is the only way of access by road towards communities in the south and west of Lantau Island, including Tai O, Ngong Ping, and Mui Wo.

== Communities ==
Communities are listed from east to west.

- Mui Wo
- Pui O
- Cheung Sha
- Tong Fuk
- Shui Hau
- Shek Pik

== Intersecting roads ==
Roads are listed from east to west.

- Ngan Kwong Wan Road and Mui Wo Ferry Pier Road
- Chi Ma Wan Road
- Tung Chung Road
- Shek Pik Reservoir Road and Keung Shan Road

== See also ==
- List of roads in Lantau
