= Shui Hau =

Village in Hong Kong

Coordinates: 22.221929°N 113.91482°E

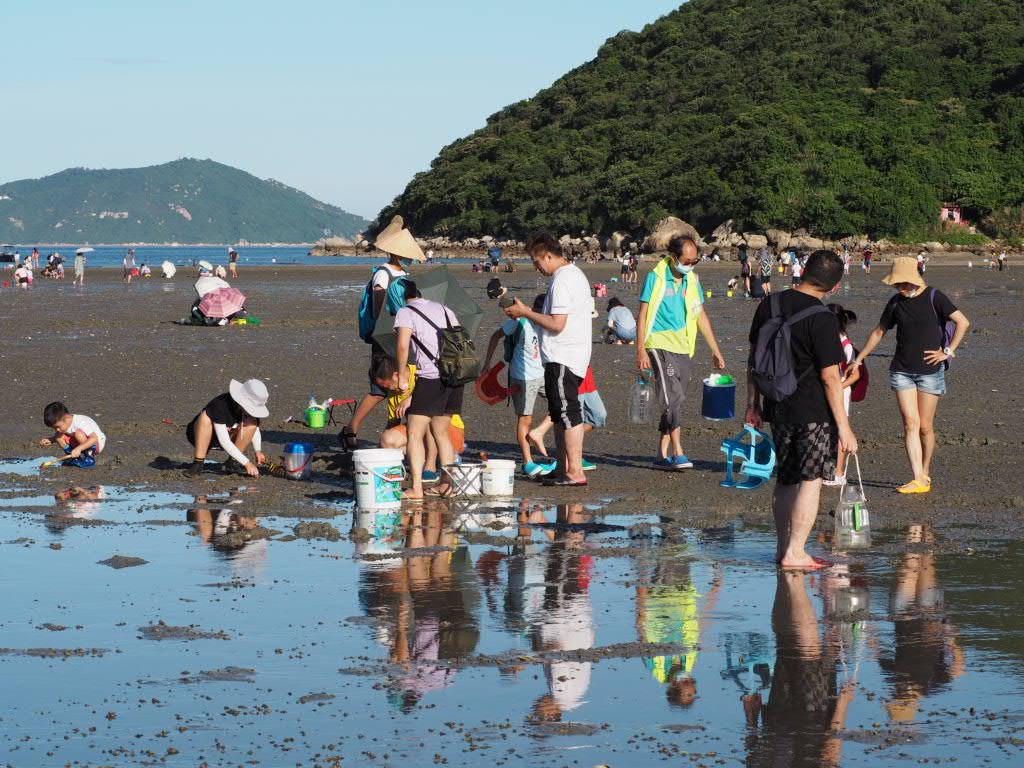
Cockle picking on the Shui Hau Wan mudflats.

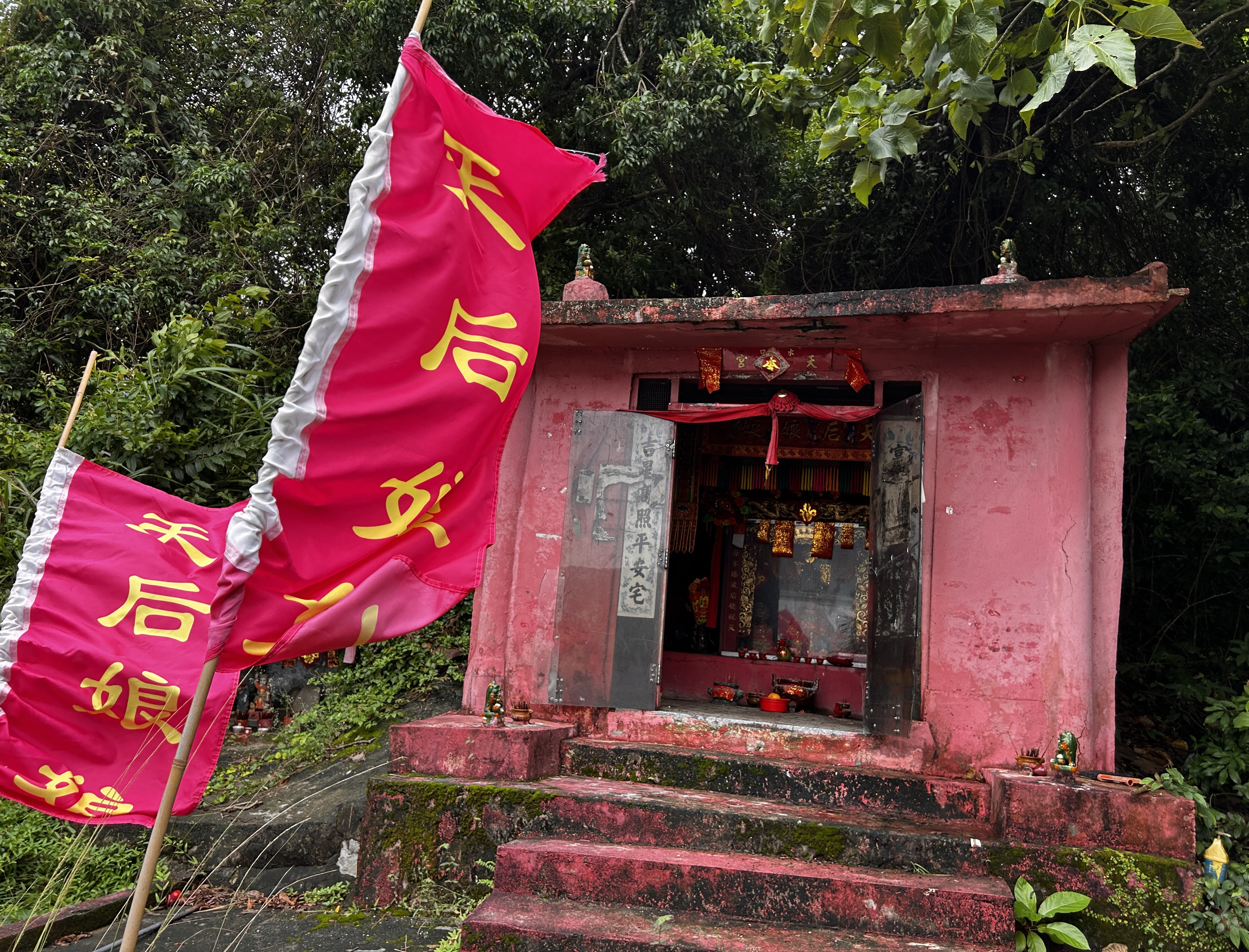
Tin Hau Temple in Shui Hau, facing Shui Hau Wan

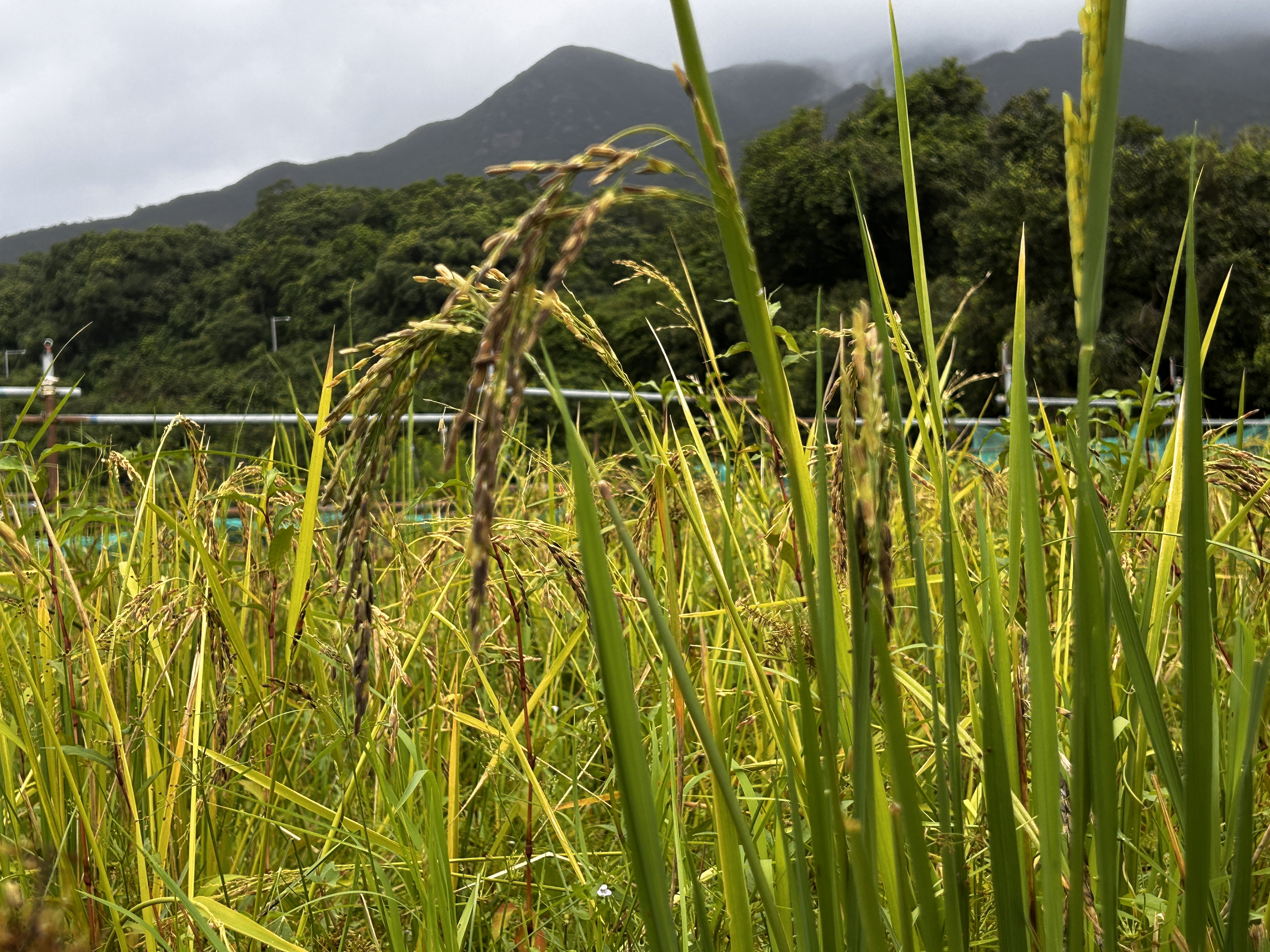
Rice paddy in Shui Hau

Shui Hau (Chinese: 水口; lit. 'mouth of a waterway') is a small village on Lantau Island in Hong Kong.

== Location ==
Shui Hau is located west of Tong Fuk, north of South Lantau Road and south of Lantau Peak. It is close to the South China Sea to its south, facing Shui Hau Wan (水口灣).

== Administration ==
Shui Hau is a recognized village under the New Territories Small House Policy.

== History ==
The village is three hundred years old. It has historically been mainly inhabited by members of the Chan (陳), the Tang (鄧), the Fung (馮) and the Chi (池) clans.

The settlement Shui Hau Tsuen (水口村) was recorded in the 1819 edition of Xin'an Gazetteer.

A village population of 126 was reported by Austin Coates in 1955, while James W. Hayes reported a population of 142 in 1957-58.

The Shui Hau Public School (水口公立學校) was built by the government in 1952. It was closed in 1989 as a consequence of the decrease in students. A Chan Ancestral Hall (陳氏宗祠) had previously been located on the same site until its collapse in the early 20th century. A new one was built and opened in 2000.

== Features ==
The coast at Shui Hau features a tidal flat. The sheltered estuarine sandflat links diverse habitats, harbouring high biodiversity with more than 500 recorded faunal and floral species. This is threatened by disturbance from recreational activities such as paragliding and unregulated clam digging on the intertidal mudflats. With the support of the HKSAR Government Environment and Conservation Fund, to support more sustainable clam-harvesting WWF Hong Kong has designed and disseminated via local stores clam gauges for the public's use under the Sustainable Shui Hau Project.

The long sandy beach is one of the best sites in Hong Kong for kiteboarding and is home of the Hong Kong Kiteboarding School, which has promoted the sport there since 2006.

The house at Nos. 49 and 50 Shui Hau was built around the 1920s by the Chan clan. The walls in the front part of the building are made of granite blocks and its architectural style is Qing vernacular. The house is listed as a Grade III historic building.

Shui Hau is located at the end of Stage 9 and at the start of Stage 10 of the Lantau Trail.
