= Tung Chung North (constituency) =

- Elected constituency for the Islands District Council
- Boundary of Tung Chung North in Islands District
- District: Islands
- Legislative Council constituency: Hong Kong Island West
- Population: 19,398 (2019)
- Electorate: 4,841 (2019)

Current constituency
- Created: 2007
- Number of members: One
- Member: vacant
- Created from: Tung Chung

Tung Chung North is one of the 10 constituencies in the Islands District in Hong Kong.

The constituency returns one district councillor to the Islands District Council, with an election every four years.

Tung Chung North constituency is loosely based on private apartments Seaview Crescent, Coastal Skyline, Caribbean Coast in Tung Chung with an estimated population of 19,398.

== Councillors represented ==
Election	Member	Party
2007	Ophelia Lam Yau-han	Civic
2011	Jeff Lam Yuet	Independent
2014 by-election	Peter Yu Chun-cheung	Civic
2015	Sammi Fu Hiu-lam	NPP
2019	Sammy Tsui Sang-hung→vacant	Democratic

== Election results ==
=== 2010s ===
Islands District Council Election, 2019: Tung Chung North
Party	Candidate	Votes	%	±%
Democratic	Sammy Tsui Sang-hung	1,332	39.56	
DAB	Yip Pui-kei	1,045	31.04	
Roundtable	Louis Poon Chun-yan	990	29.40	
Majority		287	8.52	
Turnout		3,379	69.81	
Democratic gain from NPP		Swing		

Islands District Council Election, 2015: Tung Chung North
Party	Candidate	Votes	%	±%
NPP	Sammi Fu Hiu-lam	1,929	50.4	
Civic	Peter Yu Chun-cheung	1,897	49.6	+0.1
Majority		32	0.8	–0.3
Turnout		3,863	51.6	+10.9
NPP gain from Civic		Swing		

Tung Chung North by-election, 2014
Party	Candidate	Votes	%	±%
Civic	Peter Yu Chun-cheung	1,330	49.5	+5.7
Nonpartisan	Leung Siu-tong	1,299	48.4	
Nonpartisan	Juliana Cheung Fong-han	57	2.1	
Majority		31	1.1	
Turnout		2,704	40.7	
Civic gain from Independent		Swing		

Islands District Council Election, 2011: Tung Chung North
Party	Candidate	Votes	%	±%
Independent	Jeff Lam Yuet	1,509	56.2	
Civic	Jeremy Jansen Tam Man-ho	1,177	43.8	+16.9
Independent gain from Civic		Swing		

=== 2000s ===
Islands District Council Election, 2007: Tung Chung North
Party	Candidate	Votes	%	±%
Civic	Ophelia Lam Yau-han	554	35.1	
DAB	Samuel Cheng Tin-lok	466	29.5	
Independent	Jeremy Jansen Tam Man-ho	441	27.9	
LSD	Paulo Wong Kwong-yee	50	3.2	
Civic win (new seat)				
