= Shek Pik =

Area of Lantau Island, Hong Kong

Shek Pik 石壁
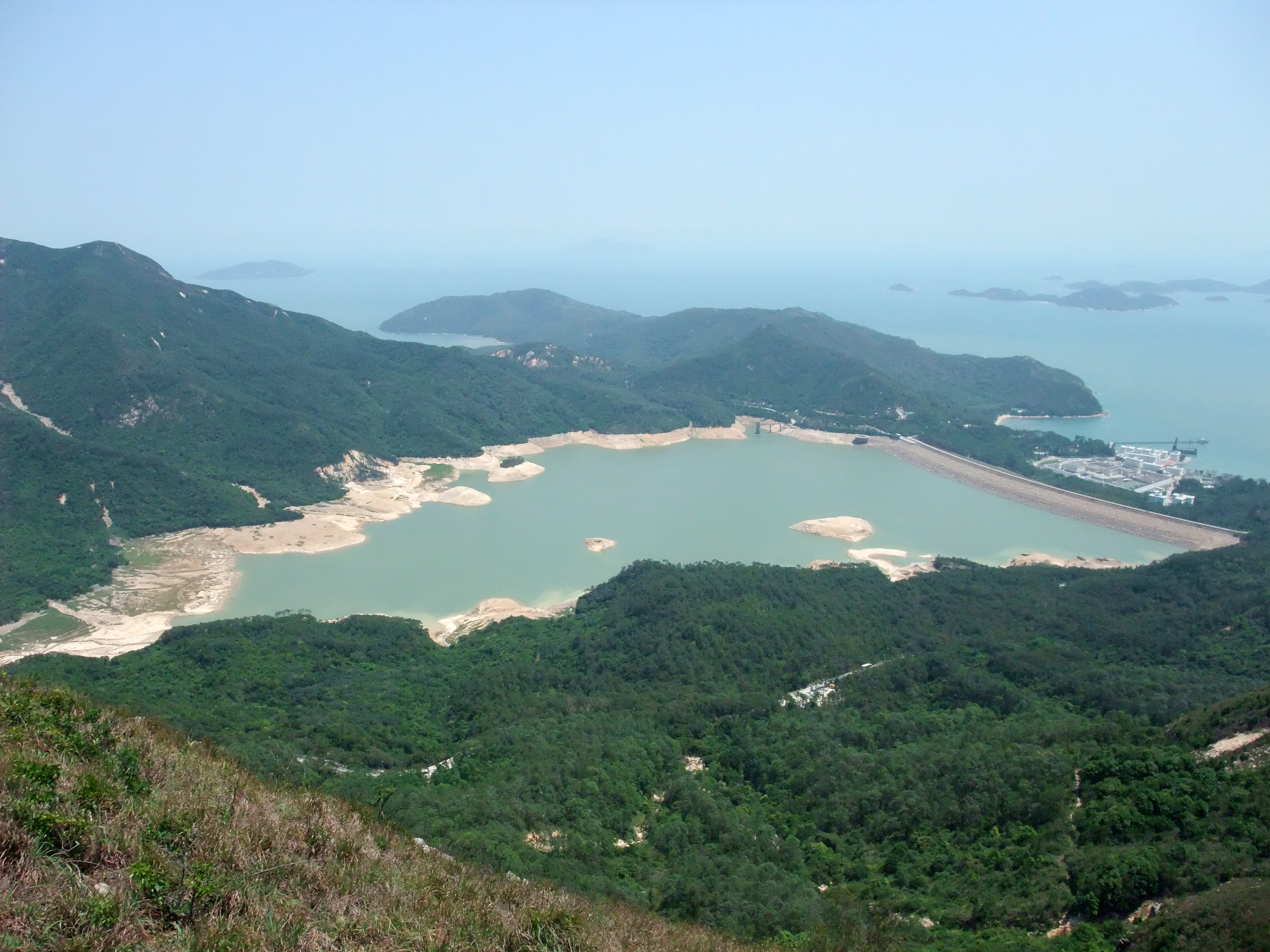
- Shek Pik Reservoir, with Shek Pik Prison visible on the right.

- Location within Hong Kong
- Coordinates: 22.222906°N 113.897839°E
- Country: Hong Kong
- District: Islands District

Shek Pik
- Chinese: 石壁
- Cantonese Yale: Sehk bīk
- Literal meaning: Stone wall
Transcriptions
Standard Mandarin
- Hanyu Pinyin: Shí Bì
Yue: Cantonese
- Yale Romanization: Sehk bīk
- Jyutping: Sek6 bik3
- IPA: [sɛk̚˨.pɪk̚˧]

Shek Pik (Chinese: 石壁) is an area located along the southwestern coast of Lantau Island, Hong Kong. When the Shek Pik Reservoir was built, villages at Shek Pik were demolished and the villagers were relocated to other parts of Lantau Island and to Tsuen Wan. Below the dam of the reservoir is Shek Pik Prison.

== Geography ==
Shek Pik was originally a north-south oriented valley, until all the upper part was filled by the water of the Shek Pik Reservoir, which was completed in 1963. Before the construction of the reservoir, the valley was settled by several villages and most of the valley floor and the foothills were occupied by terraced paddy fields. The southern part of Shek Pik is facing the South China Sea and features three small bays. From West to East: Tai Long Wan (大浪灣), Chung Hau (涌口) and Tung Wan (東灣; 'eastern bay').

== Villages ==
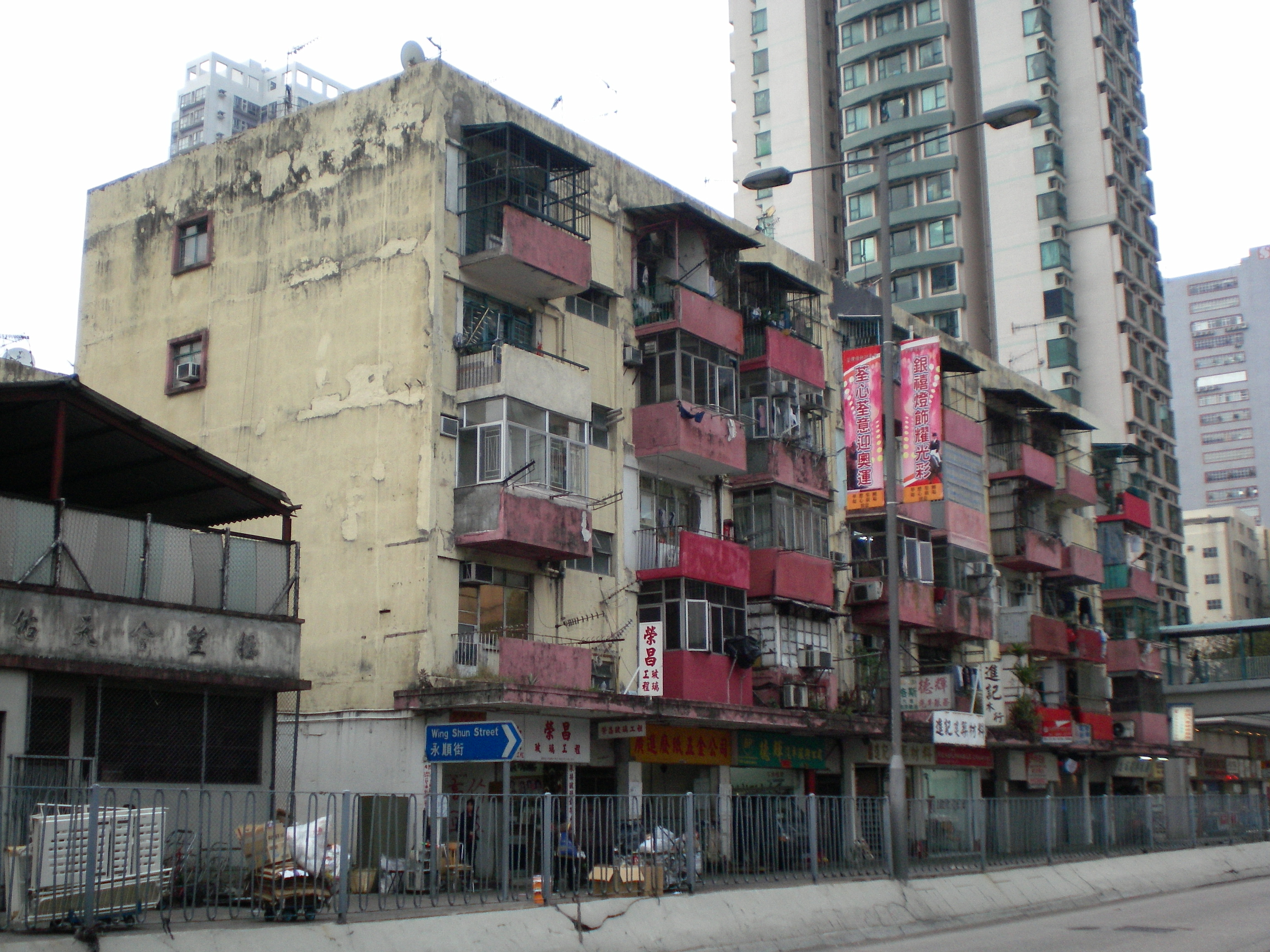
Shek Pik New Village in Tsuen Wan in 2008.

A tradition mentions that a clan from Ma Tau Wai in Kowloon accompanied the last two young emperors to Lautau Island and finally settled in Shek Pik to avoid the Mongol invasion at the end of Southern Song (1127–1279). Based on the review of historic documents, the existence of village settlements at Shek Pik can be traced back to the Ming Dynasty (1368–1644), although the area may have been settled earlier.

Shek Pik is one of five villages of Lantau that were resettled when the coastal restriction of the Great Clearance was lifted in 1669. The other villages are Tung Sai Chung, Lo Pui O, Tai O and Mui Wo.

The village settlements at Shek Pik were largely self-sufficient farming and coastal fishing communities. The main village, Shek Pik Wai (石壁圍; 'the walled village of Shek Pik'), was located near the head of the main valley. A populous place in the mid-19th century, its population had declined to 363 inhabitants by the time of the 1911 Hong Kong Colony census, and numbered 202 in 1957. Fan Pui Village (墳背村) had 59 inhabitants at each count.

The villages of Shek Pik Valley - Shek Pik, Fan Pui, Kong Pui (崗貝) and the hamlet of Hang Tsai (坑仔) - were demolished and cleared to allow construction of the Shek Pik Reservoir. A total of about 260 people were resettled as a consequence. Most of the villagers of Shek Pik Village moved into five-storey apartment blocks in the urban Shek Pik New Village (石碧新村) in Tsuen Wan. Most of the villagers of Fan Pui moved to a new village nearby, Tai Long Wan Tsuen (大浪灣村) at Tai Long Wan, Shek Pik. Some families from both villages moved to a row of houses near Mui Wo Ferry Pier.

The villagers of Fan Pui had chosen to move to the nearby new rural village of Tai Long Wan Tsuen in order to continue farming. Remodeling long abandoned fields allowed to provide them with about the same acreage of rice fields near the new village. Tai Long Wan had a population of about 120 people in 1970. By 1983, with the younger villagers moving to the city, the population had declined to 22 and most of the farming activity had ceased.

Tai Long Wan is a recognized village under the New Territories Small House Policy.

== Rock carvings ==
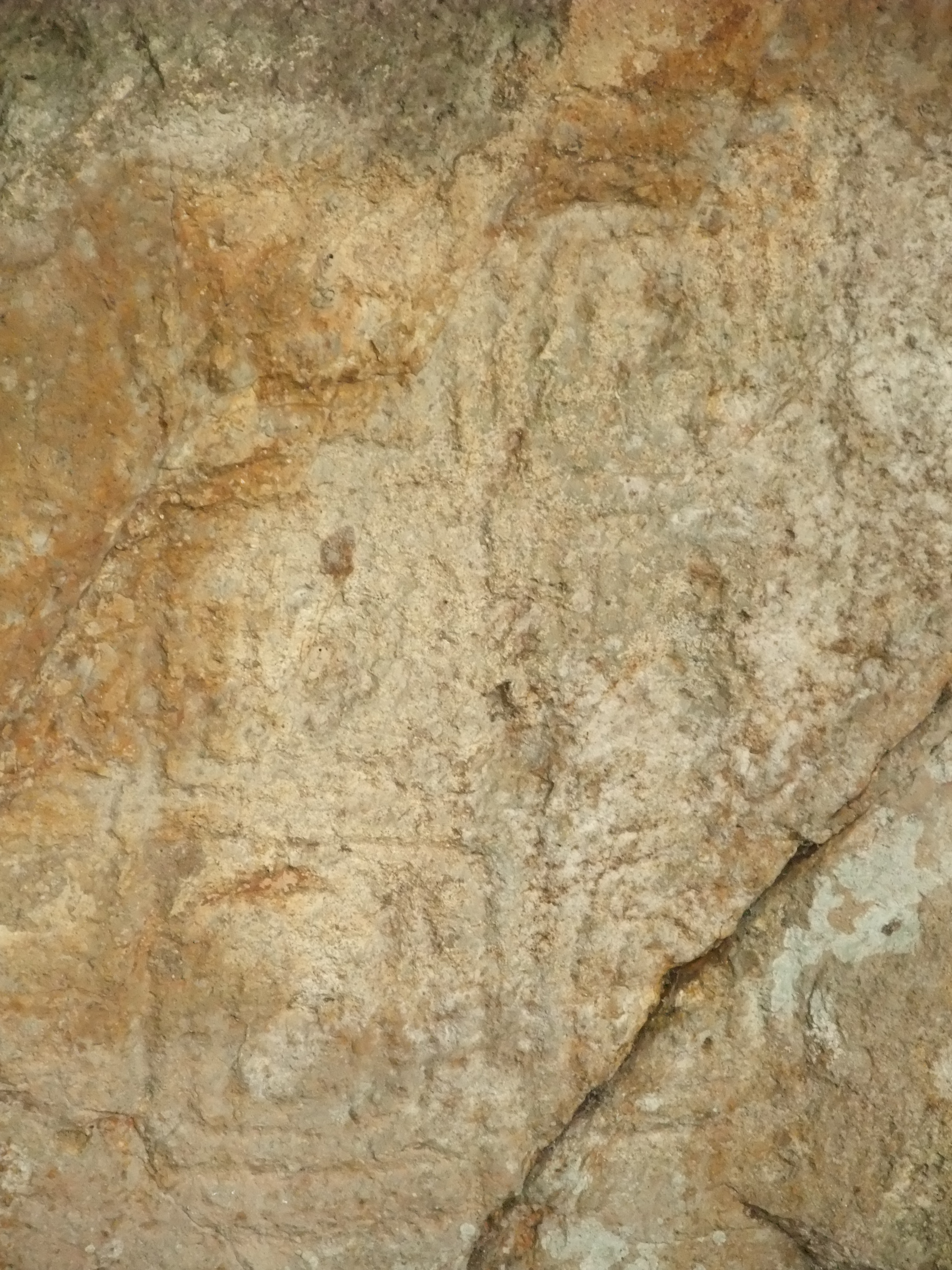
Lower Shek Pik Rock Carving

Rock carvings from the Neolithic age were found by Chen Kung-chiek in Shek Pik in 1939 when the local villagers told him there was an engraved carving on the upper part of the beach and to the west of Tung Wan. There was the second carving found on the opposite side of the valley. It has been split into two parts by lightning and the rock is now lying face down so the carving cannot be seen.

According to the local villagers, there is the third carving further up the valley. This carving, (later called "the upper Shek Pik Rock Carving" to distinguish it from the one found on the Shek Pik Beach) was found on a steep slope in Shek Pik in 1962. The carving is at 350 m (1,148 ft) above sea level.

The Lower Shek Pik Rock Carving, located about 300m from the coastline, was listed as a declared monument of Hong Kong in 1979.

== Temples ==
A Hau Wong Temple used to be the focal point of the village life at Shek Pik. It was inundated by the Shek Pik Reservoir in 1960. A Hung Shing Temple was located at Chung Hau. It was ruined as in 1979. A new temple was built in 1960 at Tai Long Wan.

== Prison and detention centre ==
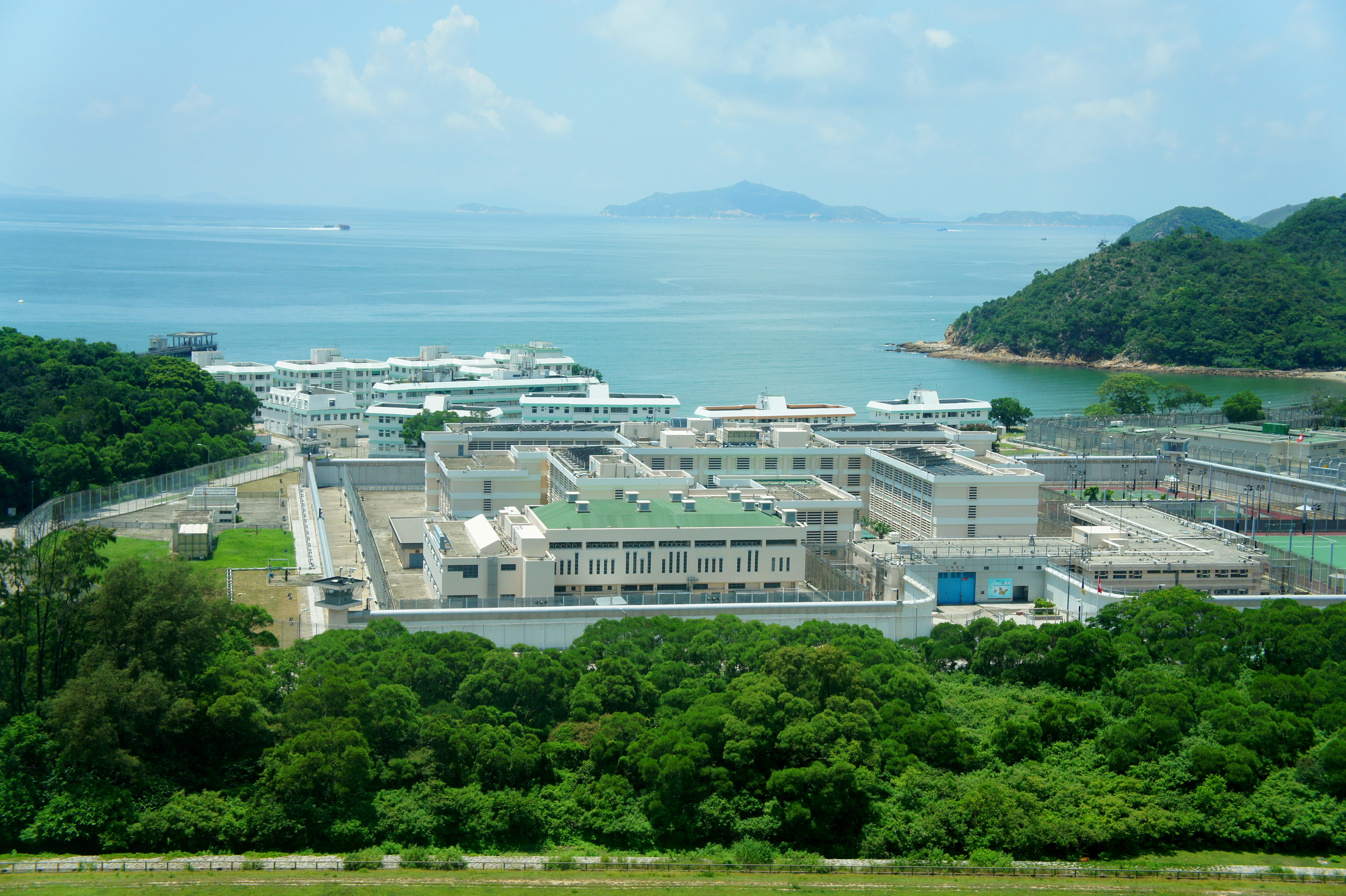
Shek Pik Prison.

Two institutions operated by the Correctional Services Department are located at Chung Hau and Shek Pik: the Sha Tsui Detention Centre and the Shek Pik Prison. Sha Tsui Detention Centre is a minimum security institution for male young offenders. It was established in 1972. Shek Pik Prison is a maximum security institution, housing male adults serving medium to long-term sentences, including life imprisonment. It was established in 1984.

== Others ==
The Hong Kong Red Cross Shek Pik Camp, opened in 1968, is located at Tung Wan. The Shek Pik Tung Wan Beach (石壁東灣海灘) is located nearby. There is also a beach at Tai Long Wan.

== Access ==
The area can be reached from Tai O via Tai O Road and Keung Shan Road, and from Mui Wo via South Lantau Road.

Shek Pik is located at the end of Stage 8 and at the beginning of Stage 9 of the Lantau Trail.
