= Islands District =

District in Hong Kong

Islands 離島區
- District
- Islands District
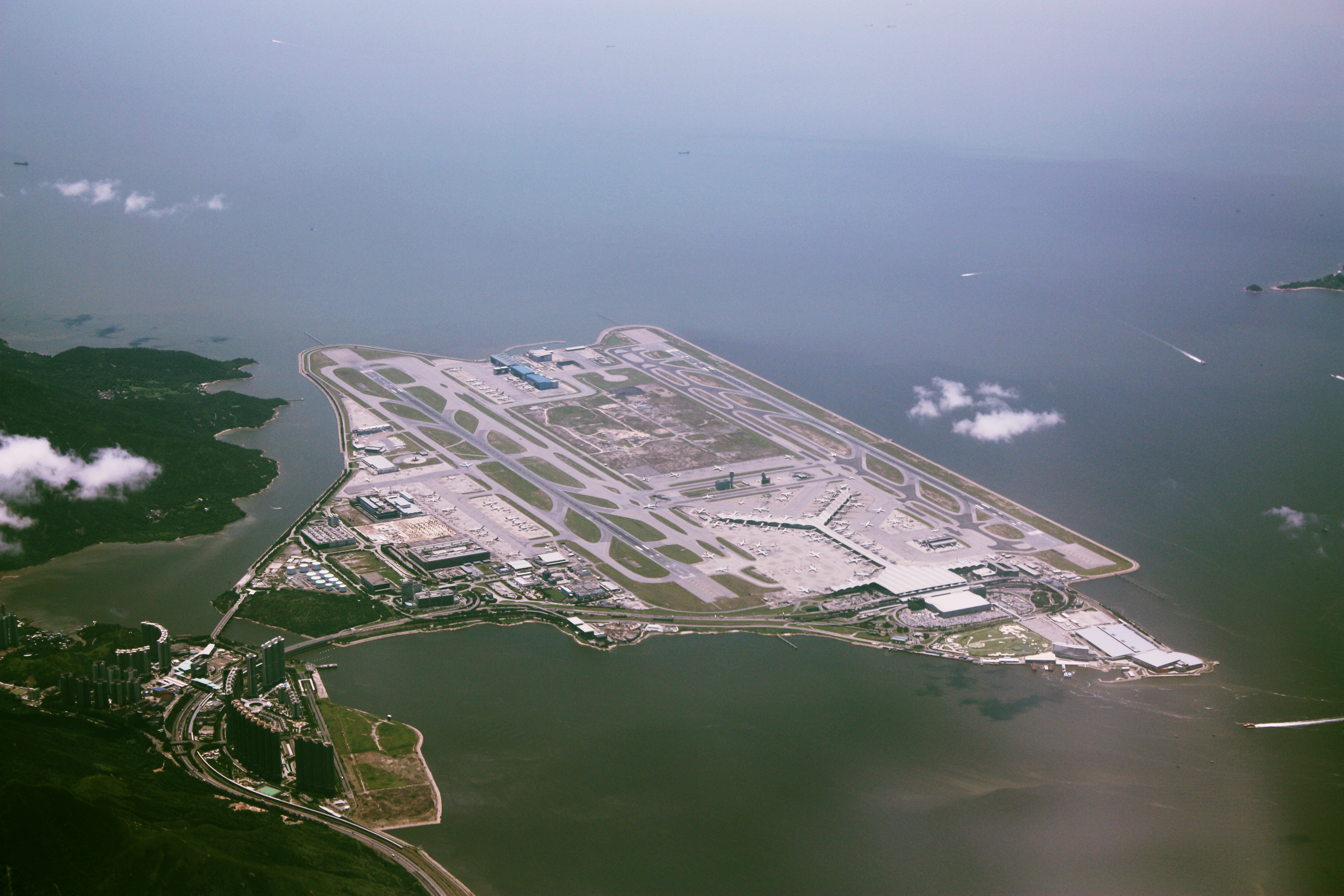
- Hong Kong International Airport

- Location of Islands District within Hong Kong
- Interactive map of Islands
- Coordinates: 22°15′40″N 113°56′46″E
- Sovereign State: China
- Territory: Hong Kong
- District: New Territories
- Constituencies: 10

Government
  - District Officer: Yu Hong Kwan
  - District Council Vice-Chairman: Wong Man Hon

Area
  - Total: 175.03 km^{2} (67.58 sq mi)

Population (2021)
  - Total: 185,282: 78.1% Chinese; 5.9% White; 5.3% Filipino
  - Density: 1,058.6/km^{2} (2,741.7/sq mi)
- Time zone: UTC+8 (Hong Kong Time)
- Largest neighbourhood by population: Tung Chung (86,403 – 2016 est)
- Location of district office and district council: Harbour Building, 38 Pier Road (in Central and Western District)
- Website: Islands District Council

Islands District
- Traditional Chinese: 離島區
- Simplified Chinese: 离岛区
- Cantonese Yale: Lèihdóu kēui
- Literal meaning: distant island district
Transcriptions
Standard Mandarin
- Hanyu Pinyin: Lí dǎo Qū
Yue: Cantonese
- Yale Romanization: Lèihdóu kēui
- Jyutping: Lei4dou2 keoi1
- IPA: [lej˩.tɔw˧˥ kʰɵɥ˥]

The Islands District is one of the 18 districts of Hong Kong. It is part of the New Territories. It had a population of 185,282 in 2021.

Hong Kong consists of a peninsula and 263 islands. The Islands District consists of some twenty large and small islands which lie to the south and southwest of Hong Kong. Notable areas that are part of the Islands District include Chek Lap Kok, the reclaimed island on which Hong Kong International Airport is located, Tung Chung on northern Lantau near the airport, and Discovery Bay, a large private residential area on eastern Lantau.

== Islands of Hong Kong ==
Many islands of Hong Kong are actually not part of the district. Most notably, Hong Kong Island contains four districts itself. The term Outlying Islands tends to refer to the islands of the Islands District. The northeast point of Lantau and Ma Wan traditionally belong to Tsuen Wan District owing to their administration and transport dependence of Tsuen Wan. Tsing Yi Island once was administered by Tsuen Wan District (1982 to 1985) and now by Kwai Tsing District. Whilst the Sai Kung Islands are part of the Sai Kung District, and the Tolo Channel islands part of Tai Po District.

== Demographics ==
With an area that is 16% of Hong Kong and a population that is 2% of Hong Kong, the Islands District is the largest in terms of area and also the least populated. It is therefore the district with by far the lowest population density of 783/km^{2} (2,030/sq mi). The outlying islands are notable for a more relaxed way of life than that of Hong Kong Island and Kowloon Peninsula. The district has the third-youngest residents.

Collectively, Mui Wo and Tai O on Lantau, Cheung Chau, Lamma Island and Peng Chau are more populated than the rest of the area of the district.

As of 2021, the district has a population of 185,282. 78.1% of the population are Chinese. Ethnic minority groups include White (5.8%) and Filipino (5.3%).

== Islands of the district ==
- Cha Kwo Chau
- Chek Lap Kok (Hong Kong International Airport is built here)
- Cheung Chau
- Hei Ling Chau
  - Sunshine Island (Chau Kung To)
- Peaked Hill (Kai Yek Kok)
- Kau Yi Chau
  - Siu Kau Yi Chau
- Lamma Island
  - Luk Chau (George Island)
- Lantau Island (The largest part of the district)
  - Discovery Bay
  - Mui Wo
  - Tai O
  - Tung Chung
- Peng Chau
  - Tai Lei
- Po Toi Islands
  - Lo Chau (Beaufort Island)
  - Mat Chau
  - Po Toi
  - Sung Kong
  - Waglan Island
- Shek Kwu Chau
- Soko Islands
  - Cheung Muk Tau
  - Ma Chau
  - Siu A Chau
  - Tai A Chau
  - Tau Lo Chau
  - Yuen Chau
  - Yuen Kong Chau

== Transport ==
Most of the islands in the Islands District have ferry services linking them with each other and the remainder of the territory, along with Macau and nearby cities in the Pearl Delta, including Guangzhou and Shenzhen. Public ferry piers are located at Tai O (Wing Hong Street, Shek Tsai Po), Tung Chung, Hong Kong International Airport, Cheung Chau Wan, Mui Wo (Silvermine Bay), Lamma Island (Yung Shue Wan, Sok Kwu Wan), Discovery Bay, Chi Ma Wan, and Peng Chau.

However, only Lantau Island has a fixed link to the New Territories and the rest of Hong Kong. This is via the North Lantau Highway and the Lantau Link, part of the Airport Core Programme completed in 1998. Most recently, since 2018, Lantau is the location of the Hong Kong port of entry for the Hong Kong–Zhuhai–Macau Bridge.

Lantau is also the only island in the Islands District with a well-developed public transport network on land. It has the only MTR stations within the district; they are Tung Chung on the Tung Chung line and two on the Airport Express serving the airport and AsiaWorld Expo (Sunny Bay and Disneyland Resort on the Disneyland Resort line administratively lie in Tsuen Wan District). Finally, Lantau is the only island with franchised taxis and buses, the latter mainly provided by New Lantao Bus (although other operators serve the northern shore, the airport, Disneyland, and Discovery Bay).

== Education ==
Hong Kong Public Libraries operates has three libraries on Lantau, all in Islands District: Mui Wo, Tai O, and Tung Chung. Additionally it has two libraries on Lamma Island (North Lamma in Yung Shue Wan and South Lamma in Sok Kwu Wan) and one each in Cheung Chau and Peng Chau.

== See also ==
- List of islands and peninsulas of Hong Kong
- List of places in Hong Kong
