= List of Hong Kong placename etymologies =

The following is a non-exhaustive list of the etymologies of place names in Hong Kong.

City	Language origin	Feature	Named for	Alternative name / spelling	Derived place names	Named by
Victoria	English	person	Victoria of the United Kingdom		Victoria Harbour; Victoria Peak	
Kowloon	Chinese	geographic	nine dragons or nine hills		Kowloon City; Kowloon Bay; Kowloon Tong; Kowloon Tsai; Kowloon Peak; Kowloon Point	Emperor Bing of Song
Lantau	Cantonese	geographic	ragged head	Lantao	Lantau Peak; Lantau Island	
Aberdeen	English	person	George Hamilton-Gordon, The 4th Earl of Aberdeen		Aberdeen Harbour; Aberdeen Island	
Aldrich Bay	English	person	Major Edward Aldrich			
Admiralty	English	historic	Wellington Barracks			
Anderson	English	person	Charles Alexander Anderson	Tai Sheung Tok		
Bowrington	English	person	John Bowring			
Butterfly Valley	English	fauna	a historical butterfly habitat			
Cape Collinson	English	person	Major-General Thomas Bernard Collinson	Hak Kok Tau		
Castle Peak	English	geographic				
Crocodile Hill	English	geographic		Lok Yee Shan		
Causeway Bay	English	geographic		East Point		
D'Aguilar Peak	English	person	Major-General Sir George Charles d'Aguilar		Cape D'Aguilar; D'Aguilar Peninsula	
Deep Water Bay	English	geographic				
Discovery Bay	English					
Eagle's Nest	English	geographic		Tsim Shan		
Fortress Hill	English	historic	North Point Battery			
Gin Drinkers Bay	English	historic		Kwai Chung O		
Hammer Hill	English	geographic				
Happy Valley	English	activity	Happy Valley Racecourse	Wong Nai Chung Valley		
Jordan Valley	English	person	Gregory Paul Jordan			
Kellett Island	English	person	Henry Kellett	Tang Lung Chau		
Kennedy Town	English	person	Sir Arthur Edward Kennedy			
King's Park	English	person				
Lamma Island	Portuguese	cartographic			Lamma Channel	
Leighton Hill	English	person	A H. Leighton			
Mount Davis	English	person	Sir John Francis Davis			
Mount Kellett	English	person	Henry Kellett		Kellett Bay	
North Point	Literal English	geographic				
Penny's Bay	English	person				
Plover Cove	English	geographic		Shuen Wan		
Possession Point	English	historic	The landing point of first British troops	Shui Hang Hau		
Rennie's Mill	English	historic	Rennie's Flour Mill (closed)	Tiu Keng Leng		
Repulse Bay	English	historic	HMS Repulse			
Sandy Bay	English	geographic		Tai Hau Wan		
Silvermine Bay	English	historic	Silver mining			
Silverstrand	English	geographic				
Stanley	English	person	Lord Edward Smith-Stanley			
Stonecutters Island	English	activity	Stonecutting	Ngong Shuen Chau		
Sugarloaf Peak	English	geographic		Shui Chuen O		
Sunny Bay	English	activity	Renamed as per request from The Walt Disney Company upon the opening of the Hong Kong Disneyland	Yam O Ta Shui Wan		
Sunset Peak	English	geographic		Tai Tung Shan		
Tamar	English	historic	HMS Tamar			
Tate's Cairn	English	person	George Passman Tate	Tai Lo Shan		
Telegraph Bay	English	historic	Cable and Wireless' Hong Kong cable port			
Waterfall Bay	English	geographic				
West Point	Literal English	geographic		Sai Ying Pun		
Whitehead	English	person	Thomas Henderson Whitehead	Pak Shek		
Beacon Hill	Literal Chinese	historic	beacon constructed during Ming dynasty			
Big Wave Bay	Literal Chinese	geographic		Tai Long Wan		
Bride's Pool	Literal Chinese	historic	legend of a bride falling into the pool and drowned			
Cheung Chau	Cantonese	geographic	long island			
Clearwater Bay	Literal Chinese	geographic		Clear Water Bay		
Diamond Hill	Literal Chinese (mistranslation)	activity	Stone-mining (lit. 鑽石) as a verb, which means diamond when used as a noun			
Fanling	Cantonese	geographic	powdery peak			
Homantin	Cantonese	person	land of Ho's and Man's	Ho Man Tin		
Joss House Bay	Literal Chinese	building	joss house	Tai Miu Wan		
Kai Tak	Cantonese	person	land of Ho Kai and Au Tak			
Kwun Tong	Cantonese	historic	Koon Fu (government-owned) salt yards			
Lei Yue Mun	Cantonese	fauna	carp's channel	Lyemun; Lymoon; Ly-e-Mun		
Ma Wan	Cantonese		horse bay			
Mongkok	Cantonese	geographic	bustling corner	Mong Kok		
Mui Wo	Cantonese	geographic	plum nest			
Peng Chau	Cantonese		flat island			
Pokfulam	Cantonese			Pok Fu Lam		
Sai Kung Town	Cantonese	activity				
Sha Tau Kok	Cantonese		sandy head point			
Sha Tin	Cantonese	geographic	sandy field	Shatin		
Shek O	Cantonese	geographic	rocky bay			
Shek Tong Tsui	Cantonese	geographic	stone quarry point			
Sok Kwu Wan	Cantonese					
Tai O	Cantonese	geographic				
Tai Po	Hakka Chinese	historic	big step			
Tolo Harbour	Cantonese	activity	Pearl (lo) harvesting		Tolo Channel	
Tin Shui Wai	Cantonese	geographic				
Tseung Kwan O	Cantonese	historic	General's Bay	Junk Bay		
Tsuen Wan	Cantonese	geographic	shallow bay			
Tuen Mun	Literal Chinese	historic	military camp			
Yuen Long	Cantonese	geographic	round plains	Un Long		
Yung Shue Wan	Cantonese		Banyan Tree Bay			

== See also ==
- Place names of Hong Kong
