= Silvermine =

Silvermine is a word used in numerous place names around the world.

== Hong Kong ==
- Silvermine Bay, a bay in Mui Wo, Lantau Island
- Silver Mine Bay Beach, also known as Silvermine Bay Beach

== Ireland ==
- Silvermine Mountains, a mountain range in County Tipperary
- Silvermines, a town in that mountain range, and also a defunct mining site in the area

== South Africa ==
- Silvermine Nature Reserve, part of the Table Mountain National Park in Cape Town

== United States ==
- Silvermine, Connecticut, a neighborhood in Fairfield County
- Silver Mine, Missouri, an unincorporated community
- Silvermine River, in Norwalk and New Canaan, Connecticut
