= Tai Ngau Wu Teng =

- 大牛湖頂
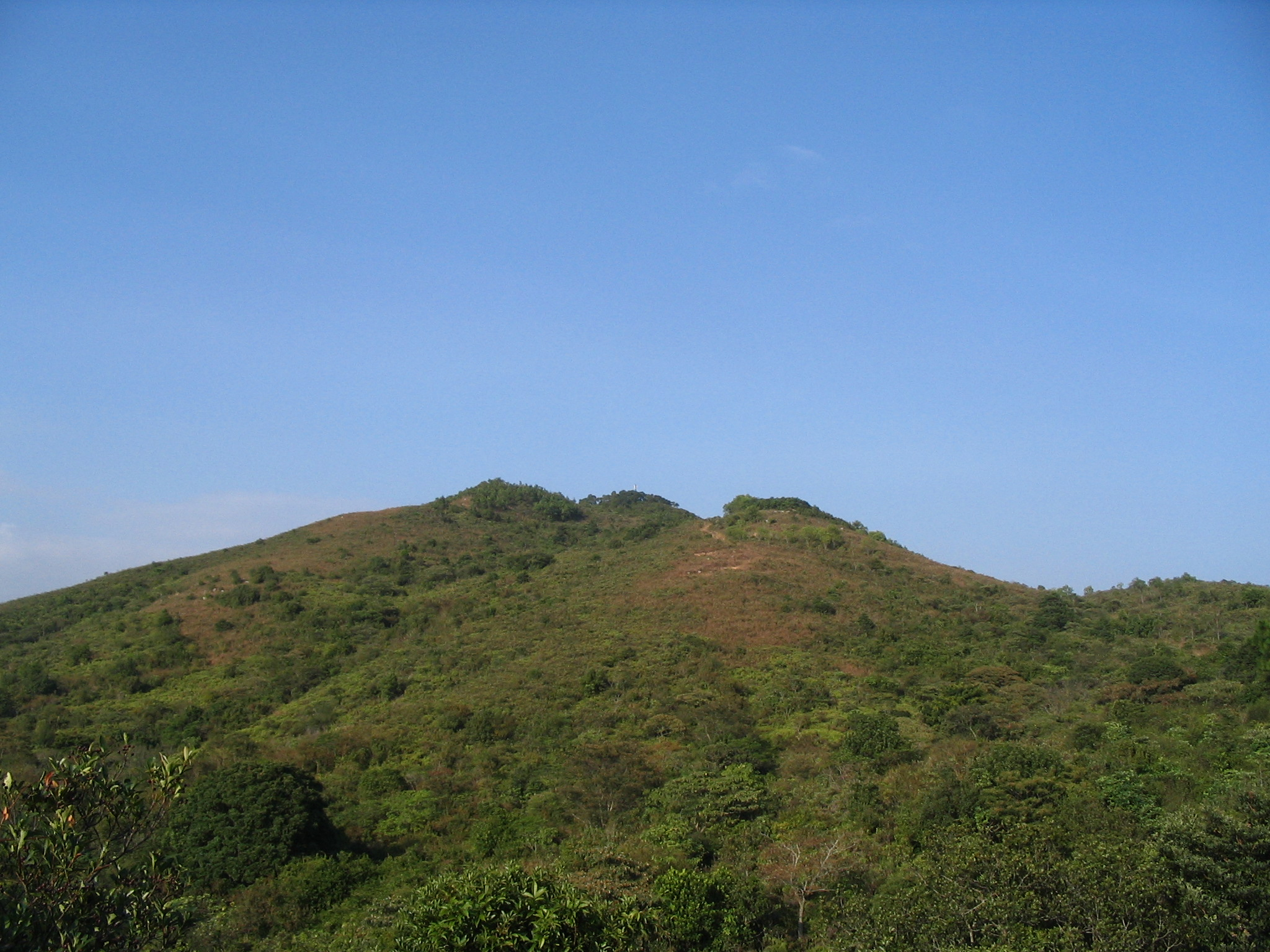
- Summit of Tai Ngau Wu Teng

Highest point
- Elevation: 275 m (902 ft)
- Coordinates: 22°14′59″N 113°59′22″E

Geography
- Location within Hong Kong
- Location: Lantau Island, Hong Kong

Tai Ngau Wu Teng (Chinese: 大牛湖頂; lit. 'Elderly Mountain') is a mountain in the southeastern part of Lantau Island, Hong Kong, with a height of 275 metres (902 ft) above sea level.

== Geology ==
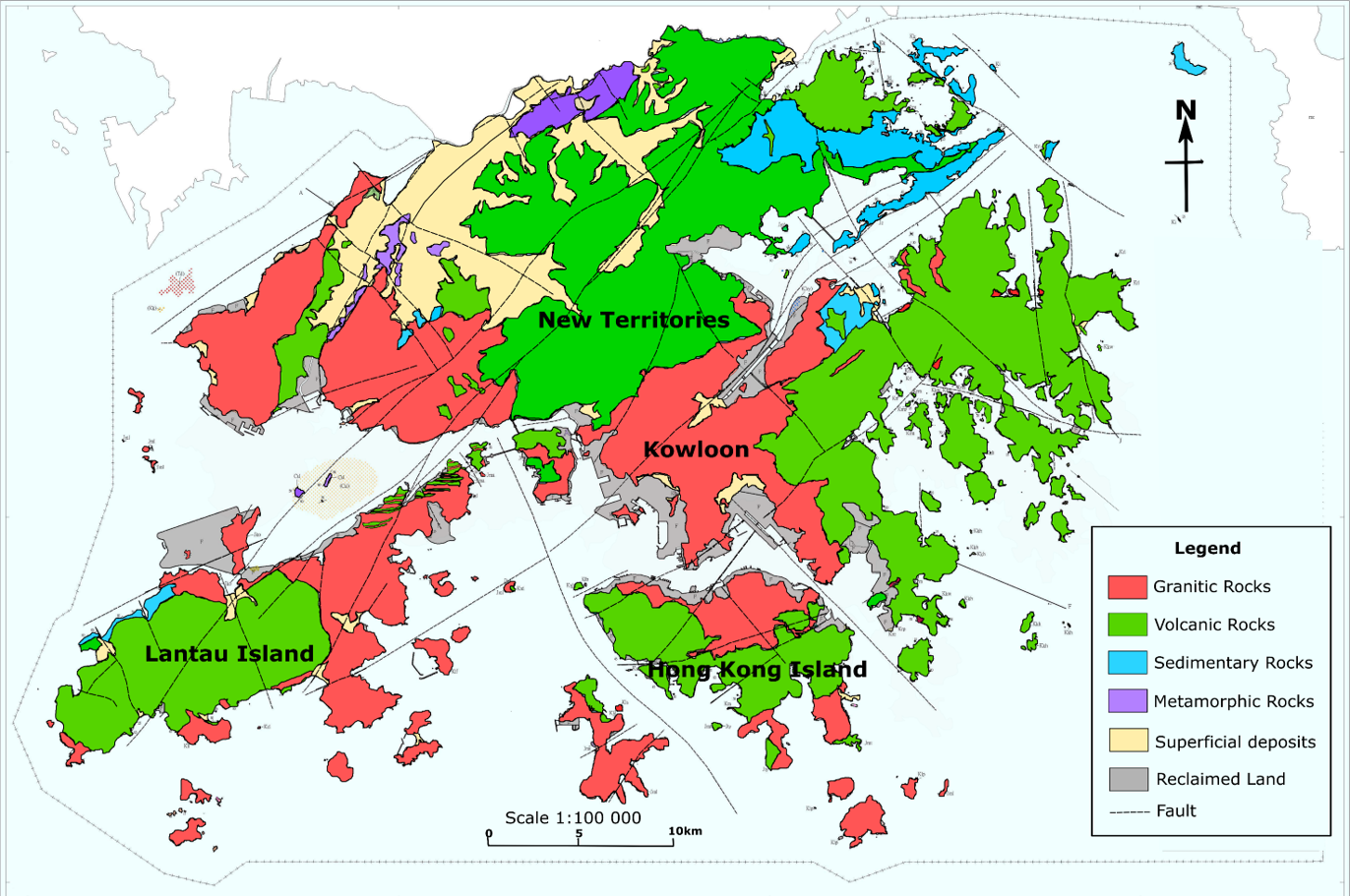
Tai Ngau Wu Teng is in the Red area on Lantau Island

Tai Wu Ngau Teng is formed by Granitic rocks, unlike many of the tallest mountains on Lantau Island, such as Lantau Peak, which are formed by Volcanic rocks.

== See also ==
- List of mountains, peaks and hills in Hong Kong
- Mui Wo
