= Pak Ngan Heung =

Village of Hong Kong

Coordinates: 22.271575°N 113.990287°E

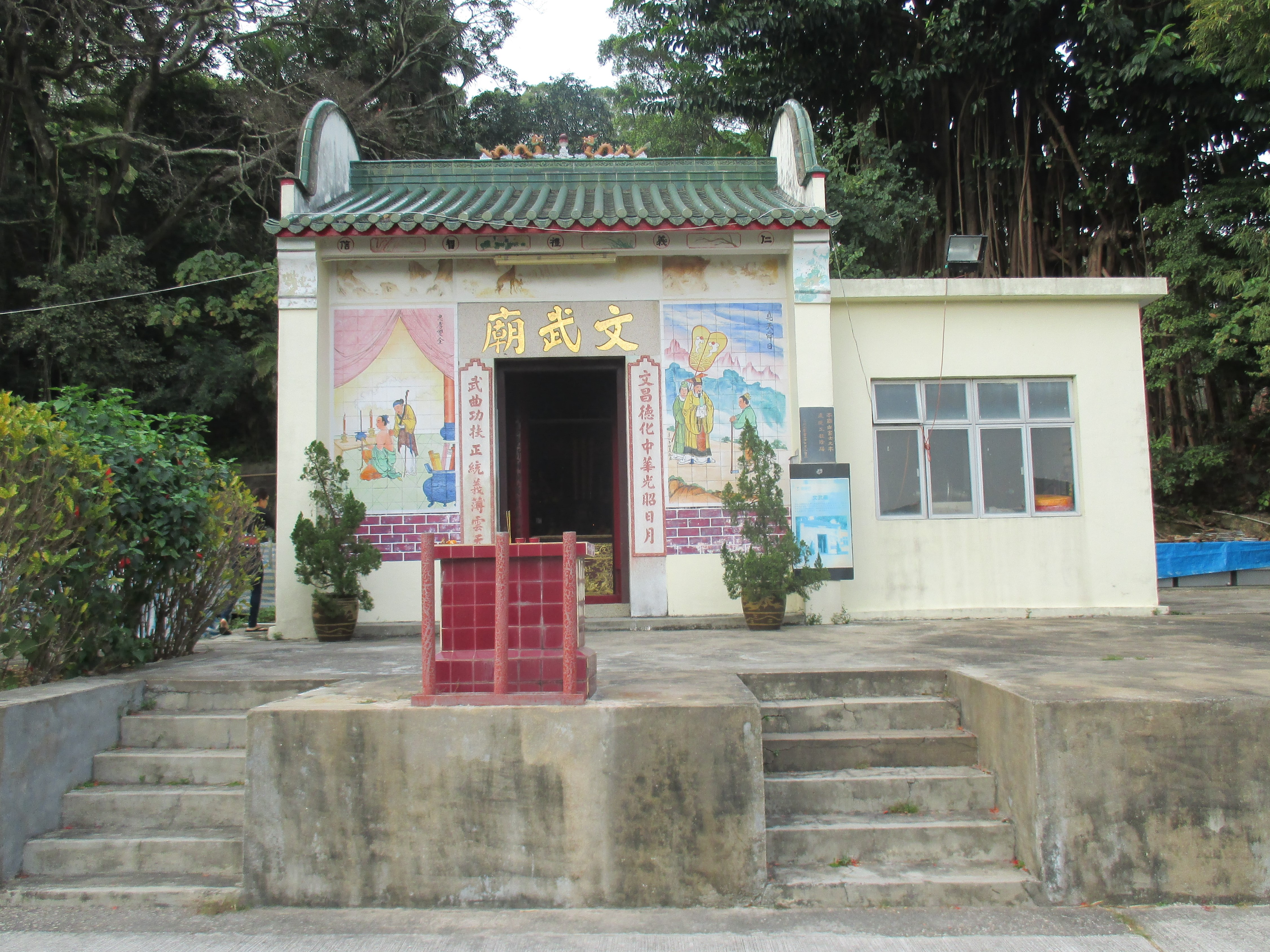
Man Mo Temple in Pak Ngan Heung in 2016.

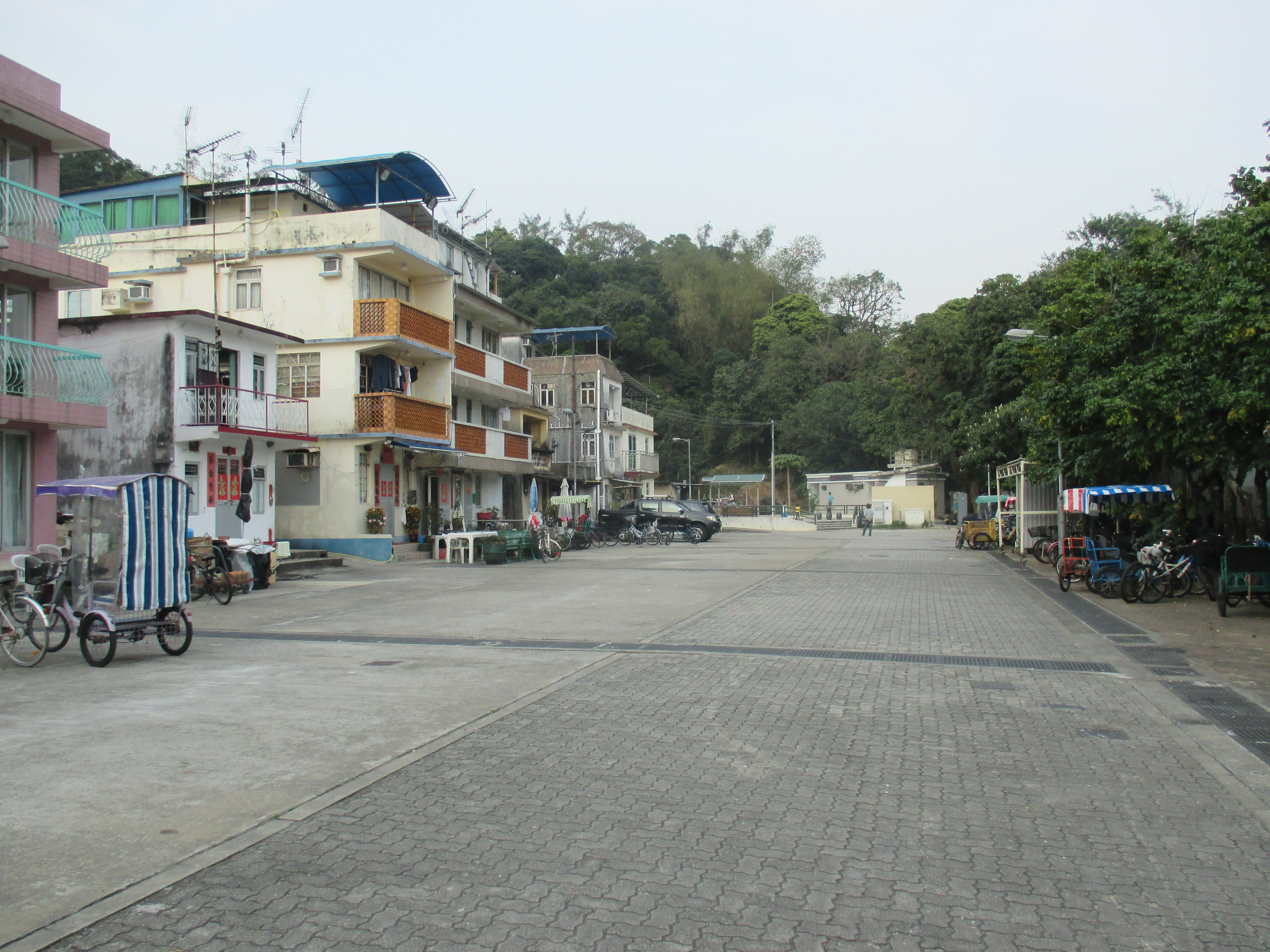
Village square of Pak Ngan Heung in 2016.

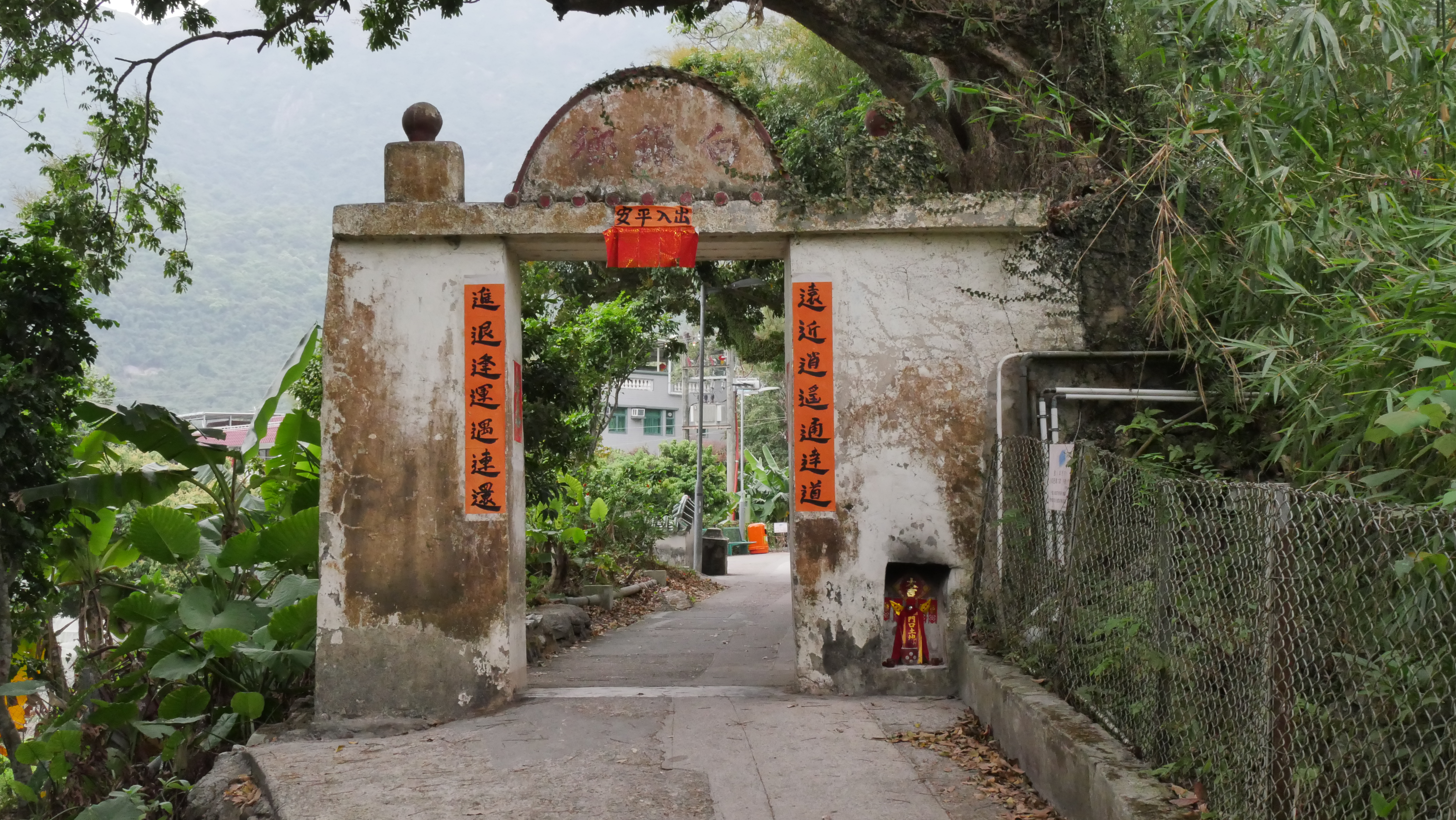
Gate along a road to Pak Ngan Heung.

Pak Ngan Heung (Chinese: 白銀鄉) is a village of Mui Wo, on Lantau Island, Hong Kong.

== Administration ==
Pak Ngan Heung is a recognized village under the New Territories Small House Policy.

== Features ==
A temple dedicated to Man Mo is located in Pak Ngan Heung. Probably built before 1901, it is said to have been originally built during the reign of Wanli, emperor of the Ming dynasty (1573–1620). The temple underwent a major renovation in 1960 and was rebuilt in 2001. It is not a graded historic building.
