= Mui Wo =

Town on Lantau Island, Hong Kong

Mui Wo 梅窩
- Town
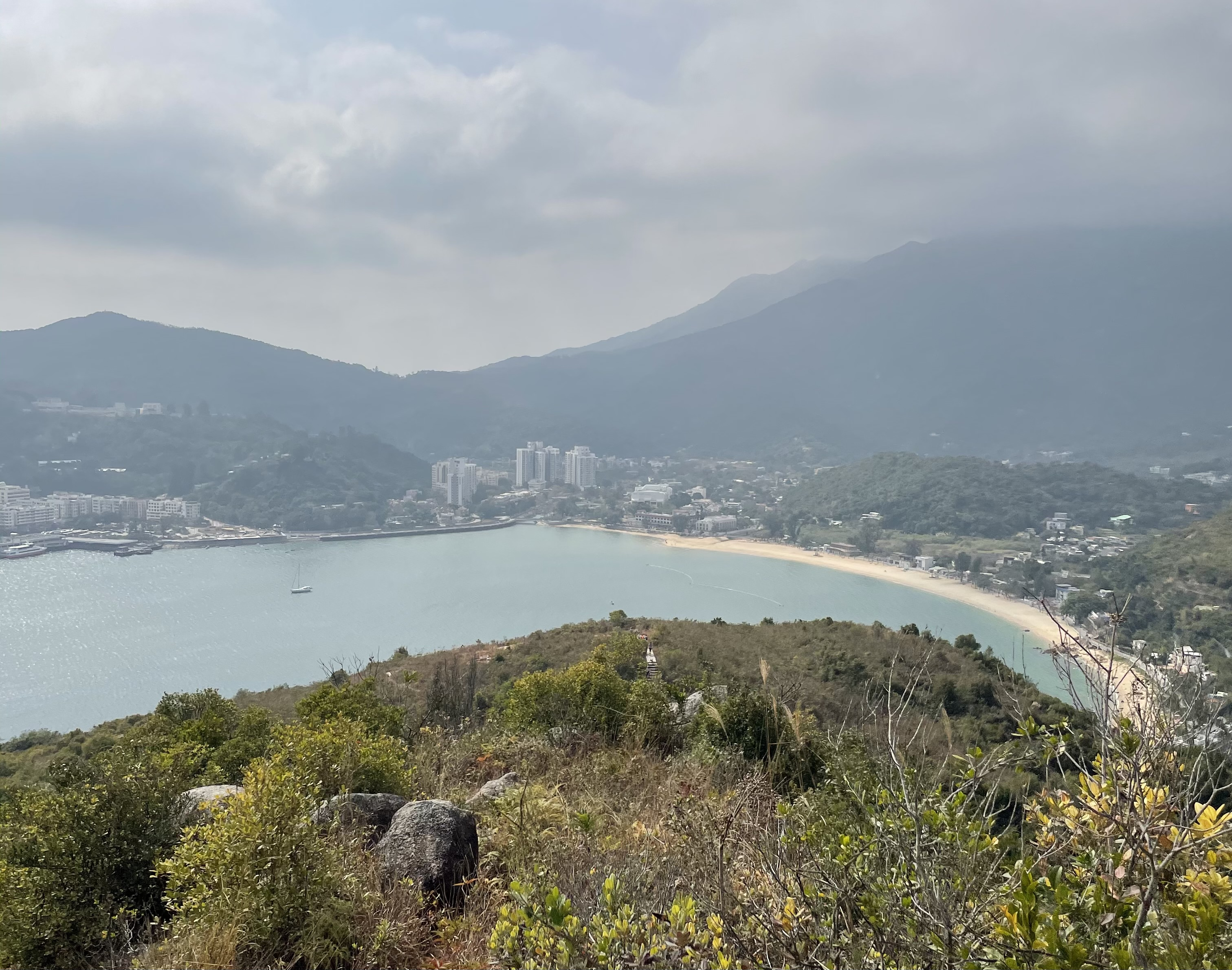
- Mui Wo, as viewed from the hills from the north in 2021
- Interactive map of Mui Wo
- Coordinates: 22°15′52″N 114°00′5″E
- District Council: Islands District

Government
  - Member of the District Council: Randy Yu Hon-kwan (Independent)

Population (2011)
  - Total: 5,485

Mui Wo
- Traditional Chinese: 梅窩
- Simplified Chinese: 梅窝
- Literal meaning: plum nest
Transcriptions
Standard Mandarin
- Hanyu Pinyin: Méi wō
Yue: Cantonese
- Yale Romanization: Mùih wō
- Jyutping: Mui^{4} wo^{1}

Mui Wo is a rural town on the eastern coast of Lantau Island in Hong Kong. The 2011 census recorded 5,485 people living in Mui Wo and its environs.

As early as the 16th century during the Ming dynasty, farmers were already living in Mui Wo Valley. By the 19th century, it had developed into six villages. Mui Wo is located on Silvermine Bay, so named for the silver mines that were once worked along the Silver River (銀河) which flows through the village. The main beach in Mui Wo is known as Silver Mine Bay Beach (銀鑛灣泳灘). The town is known for the feral water buffalos and cows that roam the area.

Prior to the Airport Core Programme and the subsequent development of Tung Chung and North Lantau into a new town, Mui Wo was the principal point for day-trippers setting out to explore Lantau Island. Today, it is still the principal way of reaching South Lantau – from the beaches in Cheung Sha to the fishing village of Tai O and the Tian Tan Buddha. With the opening of Ngong Ping 360 and the new, smoother Tung Chung Road, this may change.

== History ==
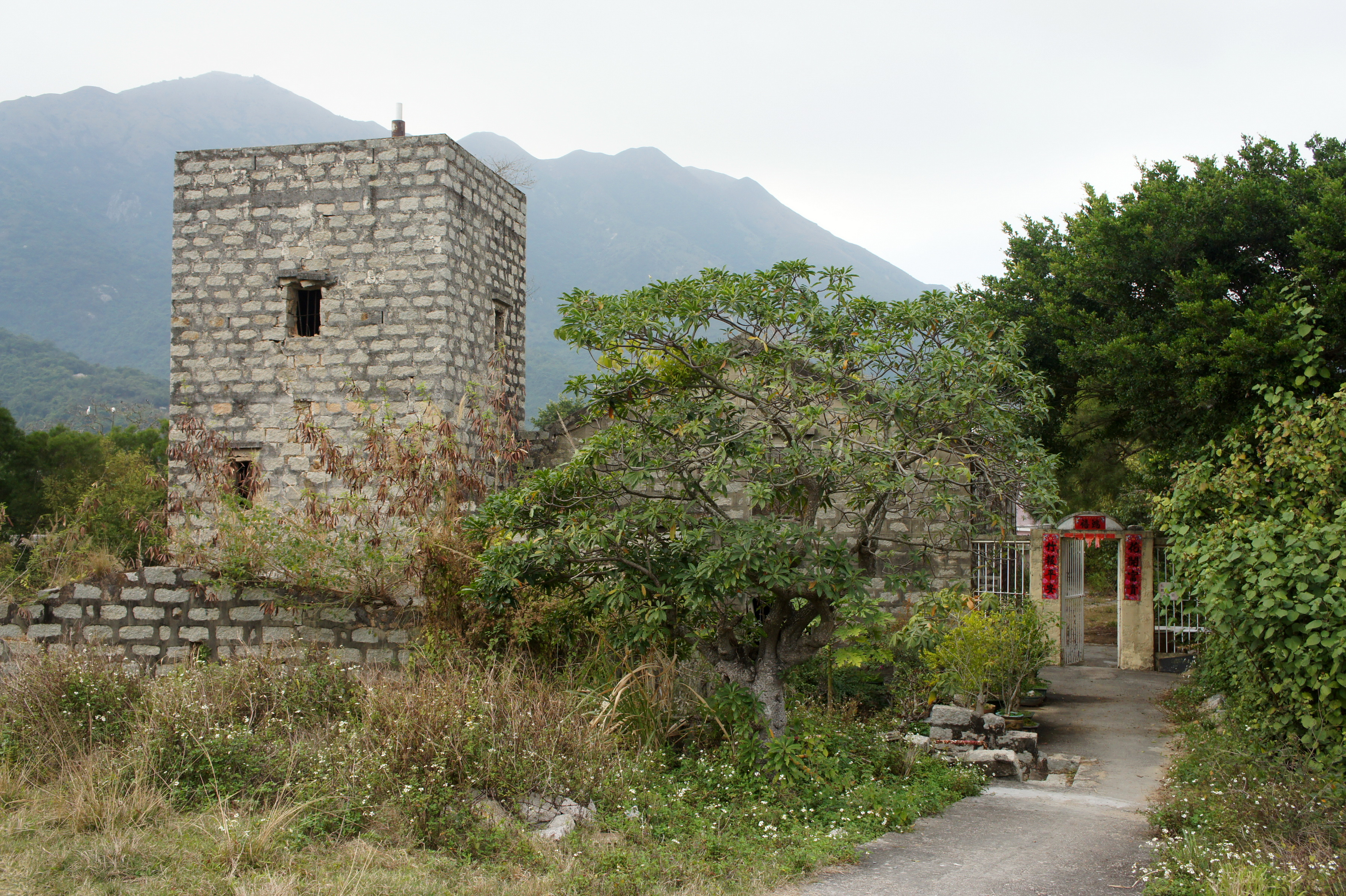
Yuen's Mansion and one of its two watchtowers, in Chung Hau, Mui Wo.

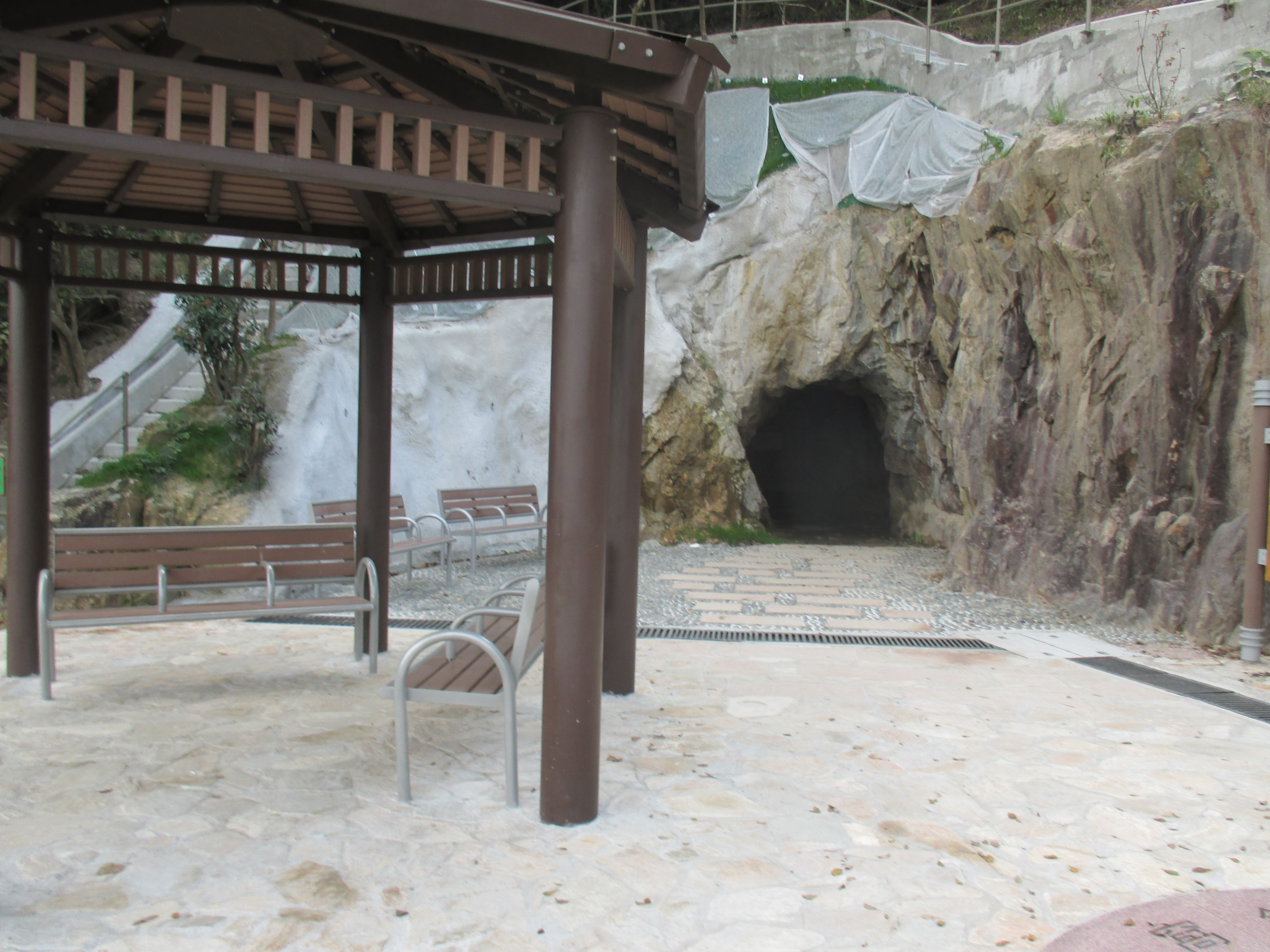
Entrance of Silvermine Cave in 2016

The recorded history of Mui Wo dates back to the last days of the Southern Song dynasty. Fleeing south from the invading Yuan dynasty, in 1277 the Southern Song imperial court sought refuge in Silvermine Bay (at that time known as Mei Yu or 梅蔚). In March 1278, whilst attempting a further escape from the Mongols, the penultimate Song emperor Duanzong fell from a boat and almost drowned. After his rescue, he became ill and died a few months later at Mui Wo. Duanzong's successor, Zhao Bing, was enthroned at Mui Wo on 10 May 1278.

Mui Wo is one of five villages of Lantau that were resettled when the coastal restriction of the Great Clearance was lifted in 1669. The other villages are Tung Sai Chung, Lo Pui O, Shek Pik and Tai O.

=== Mining ===
A silver and lead mine, close to the settlement of Pak Ngan Heung and Sivermine Waterfall, formally opened in March 1886. It had closed by the time China leased the New Territories to Britain in 1898. The main entrance is now called Silvermine Cave. People can only enter the first ten metres or so as the rest of the tunnels have been blocked off for safety reasons, and to prevent disturbance to the rare species of bats who live there.

=== 19–27 August 1945: Mui Wo massacre ===
Japanese soldiers killed at least nine people and arrested 300 Mui Wo villagers in the weeks after Japan surrendered on 15 August 1945, ending the Second World War. Many victims were beaten and tortured. Some were beheaded.

Twelve Japanese soldiers who took part in the massacre were convicted of war crimes in 1946, and three of them hanged. The rest were sentenced to between two and ten years in jail. In their defence, the Japanese soldiers said they had been responding to a guerrilla attack after Japan's capitulation. Their actions were to maintain law and order until they could formally surrender to Allied forces. The judge rejected their arguments, stating that the Mui Wo residents were not responsible for the guerrillas' actions.

== Villages ==
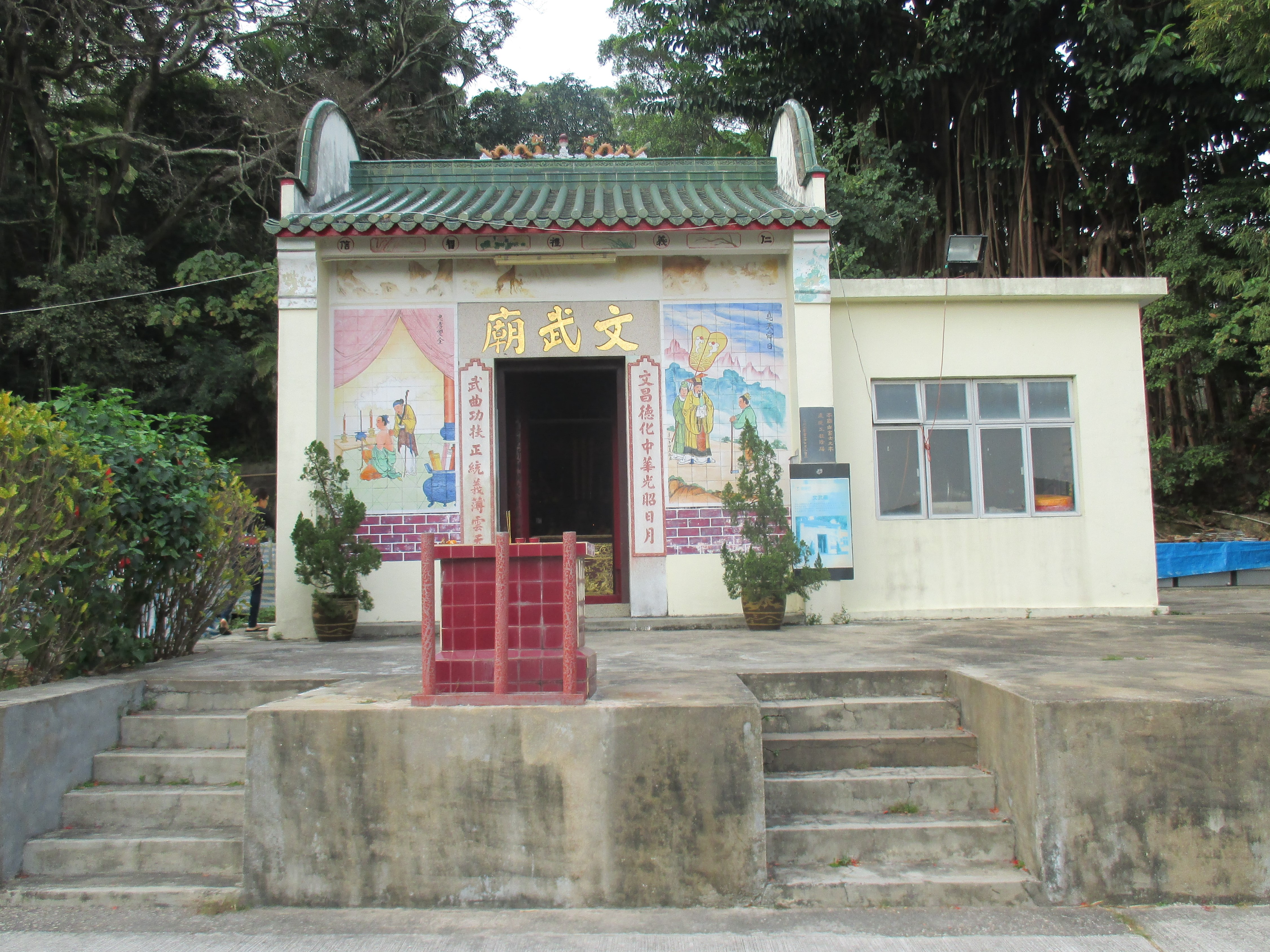
Man Mo Temple in Pak Ngan Heung, Mui Wo.

Villages in the vicinity of Mui Wo include:

- Luk Tei Tong
- Mui Wo Kau Tsuen (梅窩舊村)
- Pak Ngan Heung
- Tai Tei Tong
- Tung Wan Tau (東灣頭)
- Wang Tong (橫塘)
- Wo Tin

== Sights ==
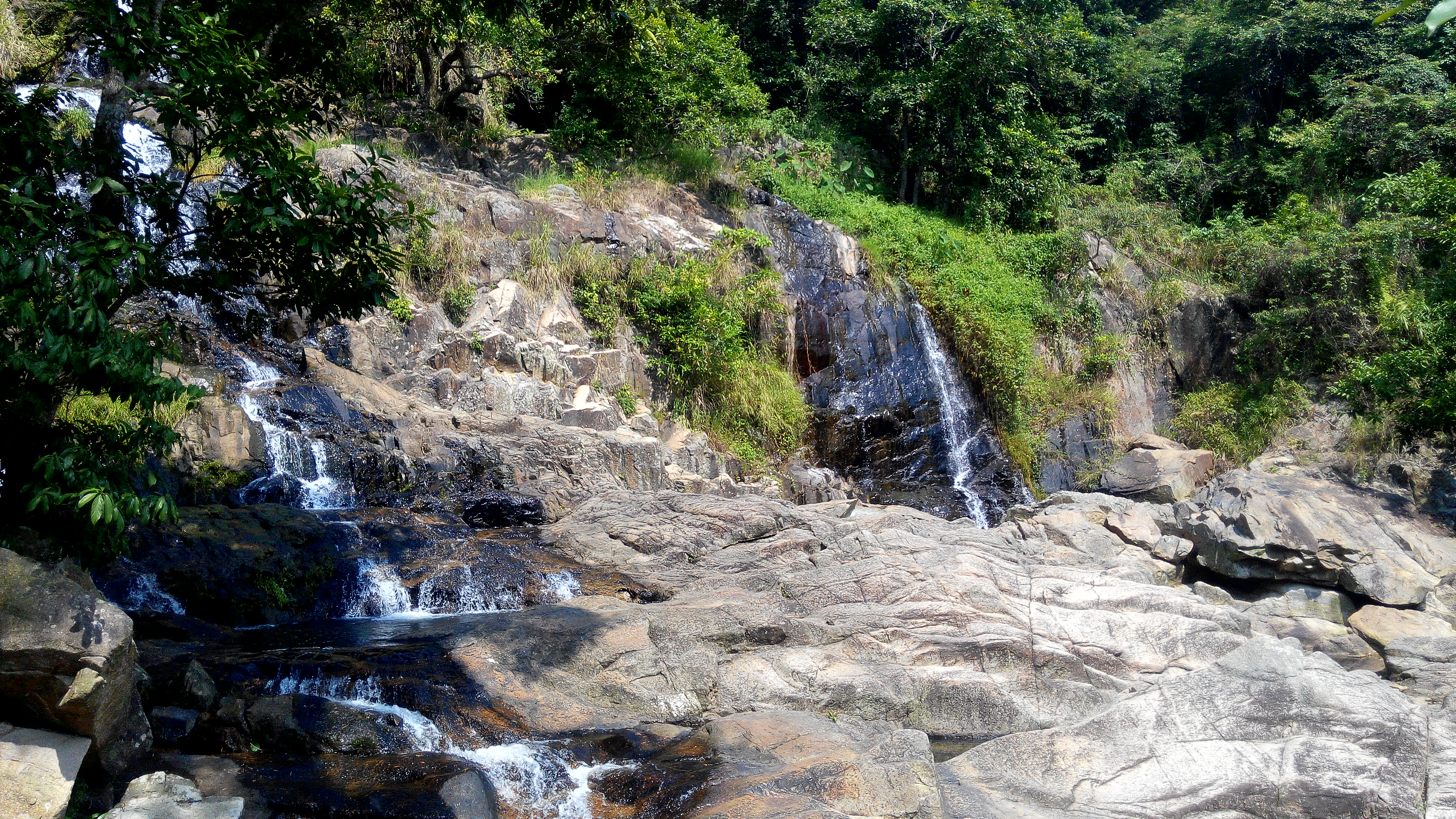
Silver Mine Waterfall

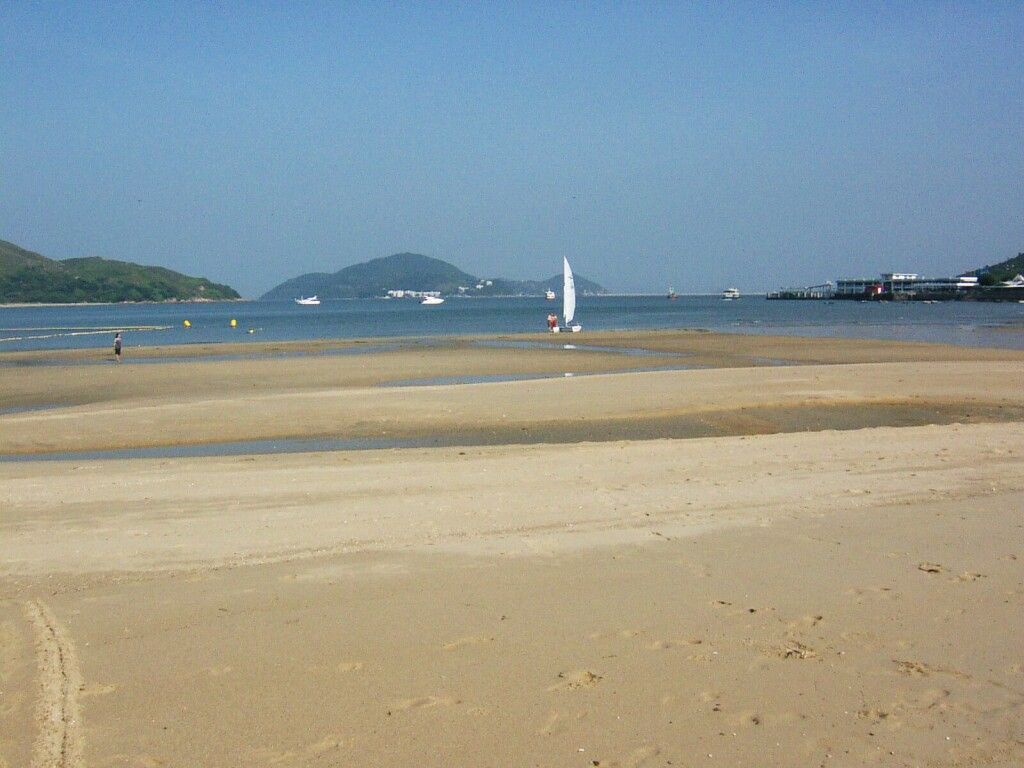
Mui Wo's Silver Mine Bay Beach

Nearby attractions include Silver Mine Bay Beach, Silver Mine Waterfall and a temple dedicated to Man Mo, originally built during the reign of Wanli, emperor of the Ming dynasty (1573–1620). There is a small local museum with old photos of Mui Wo and rural artefacts located behind the Silvermine Bay Resort Hotel. The museum is open only on Wednesday, Saturday and Sunday afternoons.

=== Silver Mine Bay Beach ===
The beach is one of the five gazetted beaches on Lantau. Leisure and Cultural Services Department life guards patrol it and there is a shark net to protect swimmers April through October. There were 69,580 visitors during the seven-month-long official bathing season in 2012—an average of 201 on weekdays and 461 on weekends and public holidays. There were 4,550 visitors on the busiest day, and 16,900 during the busiest month.

Facilities include a fast food kiosk, BBQ pits(24nos), changing room, shower facilities, toilet, family changing room, babycare room and beach volleyball court. There is even a resort nearby.

== Education ==
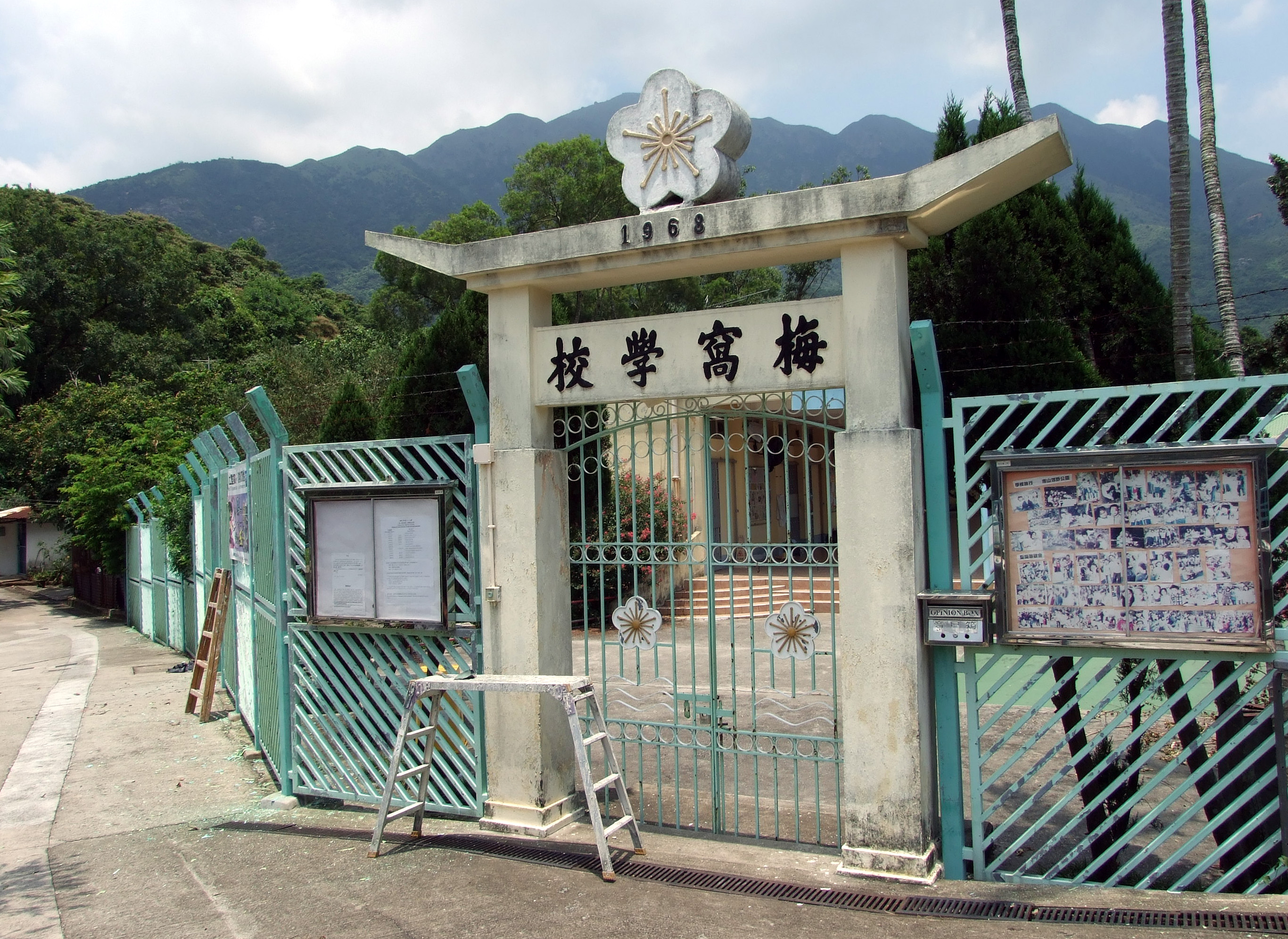
Mui Wo School

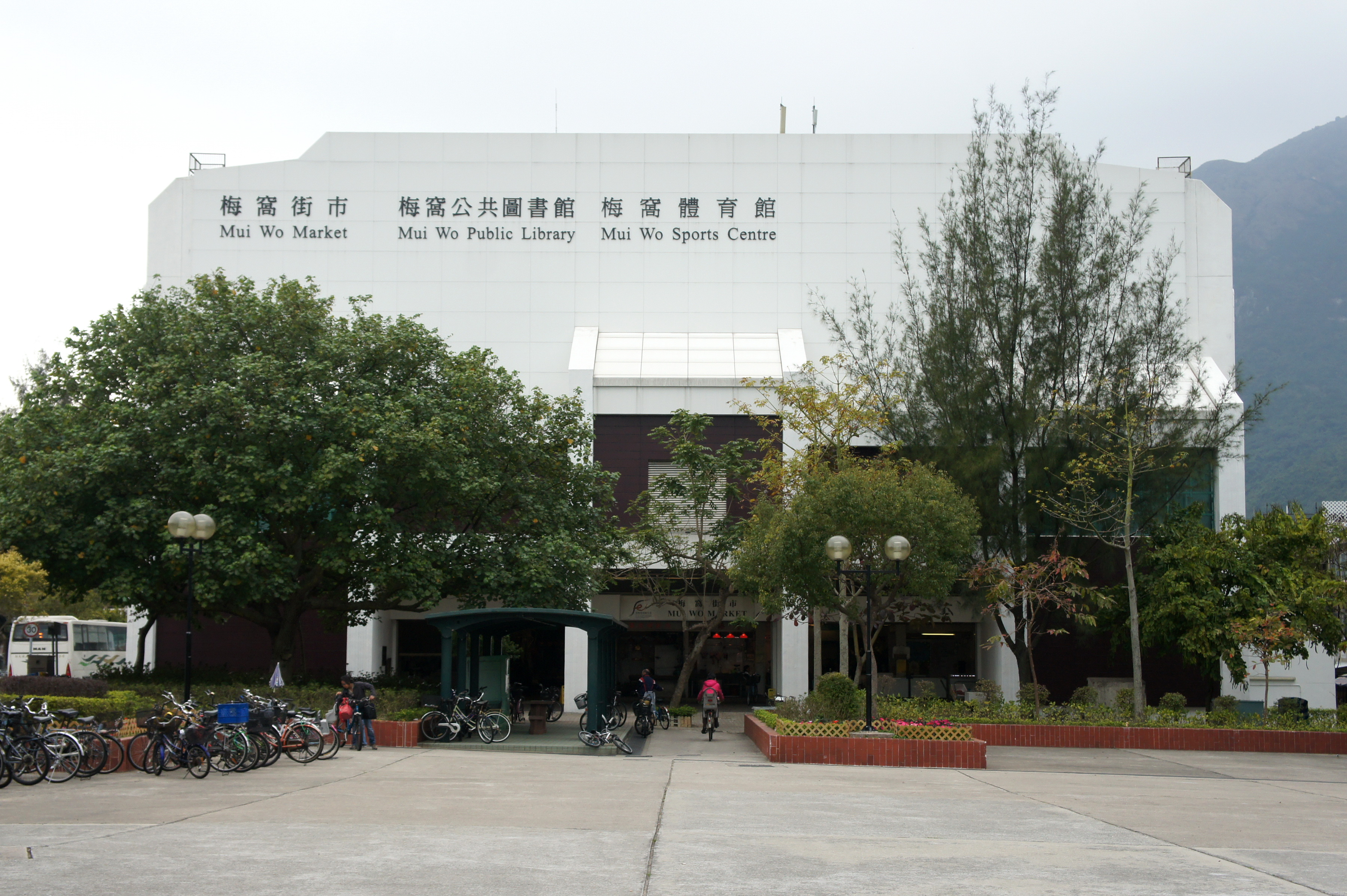
Mui Wo Municipal Services Building includes the Mui Wo Library, Mui Wo Market, and Mui Wo Sports Centre

Most of Lantau Island, including Mui Wo, is in Primary One Admission (POA) School Net 98, which contains multiple aided schools on Lantau Island, including Mui Wo School (梅窩學校); no government primary schools are in this net. Mui Wo Primary School celebrated its 70th anniversary in 2009.

Heung Yee Kuk New Territories South District Secondary School closed in 2007. In 2009, residents protested against and blocked a plan for a rehabilitation centre for drug offenders—the Christian Zheng Sheng College—to take over the site. There is a campaign to reopen the school for local students, but the school was still empty in January 2025. Buddhist Fat Ho Memorial College attempted to obtain the site.

Silvermine Bay School is a private kindergarten and primary school in Mui Wo.

Hong Kong Public Libraries operates Mui Wo Public Library within the Mui Wo Municipal Services Building.

== Future development ==
The First-term Work Report of the Lantau Development Advisory Committee (LanDAC) was released in early 2016. The report proposes a new expressway linking Kennedy Town to Mui Wo, and the development of an "East Lantau Metropolis" at Mui Wo. In all, the report proposes housing up to one million residents on Lantau Island, up from the current figure of approximately 100,000.

== Notable residents ==
The cartoonist Larry Feign, who wrote and drew The World of Lily Wong, lives in Wang Tong (橫塘), a village in Mui Wo.

== In popular culture ==
MIRROR's reality show 'Be a Better MIRROR' by ViuTV is filmed in Mui Wo.

== Transport ==
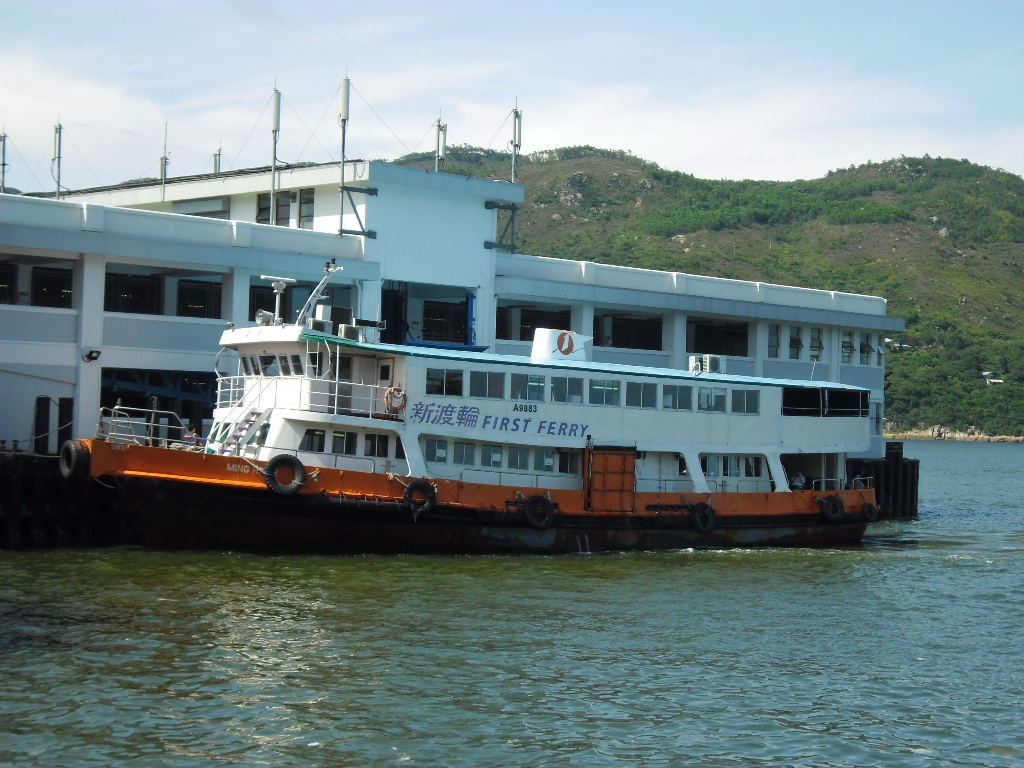
Silvermine Bay Ferry Pier in Mui Wo

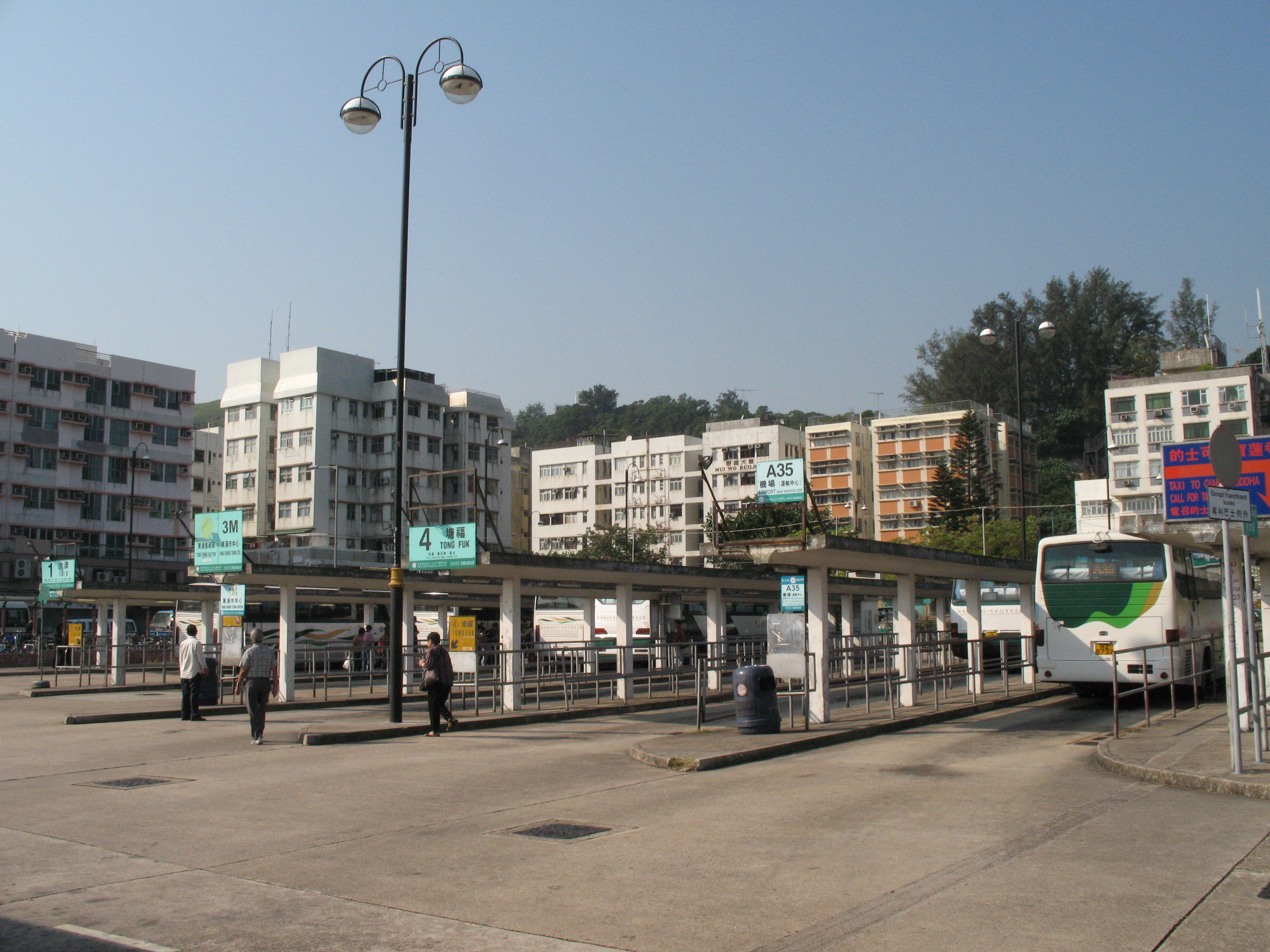
Mui Wo bus terminus

=== Sea ===
Mui Wo is connected by ferry to Central (Central ferry pier number 6). Other ferry services link Mui Wo to Discovery Bay, Peng Chau, Chi Ma Wan and Cheung Chau.

=== Land ===
Buses operate from Mui Wo to other places on Lantau, including Tung Chung (3M) and thus Hong Kong Airport (A35) and the rail network. The major road South Lantau Road begins with Mui Wo and ends in Tai O, with Tung Chung Road branching from Cheung Sha to Tung Chung.

The South Lantau and Tung Chung Roads connect Mui Wo to the rest of Hong Kong's road network. They are closed to private vehicles but local residents and businesses can apply for permits to use them.

Numerous hiking trails lead from Mui Wo to other parts of the island. The long hiking trail on the island, Lantau Trail, starts from Mui Wo. A much-frequented route leads north-east from Mui Wo to Discovery Bay via a pagoda, the Trappist Haven Monastery, and then either up the mountain via the Discovery Bay golf course or by the ocean via Nim Shue Wan.

=== Air ===
The Hong Kong Air Cadet Corps operate a helipad at the end of Mui Wo Ferry Pier Road that is close to the sewage plant.

== Parks and recreation ==
The Mui Wo Sports Centre is in the Mui Wo Municipal Services Building, operated by the Leisure and Cultural Services Department. It began operations in August 1993.

== See also ==
- List of places in Hong Kong
