= Place names of Hong Kong =

The generic forms of Hong Kong place names are mainly Cantonese, Hakka and British English, although other languages also contribute to Hong Kong place names.

The majority of generic forms are suffix such as Chung in Kwai Chung. Some indicators of ordering and direction could be as prefixes, for example, Tai Pai (大白, lit. first white), Yi Pai (二白, second white).

== Changes in place names ==
It is common practice in Cantonese communities to change and swap Chinese characters of similar pronunciations because of misinterpretation by different ruling governments over time or visitors from foreign villages and cities, illiteracy of local villages before the economic boom, seeking of good fortune and to replace 'bad sounding' words by using characters with a more positive meaning.

== List of generic names ==
=== Indigenous ===
Name	Character	Meaning
Am, Ngam	岩	rock, rock face, crag
Au	坳 or 凹	mountain pass
Chai/Tsai	仔	small/minor, word suffix indicating a diminutive.
Chai	寨	defensed village
Chau	洲	islet, island
Che	輋	place near hill/mountain
Chung	涌	estuarial lagoon at mouth or confluence of stream, stream
Ha	下	lower
Hang	坑	valley
Hau	口	opening
Heung	鄉	village, rural area
Ho	河	river
Hoi	海	sea
Hom	磡	pillar, mill-stone
Hui	墟	market, locality within a town
Kai	街	street
Kan	澗	stream
Kap	甲	something that sticks out, bulge, appendage.
Kau	滘	basin
Kiu	橋	bridge
Ko Tan	高灘	elevated plain
Kok	角	point (of land), horn, angle
Kuk	谷	valley
Lam	林	wood or forest
Leng/Ling	嶺	hill-top, ridge
Long		narrow elongated valley between hills
Lo Wai	老圍	old walled village
Mei	尾	tail (of a place)
Mun	門	door/gate, opening, channel
O	澳	cove, small bay or harbour
Pai	排	slab (of rock), (rocky) reef.
Pik	壁	cliff
Ping	坪	plain
Po	埗	pier
Po	埔	plain (?)
Pun	盤	basin
San Tsuen	新村	new village
Sha	沙	sand, sandy beach, sandy cay or shoal
Shan	山	hill, mountain, mountainous island/islet
Shek	石	rock
Sheung	上	upper
Shing	城	walled city
Shui	水	water, stream
Tam	潭	pool
Tan	灘	beach or shallow band
Tau	頭	head (of a place)
Tei	地	land, place
Tin	田	field (flooded or dry)
To	島	island
To	肚	valley
Tong	塘	pond, plain
Tong	堂	hall
Tun	墩	small (usually rounded) hill
Tung	洞	cave (and ?)
Tung	峒	
Tsim	尖	sharp, sharp peak
Tsui	咀/嘴	pointed headland
Tsuen	村	village
Tuk	篤	the very end (of a place)
Wai	圍	walled village
Wan	灣	bay
Wan	環	district
Wo	窩	basin, hollow, coombe
Yiu	窰	kiln

=== English ===
Most common Chinese translation in brackets.

- Bay (灣)
- Cove (澳)
- Harbour (港)
- Haven (港)
- Hill (山)
- Mount (山)
- Peak (山)
- Praya (海灘)

=== Modern ===
Most common Chinese translation in brackets.

- Centre (中心)
- Court (苑)
- Estate (邨)
- Plaza (廣場)
- Shopping centre (商場)

== See also ==
- Origins of names of cities and towns in Hong Kong
- List of generic forms in place names in Great Britain and Ireland
