= Luk Tei Tong =

Village of Hong Kong

Coordinates: 22.262916°N 113.991614°E

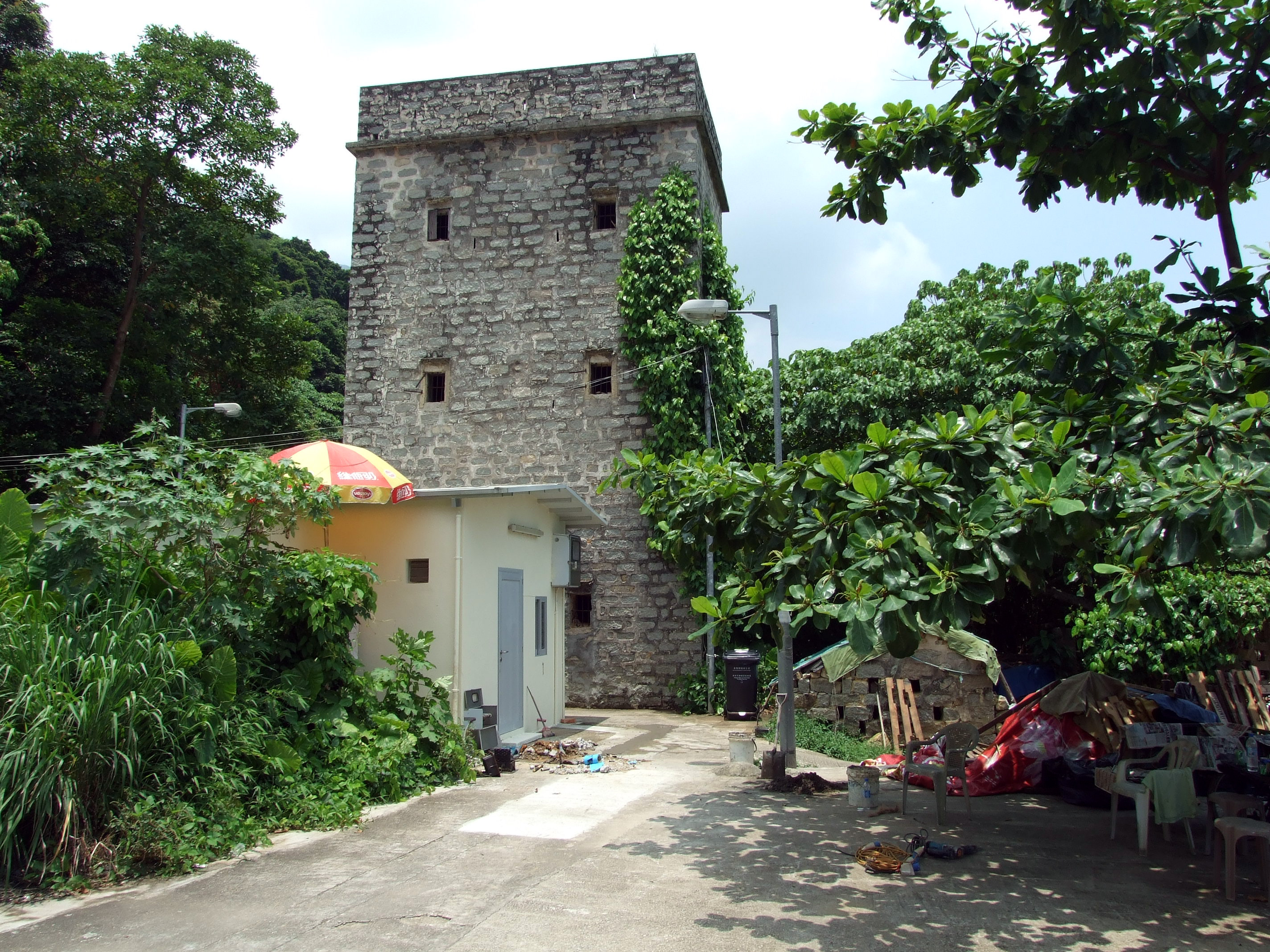
Luk Tei Tong Watchtower.

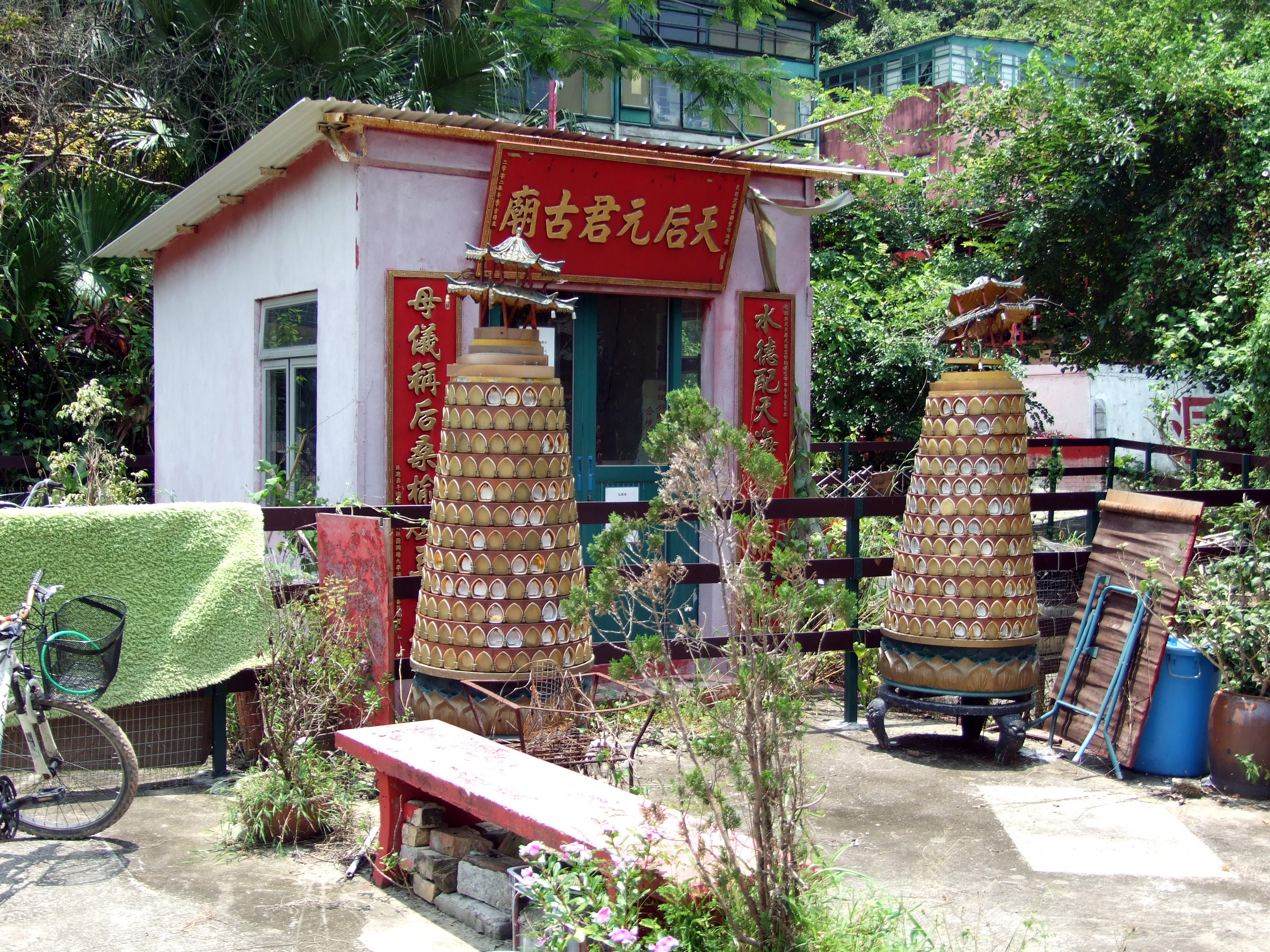
Tin Hau Temple in Luk Tei Tong.

Luk Tei Tong (Chinese: 鹿地塘) is a village of Mui Wo, on Lantau Island, Hong Kong.

== Administration ==
Luk Tei Tong is a recognized village under the New Territories Small House Policy.

== History ==
At the time of the 1911 census, the population of Luk Tei Tong was 76. The number of males was 23.

== Features ==
Luk Tei Tong is known for the Luk Tei Tong watchtower, which is listed as a Grade 3 Historic Building. It is said to have been built for protection against bandits and its date of construction has been stated as roughly 1930 or roughly 1942.
