= Wo Tin =

Coordinates: 22.274284°N 113.989565°E

Wo Tin (Chinese: 窩田) is a village of Mui Wo, on Lantau Island, Hong Kong.

== Location ==
Wo Tin is located in the vicinity of Silvermine Cave in Mui Wo.
