= Tai Tei Tong =

Village of Hong Kong

Coordinates: 22.267634°N 113.99076°E

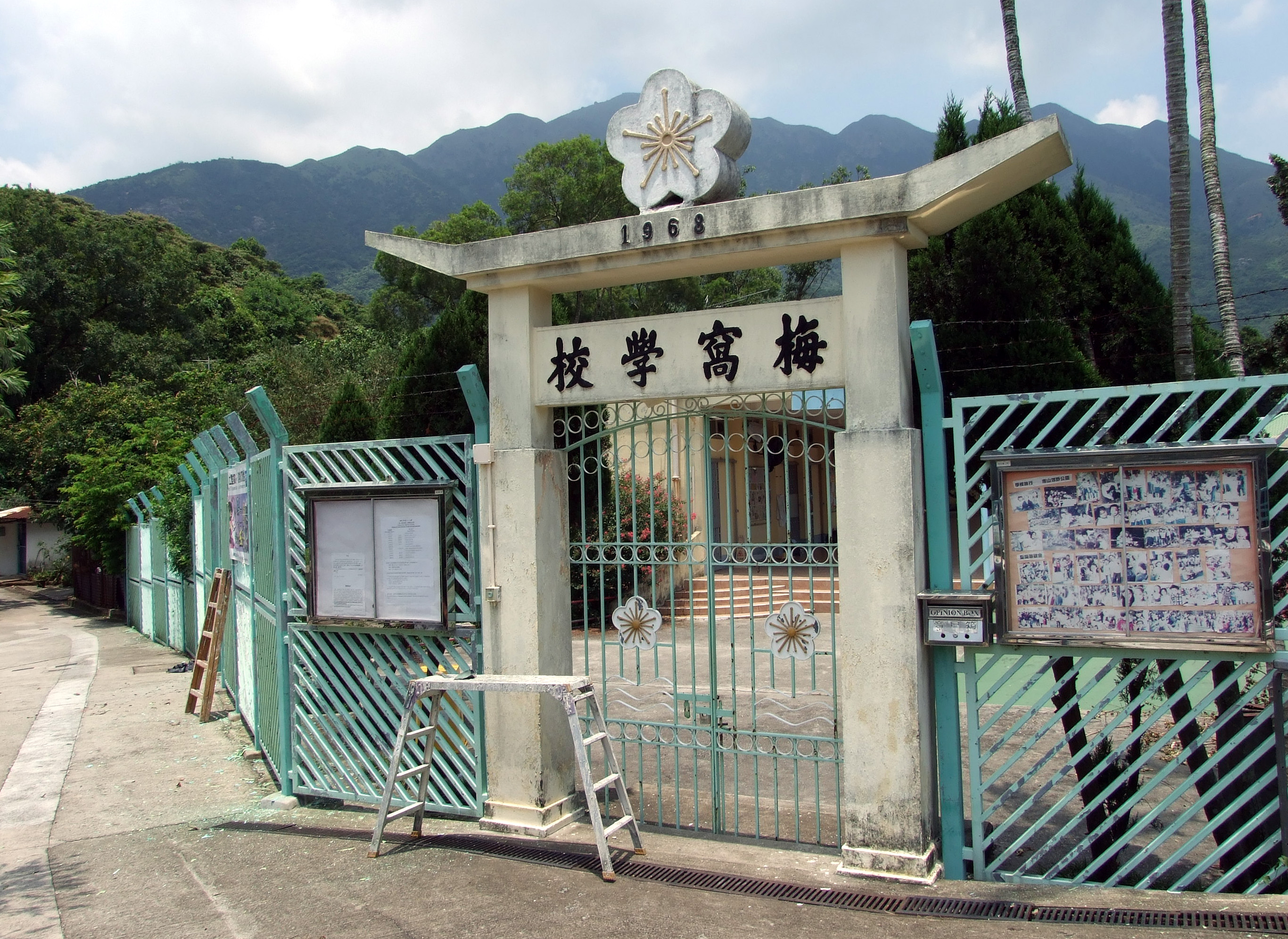
Mui Wo School in Tai Tei Tong.

Tai Tei Tong (Chinese: 大地塘) is a village of Mui Wo, on Lantau Island, Hong Kong.

== Administration ==
Tai Tei Tong is a recognized village under the New Territories Small House Policy.
