= Larry Feign =

Cartoonist

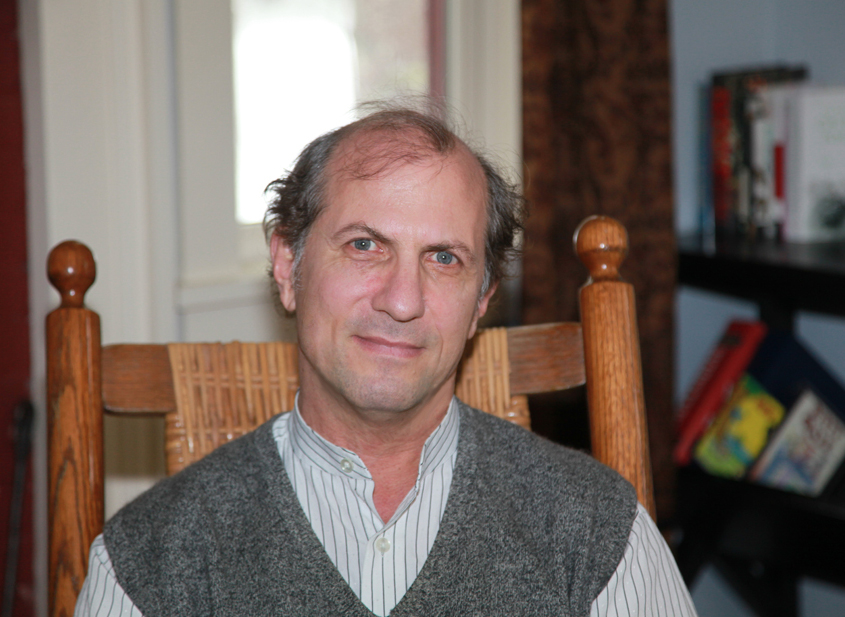
- Feign at the MacDowell art colony in 2011
- Born: December 5, 1955 (age 70) Buffalo, New York, US
- Areas: Cartoonist, Writer
- Notable works: The World of Lily Wong

Larry Feign (born December 5, 1955) is an American cartoonist and writer based in Hong Kong. Feign is best known for his comic strip The World of Lily Wong.

== Education and early career ==
Feign is from Buffalo, New York.

He attended the University of California, Berkeley and Goddard College in Plainfield, Vermont, graduating with a B.A. in 1979, and received an MFA in Creative Writing from Pacific University in Forest Grove, Oregon in 2012.

His earliest comic-strip character was known as "Hoiman the Mouse", which he created as the mascot for Dum, a mimeographed magazine produced a few times per year with several collaborators in primary school. Later he co-created a strip called "Billy Wizard", which began as a collaboration in high school with Jon Tschirgi. He and Tschirgi also formed a rock band which released one LP record in 1976 under the name The B. Toff Band, and a 45 rpm single in 1978 under the name Billy Wizard.

Feign started cartooning professionally in 1980 in Honolulu, where he worked as a caricature artist in the International Marketplace. In 1983, he moved to Los Angeles and worked for the animation studio DIC Productions as a storyboard artist for the "Heathcliff the Cat" animated television series.

== Move to Hong Kong ==
In 1985, he moved to Hong Kong, where he created a feature called "Aieeyaaa!", a satirical Chinese-word-a-day single-panel cartoon, which ran daily in the Hongkong Standard for one year. He terminated the feature when he started producing The World of Lily Wong for the same newspaper. Feign, who speaks Cantonese, was described as more integrated into Hong Kong than many other expatriates by the New York Times.

The World of Lily Wong appeared in The Standard from November 1986 to December 1987; the South China Morning Post between January 1987 and May 1995; The Independent (UK) between March 1997 and June 1997 (to chronicle the final hundred days of British rule in Hong Kong); and the HK iMail from May 2000 until September 2001. In July 1997, Lily Wong appeared in a special Hong Kong handover edition of Time magazine, the first full-page cartoon editorial in the magazine's history. Lily Wong also appeared in syndication in Malaysia's New Straits Times from 1991 to 1998, and individually in numerous periodicals and books around the world. The strip gained considerable popularity - the New York Times described Feign as "the colony's premier political cartoonist" in 1990.

The abrupt cancellation of Lily Wong by the South China Morning Post in May 1995, following a series of cartoons deemed offensive to the Beijing leadership, garnered international attention as the most high-profile case of media self-censorship in the years preceding Hong Kong's handover to the People's Republic of China. Letters to the editor written by then Democrat leader Martin Lee and others were never published.

== Later career ==
From 1998 to 2000 Feign lived in London, where he produced a weekly political comic strip for Time magazine's international editions, as well as a comic strip known as The Royals, satirizing the antics of the British royal family. He also illustrated for The Economist, Fortune, and other publications.

Feign's work has received several awards, including Best Cartoonist from the Newspaper Society of Hong Kong, three Human Rights Press Awards from Amnesty International, and others for his animation work. In 2011, Feign received a literature fellowship from the MacDowell Colony in Peterborough, New Hampshire.

From 2018 to 2019, Feign documented his trouble with peripheral neuropathy that affected his drawing ability in a weblog.

Feign has also produced animation for Walt Disney Television and the Cartoon Network.

A novel by Feign based on the life of Zheng Yi Sao, The Flower Boat Girl, was published in 2021.

Feign lives in Hong Kong. He is married to psychologist and author Dr. Cathy Tsang-Feign.

== Books ==
- The Village at the Center of the World (2023) ISBN 978-988-8843-10-7.
- The Flower Boat Girl (2021) ISBN 978-962-7866-55-8.
- A Politically Incorrect History of Hong Kong (2017) ISBN 978-962-7866-25-1.
- Let's All Shut Up & Make Money! 20th Anniversary Edition (2017) ISBN 978-962-7866-24-4.
- Aieeyaaa! Learn Chinese the Hard Way (2015) ISBN 978-962-7866-20-6.
- Aieeyaaa! 2008 Cantonese version (2008) ISBN 978-988-17-5548-3.
- Hongkongitis (2007) ISBN 988-99565-0-0.
- Attack of the Diced Chicken (2003) ISBN 978-962-7866-15-2.
- The Royals (2000)
- Let's All Shut Up And Make Money (1997) ISBN 978-962-7866-13-8.
- Aieeyaaa! I'm Pregnant! (1996) ISBN 978-962-7866-12-1.
- Banned in Hong Kong (1995) ISBN 978-962-7866-09-1.
- Hong Kong Fairy Tales (1994) ISBN 978-962-7866-08-4.
- Execute Yourself Tonite! (with Nury Vittachi) (1993) ISBN 962-1001-51-X.
- How The Animals Do It (1992) ISBN 978-962-7866-17-6.
- Postcards from Lily Wong (1990) ISBN 978-962-7866-06-0.
- The Adventures of Superlily (1989) ISBN 978-962-7866-05-3.
- Quotations From Lily Wong (1989) ISBN 978-962-7866-04-6.
- The World of Lily Wong (1988) ISBN 978-962-7866-03-9.
- Aieeyaaa! Not Again! (1987) ISBN 978-962-7866-02-2.
- Aieeyaaa! (1986) ISBN 978-962-7866-01-5.
