= The World of Lily Wong =

Comic strip

The World of Lily Wong was a comic strip by Larry Feign (an American-born Hong Kong resident) which began in 1986, running until 2001. During its early years, it was featured in several newspapers including The Standard and the South China Morning Post between November 1986 and May 1995; The Independent (UK) between March 1997 and June 1997 (to chronicle the last hundred days of British rule in Hong Kong); and the HK iMail from May 2000 until September 2001. It was revived in a Cantonese edition from October 2007 to March 2008.

The strip followed its eponymous protagonist, Lily Wong, a young Chinese woman in Hong Kong (during its time as a British colony). Her parents, her naughty brother Rudy and her gwailo husband were often used for commenting on Hong Kong news and for comparison of East and West in terms of both culture and politics.

The criticism of abuses by the People's Republic of China earned Feign prizes from Amnesty International in 1996 and 1997. However, Larry Feign's political dialogue in the Lily Wong comics caused mainland-influenced media outlets to shun him. Although the South China Morning Post claimed its cancellation of the strip in May 1995 was a normal editorial decision, it was widely seen in Hong Kong and elsewhere as self-censorship by the paper in order not to jeopardise the business interests in China of its owner, Robert Kuok, and consequently made headlines around the world.
