= Man Mo temples in Hong Kong =

Coordinates: 22.283982°N 114.150239°E

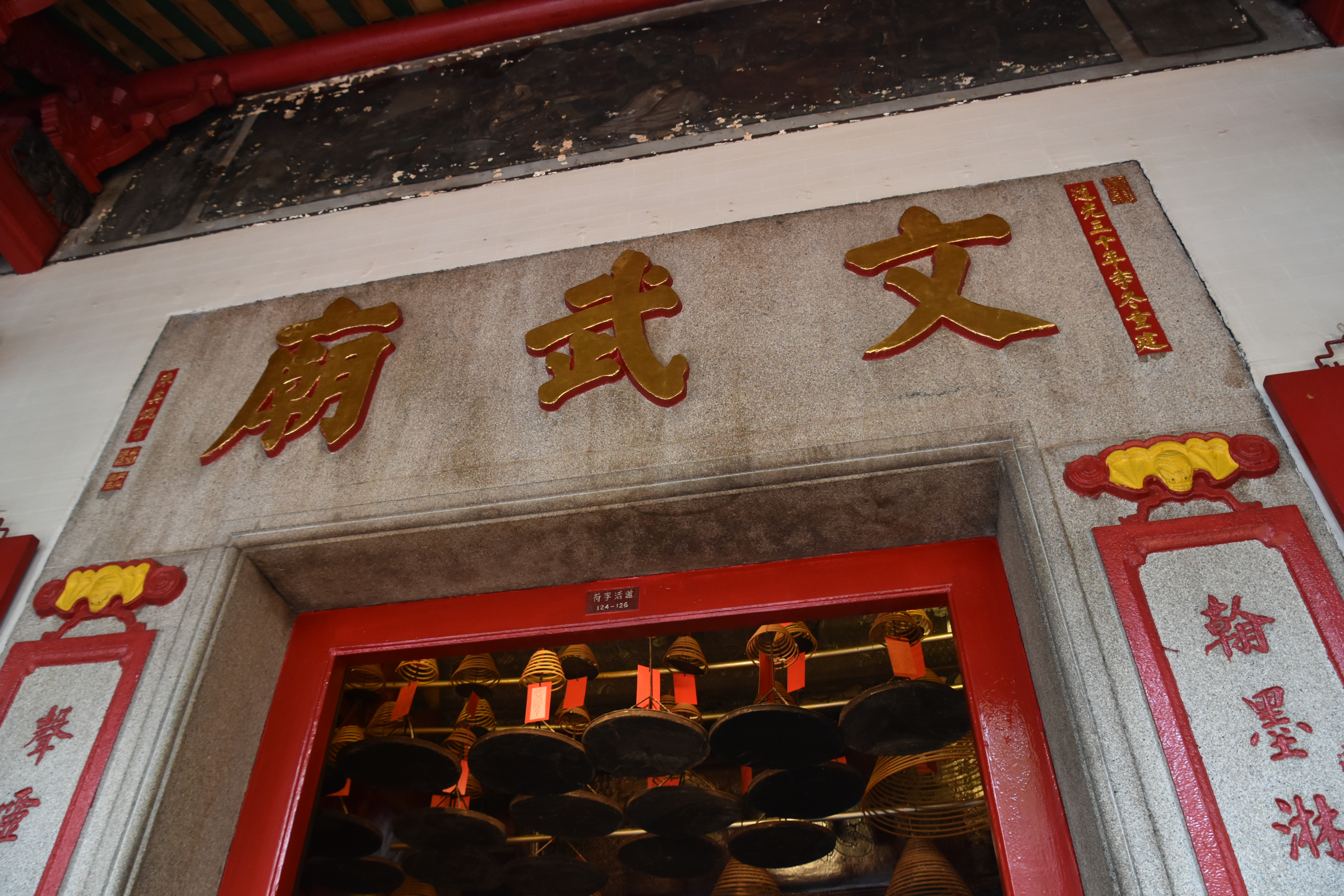
- Entrance of Man Mo Temple, Hollywood Road
- Traditional Chinese: 文武廟
- Simplified Chinese: 文武庙
Transcriptions
Standard Mandarin
- Hanyu Pinyin: Wénwǔmiào
Yue: Cantonese
- Yale Romanization: Màhn móuh míu
- Jyutping: Man4 mou5 miu6
- Sidney Lau: man^{4} mo^{5} miu^{6}

A Man Mo temple, or Man Mo Miu, is a temple dedicated to the Chinese folk god of literature, Man Tai (文帝), or Man Cheong (文昌), and the martial god Mo Tai (武帝), or Kwan Tai (關帝). The two deities were commonly patronized by scholars and students seeking progress in their study or ranking in the civil examinations in the Ming and Qing dynasties. There are several Man Mo temples in Hong Kong, the best-known of which is the one in Sheung Wan.

== Sheung Wan ==
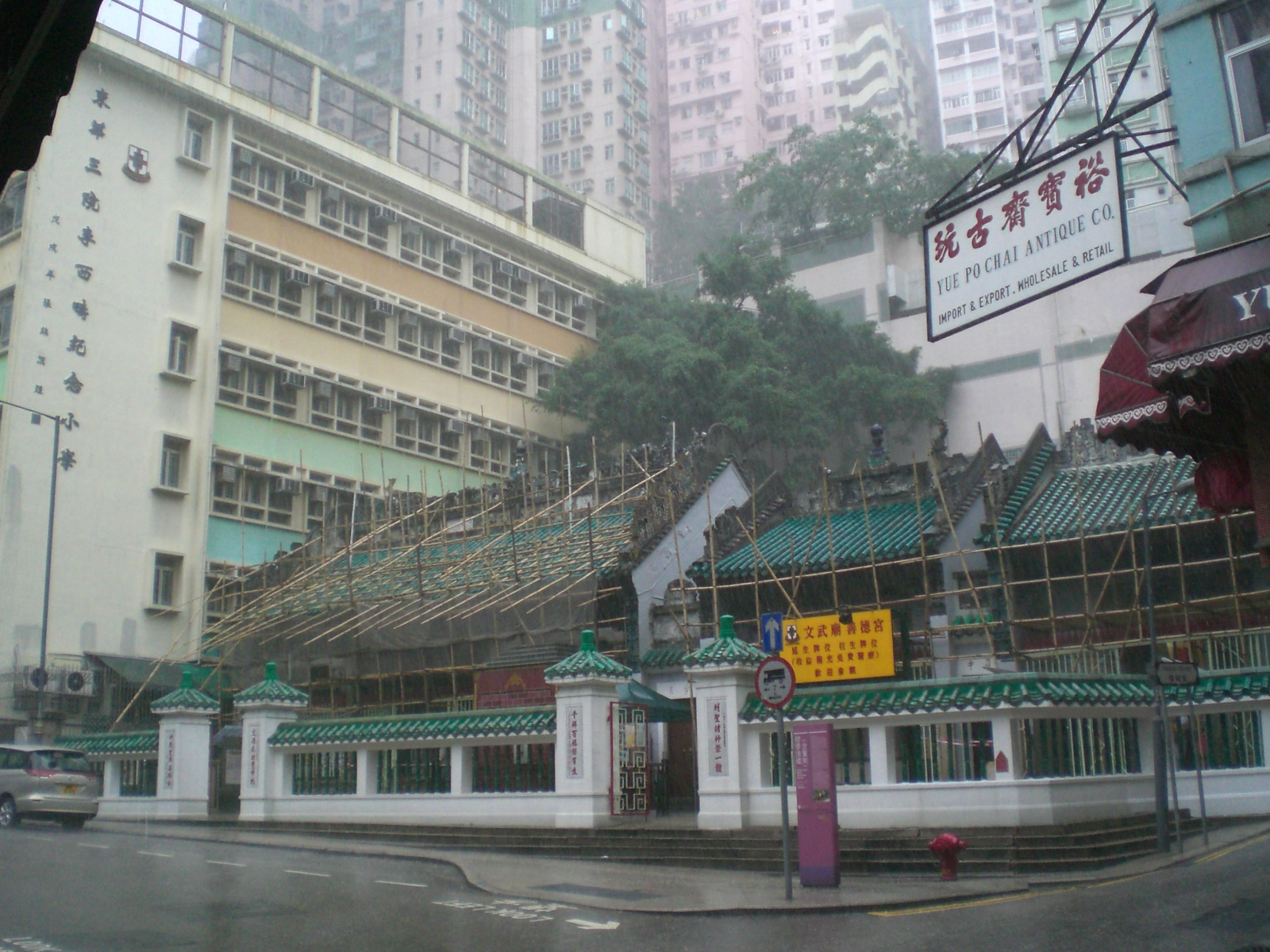
Man Mo Temple complex, Hollywood Road. From left to right: Man Mo Temple, Lit Shing Temple, Kung So.

The largest Man Mo temple in Hong Kong is at 124–126 Hollywood Road, in Sheung Wan, built in 1847. It is part of a complex that comprises three adjacent blocks: Man Mo Temple, Lit Shing Temple (No. 128 Hollywood Road), and Kung So.

The Man Mo Temple, the main building of the complex, is dedicated to the civil god Man Cheong and the martial god Kwan Tai. Lit Shing Kung (列聖宫) is for the worship of all heavenly gods. Kung So (公所), to its west, was an assembly hall where community affairs and disputes were settled.

In 1908, the temple was officially entrusted to the Tung Wah Board of Directors. The temple has since been managed by the Tung Wah Group of Hospitals. It was graded as a Grade I historic building in 1993, and it is now a declared monument.

== Tai Po ==
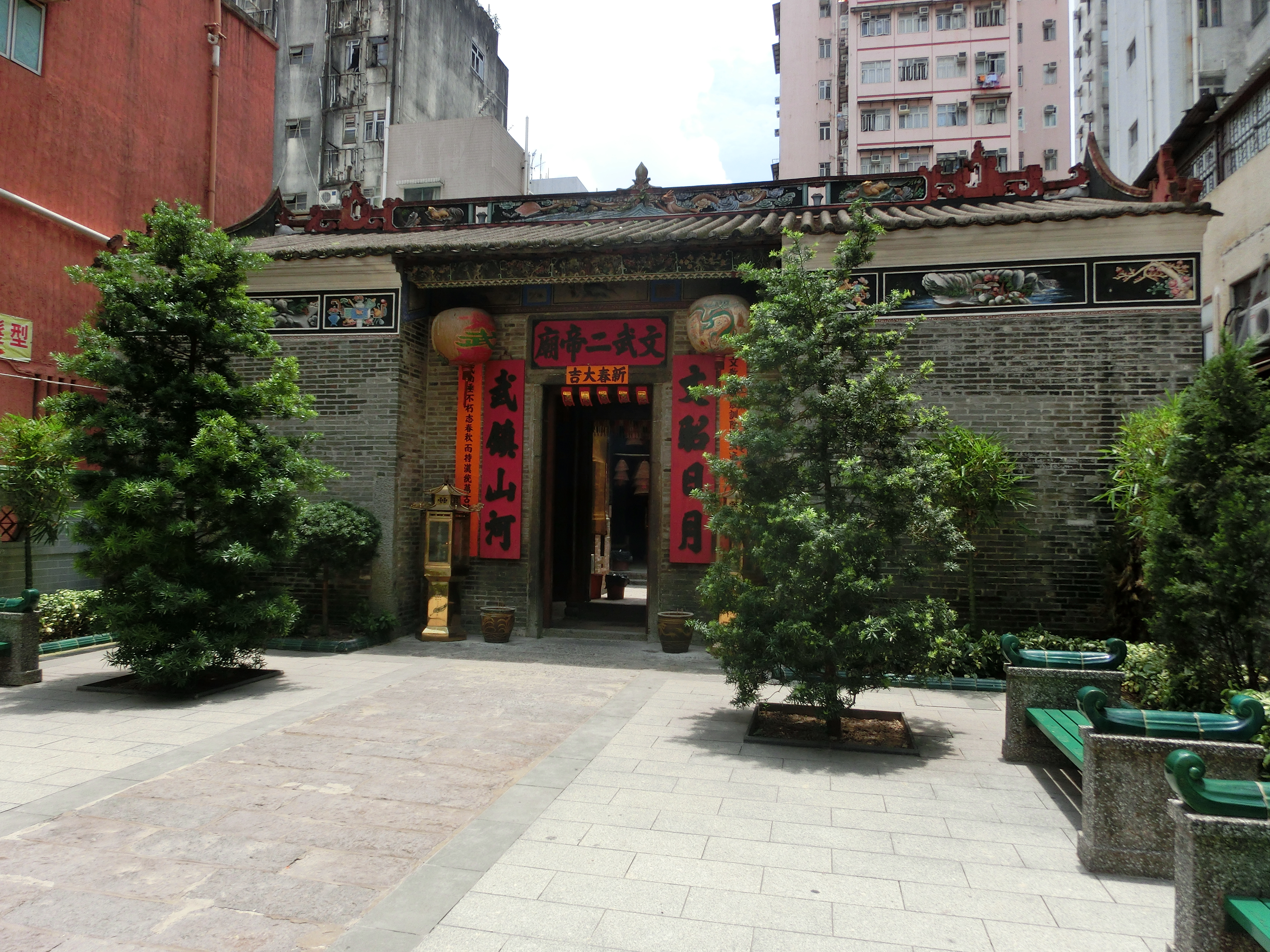
Man Mo Temple, Tai Po

The Man Mo Temple on Fu Shin Street (富善街), Tai Po, was built in 1893, to mark the founding of Tai Wo Shi (Tai Wo Market Town, now commonly known as Tai Po Market). It has been listed as a declared monument.

== Lantau ==
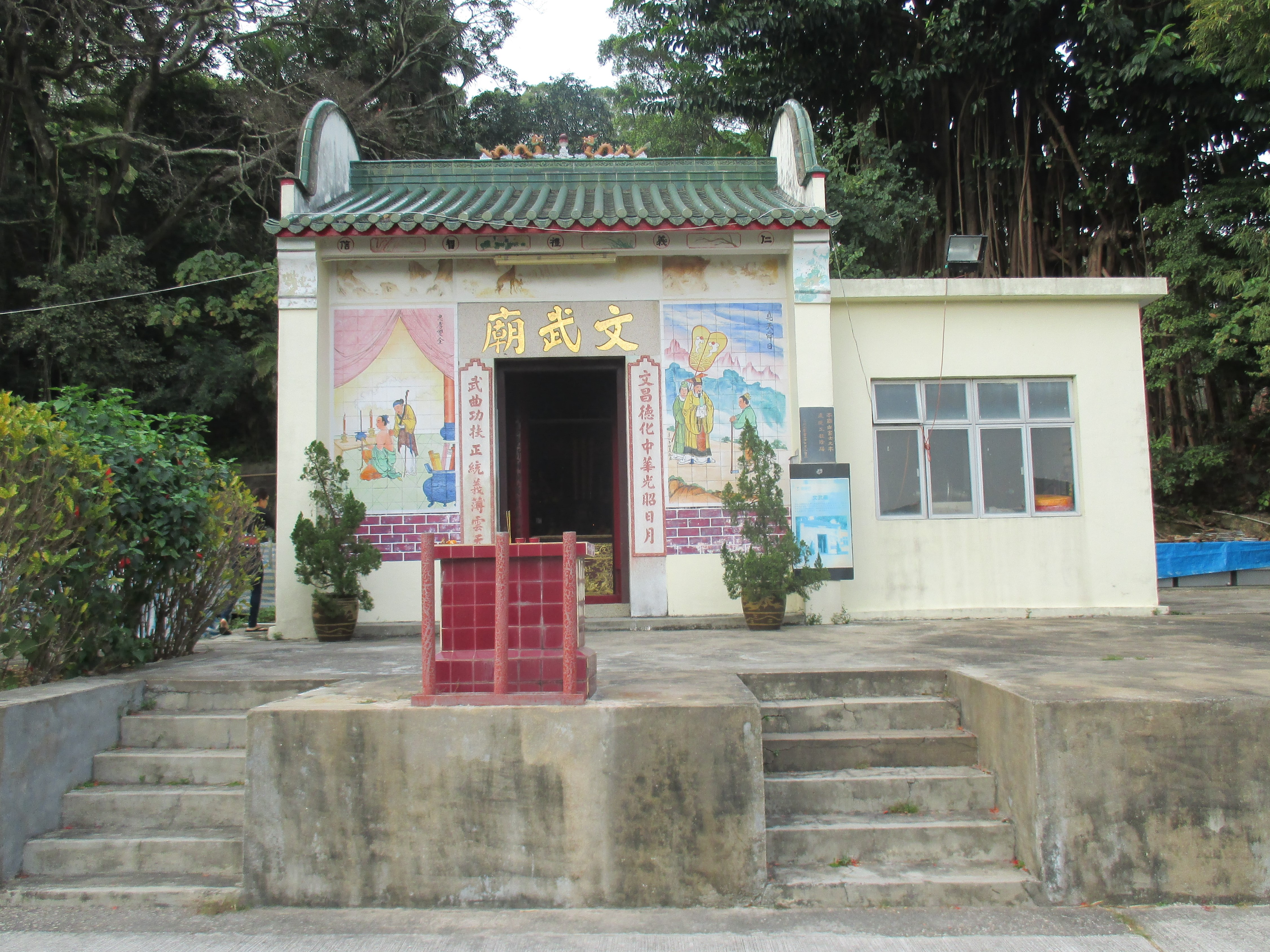
Man Mo Temple, Lantau

The Man Mo temple at Pak Ngan Heung (白銀鄉), in Mui Wo, Lantau Island, underwent a major renovation in 1960 and was rebuilt in 2001.

== See also ==
- Martial temple
- Wen Wu temple
- Hip Tin temples in Hong Kong
- Kwan Tai temples in Hong Kong
- Tin Hau temples in Hong Kong
