= Shui Chuen O =

Mountain in Hong Kong

- 水泉澳
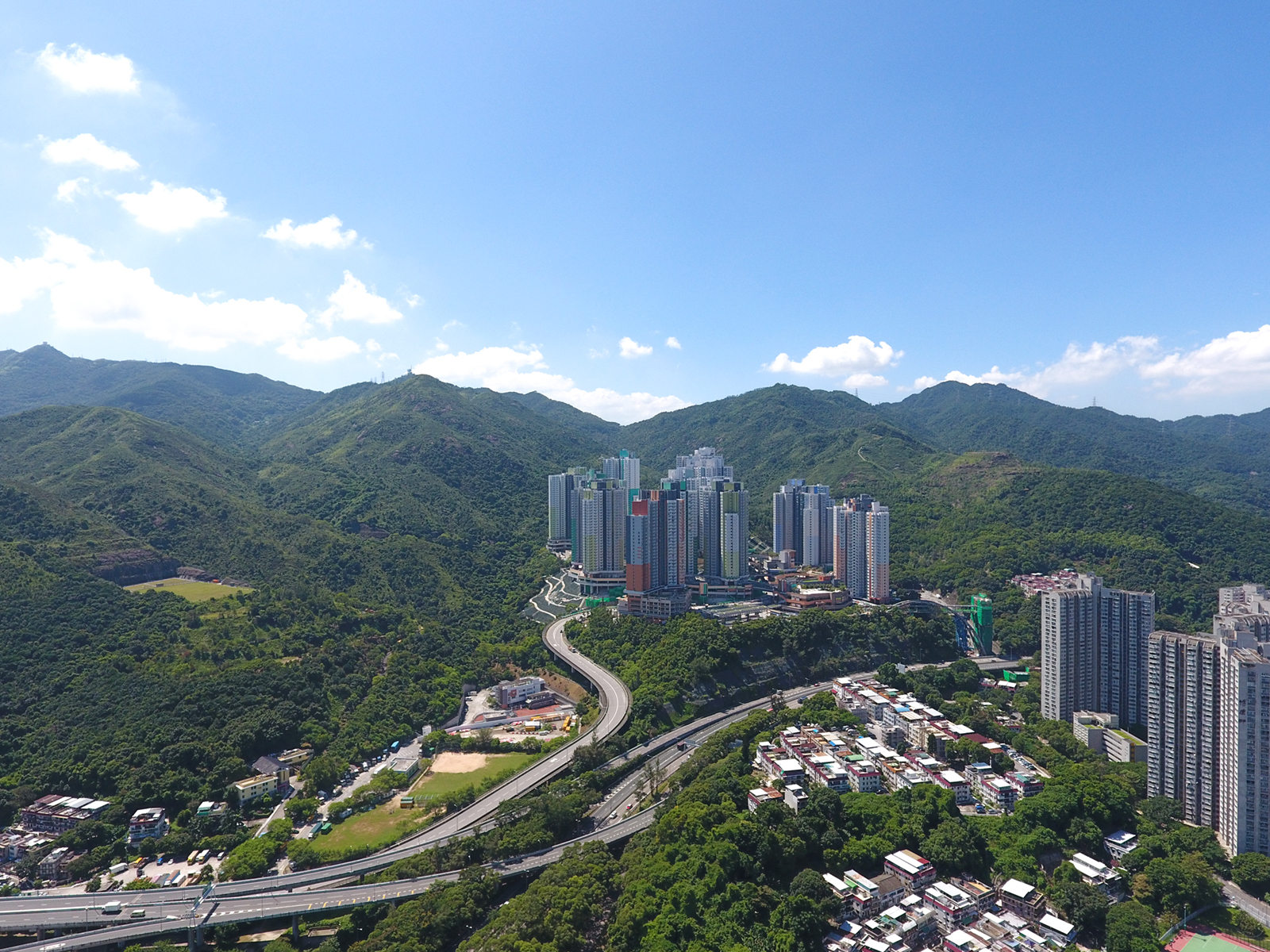
- Shui Chuen O and surrounding area

Highest point
- Elevation: 372 m (1,220 ft)
- Prominence: 372 m (1,220 ft)
- Coordinates: 22°21′58″N 114°12′11″E

Geography
- Location within Hong Kong
- Location: Sha Tin, Hong Kong

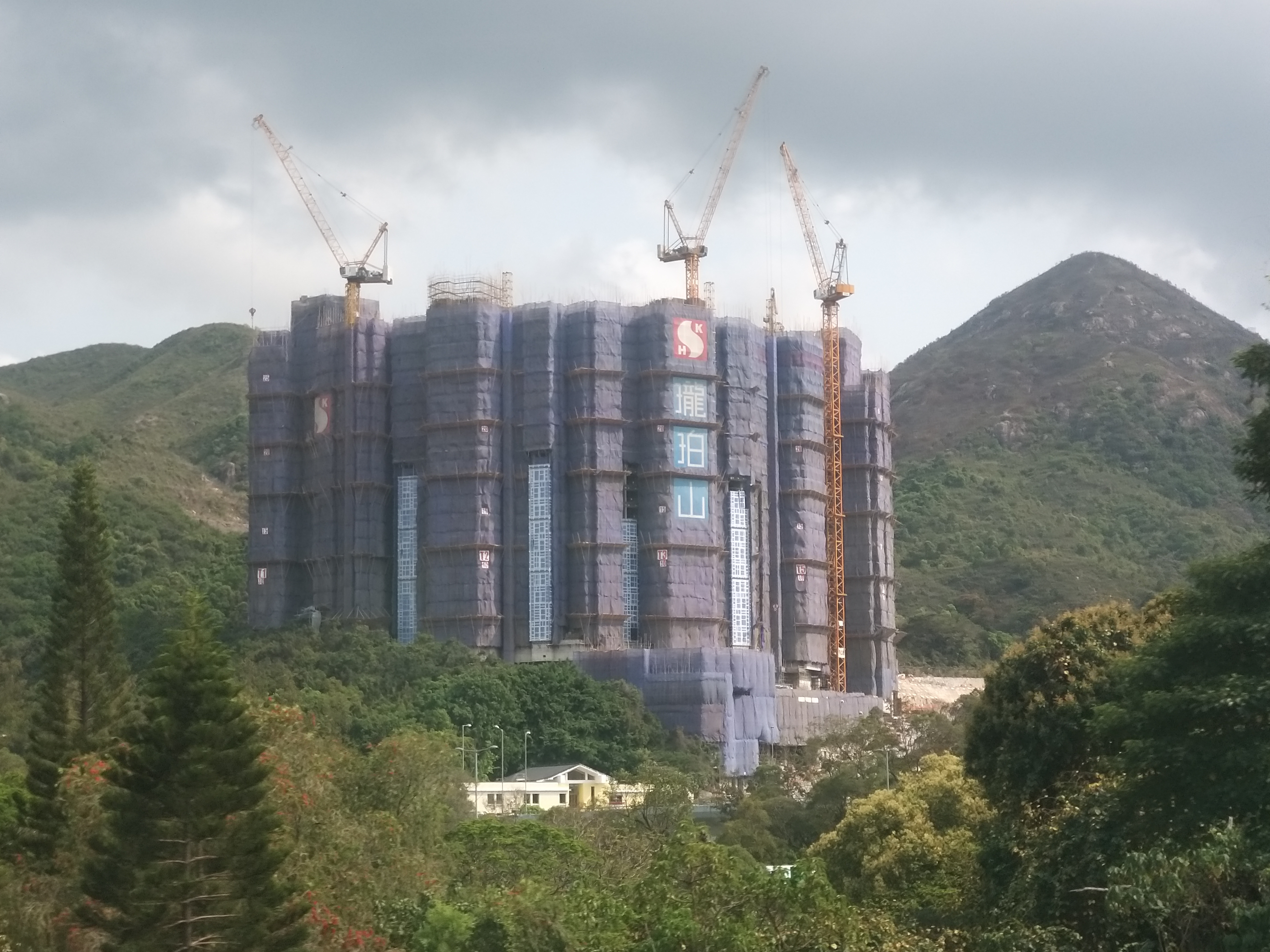
Saint Michel (瓏珀山) private housing estate under construction, with Shui Chuen O in the background.

Shui Chuen O (Chinese: 水泉澳), also known as Sugar Loaf Peak, is a 372 metres (1,220 ft) tall mountain located in Sha Tin, in Hong Kong's New Territories.

== Residential area ==
The Shui Chuen O area is located between Lion Rock Country Park and Ma On Shan Country Park. Currently, this area primarily consists of public housing estates. The use of Country Park periphery sites at Shui Chuen O for housing has been controversial and conservationists have warned that such development could "spread like a virus".

== See also ==
- List of mountains, peaks and hills in Hong Kong
- Shui Chuen O Estate
- Sha Tin
- Fo Tan
