= Silver Mine Bay Beach =

Beach in Lantau Island, New Territories, Hong Kong

- Beach
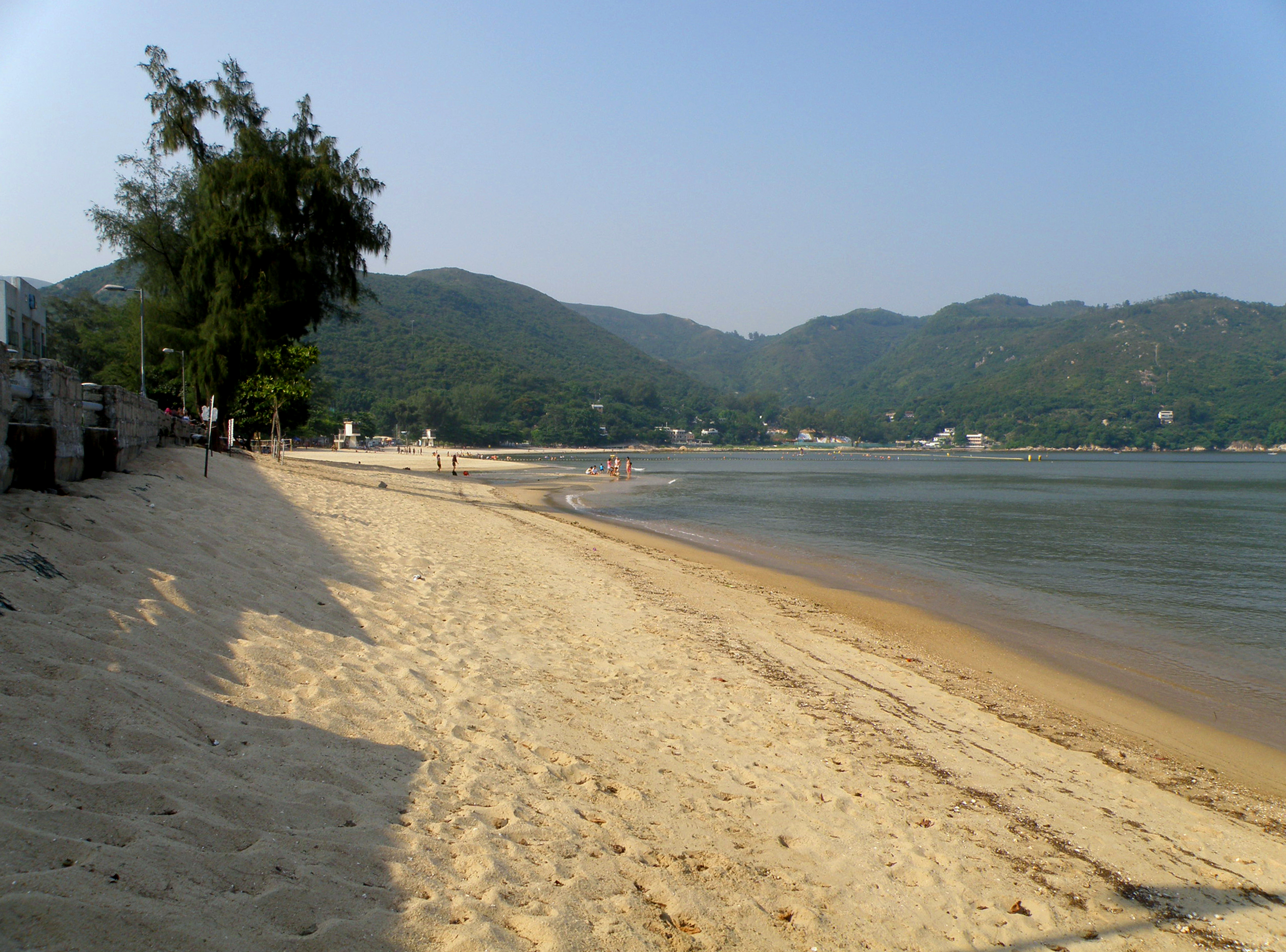
- Silver Mine Bay Beach

- Location within Hong Kong
- Coordinates: 22.27014°N 113.99898°E
- Location: Mui Wo, Lantau Island

Dimensions
  - Length: 210 m (690 ft)
- Patrolled by: Leisure and Cultural Services Department

Silver Mine Bay Beach
- Traditional Chinese: 銀礦灣泳灘
- Simplified Chinese: 银矿湾泳滩
Transcriptions
Standard Mandarin
- Hanyu Pinyin: Yín Kuàng Wān Yǒng Tān
Yue: Cantonese
- Jyutping: ngan4 kwong3 waan1 wing6 taan1

Silver Mine Bay Beach or Silvermine Bay Beach is a gazetted beach located facing Silver Mine Bay on Tung Wan Tau Road in Mui Wo, Lantau Island, Hong Kong. The beach has barbecue pits and is managed by the Leisure and Cultural Services Department of the Hong Kong Government. The beach is 210 metres long and is rated as good to fair by the Environmental Protection Department for its water quality in the past twenty years. The beach offers views of Hei Ling Chau.

== History ==
The beach is named "Silver Mine Bay" because there was a silver mine in Mui Wo in the 19th century.

The beach previously did not have any lifeguard services available. However, on 21 November 2016, the beach had undergone improvement works and the works were completed in July 2018, which included a new barbecue pit area, a sitting-out area and a viewing deck near the beach’s entrance. The new facilities were officially opened on 22 July 2018 and lifeguard services were introduced for the first time at the beach.

== Usage ==
The beach is enclosed in Silver Mine Bay and the sea condition is usually calm. There were 28,150 visitors during the seven-month-long official bathing season in 2020 — an average of 348 on weekdays and 887 on weekends and public holidays. There were 1,740 visitors on the busiest day, and 15,870 during the busiest month.

== Features ==
The beach has the following features:

- BBQ pits (24 nos.)
- Changing rooms
- Showers
- Toilets
- Fast food kiosk
- Family changing room
- Babycare room
- Beach volleyball court

== See also ==
- Beaches of Hong Kong
