= Tai Long =

Tai Long may refer to:

- Tai Long language
- Tai Long Village a.k.a. Tai Long Tsuen (Chinese: 大浪村), the oldest and largest village in the Tai Long Wan (Sai Kung District) area
- Tai Long, Chi Ma Wan, a village near Tai Long Wan, on Chi Ma Wan Peninsula
- Tai Long Wan (disambiguation)
- Wo Hang Tai Long (Chinese: 禾坑大朗), a village in Sha Tau Kok, North District, Hong Kong
