= Big Wave =

Big Wave may refer to:

- Big Wave (Misato Watanabe album), 1993
- Big Wave (Tatsuro Yamashita album), 1984
- "Big Wave", a song by Pearl Jam from Pearl Jam, 2006
- The Big Wave, a 1948 novel by Pearl S. Buck

== See also ==
- Big Wave Bay (disambiguation)
