= Steve Meerson =

American screenwriter

- Born: Los Angeles, United States
- Education: UCLA; UC San Diego; University of Southern California's Graduate School of Cinematic Arts
- Occupations: Screenwriter, producer
- Years active: 1980–present

Steve Meerson is an American screenwriter and producer. He is best known for co-writing the iconic Star Trek IV: The Voyage Home (1986). for which he and his long-time writing partner, Peter Krikes, were awarded first position screenplay credit by the Writers Guild of America for their majority contribution to the script and subsequently received a Saturn Award nomination honoring the best science fiction work of the year.

== Early life ==
A fourth-generation Los Angeles native, Meerson attended UCLA, where he made John Wooden's national championship 1969-70 basketball team as a walk-on. After an injury as a sophomore, he transferred to UC San Diego, where he graduated with high honors and a B.A. in U.S. history. He later attended USC's Graduate School of Cinematic Arts.

Prior to selling his first script (to Disney), also penned with Peter Krikes, Meerson worked in finance.

== Career ==
Over the years, Meerson has worked for every major studio as well as independent international production companies across all genres. He penned Back to the Beach, Double Impact, and wrote and co-produced Fox 2000's Anna and the King, starring Jodie Foster and Chow Yun Fat. In addition, he has done uncredited "script doctoring" on other features, including Summer School featuring Mark Harmon, and Red Heat starring Arnold Schwarzenegger. Throughout his career, he has also mentored many aspiring screenwriters who have gone on to build successful careers in the industry.

Presently, Meerson is a founding and principal partner in 917 MEDIA, a start-up designed to capitalize on evolving opportunities in the entertainment industry by creating, developing, and producing scripted TV series, films, and documentaries.

== Personal life ==
Meerson is married and has one son.

== Filmography ==
- Anna and the King (1999)
- Double Impact (1991)
- Back to the Beach (1987)
- Star Trek IV: The Voyage Home (1986)
