= Double Impact =

1991 American action film by Sheldon Lettich

- Theatrical release poster
- Directed by: Sheldon Lettich
- Screenplay by: Sheldon Lettich; Jean-Claude Van Damme
- Story by: Sheldon Lettich; Jean-Claude Van Damme; Steve Meerson; Peter Krikes
- Produced by: Jean-Claude Van Damme; Ashok Amritraj
- Starring: Jean-Claude Van Damme
- Cinematography: Richard H. Kline
- Edited by: Mark Conte
- Music by: Arthur Kempel
- Production companies: Stone Group Pictures; Vision International
- Distributed by: Columbia Pictures
- Release date: August 9, 1991 (Los Angeles)
- Running time: 110 minutes
- Country: United States
- Languages: English; Cantonese
- Budget: $15-$16 million
- Box office: $80.5 million

Double Impact is a 1991 American action film co-written and directed by Sheldon Lettich, and co-written, produced by and starring Jean-Claude Van Damme in a dual role as identical twin brothers. It follows Chad and Alex Wagner, who seek revenge against the Hong Kong triads who murdered their parents.

The cast also features Geoffrey Lewis, Alan Scarfe, Alonna Shaw, Philip Chan, Corinna Everson and Bolo Yeung. The film marks Van Damme's third collaboration with director Lettich (who wrote Bloodsport and directed Lionheart) and second collaboration with Yeung (the first being Bloodsport in 1988).

Double Impact was released in the United States by Columbia Pictures on August 9, 1991. It received mixed reviews from critics, but was a commercial success.

== Plot ==
In Hong Kong in 1966, business partners Paul Wagner and Nigel Griffith open the Victoria Harbour Tunnel. Paul attends with his wife Katherine and their identical twin infant sons, Chad and Alex. After the celebration, the family is followed home by their bodyguard, Frank Avery, whom they dismiss. Once he leaves, a Triad hit squad follows them. A shootout ensues, in which Paul is killed. Katherine begs the Triads to spare the twins but is killed by Moon, the top henchman. Their maid is able to escape with Alex and Frank eventually saves Chad; the maid leaves Alex at a Hong Kong orphanage and Frank raises Chad in France.

25 years later in 1991, Chad and Frank are running a successful martial arts dojo in Los Angeles when Frank tells a surprised Chad about a new "business" in Hong Kong. The two go to a mahjong parlor and a woman, mistaking Chad for Alex, takes him back to Alex's room. When Alex arrives, he knocks out Chad for being with his girlfriend, Danielle Wilde.

Frank tells them they are identical twin brothers and they need to join to take down Griffith and get their part of the royalties from the tunnel, but Chad and Alex initially do not get along with each other. Alex takes them out on his boat to sell smuggled Mercedes and cigarettes to some Chinese buyers, but the Hong Kong Police arrive and Chad dumps the cars to escape the cops faster. Back in Hong Kong, some thugs kidnap and beat up Chad (mistaking him for Alex) when he refuses to work for their leader, Raymond Zhang. Danielle, who works for Griffith, begins checking his private files for information, but she is being watched closely by Griffith's bodyguard, Kara.

Alex takes Chad and Frank to an abandoned hotel on an island to conduct their operations. With intelligence from Danielle, they attack a drug operation and blow it up. Next, they attack a club frequented by Zhang by pretending to bring him Cognac smuggled from France, which is actually just crates of bombs, although they fail to kill Zhang. Danielle continues to search for information but is caught and sexually molested by Kara. Danielle later calls the hideout revealing she has found something, but her phone is tapped by Griffith. Unable to find Alex and Frank who are out gathering firewood, Chad takes the boat to rescue Danielle by himself. However, Alex becomes paranoid and begins drinking heavily while imagining Chad and Danielle having sex. Chad brings Danielle home, but Kara follows them in a helicopter and discovers their hideout. When they return, Alex attacks Chad in a drunken rage before the brothers angrily part ways for the night.

The next morning Chad and Alex awaken to see Triads landing on the beach and, although they kill several, Frank and Danielle are captured. They capture one Triad who reveals that Frank and Danielle have been taken to Zhang's boat at a pier. Chad and Alex board and fight their way through the ship; Chad kills Moon (who beat him when he was kidnapped earlier) and he and Alex rescue Frank and Danielle. Afterwards, the twin brothers split up: Chad pursues Griffith and Alex chases Zhang. Alex eventually kills Zhang when he falls to his death from atop a crane. Chad and Danielle are chased through a maze of shipping containers until Griffith threatens to crush Chad with a forklift holding a container. Chad jumps into the water, sneaks around into the forklift, and drops the container on Griffith, killing him. Alex, Chad, Danielle and Frank reunite after the ordeal and appear to set aside their differences.

== Cast ==
- Jean-Claude Van Damme as:
  - Alex Wagner, Chad's identical twin brother
    - Paul Aylett as baby Alex
  - Chad Wagner, Alex's identical twin brother
    - Alicia Stevenson as baby Chad
- Geoffrey Lewis as Frank Avery
- Alan Scarfe as Nigel Griffith
- Philip Chan Yan Kin as Raymond Zhang
- Bolo Yeung as Moon
- Cory Everson as Kara
- Alonna Shaw as Danielle Wilde
- Peter Malota as "Spurs"
- Andy Armstrong as Paul Wagner, Alex & Chad's father
- Sarah-Jane Varley as Katherine Wagner, Alex & Chad's mother
- Julie Strain and Shelley Michelle as Chad's Students
- John Sham as a HKPF Officer

== Production ==
=== Writing ===
Director Sheldon Lettich co-wrote the script with Van Damme. Inspiration was taken from Alexandre Dumas' The Corsican Brothers; an 1844 novella about twins separated at birth, who find each other in adulthood. Lettich later recalled the concept of Van Damme playing twins "was so successful that other producers wanted him to repeat it." (Timecop, Maximum Risk, Replicant) "Even though it meant a lot more work for Jean-Claude, he enjoyed the challenge of playing two distinctly different characters, showcasing a dark and a more light-hearted side in the same movie."

Boaz Yakin was an uncredited script doctor.

=== Casting ===
Van Damme was reportedly paid $600,000 for the movie. He hoped playing the dual role of Chad/Alex would change his image and help him break away from the martial arts movie genre he had become so popularly known for. "[Alex] is violent and [Chad] is not, so audiences [will] see the contrast in my work." Prior to the film's release, he had told the Los Angeles Times: "If I stay in martial arts pictures people will get tired of my films." Van Damme felt Double Impact's love scene would appeal to a wider audience. Seeing Jeremy Irons portray a dual role in Dead Ringers allegedly influenced Van Damme's decision.

=== Filming ===
Principal photography began in Hong Kong on November 4, 1990. Scenes were filmed at Lippo Centre (Nigel Griffith's headquarters), Tsing Yi Container Processing Terminal (Raymond Zhang & Triad scene) and the Star Ferry port (escape scene). The hideout used by Alex & Chad was filmed at Mong Tung Wan at the Chi Ma Wan trail on Lantau Island.

Shooting then moved to Los Angeles, where many of the interiors were filmed. The dojo scene was filmed in Santa Clarita.

== Music ==
=== Soundtrack ===
Double Impact: Original Soundtrack Recordings

Film score by Arthur Kempel
- Released: 1993
- Genre: Soundtrack
- Length: 40:32
- Label: Silva Screen Records Ltd

The score by Arthur Kempel was released as the Double Impact Original Soundtrack Recordings in 1993 by Silva America. The soundtrack was released on CD contained twelve tracks with a runtime of 40 minutes. The background song at the Klimax Club scene Some of That was performed by Gen “Genzo” Rubin, (who performed the end credits song Feel the Impact) has not been featured on the soundtrack.

All music is composed by Arthur Kempel.

Track listing
| No. | Title | Length |
|---|---|---|
| 1. | "Overture (written by Paul Dable)" | 01:16 |
| 2. | "Dead Ringers" | 01:24 |
| 3. | "The Brother's Revenge" | 03:38 |
| 4. | "I Miss You" | 00:55 |
| 5. | "Battle at Sea" | 05:47 |
| 6. | "Causeway Bay" | 07:19 |
| 7. | "The Other Side of the World" | 01:15 |
| 8. | "Hong Kong Pursuit" | 04:14 |
| 9. | "Zang's Offer" | 06:45 |
| 10. | "The Brother's Reunion" | 02:23 |
| 11. | "End Title" | 02:50 |
| 12. | "Feel the Impact" | 03:02 |
| Total length: | | 40:32 |

== Reception ==
=== Box office ===
Double Impact opened at No. 2 at the US box office and grossed $7.5 million in its opening weekend. By August 20, 1991, 11 days after the initial release, this increased to $15.3 million. According to Box Office Mojo, US receipts totaled $80.5 million by the end of the film's theatrical run.

=== Critical response ===
==== Initial reviews ====
Calling the plot "minimal" at best, Chris Hicks of the Deseret News gave a negative review. He went on to say: "the story makes no sense and is often more laughable than exciting." Whilst adding that this "probably won't deter fans," Hicks noted "more gunplay here than in most Van Damme efforts, which may or may not be an improvement." "Van Damme's idea of a love scene is a soft-lens, soft-core moment as he and newcomer Alonna Shaw roll around nude in a paranoid fantasy sequence. So much for romance."

Caryn James of The New York Times said: "there is plenty of gunfire and karate kicks and explosives set off by remote control. Chad gets bomped in the head more often than Alex. There are some Van Damme-style showdowns with various villains, with whirls and tricks that seem to owe something to the Three Stooges. There are golden oldies like smashing someone in the head with a whisky bottle and kicking him in the crotch. As it turns out, two Jean-Claude Van Damme's are pretty much the same as one. Fans who like their action unadultered by story, character or acting know where to find it."

Renowned critic Roger Ebert awarded the film two stars, saying: "it has a budget and production values of a lesser James Bond movie." However, Ebert gave credit for the "slick product values" and "few clever lines." He went on to compare Van Damme to fellow martial artist and actor Steven Seagal; in that they "are always at the center of their plots. [This] will hurt their careers in the long run, since martial arts movies are limited by their formulas, and the heroes are supplied with almost ritualistic plot patterns." Ebert believed both would make "splendid villains in more ambitious movies."

Despite calling the plot "elementary but serviceable", Kevin Thomas, of the Los Angeles Times, gave a positive review, saying: "[Double Impact] offers two Jean-Claude Van Dammes for the price of one, and for fans of the Belgian-born martial arts star, it delivers the goods. It's a solid, fast-moving action-adventure set largely in Hong Kong, which is dynamically photographed by Richard Kline.

==== Contemporary consensus ====
On Rotten Tomatoes, the review aggregator, Double Impact has an approval rating of 33% based on 24 reviews. Audiences polled by CinemaScore gave the film an average grade of "B+" on an A+ to F scale.

== Home media ==
The film was released on a remastered Blu-Ray by MVD Visual in May 2019, and on Ultra HD Blu-ray in February 2026.

== Cancelled sequel ==
"Double Impact [would make] a great franchise. Today, Chad would be like [the character I portrayed] in JCVD and Alex [the character I portrayed in] The Expendables 2."

— Van Damme discussing the cancelled sequel with MTV. (2012)

Van Damme and Lettich had been discussing a potential sequel for "many years." During a 2011 dinner with Bolo Yeung, Van Damme mentioned that the film would be coming "soon". While promoting The Expendables 2 in 2012, Van Damme confirmed a sequel was in the works. That same year, Lettich completed a treatment based on a story by Van Damme; "along with 25 pages of screenplay." Double Impact 2 was envisioned by Van Damme to be more serious in tone than the original.

Plans for a sequel fell through as far back as 2015. The sequel was "ambitious" and would have been expensive to produce. Lettich said "there were a lot of logistical problems. Mostly around who owned the rights." It turned out that "MGM owned the majority of the rights" and "acquiring them was not going to be cheap." Furthermore, "the studio had to be included as a co-partner with any producing entity", which allegedly made the "process even more difficult and complicated" given MGM's apparent unwillingness to financially back the sequel.

In 2019, a restored 35mm film-version of Double Impact was screened at the Alamo Drafthouse Cinema in Austin, Texas. Lettich reaffirmed the cancellation and told fans during the Q&A that "perhaps the biggest reason [a sequel] didn't happen was in fact due to the [original] film's success."
