= Mong Tung Wan =

Bay and village on Lantau Island, Hong Kong

Coordinates: 22.222849°N 113.984494°E

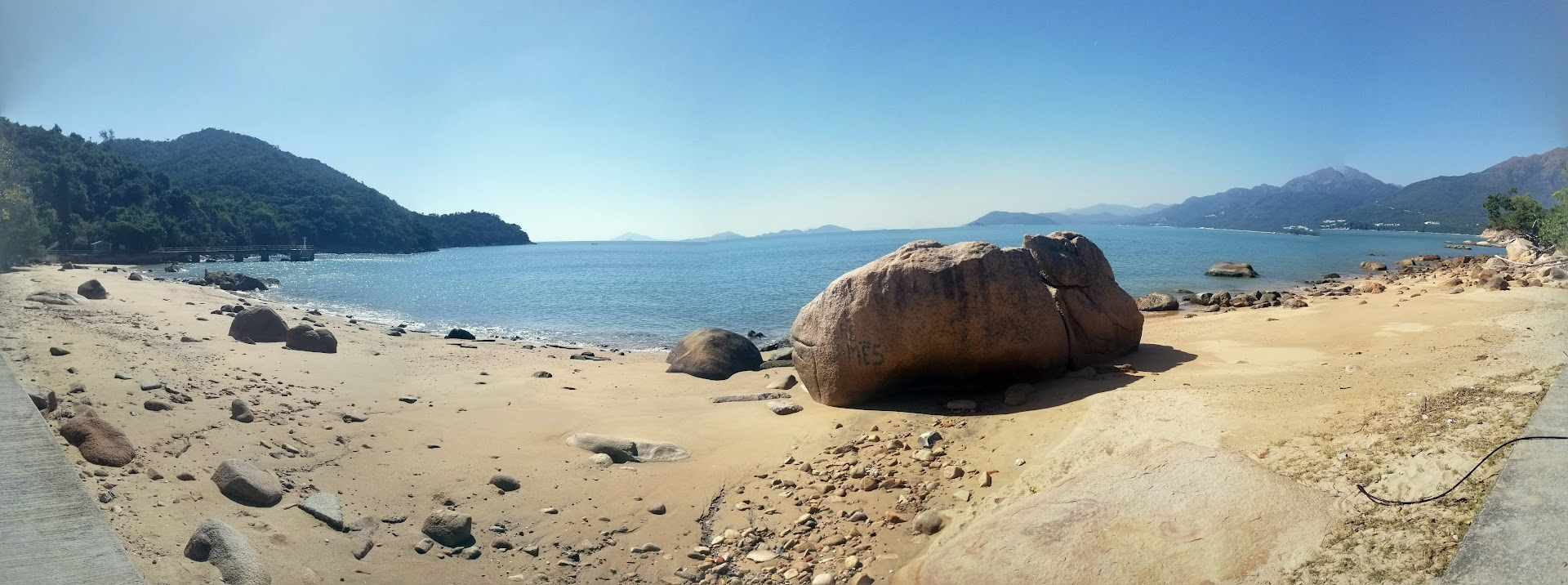
Mong Tung Wan

Mong Tung Wan (Chinese: 望東灣) is a bay and a village on Chi Ma Wan Peninsula, Lantau Island, in Hong Kong.

== Administration ==
Mong Tung Wan is a recognized village under the New Territories Small House Policy.

== Popular culture ==
- Mong Tung Wan was used as a filming location in the 1991 movie Double Impact.
