= Christian Zheng Sheng College =

Private school in Hong Kong

Coordinates: 22.2264°N 114.0119°E

- 基督教正生書院
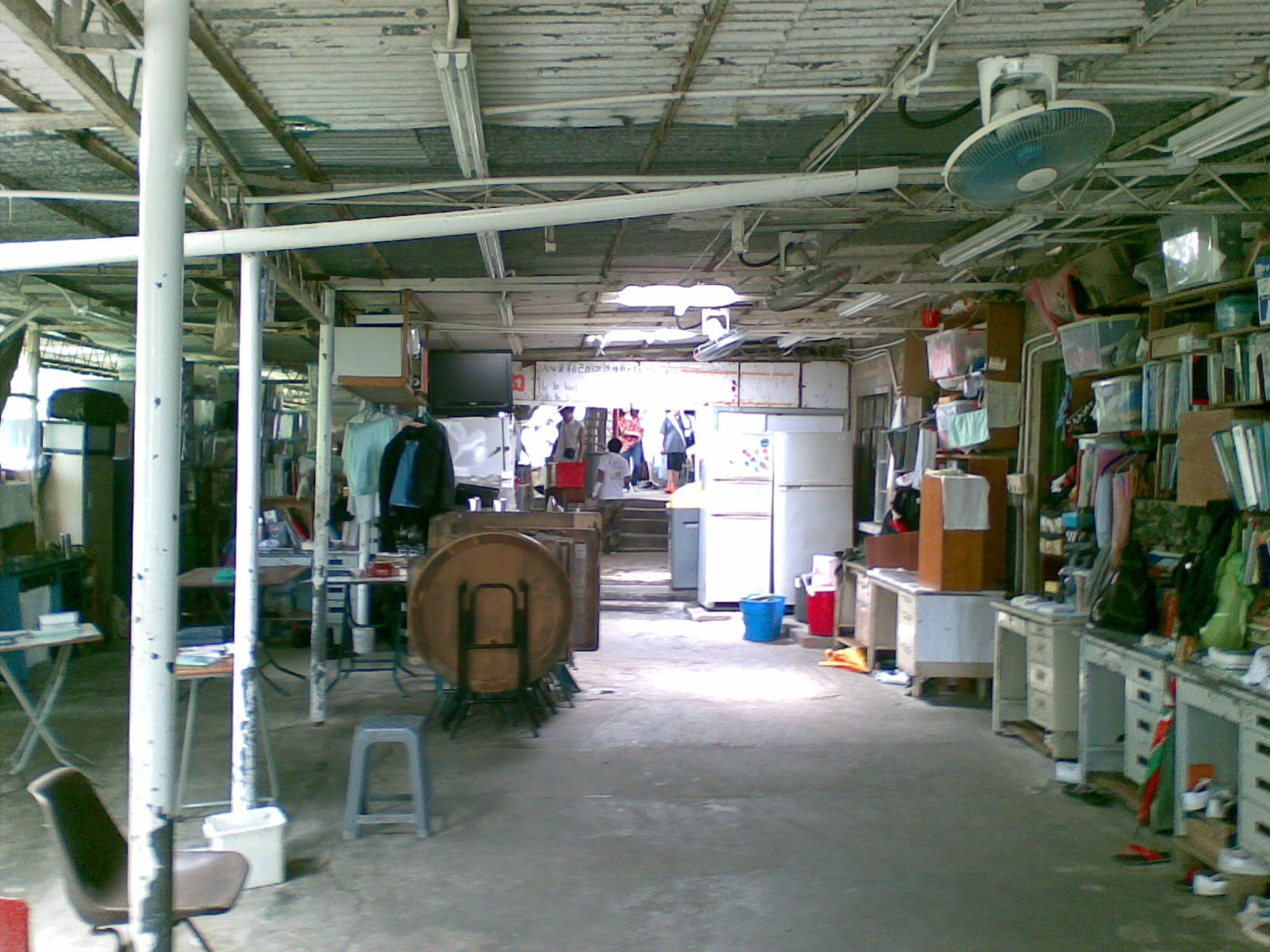
- Chi Ma Wan; Hong Kong; China

Information
- Type: Private School
- Religious affiliation: Christian
- Established: 1998
- Closed: 2024
- Director: Lam Hay Sing
- Principal: Chan Siu Cheuk
- Specialisation: Drug problems
- Website: zhengsheng.org.hk

Christian Zheng Sheng College
- Traditional Chinese: 基督教正生書院
- Simplified Chinese: 基督教正生书院
Transcriptions
Standard Mandarin
- Hanyu Pinyin: Jīdūjiào Zhèngshēng Shūyuàn
Yue: Cantonese
- Yale Romanization: Gēi dūk gaau jing sāang syū yún
- Jyutping: Gei1 duk1 gaau3 zing3 sang1 syu1 jyun2

Christian Zheng Sheng College was a private school in Hong Kong established by the Christian Zheng Sheng Association (ZSA). Its founder and principal is Alman Chan Siu Cheuk. The school aims to correct problematic students with drug addiction and other problems using life education.

== History and funding ==
The college was established in 1985 as a drug addiction treatment centre, and registered as a private school in 1998. The college is Hong Kong's only educational establishment dedicated to helping reform young drug offenders. As a private school, it does not receive any subsidies from the Education Bureau. Public donations make up less than 10 percent of the funding needs. According to press reports, teachers are paid 80% of their salaries, the principal is paid 60% of his salary, and the budget for each student is only one-third of that for special students at subsidised institutions. School fees and boarding fees from the school are the main revenue source for the Zheng Sheng Association, but the ZSA revealed that school operated on a break-even basis in aggregate over the past 11 years.

Gossip magazine Next Magazine created a stir when it published allegations that the ZSA had investments valued at HK$35.2 million (US$4.5 million) in the mainland and Japan, some of which are said to be "questionable". The Association subsequently said that its investments in restaurants, tea houses, and farms serve as employment venues where its students can obtain work experience. It explained it had registered its business address, now the site of a brothel, in 2007 but had relocated following a change of operations but had neglected to amend the registration. The ICAC raided the offices of the Association, the school and Alma Chan's residence on 21 August. Documents were taken away as part of their investigation. Next continued to allege that Zheng Sheng's charities were fake, that subsidiary operation in Japan is a business entity engaging in real estate investments, its elderly home in Chaozhou is badly run and vacant, and that children at its orphanage in Henan starve from time to time and are often forced to do labour. Heung Yee Kuk chief Lau Wong-fat has also called on the government to launch an investigation into the Christian Zheng Sheng College drug-rehab-school saga.

The school is now considering separating its accounts from its parent organisation said board member Professor Daniel Shek Tan-lei. Shek has also requested the return of documents taken by the ICAC. Professor Daniel Shek is involved in many aspects of this saga. He is a board member of the Christian Zheng Sheng College and the chairman of ACAN, the Action Committee Against Narcotics the governmental body that advises the Hong Kong Narcotics Bureau. It was ACAN in June 2009 that proposed the move of the Christian Zheng Sheng College to the Mui Wo area. Professor Shek has also, in his role as ACAN Chairman been responsible for significant fund raising for the Christian Zheng Sheng Association. Professor Shek also continues to be a member of the ICAC Citizens Advisory Committee on Community Relations .

In December 2009, Shek resigned from its board to eliminate the risk of conflict of interest; principal Alman Chan said that the average monthly donations to the association had fallen to about HK$70,000 a month compared to about HK$110,000 before the investigation, and said that this would affect the annual Lunar New Year visit by a group of mainland orphans to Hong Kong.

On 22 March 2010, ICAC wrote a written statement to the college informing that ICAC didn't find any evidence of fraud or corruption. ICAC had ceased further investigation and closed the case. Furthermore, ICAC apologised for causing public anxiety towards the college.

On 7 June 2024, the school announced that it would cease operations on July 7 due to insufficient funding after funds were frozen by police as part of an ongoing investigation into fraud.

== Students ==
The existing school can accommodate 30 students; as of June 2009 there are 123 students. 90% of its students were ordered to enter the school by court verdict, and most are former drug addicts, with others having committed smuggling, theft and other crimes. The students strive to correct themselves to prepare for a new life in the society. Students with good performance may re-enter conventional secondary schools elsewhere in Hong Kong. According to Principal Alman Chan, 90% of the school's Form 5 graduates do not return to drugs, and most have no problem finding jobs.

The majority (100 out of 120) of students receive funds from the Hong Kong Government. According to the Social Welfare Department receives about HK$1 million of taxpayers money each month. The money is meant to support around 100 of the 120 students, with each getting around HK$10,000 in dole payments.

== Campus life ==
The college is a boarding school. Students stay for an average of three years. In addition to studying and revising, students engage in vocational training to prepare for a new life. They help in cooking and washing. Air conditioning and water heating are not available. The campus is located on Chi Ma Wan Peninsula, Lantau Island, accessed by kai-to from Cheung Chau or by road from lantau.

The dormitories in the main campus can only accommodate 72 persons, so some students live in the school's auxiliary dormitory on Cheung Chau and take kai-to to access the main campus. The tables and bookcases are handmade by students. There are only eight toilets at the campus. The campus has a wargame field, built and maintained by students. A stone on a slope overlooking the campus pose possible threat to the school.

The school also has a fast food shop selling pizzas on Cheung Chau.

== Relocation proposal ==
The college submitted a relocation application to the government in 2007. Four government departments, including the Education Bureau and Narcotics Division, have agreed in principle to move a cash-strapped drug rehabilitation school from Chi Ma Wan to the New Territories Heung Yee Kuk Southern District Secondary School site in Mui Wo on Lantau disused since 2007. Vocal protests from local residents about the relocation lead to widespread discussion in Hong Kong. They further argued that the site should be given over to start a secondary school, as their children are currently obliged to travel for 2–3 hours a day to reach other schools. They staged protests to expressed their opposition, often mobilising their children. A protest march organised attracted between 600 and 800 people. They were widely criticised for labelling Zheng Sheng students as "addicts", and as selfish for their opposition. An editorial in The Standard said the opposition is "the common 'not in my backyard' mentality". However, one rural committee member said that negative reports about the college would help their fight for the vacant school site.

Following a government survey which indicated 90% opposition by residents, the government sponsored a meeting in Mui Wo on 14 June to present the relocation plans and the future of the college. The meeting was attended by about 200 local residents. The school said that the relocation is needed because the existing premises were overcrowded, and there are safety concerns. The college has more than twice the number of students than it should accommodate. The school's supervisor announced its desire to settle in Mui Wo, declaring: "We are not outsiders but part of it." His, and government representatives' remarks were met with boos as residents held protesting signs against the re-location of the school. Some residents expressed hostility towards students, calling them "addicts", and causing some to break into tears. Secretary for Security Ambrose Lee Siu-kwong said: "The government understands how local residents feel, but the college has a positive contribution to re-educate the young drug abusers."

=== Legislative Council and Government ===
Former Chief Executive Donald Tsang expressed hoped that local communities could help young drug abusers return to society. He said "...young people do sometimes go astray... I hope Hong Kong society generally, and the Mui Wo community in particular, can embrace these young people with love and give them a second chance." However, the government was criticised by Islands district councillors for a lack of consultation on the school's relocation. Security Bureau principal assistant secretary (narcotics) said 50 rural sites have been evaluated, with only a few can meet the requirements of the rehabilitation college.

Prominent persons, including government officials, have expressed their support towards Zheng Sheng College. Pan democrats issued a joint statement supporting the relocation decision; 35 Legislative Council members signed the letter expressing support towards the move, sent to the Chief Executive on 19 June 2009.

Julie Chen of the Education Bureau said Mui Wo only has 24 Primary One students and 50 Secondary One students in 2009, not enough to fulfil the requirement for a secondary school. However the catchment area for the secondary school would take in the other villages in south Lantau (Pui O, Tong Fuk) and the island of Peng Chau. According to government figures, the population of Mui Wo and nearby districts was 5,200 in 2006, of which 1,096 were primary, secondary as well as university students. As only 86 students chose to study at the school, which used Chinese as its medium of instruction, in 2006–07, it closed down in 2007.

=== School ===
Following protests from Mui Wo residents, students wrote letters to Mui Wo residents and the Heung Yee Kuk expressing regret over their past wrongdoings, and pleading to be allowed to move into their new location.

The school feared the controversy will delay its relocation. Supervisor Jacob Lam Hay-sing said: "[The students] are part of society and we can't exile them. They need a formal school to accommodate them and we can't just accept any place. Don't forget there may be a few thousand drug abusers in formal schools."

Following the petition organised by the pan democrats, the principal expressed concern that such a politicisation by the pan-democrats could actually backfire on the school.

=== Alternative plans ===
The Mui Wo Rural Committee has suggested 17 locations to the college. The committee has also suggested that the school expand at its own site. However, Alman Chan has pointed out that such a plan is impossible due to its position in a valley with few flat land. He also pointed out that this would involve expensive blasting and land rights problem. However, to date neither the administration or the Zheng Sheng College have published a formal selection criteria

The Heung Yee Kuk, which was asked by the government to mediate in the row, suggested nine alternative school sites. Alman Chan expresses that he is open to the suggestions, but opines that the Mui Wo campus suits the needs of the college best, and that he hopes the new campus can enjoy better linkage with Cheung Chau.

Daniel Lam, the chairman of the Islands District Council, proposed the drug addiction treatment centres on Hei Ling Chau and Shek Kwu Chau, two other islands near Lantau, as possible sites. Alman Chan commented that the college is a school instead of a drug addiction treatment centre, hoping that the college can be adjacent to smaller communities, to facilitate social work for students. He would not comment further as the Government has not expressed its prose on the sites. The last principal of the New Territories Heung Yee Kuk Southern District Secondary School also suggested to use a piece of vacant land behind the campus.
