= Shap Long Reservoir =

Irrigation reservoir in New Territories, Hong Kong

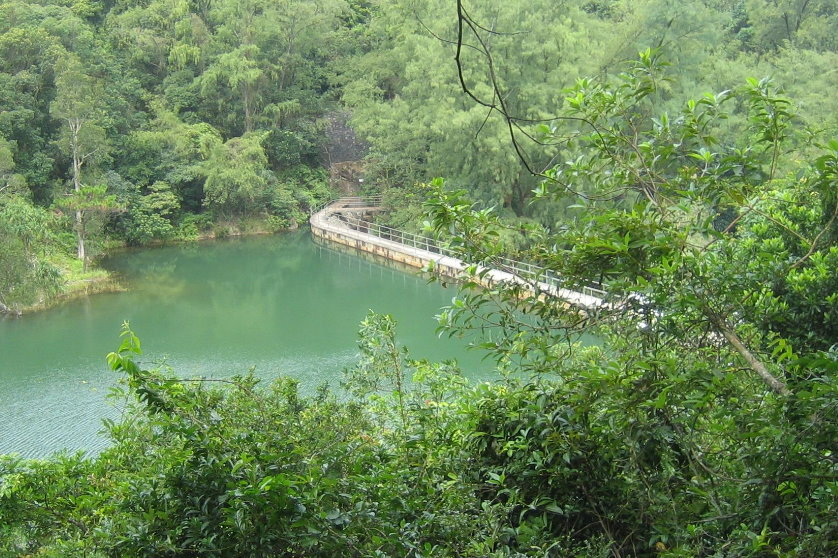
- Shap Long Reservoir

- Location within Hong Kong
- Location: Lantau Island, New Territories, Hong Kong
- Coordinates: 22.23239°N 113.998886°E
- Type: reservoir
- Built: 1955; 71 years ago
- Water volume: 130,000 cubic metres (4,600,000 cu ft)

Shap Long Reservoir
- Traditional Chinese: 十塱水塘
Transcriptions
Yue: Cantonese
- Yale Romanization: Sahp lóhng séui tòhng
- Jyutping: Sap6 long5 seoi2 tong4

Shap Long Reservoir (also known as Chi Ma Wan Reservoir or Shap Long Irrigation Reservoir), built in 1955, is a reservoir located in Chi Ma Wan Peninsula and Lantau South Country Park in Chi Ma Wan, Lantau Island, Hong Kong. The Chi Ma Wan Country Trail and the Chi Ma Wan Mountain Bike Trail pass through the reservoir. The reservoir used to be the main water source for the residents of Cheung Chau, Peng Chau and Hei Ling Chau in the Islands District before being converted into an irrigation reservoir in the 1970s.

== History ==
Before the construction of Shek Pik Reservoir, the freshwater in Cheung Chau had always come from groundwater. In the 1950s, the population of Cheung Chau continued to rise and the economy became more and more prosperous. In order to solve the water supply problems, the Hong Kong Government built a concrete dam on Chi Ma Wan Peninsula, Lantau, on the opposite bank of Cheung Chau with a capacity of about 130,000 m^{3}, 91.1 m long and 15 m high in a small reservoir and then used a 6-inch submarine pipe to divert water to the Cheung Chau Ferry Pier and transport it to the water storage tanks of Tai Kwai Wan. At that time, the government also followed the practice of the first submarine water pipeline from Hong Kong Island to Kowloon to build a fountain at the landing site, and held a water spray ceremony on the day of the opening ceremony in August 1955. In the 1970s, Cheung Chau was incorporated into the Hong Kong water supply network, and Shap Long Reservoir was converted into an irrigation reservoir.

In September 1954, construction of the dam commenced to impound 30 million gallons of water for a new fresh water supply to Cheung Chau. The filters, pump house and a service reservoir were constructed on the island and water was supplied to the island through a 150mm steel submarine pipeline 1.3 km long and 3.6 km of 150mm cement asbestos pipe. A new 300mm water main was installed in 1963 to provide water from the new Silver Mine Bay Water Treatment Works, rendering the reservoir obsolete. It was then utilised to support local farming and their irrigation needs.

== Ecology ==
The reservoir is located in a remote location on Chi Ma Wan Peninsula. The reservoir is composed of many clear and pollution-free tributaries and has not been disturbed by human beings. The entire reservoir is surrounded by tree-lined valleys and surrounded by mature woodlands. Because of this, there has not been evidence of alien species invasion, gave birth to a large number of freshwater fish, such as Oryzias curvinotus.

== See also ==
- List of reservoirs of Hong Kong
- Shap Long
