= Shap Long =

Coordinates: 22.242176°N 113.99286°E

- Village
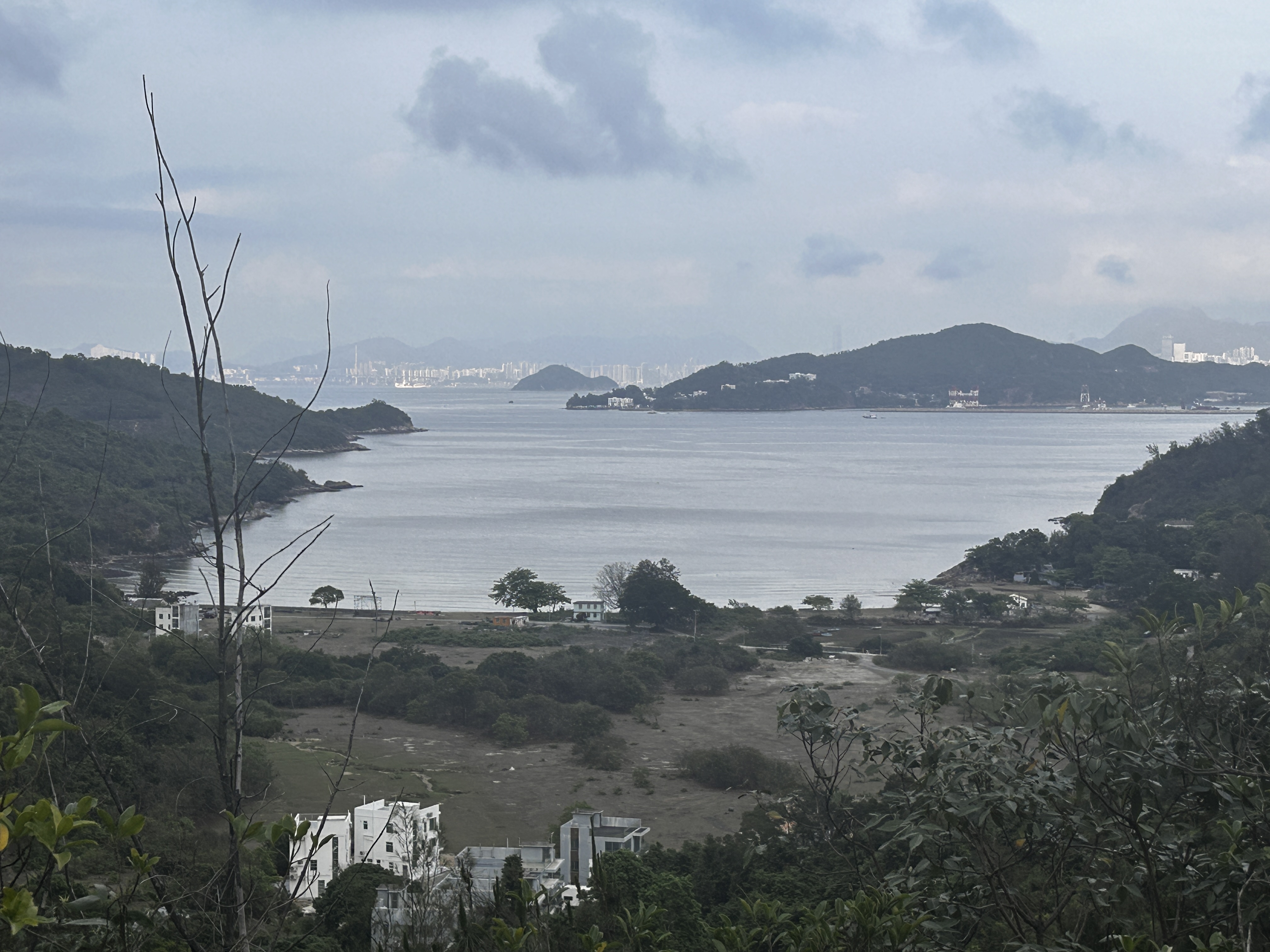
- Shap Long Bay and Hei Ling Chau viewed from Shap Long village
- Interactive map of Shap Long

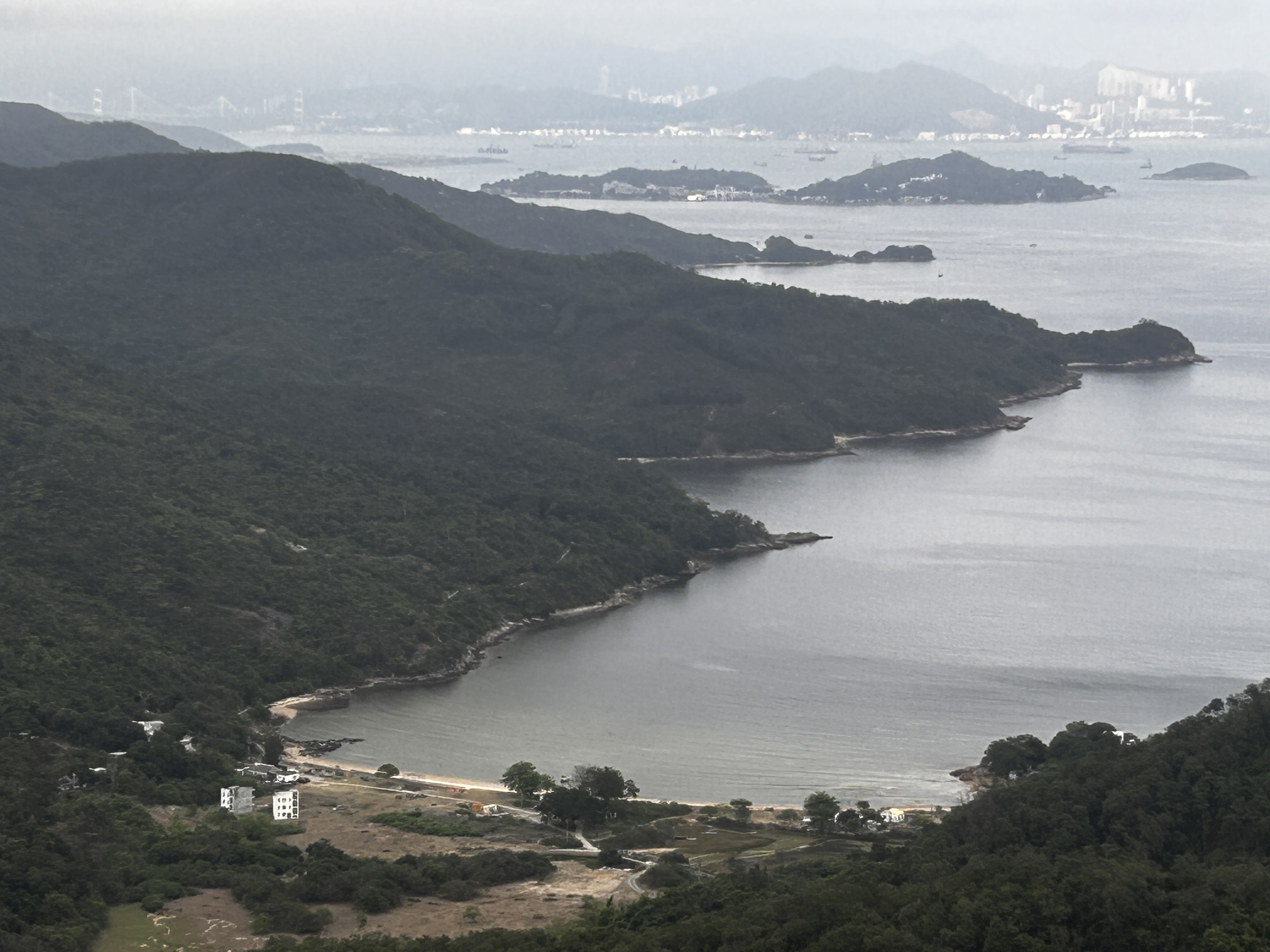
Shap Long Bay and Shap Long village

Shap Long (Chinese: 十塱) is a village located on Lantau Island in the New Territories, Hong Kong. It contains several settlements, including Shap Long Chung Hau (十塱涌口), Shap Long Kau Tsuen (十塱舊村) and Shap Long San Tsuen (十塱新村).

== Recognised status ==
Shap Long is a recognised village under the New Territories Small House Policy.

== History ==
In 1950, the Hong Kong Government and The Leprosy Mission decided to set up a leprosarium on nearby Hei Ling Chau. The inhabitants were given compensation to leave the island, and settled in nearby areas namely Tai Pak, Shap Long and Cheung Chau.

== Features ==
There is a Tin Hau Temple in Shap Long Chung Hau. It was rebuilt in 1951.

== See also ==
- Chi Ma Wan
- Shap Long Reservoir
