= Star Trek IV: The Voyage Home =

1986 American science fiction film directed by Leonard Nimoy

- Theatrical release poster art by Bob Peak
- Directed by: Leonard Nimoy
- Screenplay by: Steve Meerson; Peter Krikes; Nicholas Meyer; Harve Bennett
- Story by: Harve Bennett; Leonard Nimoy
- Based on: Star Trek by Gene Roddenberry
- Produced by: Harve Bennett
- Starring: William Shatner; Leonard Nimoy; DeForest Kelley; James Doohan; George Takei; Walter Koenig; Nichelle Nichols
- Cinematography: Donald Peterman
- Edited by: Peter E. Berger
- Music by: Leonard Rosenman
- Production company: Paramount Pictures
- Distributed by: Paramount Pictures
- Release date: November 26, 1986
- Running time: 122 minutes
- Country: United States
- Language: English
- Budget: $21–25 million
- Box office: $133 million

Star Trek IV: The Voyage Home is a 1986 American science fiction film, the fourth installment in the Star Trek film franchise based on the television series Star Trek. The second film directed by Leonard Nimoy, it completes the story arc begun in Star Trek II: The Wrath of Khan (1982) and continued in Star Trek III: The Search for Spock (1984). Intent on returning home to Earth to face consequences for their actions in the previous film, the crew of the USS Enterprise finds the planet in grave danger from an alien probe attempting to contact now-extinct humpback whales. The crew travel to Earth's past to find whales who can answer the probe's call.

After directing The Search for Spock, Nimoy was asked to direct the next feature, and given greater freedom regarding the film's content. Nimoy and producer Harve Bennett conceived a story with an environmental message and no clear-cut villain. Dissatisfied with the first screenplay produced by Steve Meerson and Peter Krikes, Paramount Pictures hired The Wrath of Khan writer and director Nicholas Meyer. Meyer and Bennett divided the story between them and wrote different parts of the script, requiring approval from Nimoy, lead actor William Shatner, and executives at Paramount.

Principal photography commenced on February 24, 1986. Unlike previous Star Trek films, The Voyage Home was shot extensively on location, using many real settings and buildings for scenes set around and in the city of San Francisco. Special effects firm Industrial Light & Magic assisted in post-production and the film's special effects. Few of the humpback whales in the film were real. ILM devised full-size animatronics and small motorized models to stand in for the real creatures. The film was dedicated to the crew of the Space Shuttle Challenger, which broke up 73 seconds after takeoff on the morning of January 28, 1986.

The Voyage Home was released on November 26, 1986, in North America by Paramount Pictures, and became the top-grossing film at the weekend box office. The film's humor, acting, direction, special effects and unconventional story were well received by critics, fans of the series, and the general audience. It was financially successful, grossing $133 million worldwide, and earned several awards and four Academy Award nominations for cinematography and sound. It was followed by Star Trek V: The Final Frontier in 1989.

== Plot ==
In 2286, an enormous cylindrical probe moves through space, sending out an indecipherable signal and disabling the power of every ship it passes. As it takes up orbit around Earth, its signal disables the global power grid and generates planetary storms, creating catastrophic, sun-blocking cloud cover. Starfleet Command sends out a planetary distress call and warns all space-faring vessels not to approach Earth.

On the planet Vulcan, the former officers of the late USS Enterprise are living in exile. Accompanied by the Vulcan Spock, still recovering from his resurrection, (Note: As depicted in Star Trek III: The Search for Spock (1984)) the crew take their captured Klingon Bird of Prey and return to Earth to face trial for their actions. Receiving Starfleet's warning, Spock determines that the probe's signal matches the song of extinct humpback whales and that the object will continue to wreak havoc until its call is answered. The crew uses their ship to travel back in time via a slingshot maneuver around the Sun, planning to return with a whale to answer the alien signal.

Arriving in 1986, the crew finds their ship's power drained by the time travel maneuver. Hiding the ship in San Francisco's Golden Gate Park using its cloaking device, the crew split up to accomplish several tasks: Admiral James T. Kirk and Spock attempt to locate humpback whales, while Montgomery Scott, Leonard McCoy, and Hikaru Sulu construct a tank to hold the whales they need for a return to the 23rd century. Uhura and Pavel Chekov are tasked to find a nuclear reactor, whose energy leakage can be collected and used to regenerate the decaying dilithium crystals.

Kirk and Spock discover a pair of humpback whales in the care of Dr. Gillian Taylor at a Sausalito aquarium and learn they will soon be released into the wild. Kirk tells her of his mission and asks for the tracking frequency for the whales, but she refuses to cooperate. Meanwhile, Scott and McCoy trade the formula of transparent aluminum for the materials needed for the whale tank. At the same time, Sulu secures the use of a "Huey" helicopter to transport them. Uhura and Chekov locate a nuclear-powered ship, the aircraft carrier Enterprise. They collect the power they need but are discovered on board. Uhura is beamed out, but Chekov is captured, interrogated (under the assumption he is a Soviet spy), and subsequently severely injured in an escape attempt.

Gillian learns the whales have been released early and goes to Kirk for assistance. Gillian, Kirk, and McCoy rescue Chekov from a nearby hospital and return to the now-recharged Bird of Prey. After saving the whales from whalers and transporting them aboard, the crew returns with Gillian to their own time. On approaching Earth, the ship loses power due to the alien probe and crash-lands into the waters of San Francisco Bay. Once released from near-drowning, the whales respond to the probe's signal, causing the object to reverse its effects on Earth and return to the depths of space.

Later, the Enterprise crew stand judgment before the Federation Council, which acknowledges the crew's part in saving the planet, and drops all pending charges except the one against Kirk, for disobeying a superior officer. Kirk is demoted to the rank of captain, but as a furtive reward for his heroics, he is returned to the command of a starship. Kirk and Gillian part ways, as she has been assigned to a science vessel by Starfleet. Spock's father Sarek finally accepts his son's earlier choice to enter Starfleet, further mending their broken relationship. The crew discovers they have been awarded the newly christened USS Enterprise (NCC-1701-A) and leaves on a shakedown mission.

== Cast ==
- William Shatner as Admiral James T. Kirk, former captain of the Enterprise. Shatner was unwilling to reprise the role of Kirk until he received a salary of $2 million and the promise of directing the next film. Shatner described The Voyage Home's comic quality as one "that verges on tongue-in-cheek but isn't; it's as though the characters within the play have a great deal of joy about themselves, a joy of living [and] you play it with the reality you would in a kitchen-sink drama written for today's life".
- Leonard Nimoy as Spock, who was resurrected by the effects of the Genesis planet and had his "living spirit" restored to his body in the previous film.
- DeForest Kelley as Doctor Leonard McCoy, who is given many of the film's comedic lines; Kelley's biographer Terry Lee Rioux wrote that in the film "he seemed to be playing straight man to himself."
- James Doohan as Montgomery Scott. On Earth, McCoy was paired with engineer Scott, as producer Harve Bennett felt that Kelley worked well with Doohan's "old vaudeville comic".
- Catherine Hicks plays Dr. Gillian Taylor, a cetologist on 20th-century Earth. During production, a rumor circulated that the part had been created after Shatner demanded a love interest, a regular aspect of the television series that was absent from the first three films. Writer Nicholas Meyer denied this, saying that the inspiration for Taylor came from a biologist featured in a National Geographic documentary about whales. Nimoy chose Hicks after inviting her to lunch with Shatner and witnessing a chemistry between the two. The role was originally written for Eddie Murphy as an astrophysicist at Berkeley.
- Majel Barrett as Christine Chapel, the director of Starfleet Command's medical services. Many of her scenes—some reportedly very large—were omitted in the final cut, angering the actress. Her final role in the film consists of one line of dialogue and a reaction shot.
- Mark Lenard and Jane Wyatt play Spock's parents, Ambassador Sarek and Amanda Grayson, respectively, both reprising the roles they had previously played in the 1967 episode "Journey to Babel". Wyatt commented that, although she generally disliked working with actors who were directing, she found Nimoy an exception because he could concentrate on being part of the cast as well as setting up the crew.
- Robin Curtis as Saavik, a Starfleet lieutenant. Saavik's role is minimal in the film—originally, she was intended to remain behind on Vulcan because she was pregnant after she had mated with the younger Spock in Star Trek III: The Search for Spock. In the final cut of the film, all references to her condition were dropped.
- Walter Koenig as Commander Pavel Chekov. Koenig commented that Chekov was a "delight" to play in this film because he worked best in comedic situations.

The other members of the Enterprise crew include George Takei as helmsman Hikaru Sulu, and Nichelle Nichols as Uhura. Alex Henteloff plays Dr. Nichols, plant manager of Plexicorp. Madge Sinclair makes an uncredited appearance as captain of the USS Saratoga (the first female Federation starship captain to appear in Star Trek). Musician Jane Wiedlin and tennis player Vijay Amritraj appear as Starfleet officers seen briefly on video screens at Starfleet Command; Wiedlin's character has since been identified by the name Trillya. John Schuck appears as a Klingon ambassador, Robert Ellenstein as the Federation President, Michael Berryman as an alien display officer at Starfleet Command, and Brock Peters as Fleet Admiral Cartwright. Grace Lee Whitney reprises her role as Janice Rand from the original television series.

== Production ==
=== Development ===
Before Star Trek III: The Search for Spock was released, its director Leonard Nimoy was asked to return to direct the next film in the Star Trek franchise. Whereas Nimoy had been under certain constraints in filming the previous picture, Paramount Pictures gave the director greater freedom for the sequel. "[Paramount] said flat out that they wanted my vision," Nimoy recalled. In contrast to the drama-heavy and operatic events of the three previous Star Trek features, Nimoy and producer Harve Bennett wanted a lighter movie that did not have a clear-cut villain. As William Shatner was unwilling to return, Nimoy and Bennett spent eight months considering a prequel concept by Ralph Winter about the characters at Starfleet Academy, before Shatner received a pay increase and signed on to star. Nimoy and Shatner each received $2.5 million for the film, less than their original demands, but the film cast's rising salaries caused Paramount to create a new television series entitled Star Trek: The Next Generation (1987), with less-expensive, lesser-known actors.

Despite Shatner's doubts, Nimoy and Bennett selected a time travel story in which the Enterprise crew encounters a problem that could be fixed by something only available in the present day (the Star Trek characters' past). They considered ideas about violin makers and oil drillers or a disease that had its cure destroyed with the rainforests. "But the depiction of thousands of sick and dying people seemed rather gruesome for our light-hearted film, and the thought of our crew taking a 600-year round trip just to bring back a snail darter wasn't all that thrilling," explained Nimoy. The director read a book on extinct animals and conceived the storyline that was eventually adopted. Nimoy hit upon the idea of humpback whales after talking with a friend—their song added mystery to the story, and their size added logistical challenges the heroes would have to overcome.

Nimoy approached Beverly Hills Cop writer Daniel Petrie Jr. to write the screenplay when a concept that executive producer Jeffrey Katzenberg described as "either the best or worst idea in the world" arose—Star Trek fan Eddie Murphy wanted a starring role. Nimoy and Murphy acknowledged his part would attract non-Star Trek fans to the franchise following the rising popularity of Murphy, but it also meant the film might be ridiculed. Steve Meerson and Peter Krikes were hired to write a script with Murphy as a college professor who believes in aliens and likes to play whale songs. Murphy disliked the part, and chose to make The Golden Child. Paramount was also averse to the idea of combining two of their strongest franchises of the era, fearing that a failure could damage them both. The character intended for Murphy was combined with those of a marine biologist and a female reporter to become Gillian Taylor.

Paramount was dissatisfied with the script, so its head of production Dawn Steel asked Nicholas Meyer, the writer and director of Star Trek II: The Wrath of Khan, to help rewrite it. Meyer never read the earlier script, reasoning it pointless to do so since the content had no appeal to the studio. He and Bennett split the task of conceiving the plot between them. Bennett wrote the first quarter of the story, up to the point where the crew goes back in time. Meyer wrote the story's middle portion, taking place on 20th-century Earth, and Bennett handled the ending. After 12 days of writing, Meyer and Bennett combined their separate portions. In this version, Gillian Taylor stays on 1986's Earth and vows to ensure the survival of the humpback whale despite the paradox it could create. Meyer preferred this "righter ending" to the film version, explaining "the end in the movie detracts from the importance of people in the present taking the responsibility for the ecology and preventing problems of the future by doing something today, rather than catering to the fantasy desires of being able to be transported in time to the near-utopian future." Meyer and Bennett cut out Krikes's and Meerson's idea of having the Klingon Bird-of-Prey appear over the Super Bowl halftime show and the hint that Saavik remained on Vulcan because she was pregnant with Spock's child. The former two were originally credited with the script, but after Krikes and Meerson filed for arbitration with the Writers Guild of America they were awarded credit as well, a decision that embittered Meyer for years, since he felt that if anyone deserved co-credit with him it was Bennett alone.

Nimoy said Meyer gave the script "the kind of humor and social comment, gadfly attitude I very much wanted". He added that his vision was for "no dying, no fighting, no shooting, no photon torpedoes, no phaser blasts, no stereotypical bad guy. I wanted people to really have a great time watching this film [and] if somewhere in the mix we lobbed a couple of big ideas at them, well, then that would be even better." One of Meyer's earlier films, Time After Time, was largely based in San Francisco. When he was told by the producers that The Voyage Home had to be set in the same city, he took the opportunity to comment upon cultural aspects not covered by his earlier film, such as punk rock—The Voyage Home's scene where Kirk and Spock meet an annoying punk rocker was based on a similar scene cut from Time After Time.

Meyer found writing the script a smooth process. He would write a few pages, show it to Nimoy and Bennett for consultation, and return to his office to write some more. Once Nimoy, Bennett, and Meyer were happy, they showed the script to Shatner, who offered his own notes for another round of rewrites. The completed script was shown to Paramount executives, who were very pleased.

=== Design ===
Industrial Light & Magic (ILM) was responsible for The Voyage Home's model design and optical effects. The alien probe was the responsibility of ILM's model shop, which brought in outside help like illustrator Ralph McQuarrie for concept art. The modelmakers started with art director Nilo Rodis' basic design, a simple cylinder with whalelike qualities. The prototype was covered with barnacles and colored. The ball-shaped antenna that juts out from the bottom of the probe was created out of a piece of irrigation pipe; internal machinery turned the device. Three sizes of the "whale probe" were created; the primary eight-foot (2.4 m) probe model was supplemented by a smaller model for wide shots and a large 20-foot (6.1 m) model that used forced perspective to give the probe the illusion of massive dimensions.

The effects crew focused on using in-camera tricks to realize the probe; post-production effects were time-consuming, so lighting effects were done on stage while filming. Model shop supervisor Jeff Mann filled the probe's antenna with tube lamps and halogen bulbs that were turned on in sequence for different exposures; three different camera passes for each exposure were combined for the final effect. After watching the first shot, the team found the original, whalelike probe design lacking in menace. The modelmakers repainted the probe a shiny black, pockmarked its surface for greater texture and interest, and re-shot the scene. Although they wanted to avoid post-production effects work, the opticals team had to recolor the antenna ball in a blue hue, as the original orange looked too much like a spinning basketball.

Aside from the probe, The Voyage Home required no new starship designs. The USS Saratoga, the first Federation starship disabled by the probe, was the USS Reliant model from The Wrath of Khan. The Bird-of-Prey model from The Search for Spock was reused, but ILM built additional sturdy versions for The Voyage Home's action sequences. The inside of the Bird-of-Prey was represented by a different set than The Search for Spock, but the designers made sure to adhere to a sharp and alien architectural aesthetic. To give the set a smokier, atmospheric look, the designers rigged display and instrumentation lights to be bright enough that they could light the characters, rather than relying on ambient or rigged lighting. While Paramount had instructed ILM to trash the large Spacedock model created for The Search for Spock, the team had been loath to discard the complicated model and its miles of fiber optic lighting. When The Voyage Home called for the return of Spacedock, ILM had only to reassemble the model from storage.

Robert Fletcher served as costume designer for the film. During the Earth-based scenes, Kirk and his crew continue to wear their 23rd-century clothing. Nimoy debated whether the crew should change costumes, but after seeing how people in San Francisco are dressed, he decided they would still fit in.

=== Filming ===
Nimoy chose Donald Peterman, ASC, as director of photography. Nimoy said he regarded the cinematographer as a fellow artist, and that it was important for them to agree on "a certain look" that Peterman was committed to delivering. Nimoy had seen Peterman's work and felt it was more nuanced than simply lighting a scene and capturing an image.

The film's opening scenes aboard the starship Saratoga were the first to be shot; principal photography commenced on February 24, 1986. The set was a redress of the science vessel Grissom's bridge from The Search for Spock, in turn a redress of the Enterprise bridge created for The Motion Picture. The scenes were filmed first to allow time for the set to be revamped as the bridge of the new Enterprise-A at the end of filming.

As with previous Star Trek films, existing props and footage were reused where possible to save money, though The Voyage Home required less of this than previous films. The Earth Spacedock interiors and control booth sets were reused from The Search for Spock, although the computer monitors in these scenes featured new graphics—the old reels had deteriorated in storage. Stock footage of the destruction of the Enterprise and the Bird-of-Prey's movement through space were reused. While the Bird-of-Prey bridge was a completely new design, other parts of the craft's interior were also redresses; the computer room was a modification of the reactor room where Spock died in The Wrath of Khan. After all other Bird-of-Prey bridge scenes were completed, the entire set was painted white for one shot that transitioned into a dream sequence during the time travel.

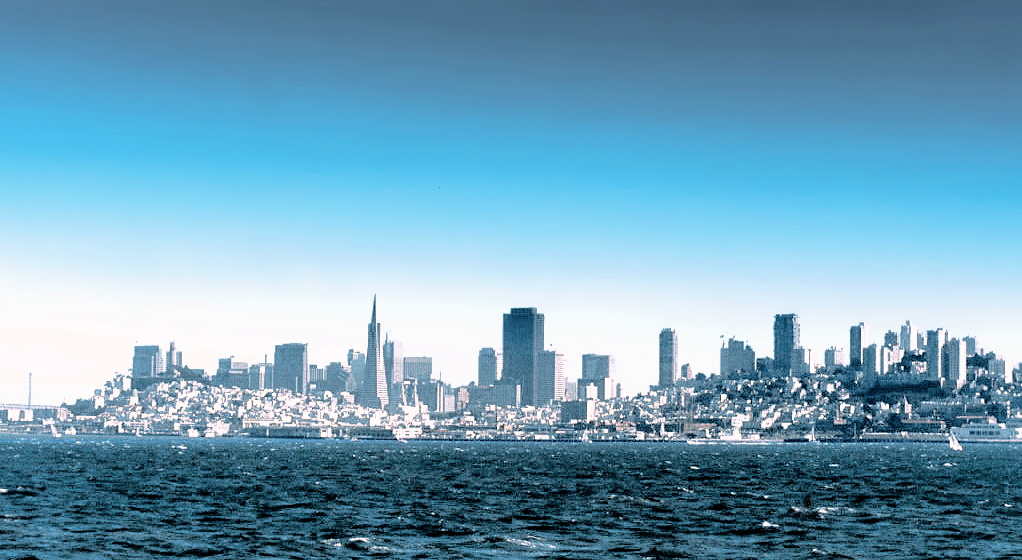
The San Francisco skyline pictured in 1989

The Voyage Home was the first Star Trek film to extensively film on location—only one day was spent doing so in The Search for Spock. Much of the production was filmed in and around San Francisco during ten days of shooting. The production wanted to film scenes that were readily identifiable as the city. The use of extensive location shooting caused logistical problems, such as a scene in which Kirk is nearly run over by an irate cab driver requiring 12–15 cars to be repositioned if the shot was incorrect, taking a half-hour to reshoot. Other scenes were filmed in the city but used sets rather than real locations, such as an Italian restaurant where Taylor and Kirk eat. In the film, the Bird-of-Prey lands cloaked in Golden Gate Park, surprising trashmen who flee the scene in their truck. The production had planned to film in the real park, where they had filmed scenes for The Wrath of Khan, but heavy rains before the day of shooting prevented it—the garbage truck would have become bogged down in the mud. Will Rogers Park in western Los Angeles was used instead.

When Kirk and Spock are traveling on a public bus, they encounter a punk rocker blaring his music on a boom box, to the discomfort of everyone around him. Spock takes matters into his own hands and performs a Vulcan nerve pinch. Part of the inspiration for the scene came from Nimoy's personal experiences with a similar character on the streets of New York: "[I was struck] by the arrogance of it, the aggressiveness of it, and I thought if I was Spock I'd pinch his brains out!" On learning about the scene, Kirk Thatcher, an associate producer on the film, convinced Nimoy to let him play the role; Thatcher shaved his hair into a mohawk and bought clothes to complete the part. Credited as "punk on bus", Thatcher (along with sound designer Mark Mangini) also wrote and recorded "I Hate You", the song in the scene, and it was his idea to have the punk – rendered unconscious by the pinch – hit the stereo and turn it off with his face. Thatcher reprised the role 36 years later, in the 2022 episode "The Watcher", of Star Trek: Picard, albeit a matured "Punk on the Bus" who apologizes to Seven of Nine and turns off his boom box when she asks.

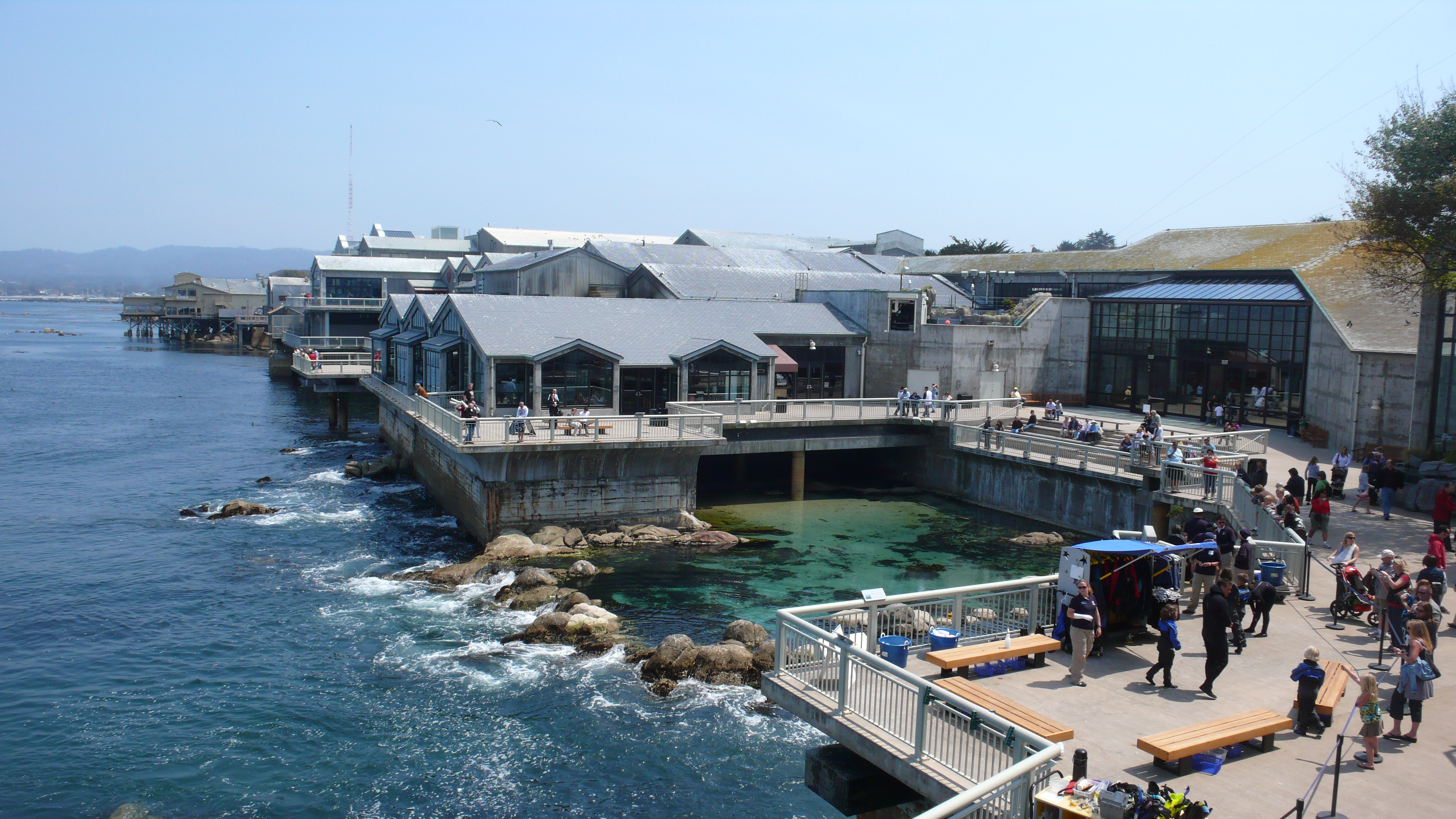
The Monterey Bay Aquarium, viewed from the back. The shallow area behind the rocks was turned into a whale tank via special effects; other changes included the addition of the San Francisco skyline in the background.

Much of the Cetacean Institute, Taylor's workplace, was created by using the real-life Monterey Bay Aquarium. A holding tank for the whales was added via special effects to the Aquarium's exterior. For close-ups of the characters as they watched the whales in the tank, the Aquarium's walls and railings were measured and replicated for a set on the Paramount parking lot. One scene takes place by a large glass through which observers view the whales—and Spock's initiation of a mind meld—underwater. Footage of the actors shot in front of them as they reacted to a brick wall in the Aquarium was combined with shots taken from their rear as they stood in front of a large blue screen at ILM to produce this scene. The footage of Spock's melding with the whales was shot weeks later in a large water tank used to train astronauts for weightlessness.

In the film, Uhura and Chekov visit the aircraft carrier USS Enterprise. The real Enterprise, out at sea at the time, was unavailable for filming, so the non-nuclear-powered carrier USS Ranger (CV-61) was used. Oakland International Airport was used for the foreground element of Starfleet Headquarters. Scenes in the San Francisco Bay were shot at a tank on Paramount's backlot.

The scene in which Uhura and Chekov question passersby about the location of nuclear vessels was filmed with a hidden camera. However, the people with whom Koenig and Nichols speak were extras hired off the street for that day's shooting and, despite legends to the contrary, knew they were being filmed. In an interview with StarTrek.com, Layla Sarakalo, the extra who said, "I don't know if I know the answer to that... I think it's across the bay, in Alameda," stated that after her car was impounded because she missed the warnings to move it for the filming, she approached the assistant director about appearing with the other extras, hoping to be paid enough to get her car out of impoundment. She had been told to act naturally, and so she answered them and the filmmakers kept her response in the film, though she had to be inducted into the Screen Actors Guild in order for her lines to be kept.

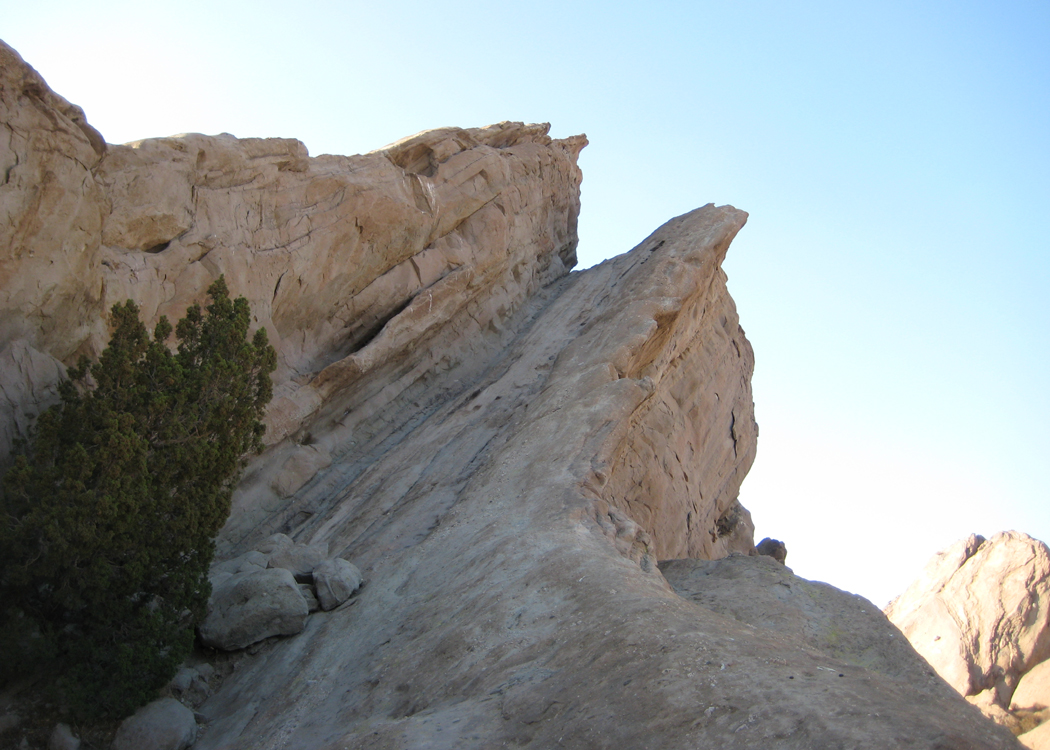
Vasquez Rocks was used as a stand-in for the alien world of Vulcan. The rocks had also appeared in TOS and many other TV shows and movies.

Vulcan and the Bird-of-Prey exterior was created with a combination of matte paintings and a soundstage. Nimoy had searched for a suitable location for the scene of the Enterprise crew's preparations to return to Earth, but various locations did not work, so the scene was instead filmed on a Paramount backlot. The production had to mask the fact that production buildings were 30 feet (9.1 m) away. A wide-angle shot of Spock on the edge of a cliff overlooking the scene was filmed at Vasquez Rocks, a park north of Los Angeles. The Federation council chamber was a large set filled with representatives from many alien races. Production designer Jack T. Collis economized by building the set with only one end; reverse angle shots used the same piece of wall. The positions of the Federation President's podium and the actors on the seats were switched for each shot. Since The Voyage Home was the first Star Trek film to show the operations at Starfleet Command, Bennett and Nimoy visited NASA's Jet Propulsion Laboratory to learn how a real deep space command center might look and operate. Among the resulting set's features was a large central desk with video monitors that the production team nicknamed "the pool table"; the prop later became a fixture in USS Enterprise-D's engine room on the television series Star Trek: The Next Generation.

=== Effects ===
Nimoy approached ILM early in development and helped create storyboards for the optical effects sequences. Many shots used matte paintings to extend backgrounds and create establishing shots without the cost of building a set. Matte supervisor Chris Evans attempted to create paintings that felt less contrived and more real—while the natural instinct of filmmaking is to place important elements in an orderly fashion, Evans said that photographers would "shoot things that [...] are odd in some way" and end up with results that look natural instead. The task of establishing the location and atmosphere at Starfleet Headquarters fell to the matte department, who had to make it feel like a bustling futuristic version of San Francisco. The matte personnel and Ralph McQuarrie provided design input. The designers decided to make actors in the foreground more prominent, and filmed them on a large area of smooth concrete runway at the Oakland Airport. Elements like a shuttlecraft that thirty extras appeared to interact with were also mattes blended to appear as if they were sitting by the actors. Ultimately the artists were not satisfied with how the shot turned out; matte photography supervisor Craig Barron believed that there were too many elements in the scene.

The scenes of the Bird-of-Prey on Vulcan were combinations of live-action footage—actors on a set in the Paramount parking lot that was covered with clay and used backdrops—and matte paintings for the ship itself and harsh background terrain. The scene of the ship's departure from Vulcan for Earth was more difficult to accomplish, because the camera pans behind live-action characters to follow the ship as it leaves the atmosphere, and other items like flaming pillars and a flaring sun had to be integrated into the shot. Rather than try to match and combine camera pans of each element, each component was shot with a static camera and the pan was added to the resulting composite by a motion control camera. The sun (a light bulb focused by a convex lens) was shot in different passes to create realistic light effects on the Bird-of-Prey without having the light bleed around other elements in the shot.

The script called for the probe to vaporize the Earth's oceans, generating heavy cloud cover. While effects cinematographer Don Dow wanted to go to sea and record plumes of water created by exploding detonating cords in the water, the team decided to create the probe's climatic effect in another way after a government fishing agency voiced concerns for the welfare of marine life in the area. The team used a combination of baking soda and cloud tank effects. The swirling mist created by the water-filled tank was shot on black velvet, and color and dynamic swirls were added by injecting paint into the tank. These shots were composited onto a painting of the Earth along with overlaid lightning effects, created by double-exposing lights as they moved across the screen.

The Bird-of-Prey's travel through time was one of the most difficult effects sequences of the film. While ILM was experienced in creating the streaking warp effect they used for previous films, the sequence required the camera to trail a sustained warp effect as the Bird-of-Prey rounded the sun. Matching the effect to the model was accomplished through trial-and-error guesswork. The team did not have the time to wait for the animation department to create the sun for this shot. Assistant cameraman Pete Kozachic devised a way of creating the sun on-stage. He placed two sheets of textured plexiglass next to each other and backlit them with a powerful yellow light. The rig was rotated on a circular track and the sheet in front created a moire pattern as its position shifted. Animator John Knoll added solar flare effects to complete the look; Dow recalled that the effect came close to matching footage of the sun taken by the Jet Propulsion Laboratory.

Traveling through time, Kirk and crew experience what author Jody Duncan Shay termed a "dreamlike state". The script's only direction for the effect was, "Now [they] go through time"; Nimoy and McQuarrie envisioned Kirk's dream as a montage of bizarre images. The filmmakers decided early on that part of the dream sequence would use computer-generated animation to give it an unreal quality divorced from the rest of the film. ILM worked from McQuarrie's storyboards and created a rough mock-up or animatic to show Nimoy and hone the direction of the sequence. For the very beginning of the dream, the inside of the Bird-of-Prey bridge was painted stark white. Part of the final sequence involved morphing the heads of the Enterprise crew into one another, ILM digitizing the cast members' heads using a 3-D scanning technology developed by Cyberware and using the resulting data for the computer models. Because each head model had the same number of key points of reference, transforming one character into another was simple, but more difficult, the animators recalled, was ensuring that the transformation looked "pleasing" and not "grotesque". The resulting thirty seconds of footage took weeks to render, the department using every spare computer they could find to help in the processing chores. ILM's stage, optical, and matte departments collaborated to complete other shots for the dream sequence. The shot of a man's fall to Earth was created by filming a small puppet on bluescreen. Shots of liquid nitrogen composited behind the puppet gave the impression of smoke. The background plate of the planet was a large matte that allowed the camera to zoom in very close. The final shot of marshy terrain was practical and required no effects.

The filmmakers knew from the beginning of production that the whales were their biggest effects concern; Dow recalled that they were prepared to change to another animal in case creating the whales proved too difficult. When Humphrey the Whale wandered into the San Francisco Bay, Dow and his camera crew attempted to gather usable footage of the humpback but failed to do so. Other footage of real humpbacks either did not exist on 35 mm film or would have been difficult to match to specific actions required by the script. Compositing miniatures shot against bluescreen on top of water backgrounds would not have provided realistic play of light. Creating full-size mechanical whales on tracks would severely limit the types of angles and shots. To solve the whale problem, Rodis hired robotics expert Walt Conti. While Conti was not experienced in film, Rodis believed his background in engineering and design made him well equipped for Rodis' planned solution: the creation of independent and self-contained miniature whale models.

After watching footage of whale movement, Conti determined that the models could be simplified by making the front of the whale entirely rigid, relying on the tail and fins for movement. Conti showed footage of the operation of a 30-inch (76 cm) prototype to Paramount executives, who according to Conti, "loved it... It really knocked them out." With Paramount's approval, ILM hired marine author, conservationist and illustrator Pieter Folkens to sculpt a realistic whale exterior. ILM decided on a finished model size of four feet (1.2 m)—the size prevented delicate components like the tail from buckling under stress—and fitted it with mechanics and radio equipment required for control and operation. To prevent water from ruining the whale's electronics, the modelmakers sealed every individual mechanical component rather than attempting to waterproof the entire whale. Balloons and lead weights were added to achieve the proper balance and buoyancy. The finished models were put in the swimming pool of Serra High School in San Mateo, California, for two weeks of shooting; the operation of the whales required four handlers and divers with video cameras to help set up the shots. Accurately controlling the whales was difficult because of the murky water—ILM added diatomaceous earth to the water to match realistic ocean visibility. For a few shots, such as the whales' breaching the water towards the end of the film, the creatures were represented by life-size animatronics shot at Paramount.

Models of the starship USS Enterprise were destroyed in the previous film partly because visual effects supervisor Ken Ralston wanted to build a "more state-of-the-art ship for the next film", but the filmmakers made the less costly decision to have the crew return to serve on the duplicate USS Enterprise-A, and six weeks were spent repairing and repainting the old model. A travel pod from Star Trek: The Motion Picture was also reused for the ending, although the 20-foot-long (6.1 m) interior set had to be rebuilt. Graphic designer Michael Okuda designed smooth controls with backlit displays for the Federation. Dubbed "Okudagrams", the system was also used for displays on the Klingon ship, though the buttons were larger.

=== Sound and music ===
James Horner, composer for The Wrath of Khan and The Search for Spock, declined to return for The Voyage Home. Nimoy turned to his friend Leonard Rosenman, who had written the music to Fantastic Voyage, Ralph Bakshi's The Lord of the Rings, and two Planet of the Apes sequels. Rosenman wrote an arrangement of Alexander Courage's Star Trek television theme as the title music for The Voyage Home, but Nimoy requested an original composition. Music critic Jeff Bond writes, "The final result was one of the most unusual Star Trek movie themes," consisting of a six-note theme and variations set against a repetitious four-note brass motif; the theme's bridge borrows content from Rosenman's "Frodo March" for The Lord of the Rings. A cycle of fifths is heard for the second subject. The melody is played in the beginning of the film on Vulcan and the scenes of Taylor's search for Kirk to help find her whales.

The Earth-based setting of the filming gave Rosenman leeway to write a variety of music in different styles. Nimoy intended the crew's introduction to the streets of San Francisco to be accompanied by something reminiscent of George Gershwin, but Rosenman changed the director's mind, and the scene was scored with a contemporary jazz fusion piece by Yellowjackets. When Chekov flees detention aboard the aircraft carrier, Rosenman wrote a bright cue that incorporates classical Russian compositions. The music for the escape from the hospital was done in a baroque style. More familiar Rosenman compositions include the action music for the face off between the Bird-of-Prey and a whaling ship in open water, and the atmospheric music (reminiscent of the composer's work in Fantastic Voyage) during the probe's communication. After the probe leaves, a Vivaldiesque "whale fugue" begins. The first sighting of the Enterprise-A uses the Alexander Courage theme before the end titles.

Mark Mangini served as The Voyage Home's sound designer. He described it as different from working on many other films because Nimoy appreciated the role of sound effects and made sure that they were prominent in the film. Since many sounds familiar to Star Trek had been established—the Bird-of-Prey's cloaking device, the transporter beam, et al.—Mangini focused on making only small changes to them. The most important sounds were those of the whales and the probe. Mangini's brother lived near biologist Roger Payne, who had recordings of whale song. Mangini went through the tapes and chose sounds that could be mixed to suggest conversation and language. The probe's screeching calls were the whale song in distorted form. The humpback's communication with the probe at the climax of the film contained no dramatic music, meaning that Mangini's sounds had to stand alone. He recalled that he had difficulty with envisioning how the scene would unfold, leading Bennett to perform a puppet show to explain.

It was at Bennett's suggestion that Paramount studio heads asked Nimoy to create subtitles for the probe's transmission at the start of the film and for the climactic dialogue with the whales. Both Nimoy and Meyer were adamantly against using any subtitles, and they eventually prevailed.

Nimoy and the other producers were unhappy with Mangini's attempts to create the probe's droning operating noise and, after more than a dozen attempts, the sound designer finally asked Nimoy what he thought the probe should sound like. Mangini recorded Nimoy's guttural "wub-wub-wub" response, distorted it with "just the tiniest bit of dressing", and used it as the final sound.

The punk music during the bus scene was written by Thatcher after he learned that the sound for the scene would be by "Duran Duran, or whoever" and not "raw" and authentic punk. Thatcher collaborated with Mangini and two sound editors who were in punk bands to create their own music. They decided that punk distilled down to the sentiment of "I hate you", and wrote a song centered on the theme. Recording in the sound studio as originally planned produced too clean a sound, so they moved to the outside hallway and recorded the song in one take using cheap microphones to create a distorted sound. The song was also used in Paramount's Back to the Beach.

== Reception ==
=== Release ===
The Voyage Home opened theatrically in North America on Thanksgiving weekend, November 26, 1986. Since Star Trek had traditionally performed poorly internationally, the producers created a special trailer for foreign markets that de-emphasized the Star Trek part of the title, as well as retelling the events of The Wrath of Khan and The Search for Spock. Winter recalled that the marketing did not seem to make a difference. The Voyage Home was the first Star Trek film shown in the Soviet Union, screened by the World Wildlife Fund on June 26, 1987, in Moscow to celebrate a ban on whaling. Attending the screening with Nimoy, Bennett was amazed the film proved as entertaining to the Russians as it did with American audiences; he said, "The single most rewarding moment of my Star Trek life" was when the Moscow audience applauded at McCoy's line, "The bureaucratic mentality is the only constant in the universe. We'll get a freighter." Bennett believed it was a clear "messenger of what was to come".

Vonda N. McIntyre wrote a novelization that was released at the same time as the film. It was the biggest tie-in novel published by Pocket Books, and spent eight weeks on The New York Times bestseller list, peaking at #3. MCA Records released the film's soundtrack November 26, 1986.

In its first week, The Voyage Home ended Crocodile Dundee's eight-week reign of the American box office. The Star Trek film made $39.6 million in its first five days of release, exceeding The Search for Spock's opening by $14 million. Ultimately, the film grossed a global total of $133 million against its $21–25 million cost. In six weeks, The Voyage Home sold $81.3 million in tickets, more than the franchise's second or third film, and almost as much as Star Trek: The Motion Picture. The film was a major commercial success for Paramount, which released five of the top ten films of the year, and garnered 22 percent of all money taken in at American theaters. Much of the credit for Paramount's success was given to chairman Frank Mancuso Sr., who moved The Voyage Home's release from Christmas to Thanksgiving after research showed that the film might draw filmgoers away from The Golden Child.

=== Critical response ===
The Voyage Home received mostly positive reviews—Nimoy called it the most well received of all Star Trek films made at that point—and it appealed to general audiences in addition to franchise fans. Audiences polled by CinemaScore gave the film an average grade of "A+" on an A+ to F scale. The movie was a "loose, jovial, immensely pleasurable Christmas entertainment" for The Washington Post's Paul Attanasio, and a retrospective BBC review called the film "one of the series' strongest episodes and proof that the franchise could weather the absence of space-bound action and the iconic USS Enterprise, and still be highly enjoyable". Although Janet Maslin of The New York Times admitted the film's plot was "demented", she wrote that the film "has done a great deal to ensure the series' longevity". Rushworth Kidder of the Christian Science Monitor praised the film for giving audiences a view of their modern life from a different perspective (the mooreeffoc effect), while simultaneously proving that a film does not need to have murder, violence, innuendo or even a main villain for dramatic storytelling.

The film's "fish out of water" comedy and acting were mostly lauded. The Courier Mail wrote that the film was funnier than its predecessors and, while not "flippant", a sense of humor was revealed through the efforts of the cast, writers and director. Newsweek's David Ansen considered The Voyage Home not only the most light-hearted of the movie franchise, but the most true in spirit to the original television series. A more negative review was offered by Liam Lacey of The Globe and Mail, who wrote that under Nimoy's "choppy" direction there was a lack of comic timing paired with feeble humor. American film critic Pauline Kael commented, "The crewmates are supposed to be technical wizards of the 23rd century, but they deliver their lines as if they were ancient tortoises who had to get their heads out and up before they could say anything. It's a relief to hear two San Francisco garbagemen talk, because there's some energy in their voices, and when Madge Sinclair turns up for a minute, as the captain of the S. S. Saratoga, her crisp, urgent tone is like a handclap."

The special effects were generally well received; critics for The Sydney Morning Herald and Courier Mail noted that the effects played a lesser role in the film compared to the characters and dialogue. Similarly, USA Today felt the lack of special effects allowed the cast to "prove themselves more capable actors than ever before". Maslin wrote that Nimoy's technical direction left "much to be desired" (pointing out a special effects scene where the Bird-of-Prey does not cast a shadow on the whaling ship as a mistake), but his "unmistakable" sincerity made up for these issues.

The Voyage Home garnered 11 nominations at the 14th annual Saturn Awards, tying Aliens for most nominations. Nimoy and Shatner were nominated for best actor for their roles, and Catherine Hicks was nominated for best supporting actress. At the 59th Academy Awards, The Voyage Home was nominated for Best Cinematography, Sound (Terry Porter, David J. Hudson, Mel Metcalfe and Gene Cantamessa), Sound Effects Editing, and Original Score.

In 2018, Popular Mechanics ranked the scene where Chekov talks about "nuclear wessels" the 50th-greatest moment in science fiction.

=== Home media ===
The Voyage Home was first released on VHS home media on September 30, 1987. Paramount Home Video spent $20 million marketing the film's release alongside 10 episodes of The Original Series. The video sold hundreds of thousands of copies in the United States and Canadian markets, and was in the top ten rankings for sales and rentals in December and January 1988. Paramount re-released the film on March 12, 1992, with Fatal Attraction as part of a "Director's Series", these editions having additional commentary and being presented in a widescreen letterboxed format to preserve the films' original cinematography. Nimoy was interviewed on the Paramount lots and discussed his acting career as well as his favorable opinion of the widescreen format.

A "bare bones" DVD of the film was released on November 9, 1999. Aside from the film, the contents include the original theatrical trailer and the introduction from the "Director's Series" VHS release. Three-and-a-half years later, a two-disc "Collector's Edition" was released with supplemental material and the same video transfer as the original DVD release. Among other special features, it contains a text commentary by Michael Okuda and an audio commentary from director Leonard Nimoy and star William Shatner.

The film was released on Blu-ray Disc in May 2009 to coincide with the new Star Trek feature, along with the other five films that feature the original crew in Star Trek: Original Motion Picture Collection. The Voyage Home was remastered in 1080p high definition. Each film in the set has an additional soundtrack, enhanced to 7.1 Dolby TrueHD standard. The disc features a new commentary track by Roberto Orci and Alex Kurtzman, the writers of the 2009 Star Trek film. On July 7, 2021, it was announced that a 4K Ultra HD Blu-ray box set containing the first four Star Trek films would be released on September 7 of that year to commemorate the franchise's 55th anniversary.

== See also ==
- Aluminium oxynitride
- Star Trek film series
- Tomorrow Is Yesterday
- Whales Alive album
