= Shek Kwu Chau =

Island of Hong Kong

石鼓洲
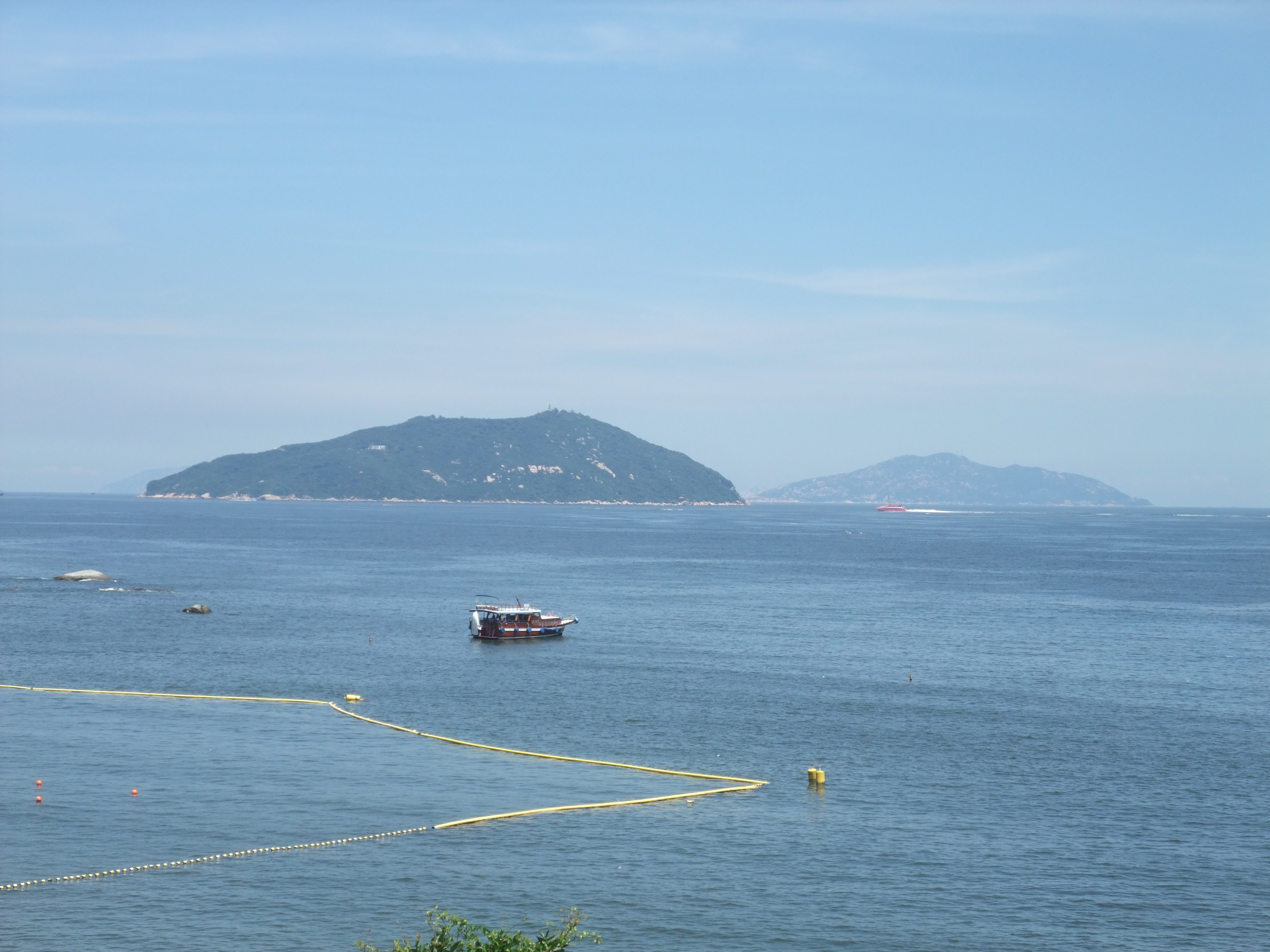
- Shek Kwu Chau (left) and Wai Lingding Island (right), part of the Wanshan Archipelago of Guangdong Province. Picture taken from Cheung Sha, Lantau Island.

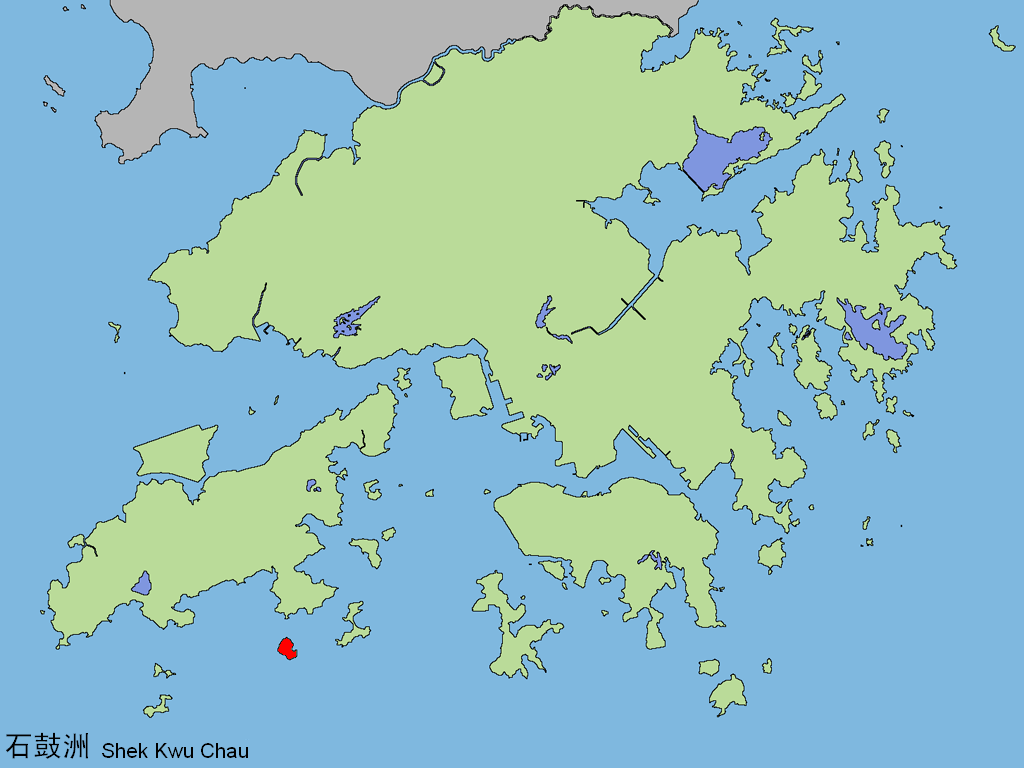
- Location of Shek Kwu Chau within Hong Kong

Geography
- Location: South of Lantau Island
- Coordinates: 22°11′44″N 113°59′16″E
- Area: 1.19 km^{2} (0.46 sq mi)

Administration
- Hong Kong
- District Council: Islands District

Shek Kwu Chau
- Chinese: 石鼓洲
Transcriptions
Standard Mandarin
- Hanyu Pinyin: Shígǔzhōu
Yue: Cantonese
- Yale Romanization: Sehk gú jāu
- Jyutping: Sek^{6} gu^{2} zau^{1}

Shek Kwu Chau is an island of Hong Kong, located south of Lantau Island and between Cheung Chau and the Soko Islands. Administratively, it is part of Islands District.

Shek Kwu Chau is a restricted area and a permit is required to visit the island.

== History ==
An old name for the island was "Coffin Island". It was generally barren and uninhabited until 1962, when it was taken over by the Society for the Aid and Rehabilitation of Drug Abusers.

== Features ==
Shek Kwu Chau Treatment and Rehabilitation Centre is located on Shek Kwu Chau. It is managed by the Society for the Aid and Rehabilitation of Drug Abusers (SARDA).

== Incinerator ==
The Hong Kong government is building an Integrated Waste Management Facilities on a newly created artificial island south of Shek Kwu Chau and west of Cheung Chau, scheduled to be completed in 2018. The government says the incinerator will be able to treat about 3,000 tonnes of waste a day. Secretary for the Environment Edward Yau said the site was chosen over Tsang Tsui in Tuen Mun partly because of the shorter transportation time and the lower impact on the neighbourhood.

On 26 July 2013, the High Court rejected a legal bid to stop construction of the incinerator, brought by Cheung Chau resident Leung Hon-wai.

== Transport ==
Shek Kwu Chau is a 20-minute ferry ride from Cheung Chau.

== See also ==
- Christian Zheng Sheng College
