= Peter Krikes =

American screenwriter

- Born: United States
- Occupation: Screenwriter
- Years active: 1986-1999

Peter Krikes is an American screenwriter who contributed to the screenplay for Star Trek IV: The Voyage Home (1986).

== Filmography ==
- Star Trek IV: The Voyage Home (1986)
- Back to the Beach (1987)
- Double Impact (1991)
- Anna and the King (1999)
