= Chi Ma Wan =

Bay on Lantau Island, New Territories, Hong Kong

Coordinates: 22°14′N 114°00′E

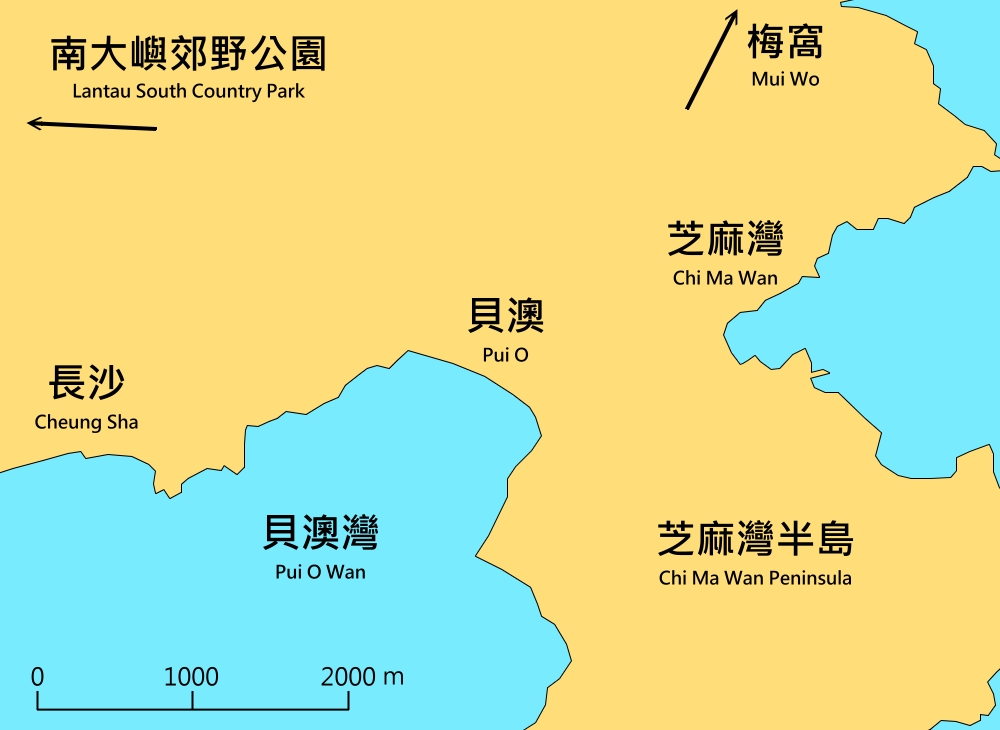
Map showing the location of Chi Ma Wan and Chi Ma Wan Peninsula.

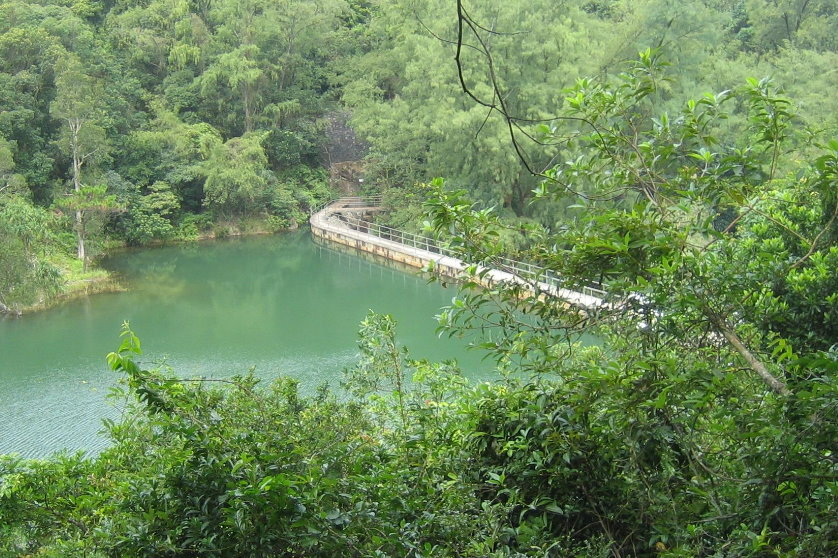
Shap Long Reservoir (十塱水塘), an irrigation reservoir on Chi Ma Wan Peninsula.

Chi Ma Wan (Chinese: 芝麻灣; Jyutping: zi1 maa4 waan1; lit. 'Sesame Bay') is a bay on southeastern Lantau Island, New Territories, Hong Kong. Chi Ma Wan Peninsula (芝麻灣半島; zi1 maa4 waan1 bun3 dou2) is where Chi Ma Wan, as well as Cheung Sha Wan, Tai Long Wan, Yi Long Wan and Mong Tung Wan are located. The Peninsula is located within the boundaries of Lantau South Country Park.

== Correctional institutions ==
The Chi Ma Wan Correctional Institution is near Cheung Sha Wan on the peninsula. It was originally picked out by the Hong Kong Colonial Government as a site to house Russian refugees but in the end they decided not to build it and focussed on a prison instead. Established in 1956, it was the first open prison in Hong Kong. It is not currently in use.

The Christian Zheng Sheng College, a school providing correctional services for students, is also located on the peninsula. It is a private institution not affiliated with the Hong Kong Correctional Services Department (HK CSD).

== The Sea Ranch ==
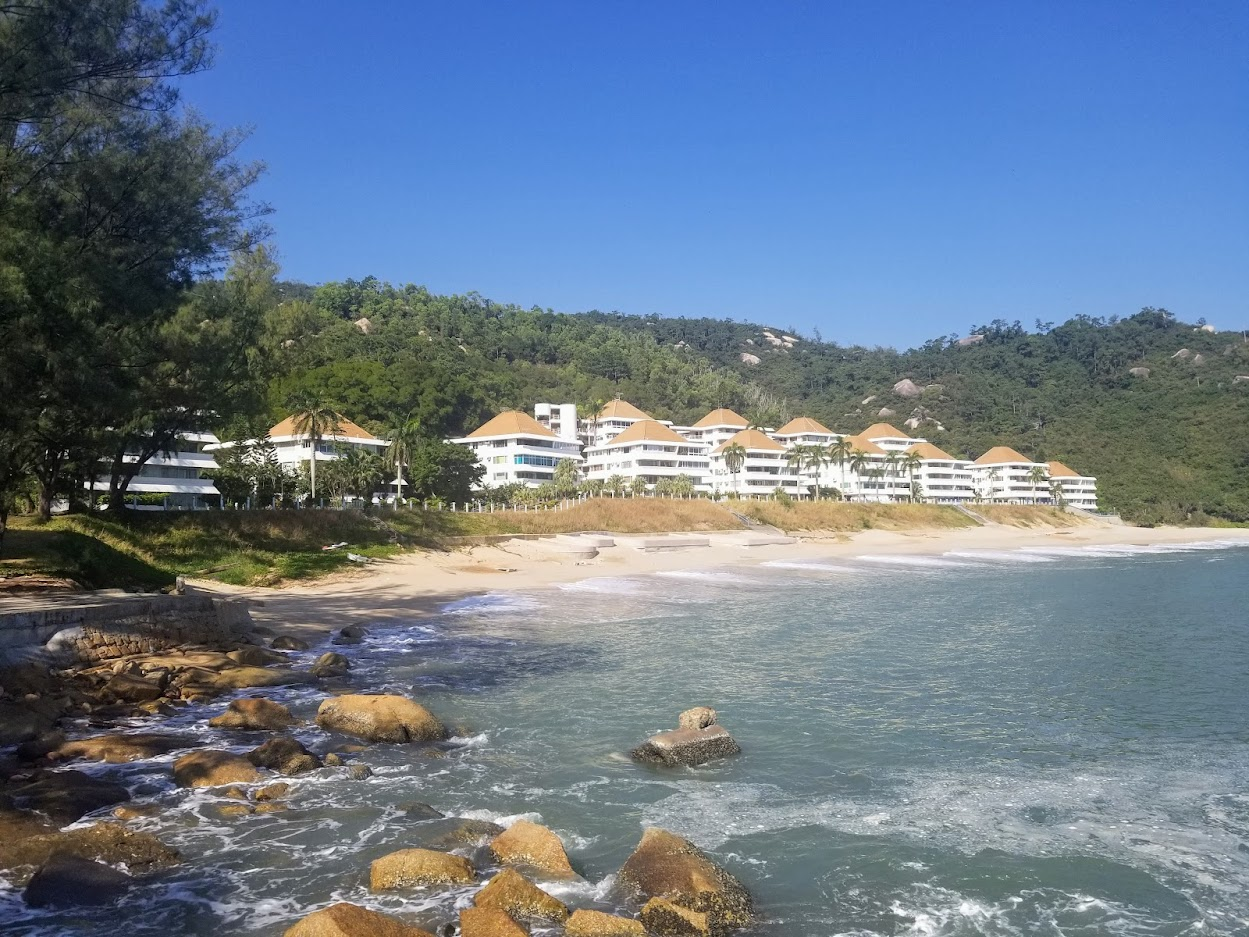
View of Sea Ranch.

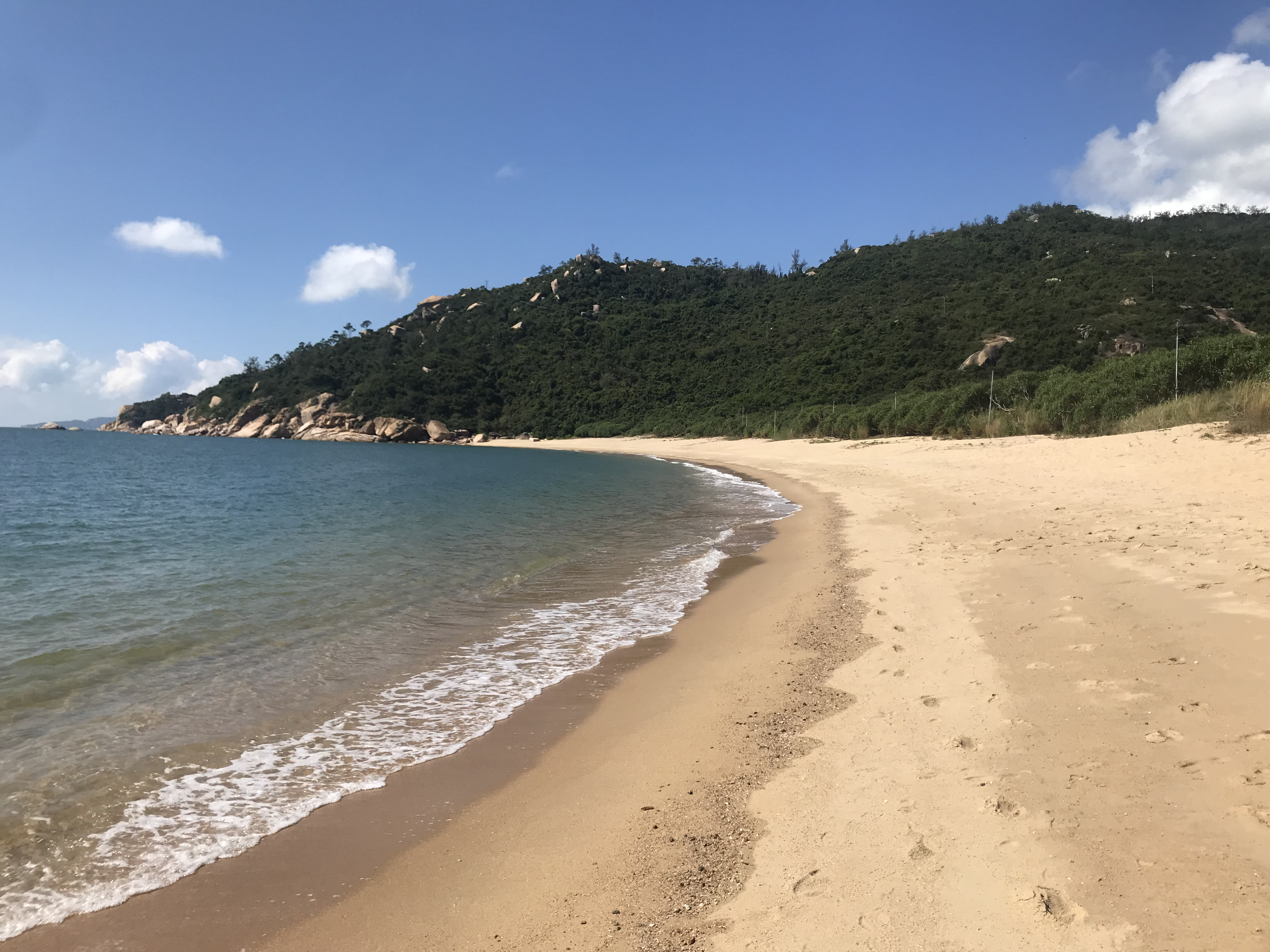
Tai Long Wan beach, Chi Ma Wan.

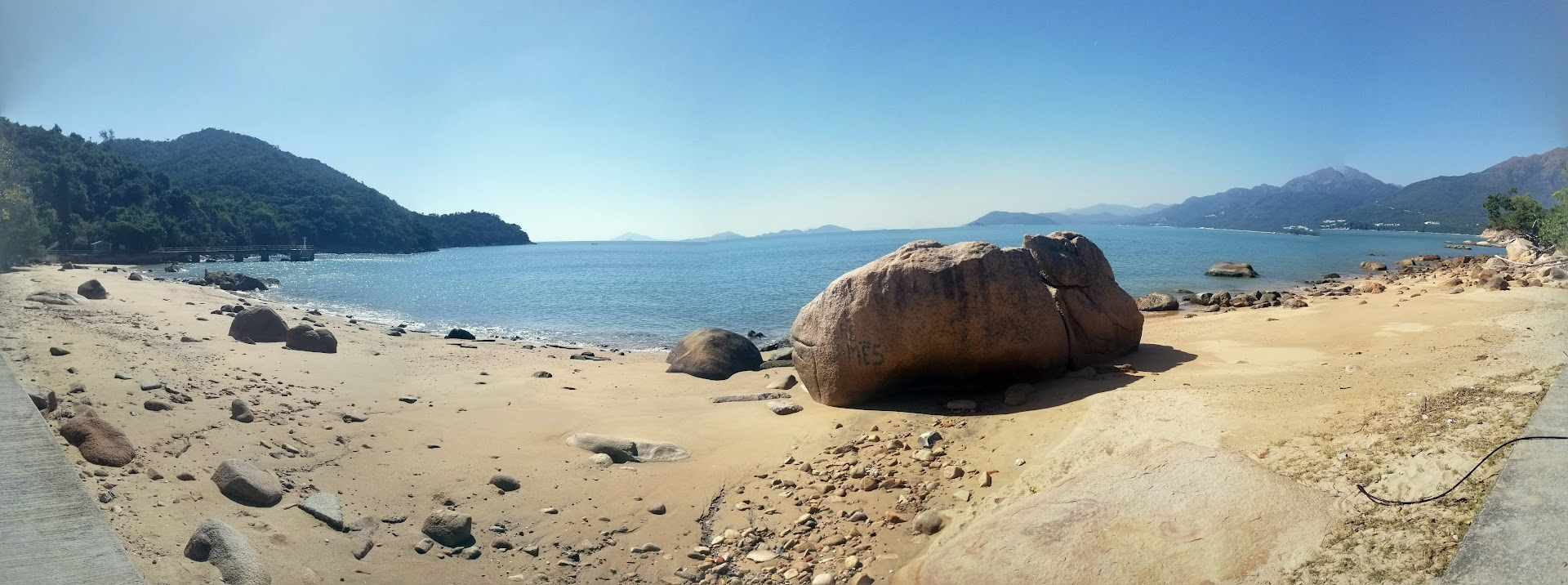
Mong Tung Wan.

The Sea Ranch (澄碧邨) is a housing estate developed by Hutchison Whampoa Properties in the late 1970s at Yi Long Wan (二浪灣) on Chi Ma Wan Peninsula.

The Sea Ranch is only reachable from the sea as it is located on the coastline of the Lantau South Country Park and has no road access. To reach the city centre, residents and their guests must take a private ferry from the Sea Ranch to Cheung Chau which takes about 20 minutes, and then ferries from Cheung Chau to Central Ferry Piers no. 5 in Central. There are no shops or restaurants within the estate and for this reason it is unique in Hong Kong. The original clubhouse and sporting facilities have been closed for a number of years and the estate is now a tranquil and peaceful enclave on the South Lantau coast.

== See also ==
- Shap Long Reservoir
- Vietnamese refugee detention centres in Hong Kong
- Villages: Mong Tung Wan, Pui O, Tai Long and Shap Long
