= Big Wave Bay =

Big Wave Bay or Tai Long Wan (Chinese: 大浪灣) is the name of several bays in Hong Kong:

- Big Wave Bay, Hong Kong Island
- Big Wave Bay Beach, Hong Kong
- Tai Long Wan, Chi Ma Wan
- Tai Long Wan, Sai Kung
- Tai Long Wan, Shek Pik
