= Tai Long Wan, Chi Ma Wan =

Bay in Hong Kong

Coordinates: 22.216941°N 113.997703°E

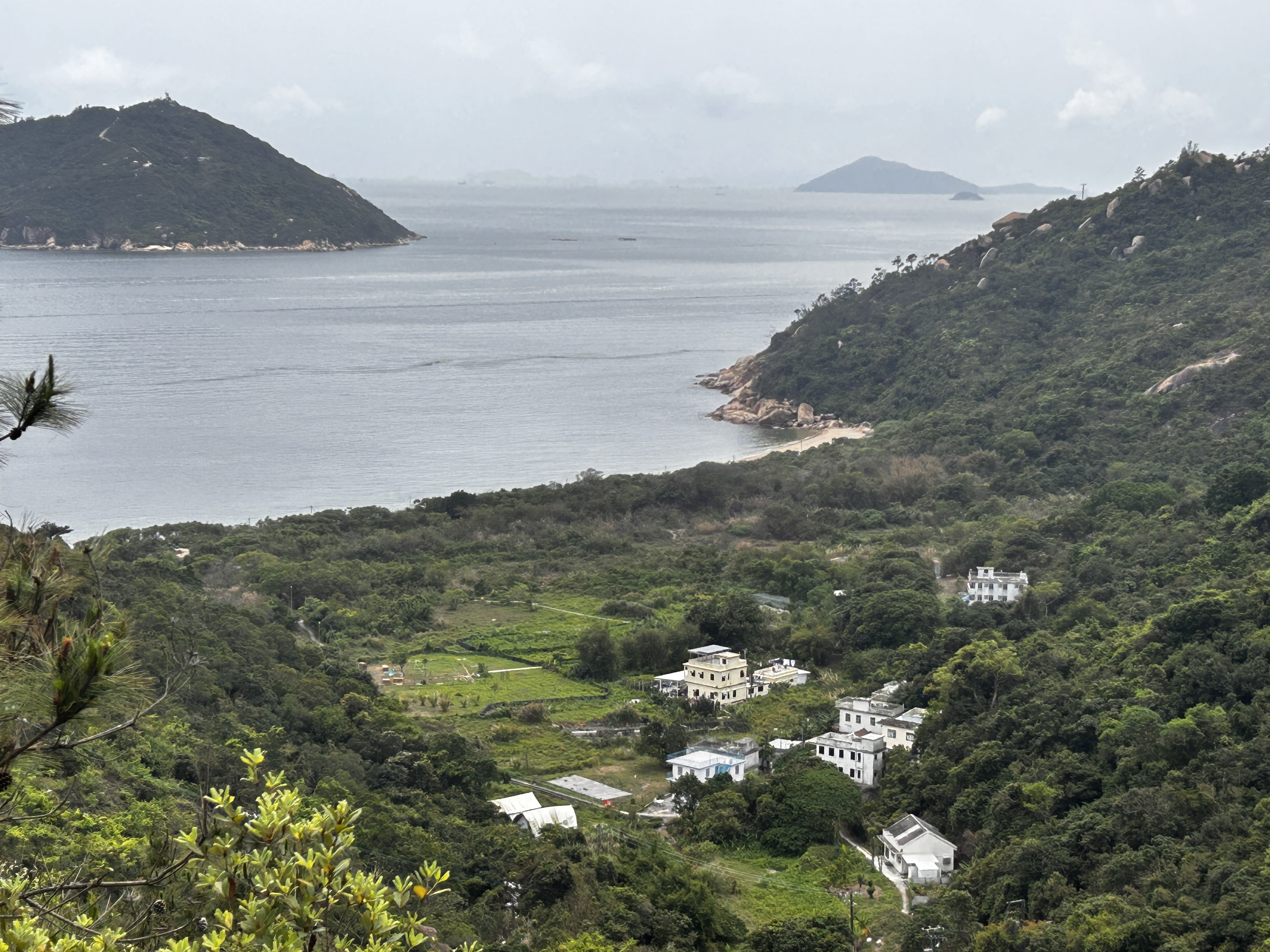
Tai Laong village and bay

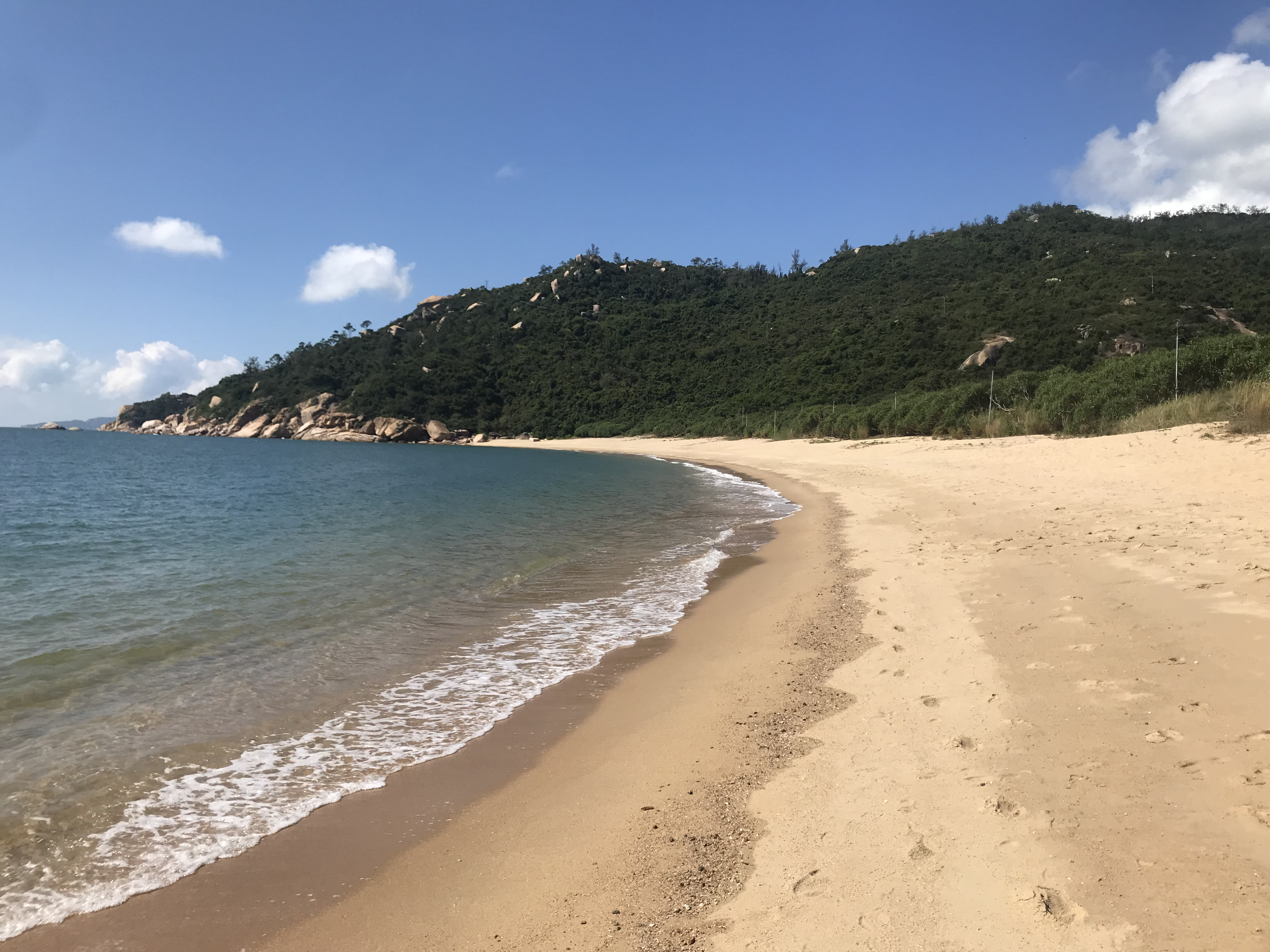
Tai Long Wan beach, Chi Ma Wan

Tai Long Wan (Chinese: 大浪灣; lit. 'Big Wave Bay') is a bay at the south of the Chi Ma Wan Peninsula on Lantau Island, Hong Kong. It is the next bay east of Yi Long Wan (二浪灣), where the Sea Ranch is located.

== Village ==
The village of Tai Long (大浪) is located north of the bay. It is a recognized village under the New Territories Small House Policy. The village only has a small population of elderly residents and some organic farms.

The lack of light pollution makes it a great spot for stargazing and firefly spotting, and after sightings in Hong Kong of the rare firefly Rhagophthalmus the Hong Kong Firefly Museum was opened there in 2010.
