= List of schools in Islands District =

This is a list of schools in Islands District, Hong Kong.

== Secondary schools ==
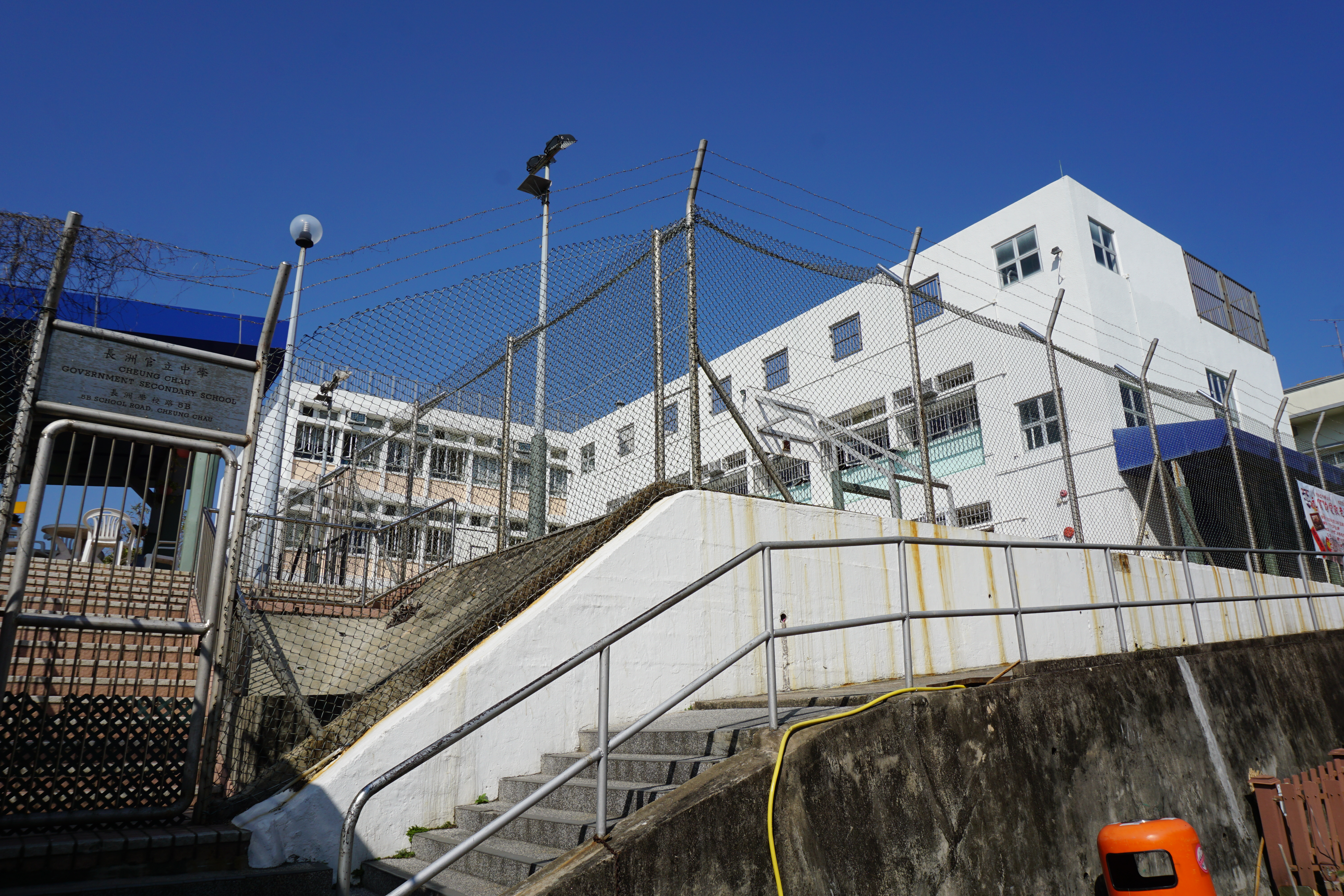
Cheung Chau Government Secondary School

Government

- Cheung Chau Government Secondary School (長洲官立中學)

Aided

- Buddhist Wai Yan Memorial College (佛教慧因法師紀念中學)
- Caritas Chan Chun Ha Field Studies Center (明愛陳震夏郊野學園)
- HKFEW Wong Cho Bau Secondary School
- Ho Yu College and Primary School (sponsored by Sik Sik Yuen) (嗇色園主辦可譽中學暨可譽小學)
- Ling Liang Church E Wun Secondary School
- Po Leung Kuk Mrs. Ma Kam Ming-Cheung Fook Sien College
- Tung Chung Catholic School

Direct Subsidy Scheme

- Buddhist Fat Ho Memorial College
- Caritas Charles Vath College
- YMCA of Hong Kong Christian College

Private

- Christian Zheng Sheng College
- Discovery Bay International School
- Discovery College

== Primary schools ==
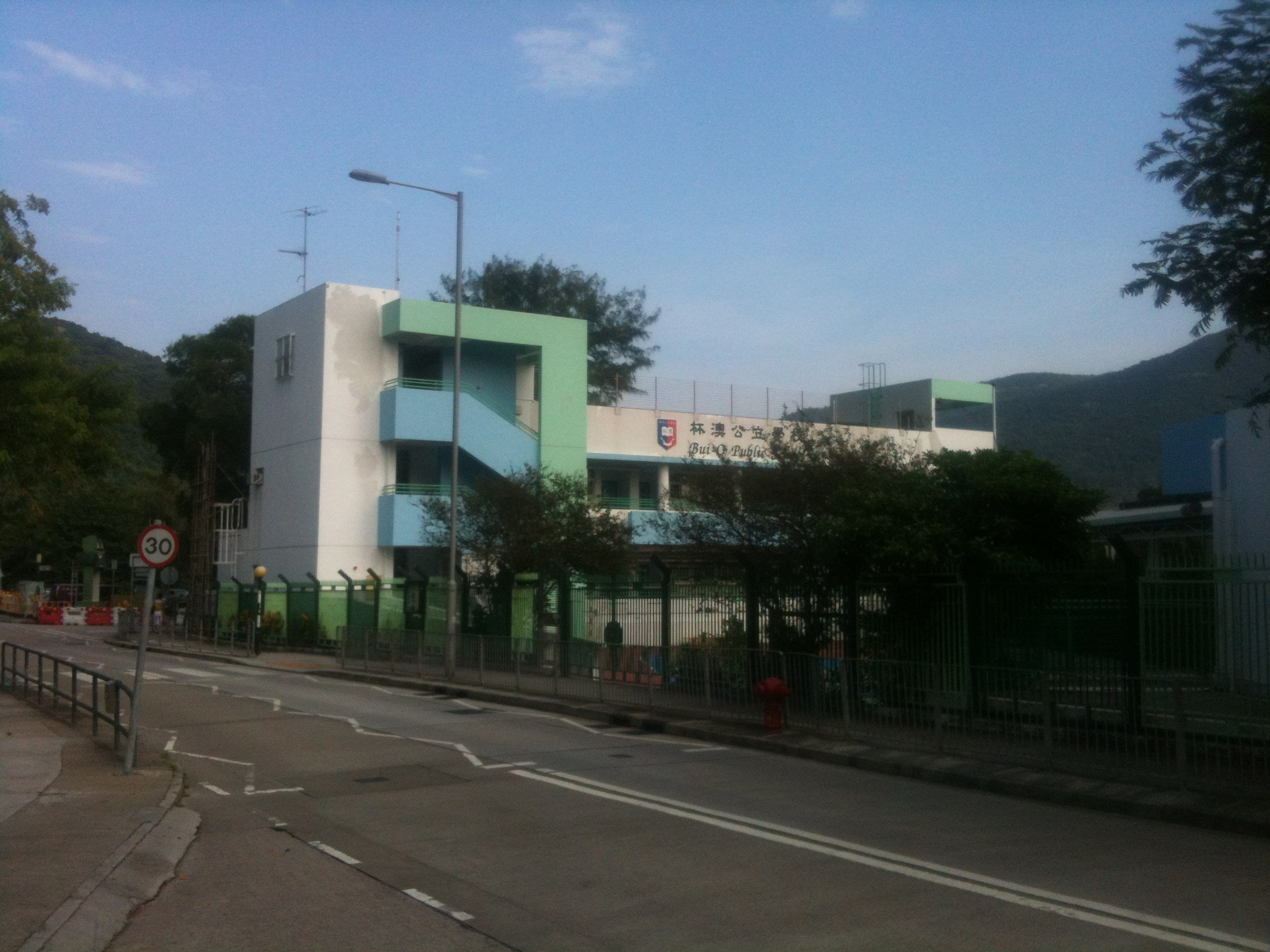
Bui O Public School

Aided

- Bui O Public School (杯澳公立學校)
- CCC Cheung Chau Church Kam Kong Primary School (中華基督教會長洲堂錦江小學)
- CCC Tai O Primary School (中華基督教會大澳小學)
- Cheng Chau Sacred Heart School (長洲聖心學校)
- Ching Chung Hau Po Woon Primary School (青松侯寶垣小學)
- HKFEW Wong Cho Bau School (香港教育工作者聯會黃楚標學校)
- Ho Yu College and Primary School (sponsored by Sik Sik Yuen) (嗇色園主辦可譽中學暨可譽小學)
- Holy Family School (聖家學校)
- Kwok Man School (國民學校)
- Ling Liang Church Sau Tak Primary School (靈糧堂秀德小學)
- Mui Wo School (梅窩學校)
- Northern Lamma School (南丫北段公立小學)
- Po On Commercial Association Wan Ho Kan Primary School (寶安商會溫浩根小學)
- Salvation Army Lam Butt Chung Memorial School (救世軍林拔中紀念學校)
- SKH Wei Lun Primary School (聖公會偉倫小學)
- Tung Chung Catholic School

Private

- Discovery Bay International School
- Discovery College
- Discovery Mind Primary School (弘志學校)
- Discovery Montessori Academy
- Lantau International School
- Silvermine Bay School (銀礦灣學校)

== Special schools ==
Aided

- Hong Chi Shiu Pong Morninghope School (匡智紹邦晨輝學校)

== Former schools ==
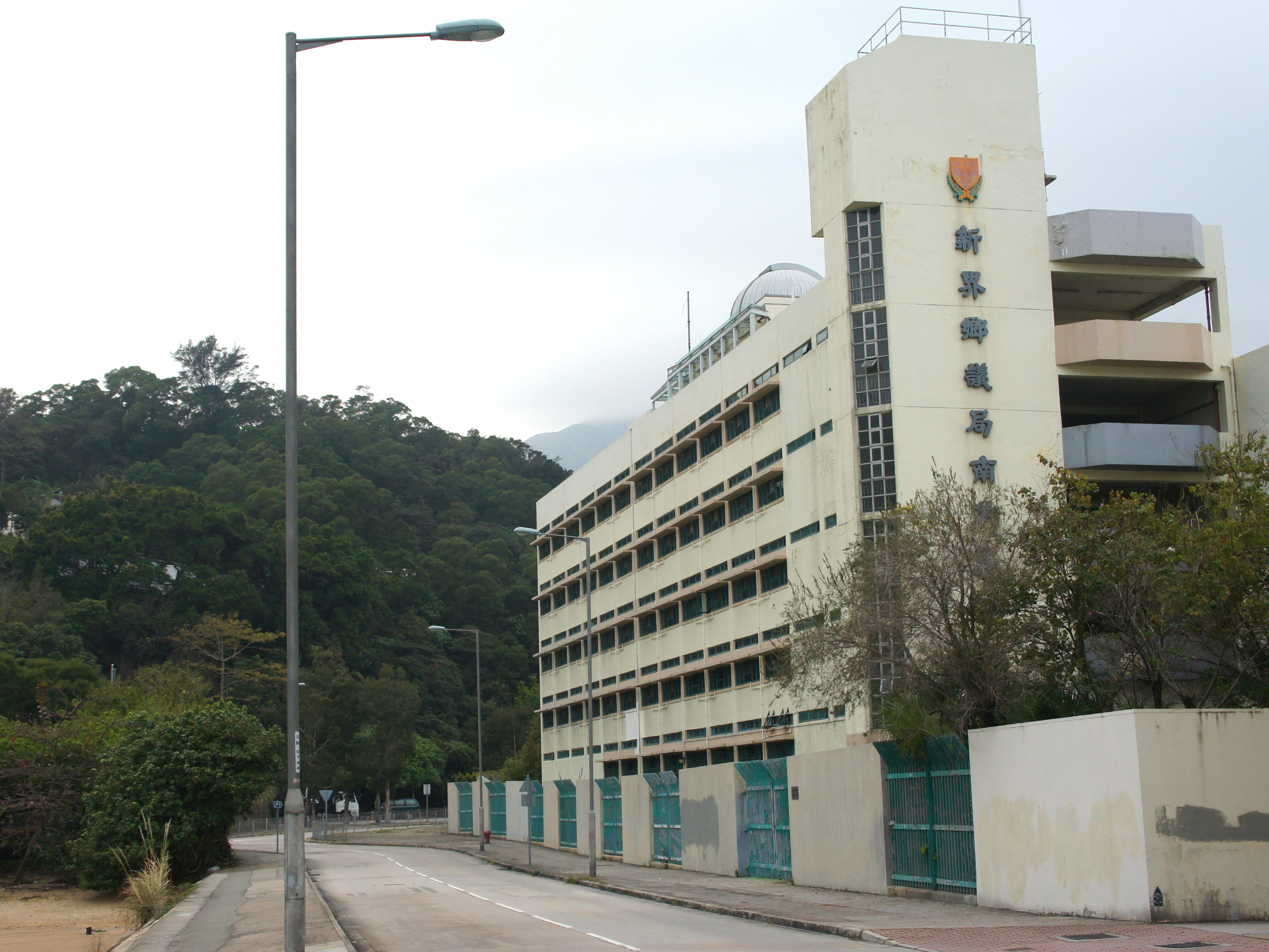
NTHYK Southern District Secondary School (新界鄉議局南約區中學)

Government

- NTHYK Southern District Secondary School (新界鄉議局南約區中學) - Mui Wo

Aided

- Cheung Chau Fisheries Joint Association Public School (長洲漁會公學)
