= Taipo =

Taipo may refer to:

- Maria Helena Taipo (b. 1961), Mozambican politician
- Taipo River (disambiguation), different rivers in New Zealand
- Tai Po, an area in Hong Kong

== See also ==
- Tai Po (disambiguation)
