= Tung Chung River =

River on Lantau Island, Hong Kong

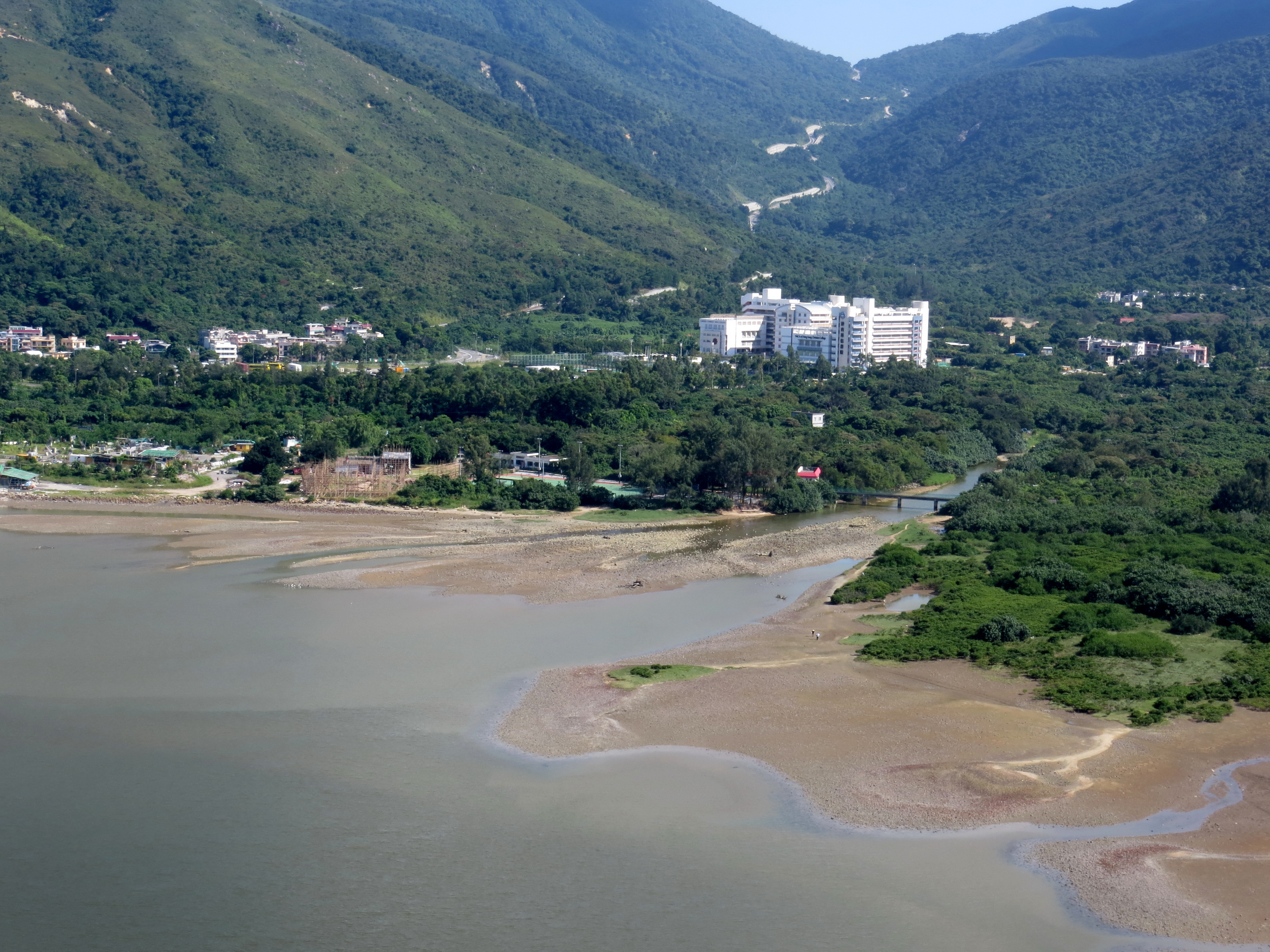
- Tung Chung River

Physical characteristics
- Mouth
  - coordinates: 22°16′48″N 113°55′46″E
- Length: 4.31 km (2.68 mi)

Tung Chung River
- Traditional Chinese: 東涌河
Transcriptions

The Tung Chung River is a river on Lantau Island, Hong Kong. It is designated by the governmental Agriculture, Fisheries and Conservation Department as one of the "Ecologically Important Streams" within the territory. It is 4.31 km in length.

== Ecology ==
According to the University of Hong Kong, the Tung Chung River is home to more than 20 species of fish, including the Beijiang Thick-lipped Bard (Acrossocheilus beijiangensis), a species of conservation concern internationally.

Rare tree species including those in the genera of Exbucklandia, Magnolia and Illicium are also present in the river area. A part of the river catchment at the upper course has been designated as a Site of Special Scientific Interest (SSSI).

== History ==
=== Illegal Excavation for Hong Kong Disneyland project ===
In 2003, a 330-metre section of this Ecologically Important Stream near Shek Mun Kap was found damaged by unauthorised excavations. It was later revealed that the boulders illegally excavated from this river were used by a subcontractor to build Hong Kong Disneyland. About 400 tonnes of the boulders were brought to Penny's Bay to create an artificial lake as part of the development of the adjacent Hong Kong Disneyland Resort. The government jailed the chairman of village interest group Tung Chung Rural Committee along with several others for this illegal activity.

== Current situation ==
The government has touted this river as a potential eco-tourism area, but in a recent survey in 2021, over 90 per cent of respondents thought that the government should "conserve the river and its estuary by restoring damaged areas, setting up conservation areas and restricting the number of tourists", according to a local media outlet.

== See also ==
- Conservation in Hong Kong
- Tung Chung
- Tung Chung Bay
