= Tai Po (disambiguation) =

- Traditional Chinese: 大埔
Transcriptions

Alternative Chinese name
- Traditional Chinese: 大步
Transcriptions

Tai Po is a populated place in Hong Kong.

== Places ==
Tai Po may also refer to these places:

- Tai Po New Town, a new town (satellite town) and modern day built-up area, urban planning subdivision of Hong Kong, that name after Tai Po Market. It was located in the Tai Po District. The new town included Tai Po Market, Tai Po Old Market, Tai Po Kau and other land that obtained from land reclamation. The new town sometimes known as just Tai Po
- Tai Po District, an administrative district of Hong Kong, established in the British colonial era of Hong Kong, cover Tai Po and northern part of Sai Kung Peninsula, sometimes known as just Tai Po
- Tai Po Tau, a village of Tang clan in the Tai Po New Town and Tai Po District, which the history dated back to at least Ming dynasty of China. One of the oldest populated places that named after Tai Po
- Tai Po Old Market (Tai Po Kau Hui), a residential area in the Tai Po New Town and Tai Po District, a defunct market town that was founded by Tai Po Tau village, former known as Tai Po Hui and Tai Po Tau Hui
- Tai Po Market (Tai Po Hui), one of the current market centre of Tai Po New Town and Tai Po District, founded as a market town known as Tai Wo Shi in Qing dynasty of China
- Tai Po Centre, a private residential estate in the Tai Po New Town, named after Tai Po the market town/new town/the district. One of the market centre of the new town and the district
- Tai Po Kau, a village and wild land of the Tai Po New Town and the Tai Po District
- Tai Po Hoi (Tai Po Sea), a water body that divided the Tai Po proper and the exclave Sai Kung North, as well as Sha Tin District
- Tai Po Tin Tsuen, a village in the North District of Hong Kong
- Tai Po Tsai Tsuen, a village in the Sai Kung Peninsula
- Tai Po River, a river in Hong Kong

=== Places in Hong Kong with the same romanization ===
- Tai Po (Tung Chung) (低埔), a village in Tung Chung, Islands District

== In sport ==
- Tai Po FC, a professional football club, also known as just Tai Po

== In transport ==
- Tai Po Market station, a mass transit railway station
  - Old Tai Po Market railway station, see Hong Kong Railway Museum
- Tai Po Road

== See also ==
- Taipo River (disambiguation)
- Dabu County of Mainland China. Shared the same Chinese character with the Hong Kong area
- Dapu, Chiayi of Taiwan. Shared the same Chinese character with the Hong Kong area
- Tai (disambiguation)
- Po (disambiguation)
