= Tung Chung =

Tung Chung 東涌
- New town
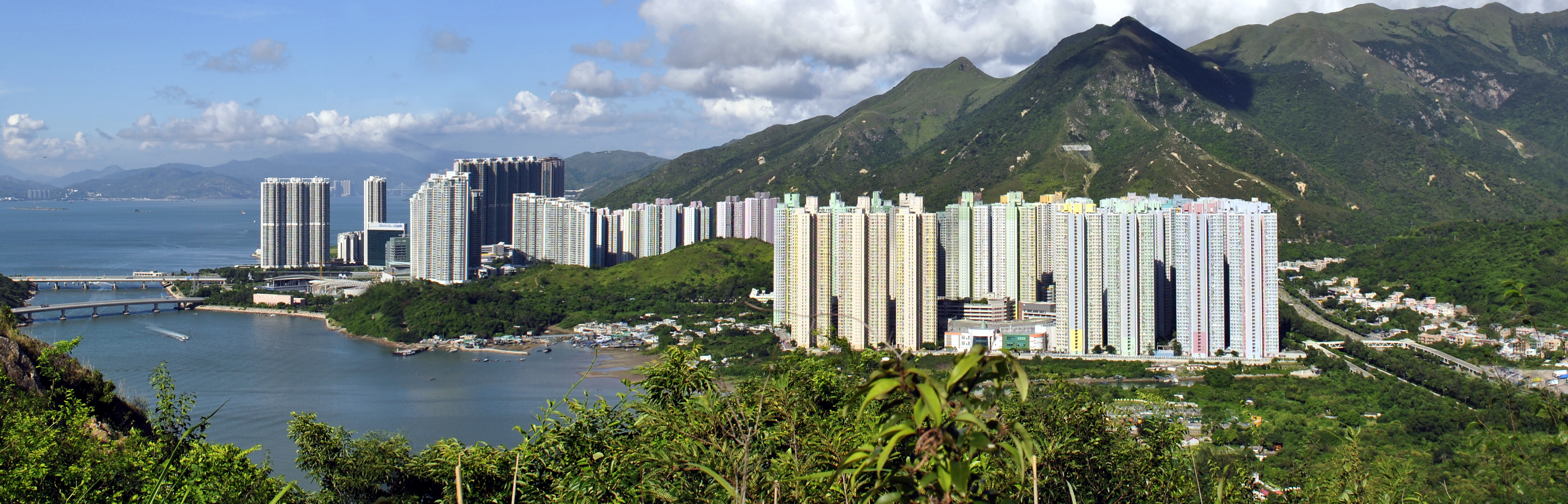
- Panoramic view of Tung Chung

- Location within Hong Kong
- Coordinates: 22°17′13″N 113°56′37″E
- Country: Hong Kong
- Established: 1994 (Phase 1)
- Elevation: 45 m (148 ft)

Population
  - Total: 116,022 83.2% Chinese 6.7% South Asian 3.8% Filipino

Tung Chung
- Traditional Chinese: 東涌
- Simplified Chinese: 东涌
Transcriptions
Standard Mandarin
- Hanyu Pinyin: Dōngchōng
Yue: Cantonese
- Yale Romanization: Dūngchūng
- Jyutping: Dung1cung1
- IPA: [tʊ́ŋ tsʰʊ́ŋ]

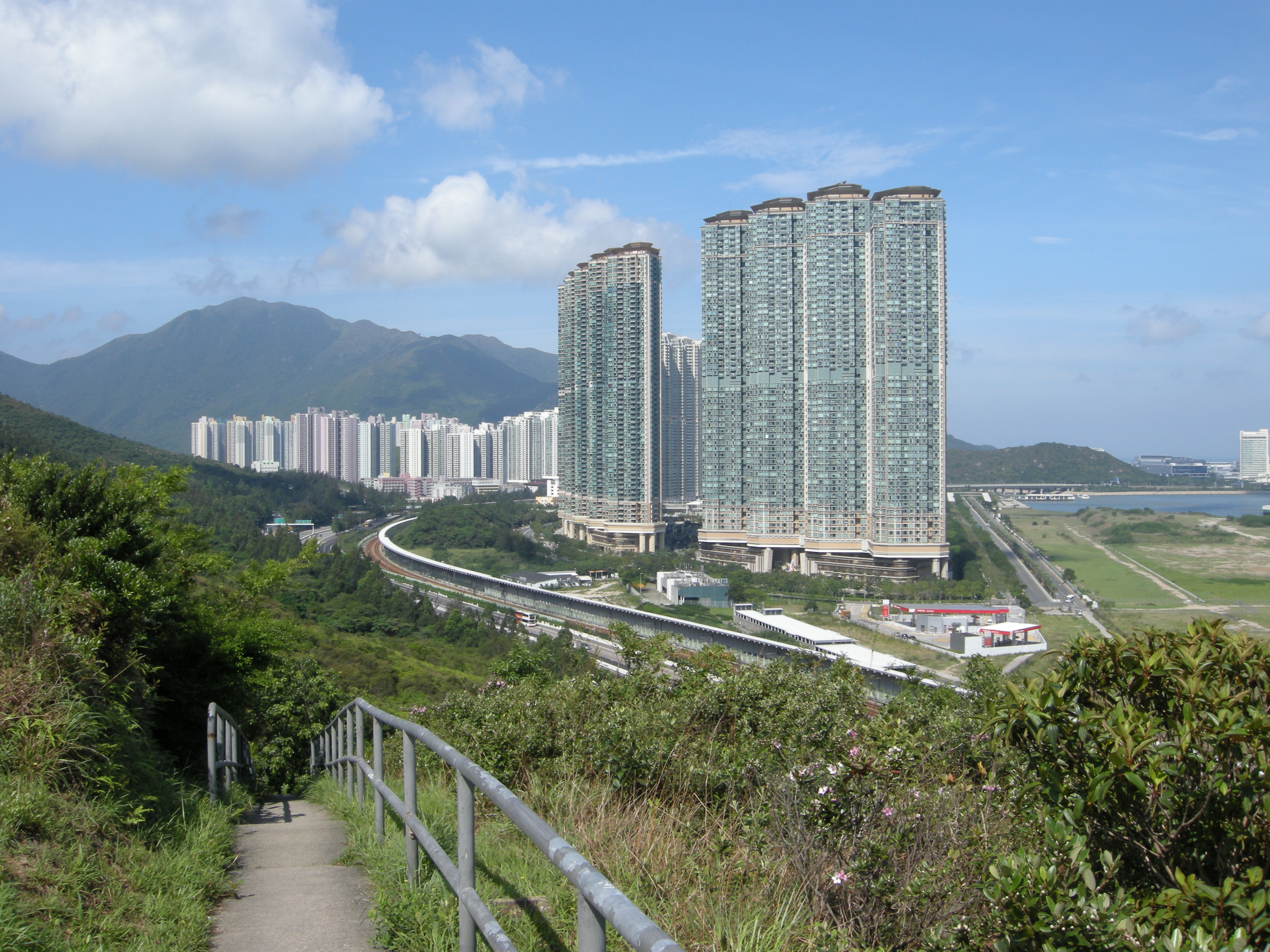
View of Tung Chung from hiking trail, beside North Lantau Highway

Tung Chung (Chinese: 東涌; pinyin: Dōngchōng; lit. 'eastern stream') is an area on the northwestern coast of Lantau Island, Hong Kong. One of the most recent new towns, it was formerly a rural fishing village beside Tung Chung Bay, and along the delta and lower courses of Tung Chung River and Ma Wan Chung in the north-western coast of Lantau Island. The area was once an important defence stronghold against pirates and foreign military during the Ming and the Qing dynasties.

Developed as part of the Airport Core Programme, the North Lantau New Town is the first new town on an outlying island of Hong Kong, with the first phases built on reclaimed land to the north, east and northeast of the original Tung Chung Town. Administratively, Tung Chung is part of Islands District.

== History ==
=== Early times ===
Since the Song dynasty between 960 and 1279 AD, there have been people living in Tung Chung. At that time, they lived on fishing and agriculture. Crabs, fishes and crops were their main productions.

This place was originally called Tung Sai Chung, when Hong Kong was still a group of fishing villages. Tung means east in Cantonese, while Sai means west. At that time, merchandising ships sailed east to the village and west to Macau.

Tung Sai Chung is one of five villages of Lantau that were resettled when the coastal restriction of the Great Clearance was lifted in 1669. The other villages are Tai O, Lo Pui O, Shek Pik and Mui Wo.

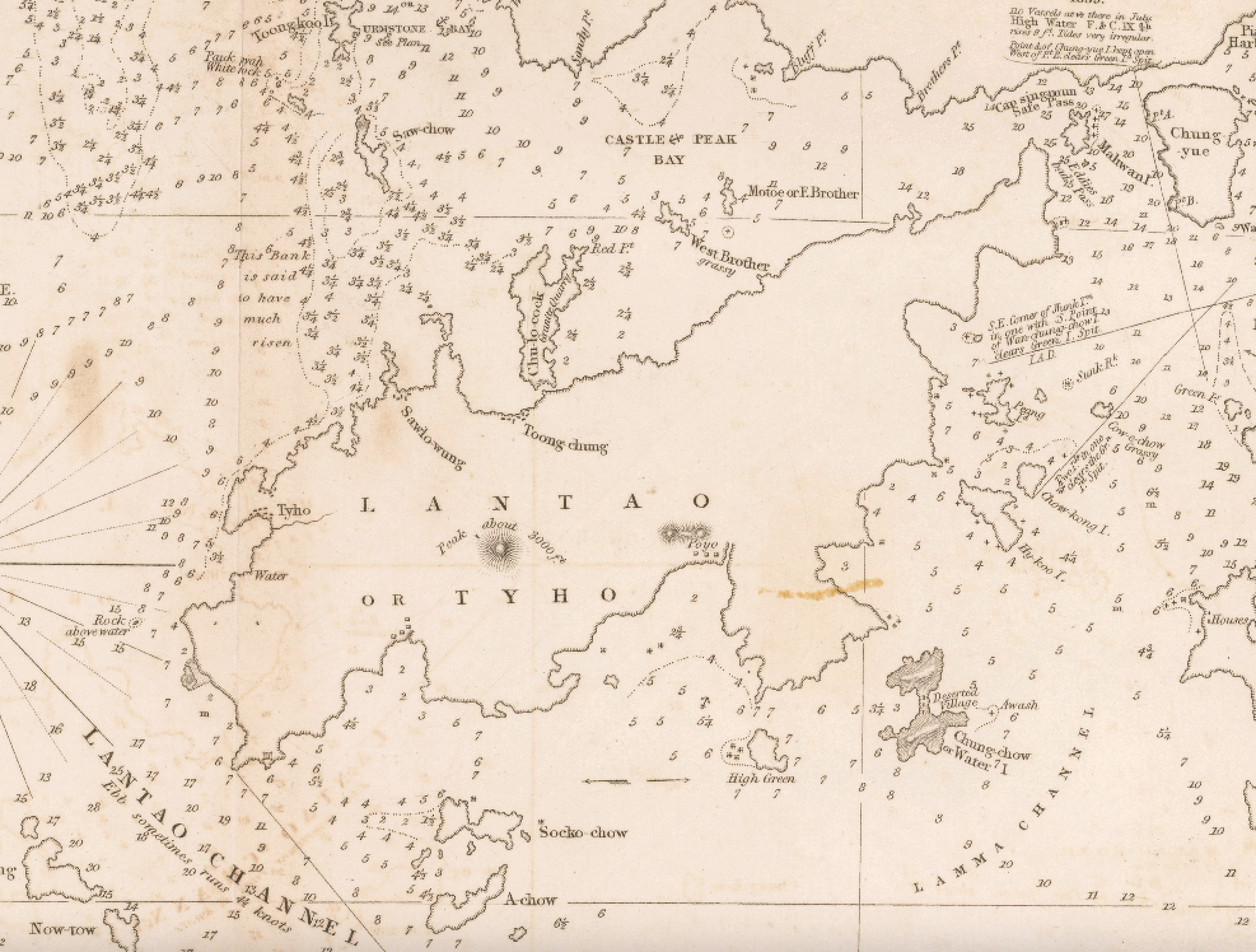
Lantau Island as surveyed by a British fleet in 1815. Tung Chung can be seen in the center.

Tung Chung was already seen on Western maps beginning in 1815, sometimes with the romanization Toong-chung (see image).

Tung Chung may be a new town, but its heritage can be seen in the form of old fishing villages. They show another façade of Tung Chung, of a village before the development of the airport and the town.

=== New town development ===
In the 1990s, Tung Chung was developed as a new town. This was undertaken as part of the Airport Core Programme, a package of development and infrastructure projects surrounding the relocation of Hong Kong's international airport from Kai Tak to Chek Lap Kok, adjacent to Tung Chung. Tung Chung New Town was intended to serve as a supporting community for the new airport.

According to the information from the Hong Kong Territory Development Department, Tung Chung is being developed in four phases into a new town with a target population of 250,000 people. The first phase was completed in 1994; infrastructure works was completed in January 1997 in order to tie with the subsequent completion of the first housing developments. This phase of development provided about 20,000 people in the district to support the airport at Chek Lap Kok.

Phase 2 of Tung Chung development was also completed. About 350,000 square metres of land was reclaimed east of the Phase 1 development area. Roads and drainage works to serve this reclaimed land were completed in May 2000. Land formation of 270,000 m^{2} for the remaining Phase 2 areas south of Tung Chung Bay together with the associated infrastructure were completed in February 2001. Upon completion, Phase 2 development will accommodate a population of 67,000.

Reclamation works under Phase 3A development commenced in March 1999 and were completed in April 2003. About 260,000 m^{2} of land was reclaimed north-east of Phase I development area. The reclamation will provide land for housing developments to accommodate a population of about 22,000.

The remaining development in Tung Chung is planned to be implemented as Phases 3 and 4 and to be completed in a foreseeable future.

Currently, Tung Chung is primarily residential, but an office block and hotel have already been completed. It is envisaged that in the future, other commercial projects will be developed in Tung Chung to support the growing population.

== Housing ==
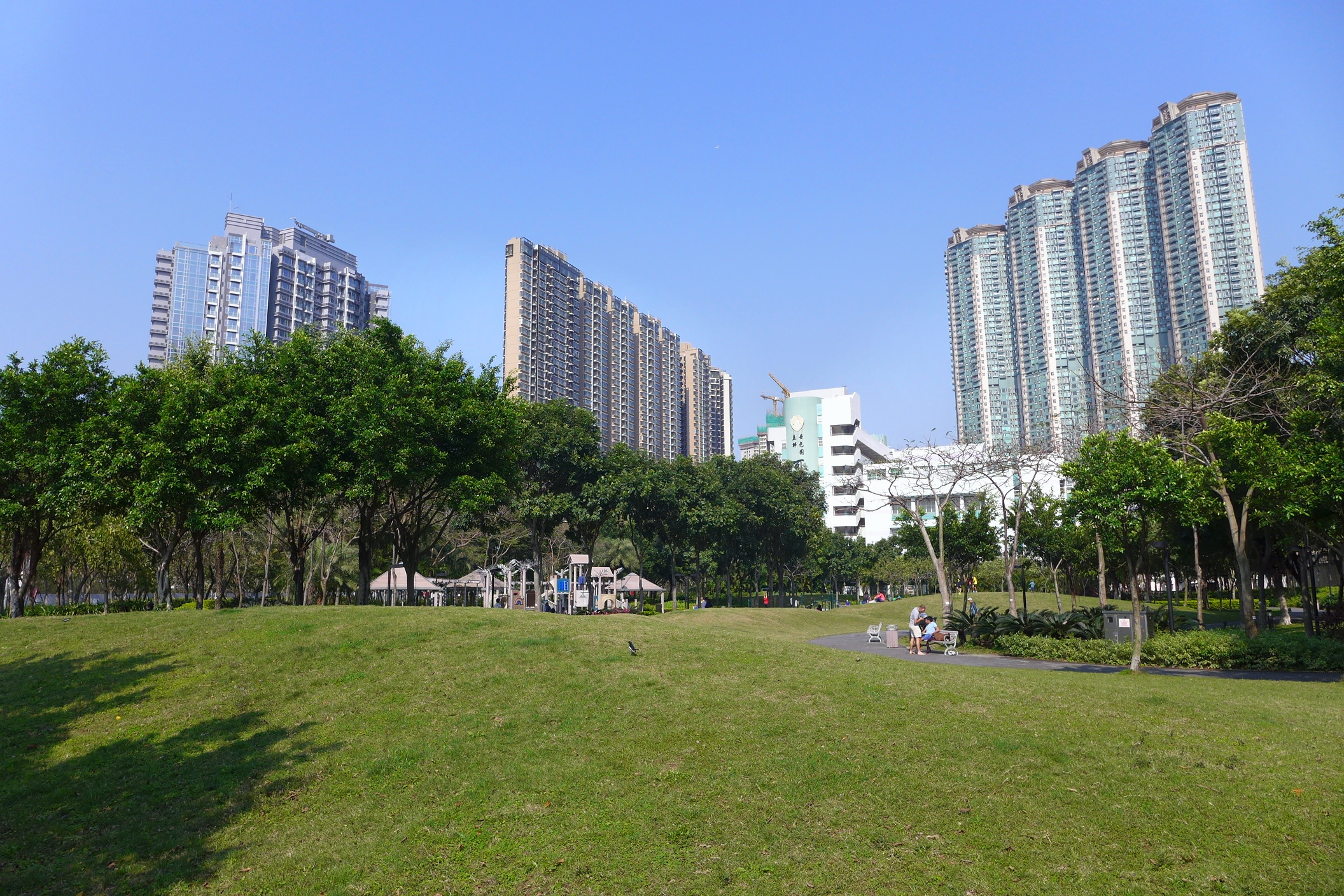
Private housing estates in Tung Chung New Town

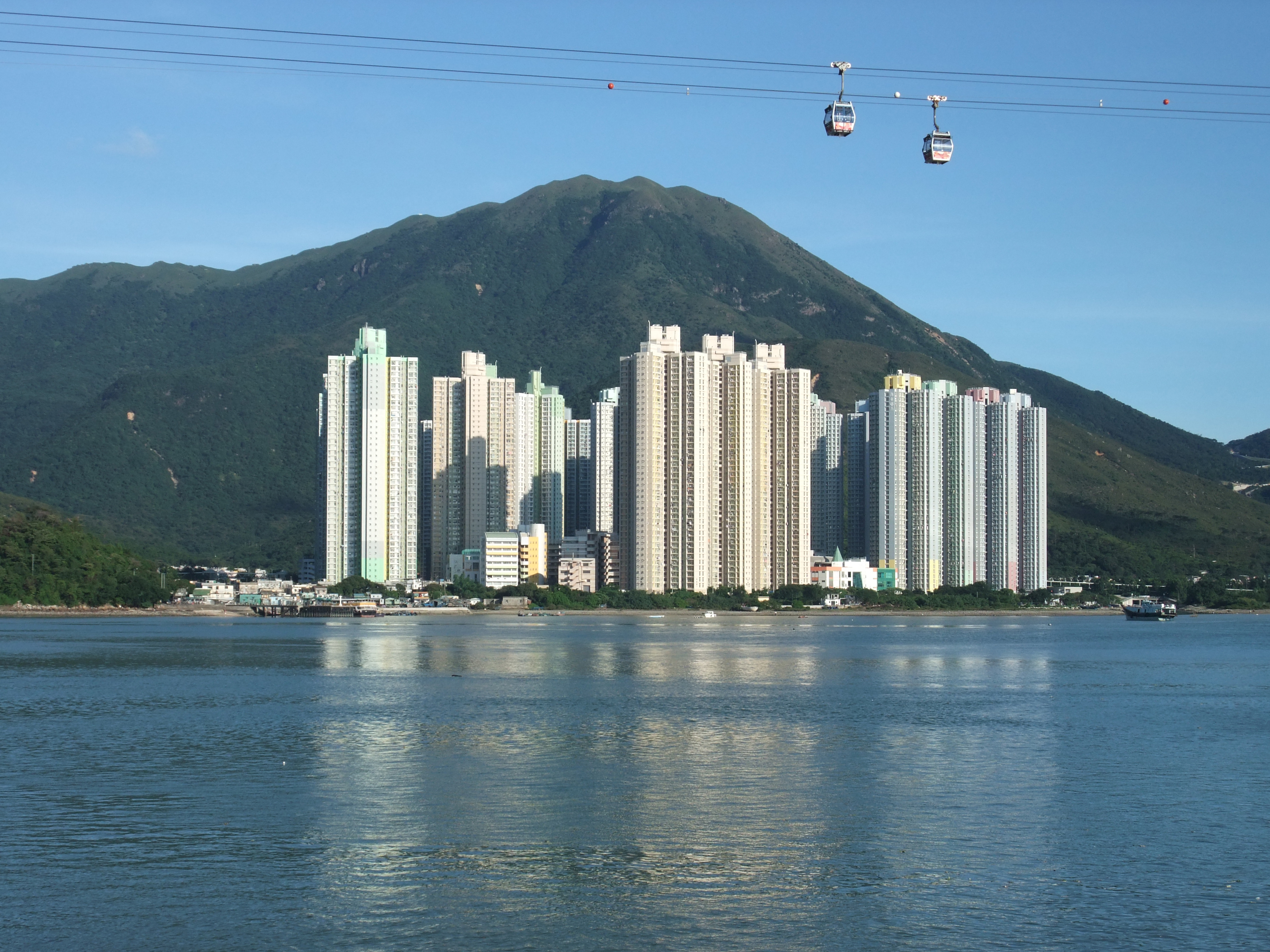
Yat Tung Estate viewed across Tung Chung Bay, with Sunset Peak in the background

Tung Chung New Town (Phase 1) is the newly developed core living area around Tung Chung. The development is one of the ten parts of the Hong Kong Airport Core Programme. The first phase of public housing development was completed in late 1997 and can accommodate up to 15,000 people. Another 5,000 people are housed in the private housing development completed in 1998.

=== Private housing estates ===
Tung Chung Crescent is the MTR Tung Chung Station Development Package One together with Seaview Crescent and Citygate. It is the first private residential estate completed in Tung Chung. It is jointly developed by five local developers including Hang Lung Development Co. Ltd., Henderson Land Development Co. Ltd., New World Development Co. Ltd., Sun Hung Kai Properties Ltd., Swire Properties and with the MTR Corporation.

Seaview Crescent, developed by the same developers as Tung Chung Crescent, consists of four tower blocks in the same style of Tung Chung Crescent, though these face the sea and the airport at Chek Lap Kok.

Coastal Skyline is the MTR Tung Chung Station Development Package Two. It was jointly developed by HKR International Limited, Hong Leong Holdings Limited and Reco Tung Chung Pte Ltd. and MTR Corporation and consisting of seven residential towers of around 50 stories each, and a number of low-rise flats.

Caribbean Coast is the MTR Tung Chung Station Development Package Three. It was jointly developed by Cheung Kong (Holdings) Limited, Hutchison Whampoa Limited and the MTR Corporation. It is about 67,900 m^{2} with both residential and commercial buildings.

The Visionary was built by Nan Fung Group, consisting of 9 buildings with 34/35 floors each, 3 duplexes, and 6 houses. It is the first estate to be built on the reclamation land of Tung Chung North-east.

Century Link developed by the Sun Hung Kai Group, consisting of 2 phases and 6 towers (27 to 29 storeys) with 3 residential blocks (2 storeys). It is the second estate to be built on the reclamation land of Tung Chung North-east after the Visionary.

=== Public housing estates ===
Public (government) housing and Home Ownership Scheme flats also make up a sizeable part of Tung Chung. The first phase of public housing development including five homeownership blocks at Yu Tung Court and three public rental housing blocks at Fu Tung Estate comprising 2,640 homeownership and 1,664 rental units.

Yat Tung Estate is a newer integrated development consisting of twenty 40-story tower blocks towards the south of the town center, near the fishing village in Tung Chung Bay, complete with kindergartens, primary and secondary schools, shopping mall, car park, and transport interchange.

Ying Tung Estate was built in 2018 near Ying Tung Road, which consists of four blocks: Ying Chui House, Ying Yuet House, Ying Hei House and Ying Fuk House.

In 2025, two new public housing estates, Cheung Tung Estate and Chun Tung Estate, were added to Tung Chung’s public housing portfolio. These estates provide additional rental units to accommodate the growing population in the Tung Chung New Town Extension (TCNTE) area. According to the Hong Kong Housing Authority, Cheung Tung Estate comprises 4,780 flats across five blocks: Cheung Yat House, Cheung Yuet House, Cheung Sing House, Cheung Fai House, and Cheung Yiu House.

=== Villages ===
Villages in the Tung Chung area include:

- Chek Lap Kok San Tsuen (赤鱲角新村)
- Ha Ling Pei (下嶺皮)
- Lam Che (藍輋)
- Lung Tseng Tau (龍井頭)
- Ma Wan (馬灣)
- Ma Wan Chung (馬灣涌)
- Mok Ka (莫家)
- Ngau Au (牛凹)
- Nim Yuen (稔園)
- Shan Ha (Pa Mei) (山下(壩尾))
- Shek Lau Po (石榴埔)
- Shek Mun Kap (石門甲)
- Sheung Ling Pei (上嶺皮)
- Tai Po (低埔)
- Wong Ka Wai (黃家圍)
- Wong Nei Uk (黃泥屋)

== Cultural heritage and attractions ==
=== Tung Chung Fort ===
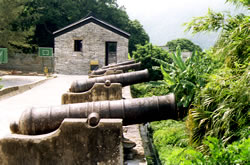
Tung Chung Fort, Lantau, Hong Kong

Tung Chung Fort was built in 1817, when the Qing Government was alarmed by the rampant piracy of Cheung Po Tsai (though Cheung himself had been captured seven years earlier) and decided to intervene and thwart the opium trade and defend the coast from pirates. The Fort was declared a monument in 1979. There are 6 old muzzle-loading cannons (still intact), each resting on a cement base and the enclosures are made of granite blocks, measuring 70 by 80 meters. Three arched gateways, each engraved with a Chinese inscription, are spaced along the walls. Tung Chung Fort itself went through several transformations. It was first used as a police station and then as a secondary school. Now, it is the base for the Rural Committee Office and the Tung Chung Public School.

=== Hau Wong Temple ===
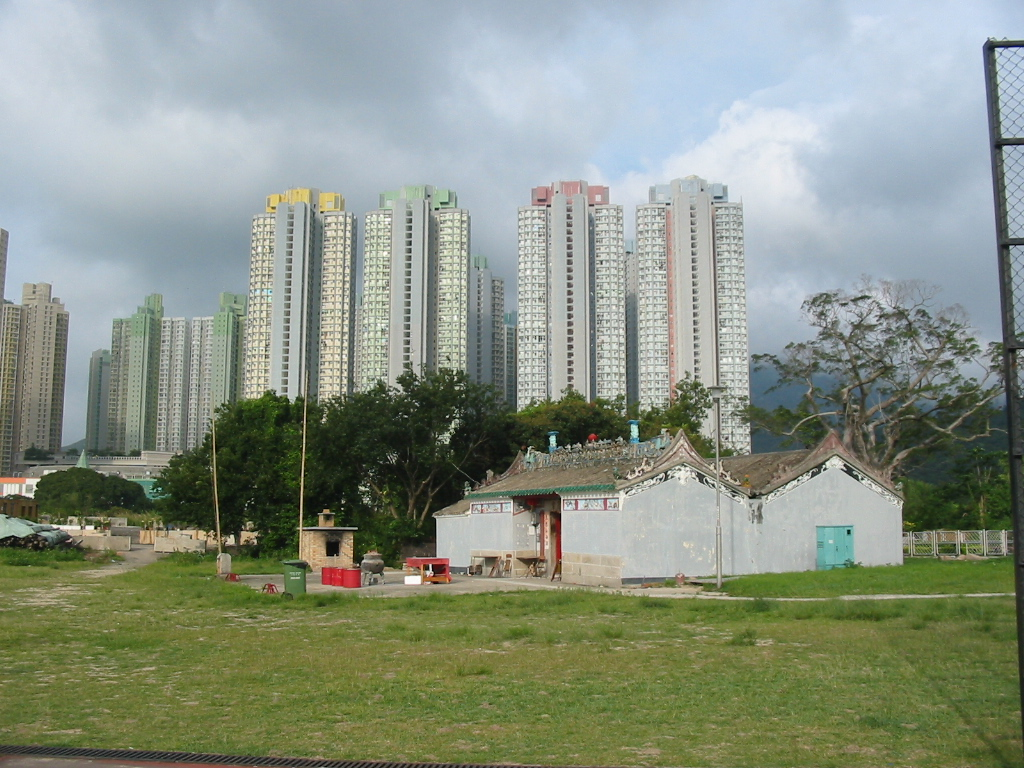
Hau Wong Temple

Hau Wong Temple, a tiered-roof structure built in 1765, is dedicated to Yeung Hau, a loyal court official of the Song dynasty who died with its last emperor. And this temple was a place for training soldiers in the Qing dynasty. There is a stele founded in 1777, which is an important product of culture for researches about the Qing dynasty. Recently renovated, the temple features lavish interior decorations. The temple is over 200 years old. The row of miniature human figures on the eaves looks still very real to life. On the 18th of the eighth month in the lunar calendar every year, there are activities such as Chinese operas and gatherings in the open area of the temple, to celebrate the birthday of Hau Wong.

The temple is twenty minutes walking distance from the train station.

=== Tin Hau Temple ===
A Tin Hau Temple is located in Chek Lap Kok New Village, Wong Lung Hang Road, Tung Chung. The temple was initially built in 1823 at the north east of Chek Lap Kok. It was dismantled in 1991 because of the construction of the new airport, and was rebuilt in 1994 at its present location. It is a Grade I historic building.

=== Tung Chung Battery ===
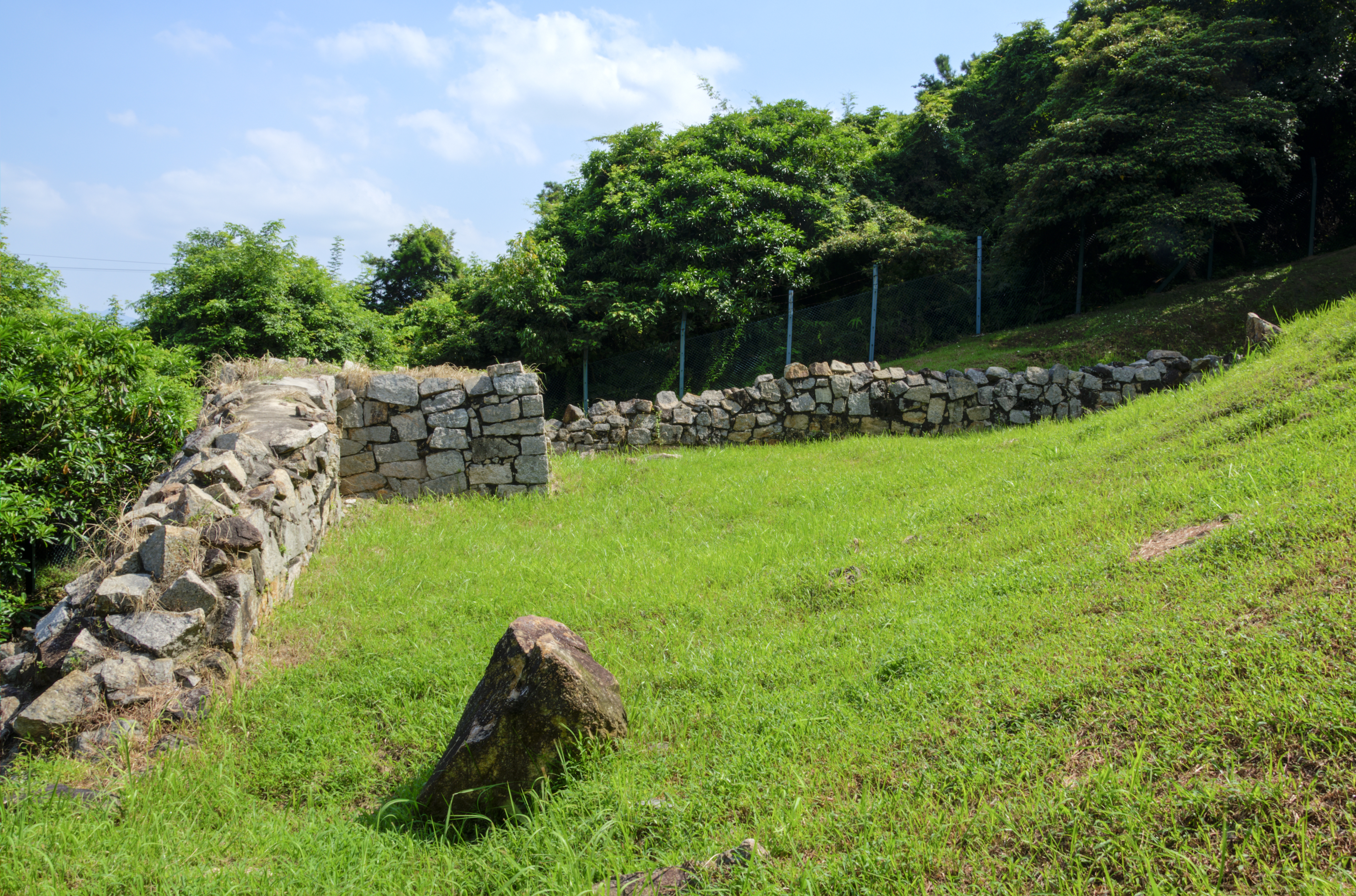
Tung Chung Battery

Tung Chung Battery was one of the two military forts built in 1817 at the foot of the Rocky Lion Hill at Tung Chung according to the Guangdong Annals. Its remains were discovered on a hill slope facing the sea near Tung Chung pier in 1980. An L-shaped wall with a platform at the corner, probably for gun emplacements, was revealed after clearing the dense undergrowth.

=== Lo Hon Temple ===
Lo Hon Monastery, at Shek Mun Kap. Built by lay Buddhists in 1974, it occupies the site of a grotto named Lo Hon Cavern where a hermit from Guangdong practiced Buddhism in 1926.

=== Ngong Ping: Big Buddha, Po Lin Monastery and Ngong Ping 360 ===
Tung Chung serves as the gateway for those wishing to explore Ngong Ping's Big Buddha, one of the world's largest seated Buddha statues, as well as Po Lin Monastery.

Ngong Ping can be reached by:

- The Ngong Ping 360 cable car
- Buses from Tung Chung Town Centre; plying between Tung Chung and Ngong Ping via Tung Chung Road and South Lantau Highway
- Hiking trail

== Nature and ecology ==
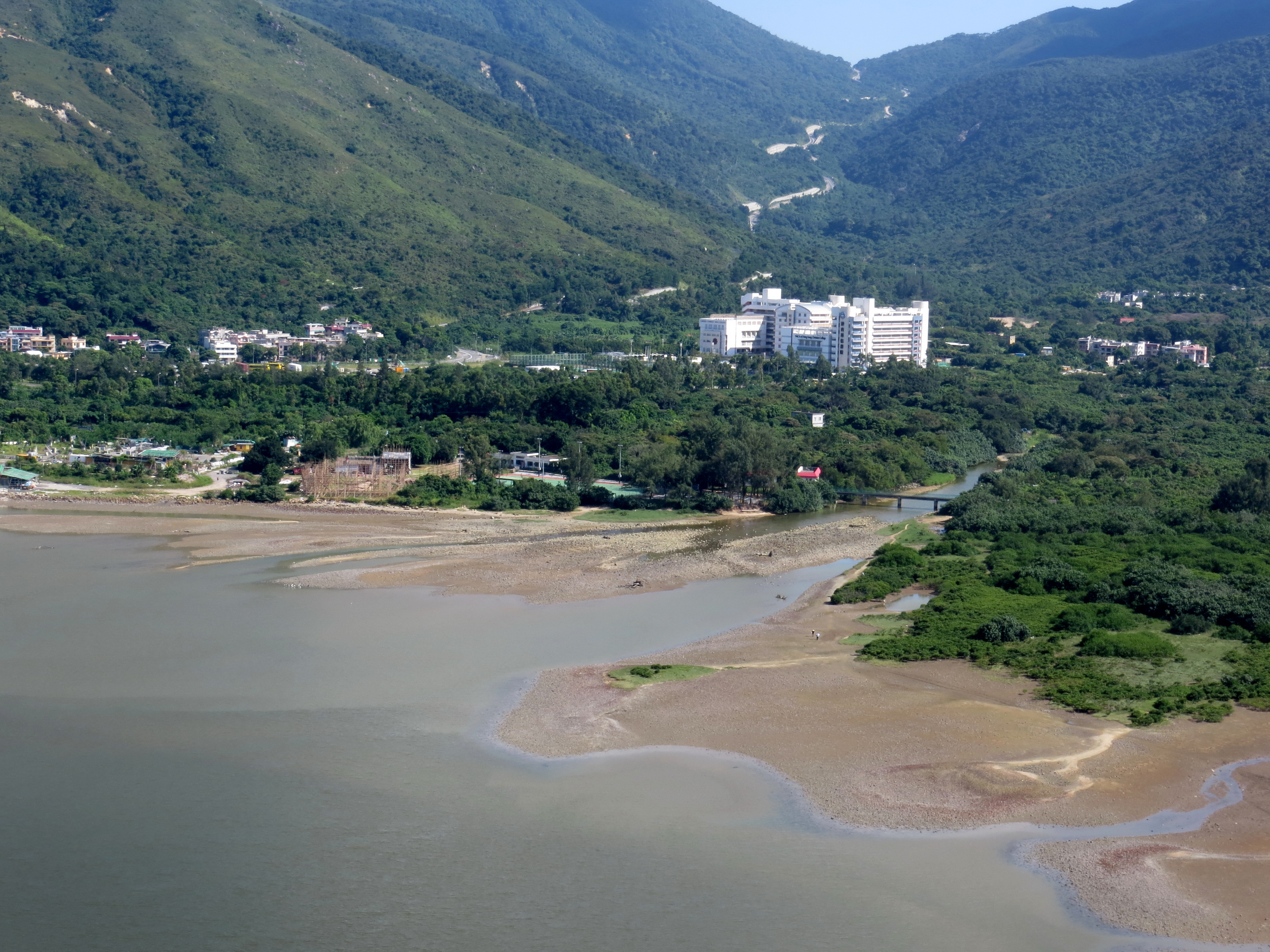
Tung Chung River

Tung Chung is surrounded by two large country parks, cover an area of Lantau Island as large as Hong Kong Island: The Lantau North and Lantau South Country Parks.

The presence of mangroves and freshwater streams in Tung Chung provides excellent ecologically valuable habitats for freshwater fish species, dragonflies and rare amphibians.

However, the reclamation and other civil engineering works in Tung Chung has heavily damaged these habitats and produced irreversible damage to native wildlife and the surrounding environment.

=== Tung Chung Valley ===
Tung Chung Valley is the home of some of the steepest and most primeval mountain streams in Hong Kong. The formation of spectacular waterfalls is facilitated in the presence of the sheer cliffs and deep gorges in the valley.

Almost all the streams in the area have their name related to Lung (the Chinese word for dragon) which is the Chinese mythological creature of the waters and the favorite metaphor for the towering waterfalls.

As the main branch of the Tung Chung Valley, the deep-set Wong Lung Valley is the home of the Wong Lung Stream (The Yellow Dragon). The mainstream has its source on the saddle at the east of Sunset Peak, but the stream collects water through a large network of feeder streams on both sides of the valley, including the famous Tung-Lung, Pak-Lung, Chong-Lung, and Ngo-Lung Streams, which are known collectively as "The Five Dragons of Tung Chung".

=== Wong Lung Waterfall ===
Wong Lung Waterfall is located in the Lantau North Country Park. It is named "Wong-Lung" since, during a heavy rainstorm, when we view from the high ground, the stream resembles a yellow dragon ready to take off for heaven when it and its feeders are flooded with torrential muddy water, with Wong-Lung as the trunk and the feeders its limbs.

=== Tung Lung Stream ===
The spectacular Tung Lung Stream includes what appear as continuous waterfalls of more than 700 feet (213 m). Tung Lung Stream is rich in varieties of rare local wild plants and animals, especially in the primeval forest at an upper stream, among them the unique Hong Kong newts (Paramesotriton hongkongensis) as well as several species of wild orchids.

=== Tung Chung River ===
Tung Chung River is the only known Hong Kong site for the rare fish, Acrossocheilus (Lissolichthys) wenchowensis beijiangensis (北江光唇魚) and one of only two sites on Lantau where the locally rare crested kingfisher, Megaceryle lugubris, has been recorded.

=== Upper Tung Chung Valley ===
The upper Tung Chung Valley is an important habitat for birds, including thrushes and warblers (Hopkin, pers. comm.). Eagle owls, a species highly sensitive to any disturbance around their nesting sites, breed here (Wilson, pers. comm.). The locally rare Hainan blue flycatcher probably breeds here (Chalmers, pers. comm.). The largest population of the reptile tokay gecko, Gekko gecko, occurs in the cliffs and boulder crevices in upper Tung Chung Valley (Lau, pers. comm.).

The woods in the upper Tung Chung Valley are reportedly some of the best on Lantau for rare plant species and for butterflies, including the birdwing butterfly which breeds here (Reels, pers. comm.).

=== Hiking trails ===
The Tung O Ancient Trail is a hiking trail that links Tung Chung to the fishing village of Tai O. This trail follows the north-western coast of Lantau Island; providing a view of the runway approach to Chek Lap Kok as well as a number of villages and local scenery. This, however is a strenuous four-hour trek.

An easier and well-wooded walk with picnic and barbecue sites also link Shui Hau to Tung Chung Road. Turning south from Tung Chung Road, visitors can get to the Cheung Sha beaches.

=== Hong Kong Buddhist Youth Camp ===
Located on a 4,877 m^{2} site near Tung Chung, the Buddhist Youth Camp was built in 1979 at a cost of HK$3 million, the camp is run by the Hong Kong Buddhist Association. Facilities available at the camp include table tennis, chess, books and television, playground for basketball, badminton, archery, barbecue and a swimming pool.

== Recreation ==
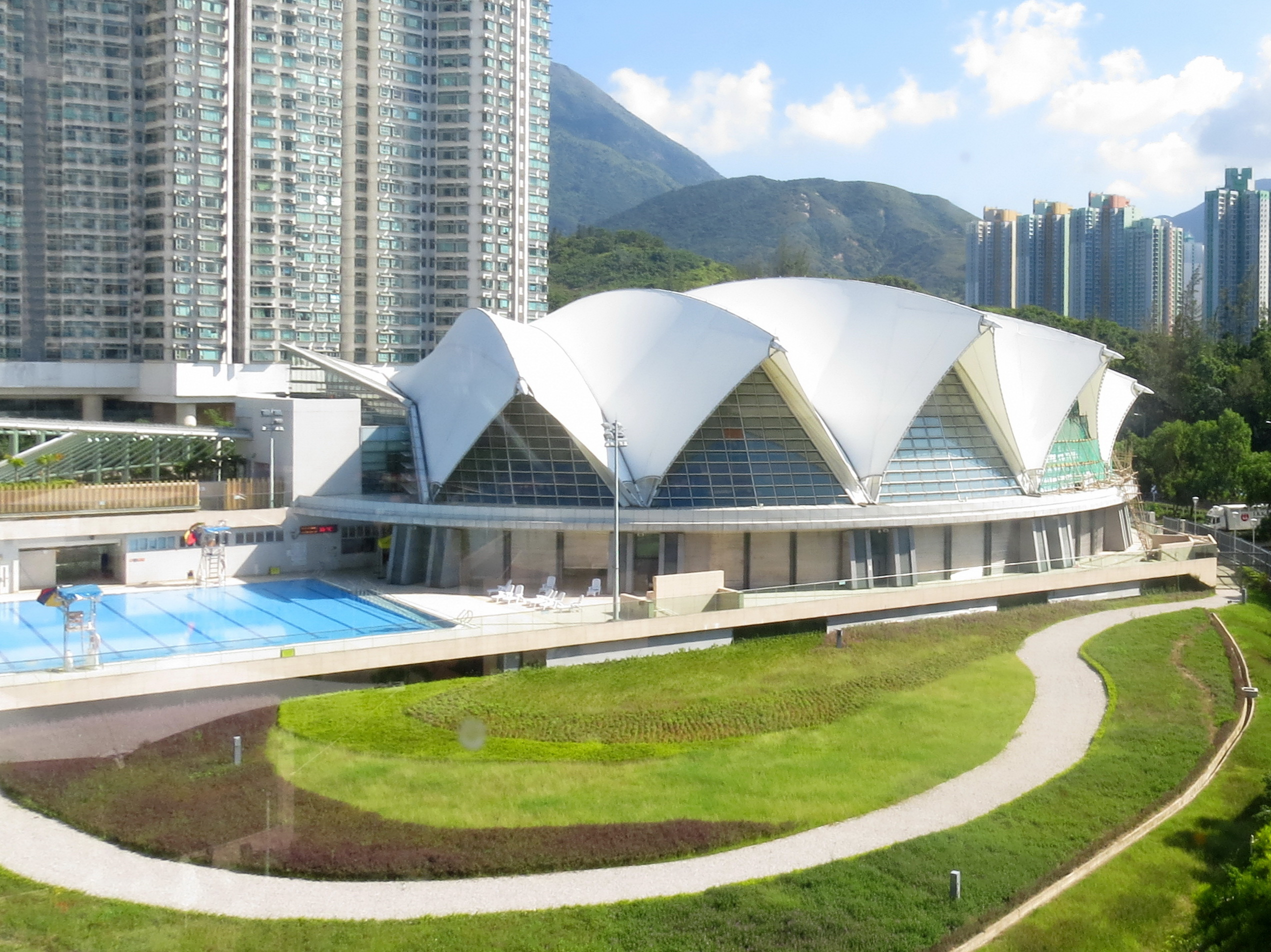
Tung Chung Swimming Pool

In a move to encourage green transport, on the model of most of the new towns, cycle tracks run throughout the town, and are widely used. Most of the private estates provides full clubhouse facilities for their residents. In October 2010, a public library opened, behind Citygate Outlets shopping center. In April 2011, a swimming pool opened near the Ngong Ping cable car.

In the future, an indoor games hall and community centre are planned for Tung Chung. Additionally, the Hong Kong Disneyland development at Penny's Bay will provide further recreational opportunities.

== Economy ==
=== Shopping and dining ===
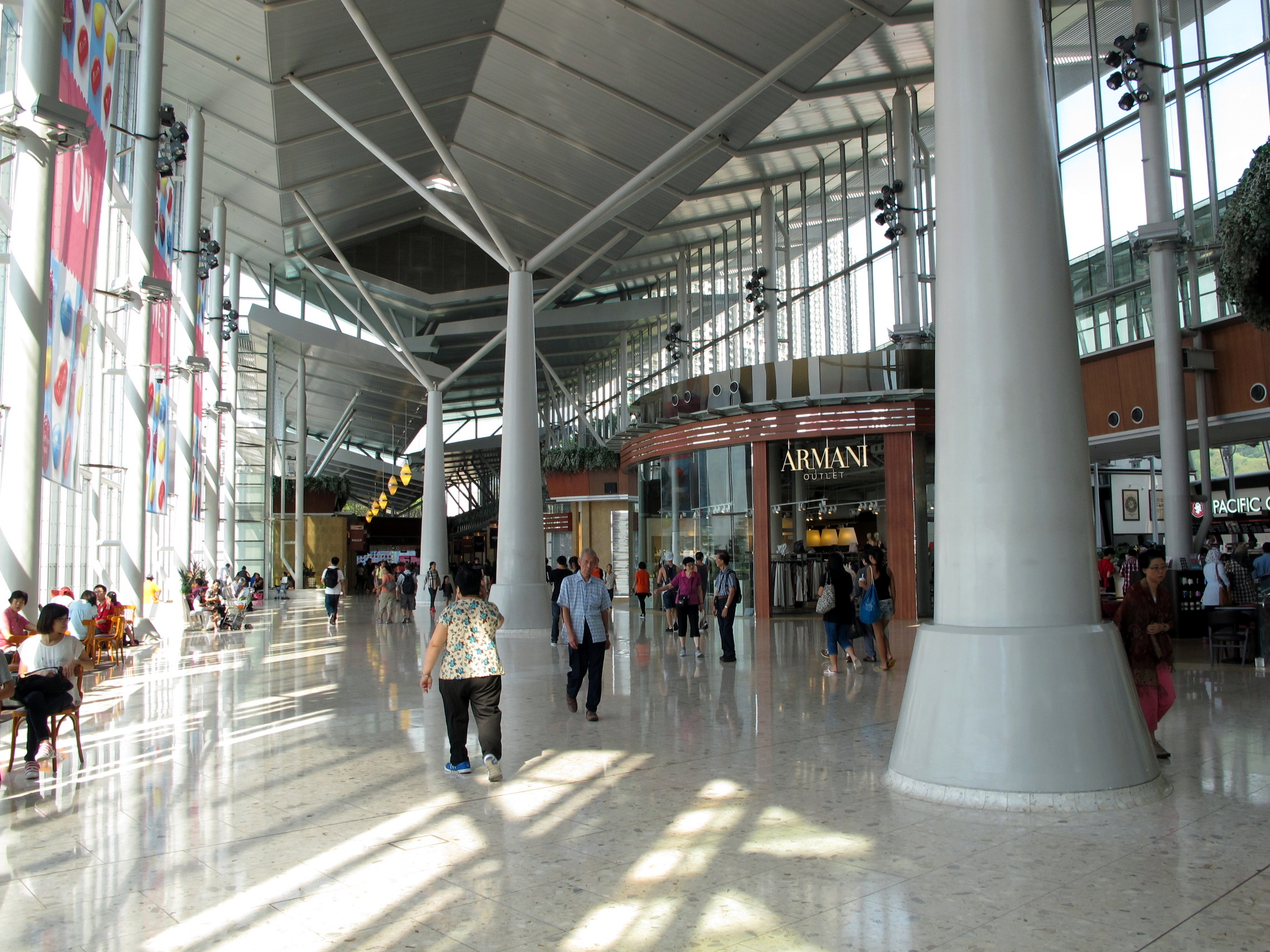
Citygate shopping center

Tung Chung Town Centre features a number of shops, restaurants, a cinema and entertainment facilities centered on the Citygate Outlets development; as well as transportation to Kowloon or Hong Kong Island. The Tung Chung Citygate Outlets have many factory outlets of high-end brands and other brands as well as offering huge discounts. Fu Tung Shopping Centre, Yat Tung Shopping Centre, and Citygate Outlets are the three shopping centres in Tung Chung thus far. Further shopping malls are expected at the new developments in Caribbean Coast. Tung Chung is 12 minutes from Tsing Yi and Kwai Tsing, where a much wider variety of shopping options are available.

Citygate Outlets is at the heart of this new town, developed in conjunction with the Tung Chung MTR station and bus terminus, thus providing a focal point to the town. Citygate, developed in the glass and steel style of the Hong Kong International Airport, contains 500,000 square feet (46,000 m^{2}) of shopping, entertainment, and food outlets spread across five floors. A square outside the mall contains a special fountain which performs a musical show regularly.

Yat Tung is a newer development; the first and second phase was completed in March 2001 and May 2002 respectively. It provides supermarkets, services, and a number of eating outlets.

Both Asian and Western cuisines are available at the many restaurants in Tung Chung, including Chinese, Vietnamese, Italian, American, Thai, Japanese, and Indian. It is also possible to have a meal at a temple behind the Tung Chung Battery and at a restaurant in Po Lin Monastery which serves vegetarian food. Near the Ngong Ping cable car terminal, there are restaurants and bars offering Asian and European dishes.

In Tung Chung, the prices of everyday items are generally higher than the urban areas because of the low competition of shops in Tung Chung. Some families need their seniors to use the $2 concessions for transportation to go to more urban areas like Tsing Yi and Tsuen Wan to buy cheaper items.

=== Corporate ===
The head offices of Greater Bay Airlines, Hong Kong Airlines, and Metrojet Limited are in One Citygate in Tung Chung. HK Express was formerly at One Citygate.

=== Hotels ===
- Novotel Citygate is Tung Chung's first hotel. It opened early 2006.
- Hong Kong Skycity Marriott Hotel, located minutes away from Tung Chung MTR station, opened in late 2008.
- Sheraton Hotel, located next to the Century Link private housing development, opened in late 2020.
- Four Points by Sheraton, attached to the Sheraton Hotel building, opened in late 2020.
- The Silveri Hong Kong-MGallery, opened in June, 2020.

== Education ==
=== Primary and secondary schools ===
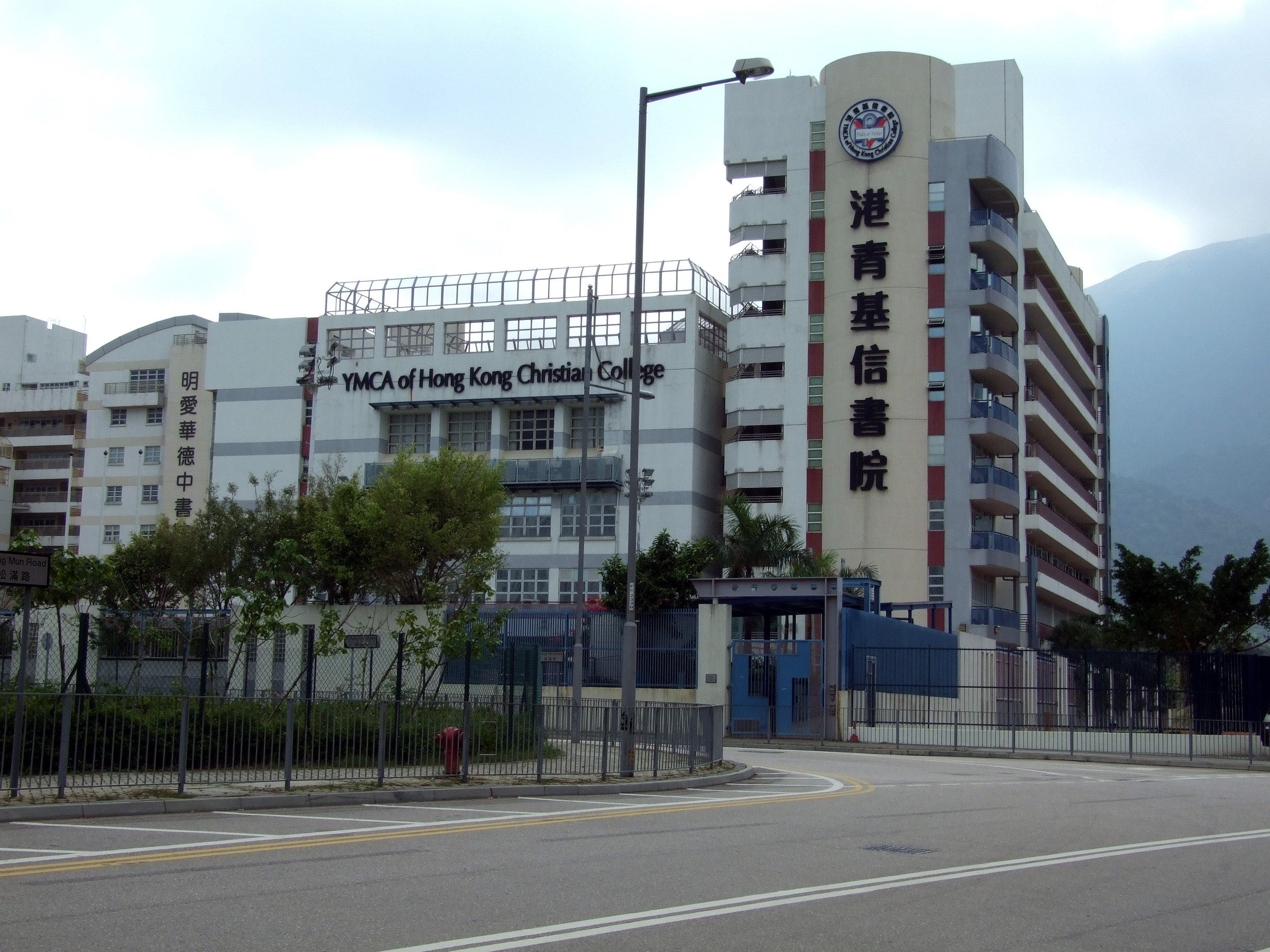
YMCA of Hong Kong Christian College, the only EMI school within Tung Chung.

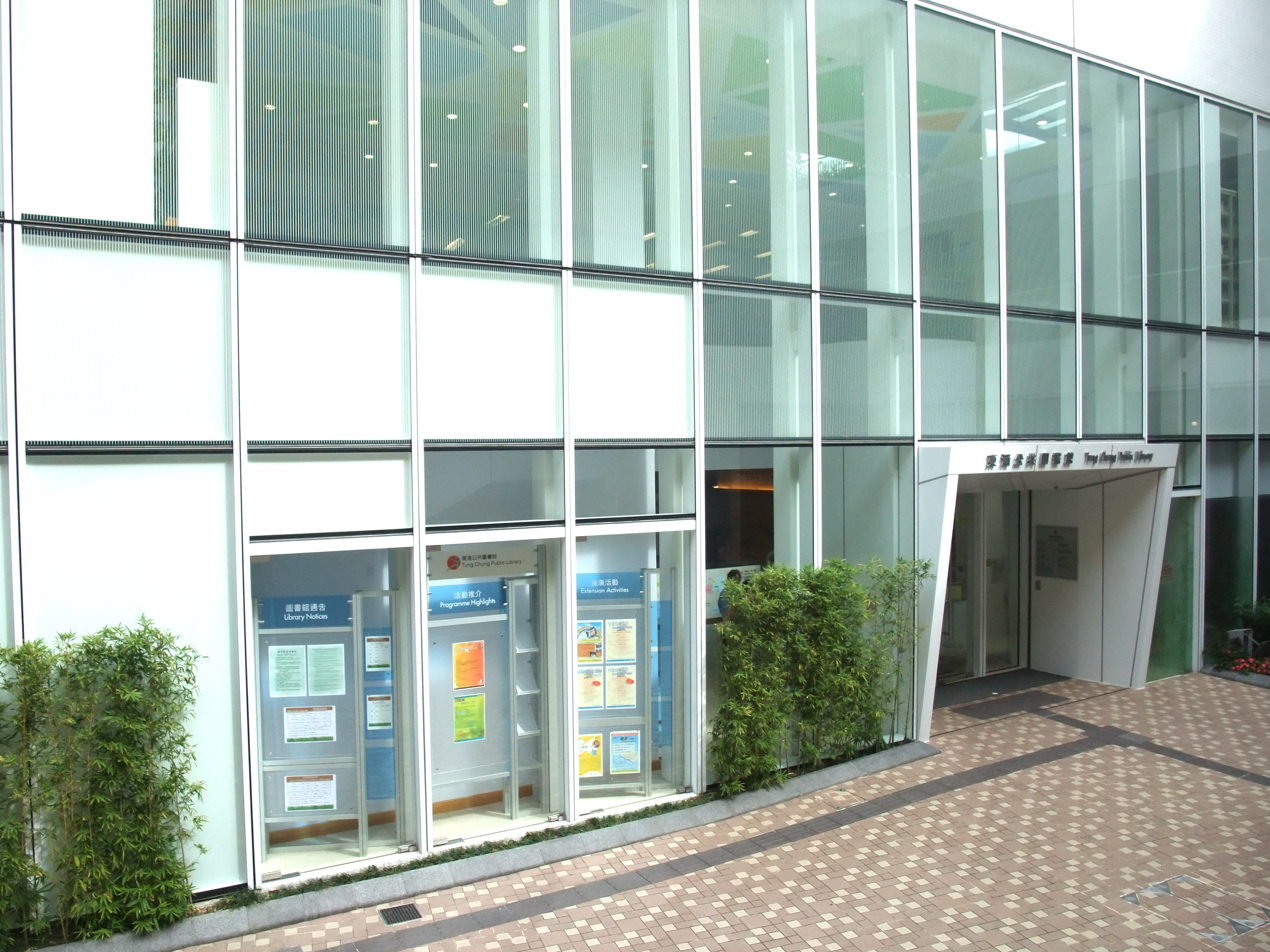
Tung Chung Public Library

Tung Chung is in Primary One Admission (POA) School Net 98, which contains multiple aided schools (privately-operated schools funded with government money) on Lantau Island, including seven in Tung Chung; no government primary schools are in this net.

Primary (all are in POA98)

- Ching Chung Hau Po Woon Primary School (青松侯寶垣小學)
- Hong Kong Federation of Education Workers (HKFEW) Wong Cho Bau School (香港教育工作者聯會黃楚標學校)
- Ho Yu Primary School (嗇色園主辦可譽小學) Sponsored by Sik Sik Yuen
- Ling Liang Church Sau Tak Primary School (靈糧堂秀德小學)
- Po On Commercial Association Wan Ho Kan Primary School (寶安商會溫浩根小學)
- The Salvation Army Lam Butt Chung Memorial School (救世軍林拔中紀念學校)
- Tung Chung Catholic School

Tung Chung Fort formerly housed Wa Ying College. In 2003 the Tung Chung Public Primary School (東涌公立學校), which was located in Tung Chung Fort, ceased operations. It closed during a wave of closure of village schools in the territory.

Secondary

- Caritas Charles Vath College
- HKFEW Wong Cho Bau Secondary School
- Ho Yu College - Sponsored by Sik Sik Yuen
- Ling Liang Church E Wun Secondary School
- Po Leung Kuk Mrs. Ma Kam Ming-Cheung Fook Sien College
- Tung Chung Catholic School (Yat Tung)
- YMCA of Hong Kong Christian College

=== Public libraries ===
Hong Kong Public Libraries operates Tung Chung Public Library, which is located in the Tung Chung Municipal Services Building.

== Future development ==
The planned population for Tung Chung New Town is projected at 124,000 residents. The expansion will expand the New Town to the west and east of the existing one. It will provide 49,400 residential flats as proposed under the P & E study. Land has been reserved at the expansion area for recreational, education and community use like sport grounds and schools, the first population intake is targeted for the early 2020s. The project will include reclaiming 130 hectares (ha) of land.

== Transportation ==
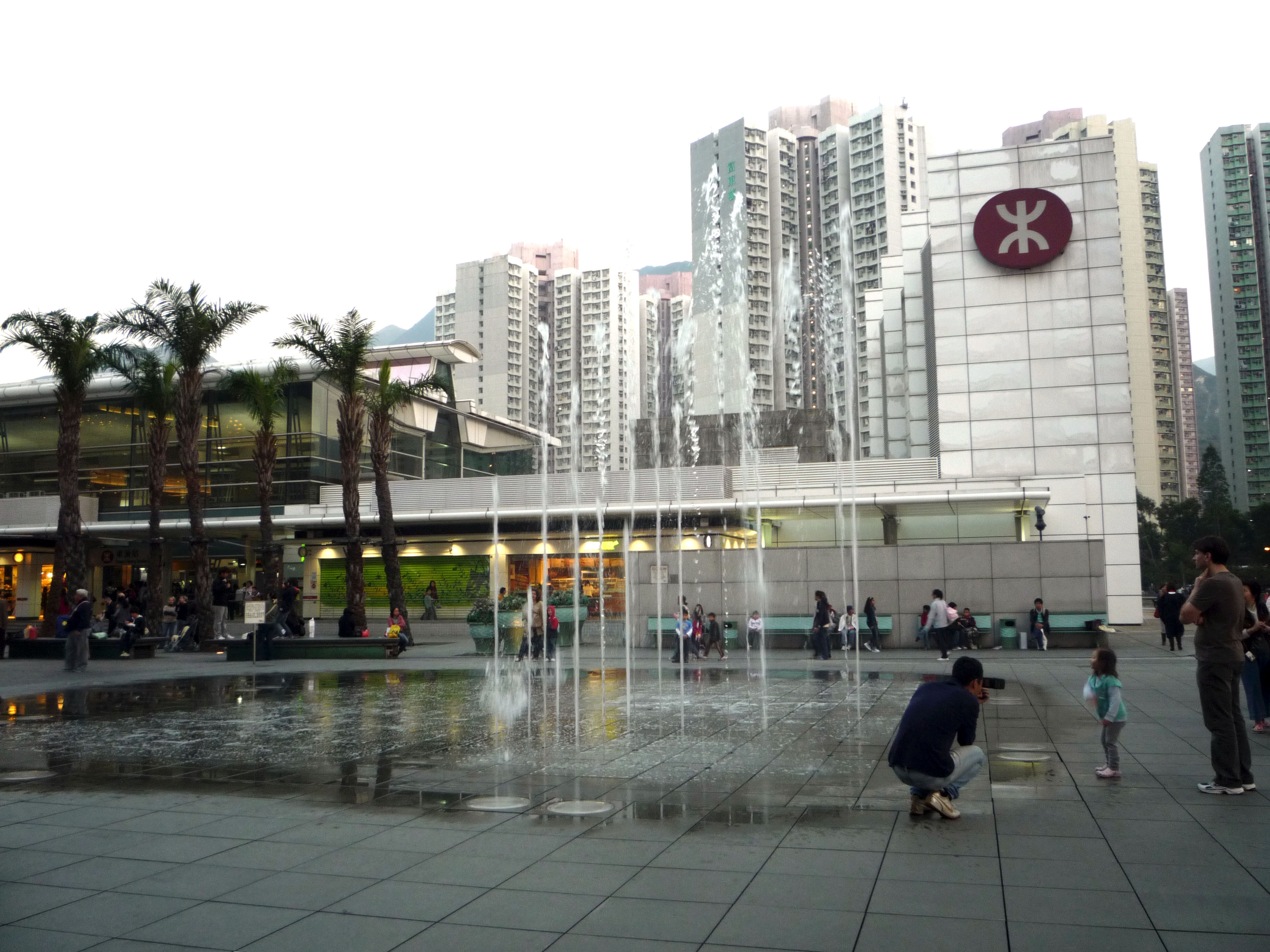
Tung Chung station

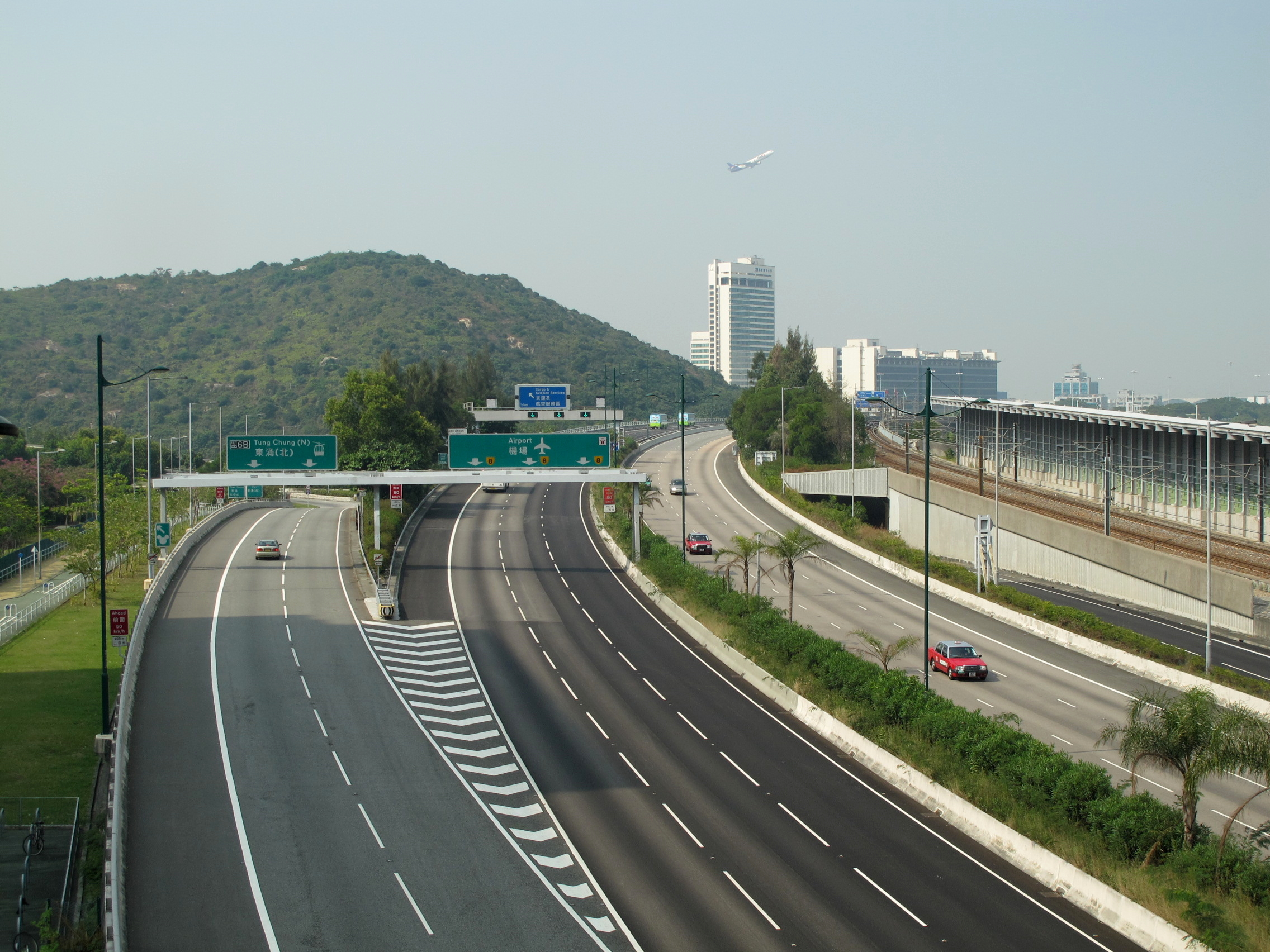
North Lantau Highway (Tung Chung Section)

Tung Chung is connected to the rest of Hong Kong via massive infrastructure projects. The main road link, the North Lantau Highway connects Tung Chung to the rest of Hong Kong via the Tsing Ma Bridge. Public transport options include buses, trains, and ferries. The Hong Kong International Airport is about 10 minutes of traveling time from Tung Chung. A gondola lift, called Ngong Ping 360, can take travelers up to the monastery in Ngong Ping.

The Hong Kong–Zhuhai–Macau Bridge begins near Tung Chung and connects to Zhuhai and Macau.

=== Train ===
Tung Chung is served by the Tung Chung line of the MTR system. Tung Chung station is situated in the centre of the new town. It is possible to travel to Kowloon and Hong Kong Island conveniently in less than 30 minutes. Passengers may change to the Tsuen Wan line, Tuen Ma Line and Island line at Lai King station, Nam Cheong station and Hong Kong station respectively.

Two new MTR stations are planned for Tung Chung, namely: Tung Chung West station and Tung Chung East station.

=== Bus ===
Three bus companies serve the Tung Chung area. Two of them, Citybus Limited and Long Win Holdings Limited, a wholly owned subsidiary of Kowloon Motor Bus, connect the Tung Chung New Town with outside areas. The Hong Kong International Airport is connected to Tung Chung by a frequent bus service "S1" operated by the two companies.

Tung Chung is also a hub for bus routes to the rest of Lantau Island. Bus services operated by the New Lantao Bus company carry residents and holiday travelers to places including Mui Wo, Ngong Ping, Tai O and Cheung Sha.

=== Roads ===
The western part of Route 8, consisted of Tsing Ma Bridge, Kap Shui Mun Bridge and North Lantau Highway, connects Tung Chung with the central business districts of Hong Kong.

The new Tuen Mun–Chek Lap Kok Link connects Tung Chung with Northwestern New Territories, while the cross-border Hong Kong–Zhuhai–Macau Bridge (HZMB) connects Tung Chung with Macau and Mainland Zhuhai.

Tung Chung Road, a winding mountain road, connects Lantau South with Tung Chung and the rest of Hong Kong.

=== Ferry ===
There is a scheduled ferry service from Tai O and Tuen Mun, via Tung Chung New Development Ferry Pier and Sha Lo Wan, operated by Fortune Ferry. There is also another ferry service from Tung Chung to Tai O four times per day (five on Sundays and Public Holidays). This provides spectacular sea views of the North Lantau coast, home to the Chinese white dolphin.

=== Ngong Ping Cable Car ===
The Ngong Ping 360 is a 5.7-km cableway that links Tung Chung and Ngong Ping via angled stations at Airport Island and Nei Lak Shan. Ngong Ping is the home of the Big Buddha and Po Lin Monastery. The Ngong Ping 360 and Ngong Ping Village form the Ngong Ping 360 tourism project. Following an accident involving one of the cable cars falling from the ropeway in June 2007, Ngong Ping Cable Car services were suspended until passenger safety could be guaranteed. Ngong Ping 360 is now fully operational.

== See also ==
- List of buildings, sites, and areas in Hong Kong
