= Yat Tung Estate =

Housing estate in Tung Chung, New Territories

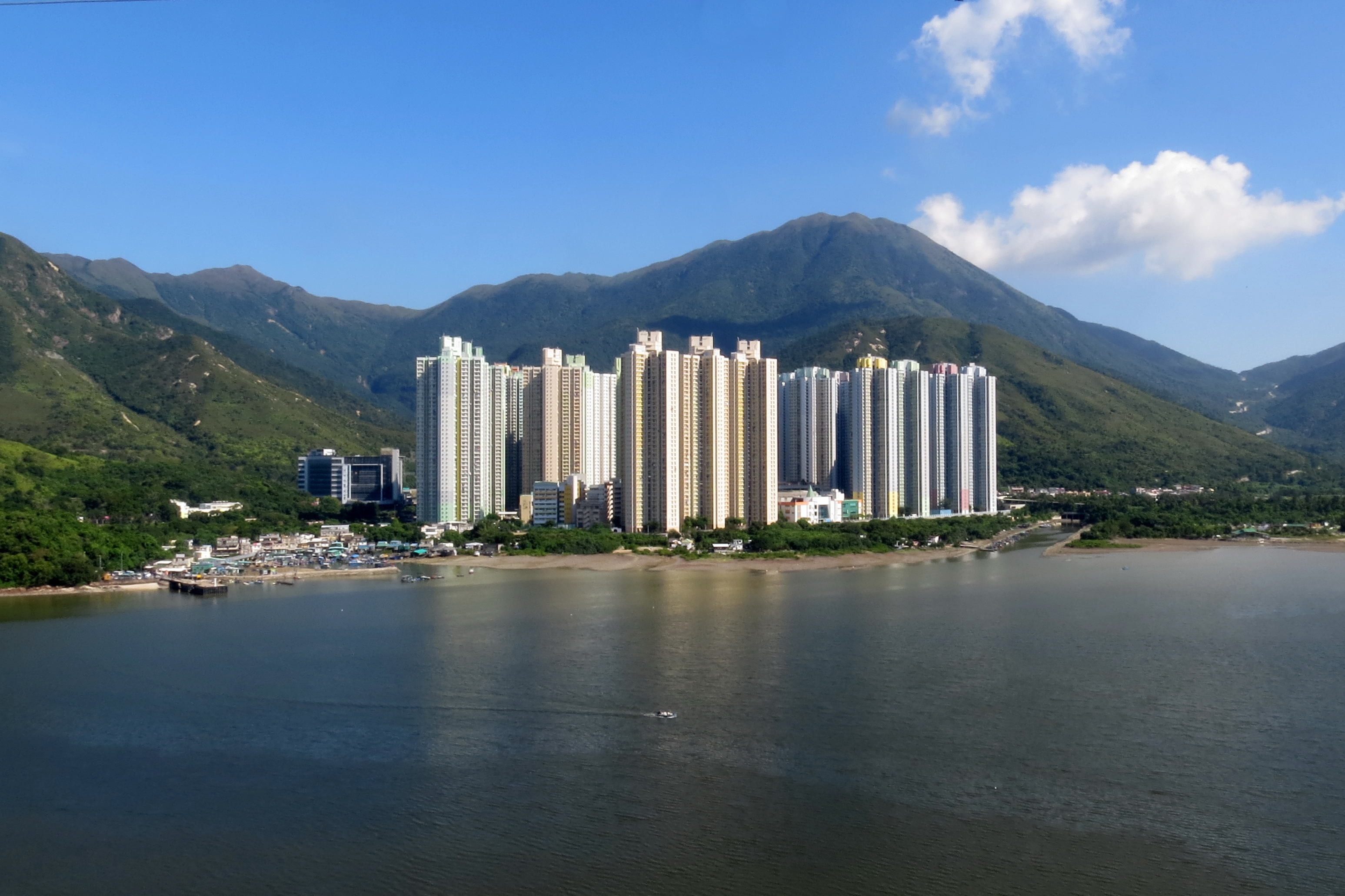
Overview of Yat Tung Estate

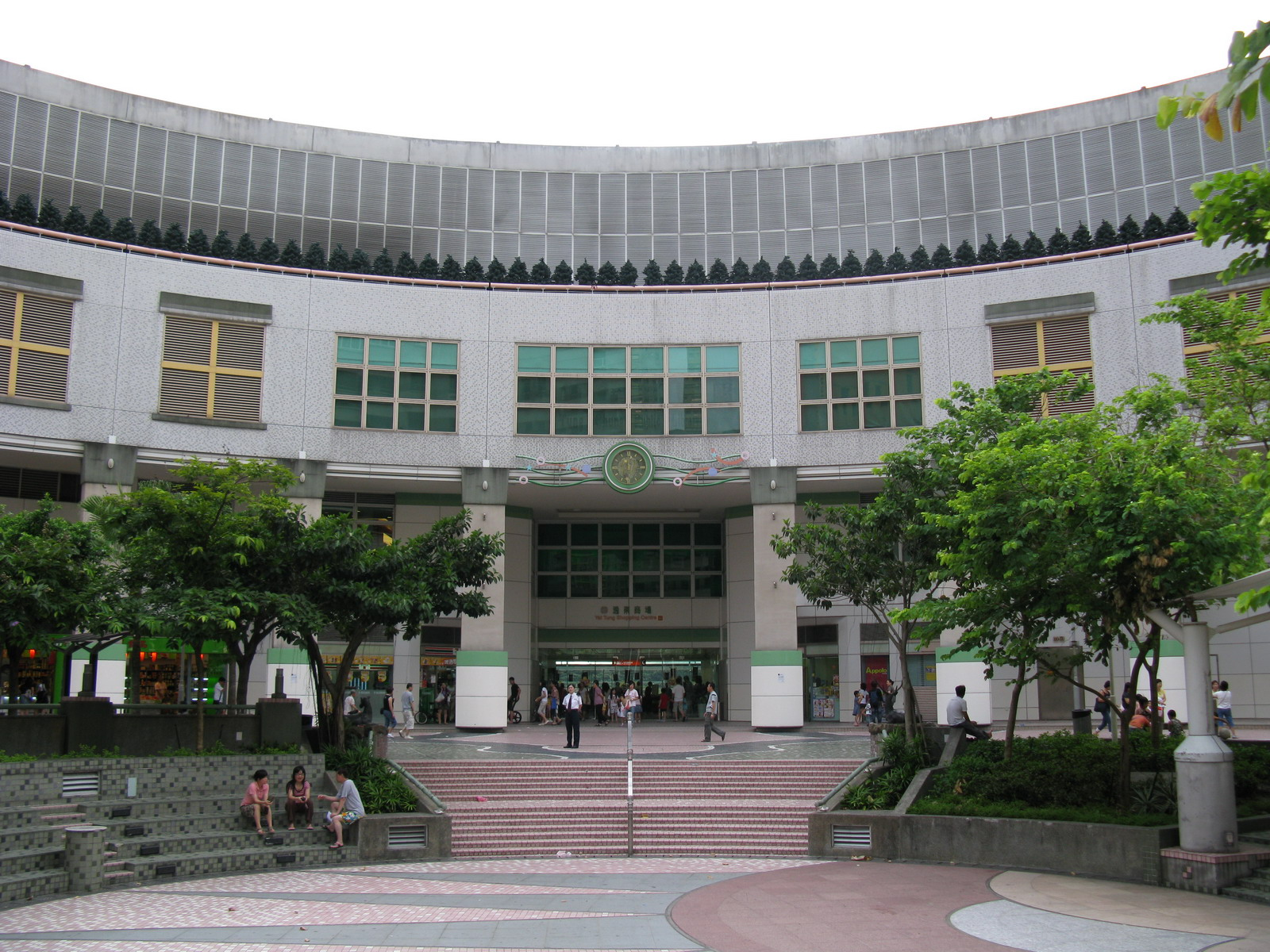
Yat Tung Shopping Centre

Yat Tung Estate (Chinese: 逸東邨; Jyutping: jat6 dung1 cyun1) is a public housing estate in the western part of Tung Chung, Lantau Island, Hong Kong. It is divided into Yat Tung (I) Estate and Yat Tung (II) Estate, which collectively have a population of 36,913.

Yu Tai Court (Chinese: 裕泰苑) is a Home Ownership Scheme court in Tung Chung, near Yat Tung Estate and North Lantau Hospital. It has two residential blocks completed in 2020.

== History ==
=== Background ===
Yat Tung Estate was built as part of the North Lantau New Town, one of the core projects of the Airport Core Programme. More specifically, Yat Tung Estate was part of the Tung Chung Development Phase II.

Originally, Yat Tung Estate was to comprise homes for subsidised sale, but the Hong Kong Government suspended the Home Ownership Scheme (HOS) in 2003 due to a soft property market and pressure from real estate developers. As a result, Yat Tung Estate is entirely public rental housing.

=== Construction ===
Yat Tung Estate was constructed in several phases by several different contractors. The construction of Yat Tung (I) Estate was affected by corruption that resulted in the jailing of several contractors.

==== Tung Chung Area 30 Phase 1 ====
Now part of Yat Tung (I) Estate, this phase comprises three residential blocks. The piling contractor was Hsin Chong (Foundations).

==== Tung Chung Area 30 Phase 2 ====
Now part of Yat Tung (I) Estate, this phase was constructed by Hsin Chong.

==== Tung Chung Area 30 Phase 3 ====
Also now part of Yat Tung (I) Estate, this phase was constructed by Cheung Kee Fung Cheung Construction (CKFC). This phase comprises four 41-storey Concord 1 (Option 2) blocks originally intended for HOS use, but let out as public rental housing. The piling contractor was Hsin Chong (Foundations). These four blocks, completed in 2001, are today called Yu Yat House, Ying Yat House, Luk Yat House, and Fuk Yat House.

In 2000, the ICAC arrested six contracting staff for the using of substandard materials. An independent audit confirmed that the superstructure of the housing blocks contain some non-compliant reinforcement bars. However, the consultants certified that the structural integrity of the buildings was not compromised.

==== Tung Chung Area 30 Phase 4 ====
Tung Chung Area 30 Phase 4 involved the first phase of the shopping centre.

==== Tung Chung Area 31 Phase 3 ====
This contract was constructed by Yau Lee Construction Company. It comprises five 41-storey New Cruciform I residential blocks. Construction began in 2001 and was completed by mid-2004.

=== COVID-19 pandemic ===
During the COVID-19 pandemic in Hong Kong, Ying Yat House of (I) Estate was put under lockdown for mandatory testing from 20 February 2022. Fuk Yat House and Yu Yat House were sealed on 28 February.

== Demographics ==
According to the 2016 by-census, Yat Tung Estate has a total population of 36,913. This declined from 39,312 in the 2011 census. According to the Housing Authority, the estate is designed for an authorised population of 40,400.

== Blocks ==
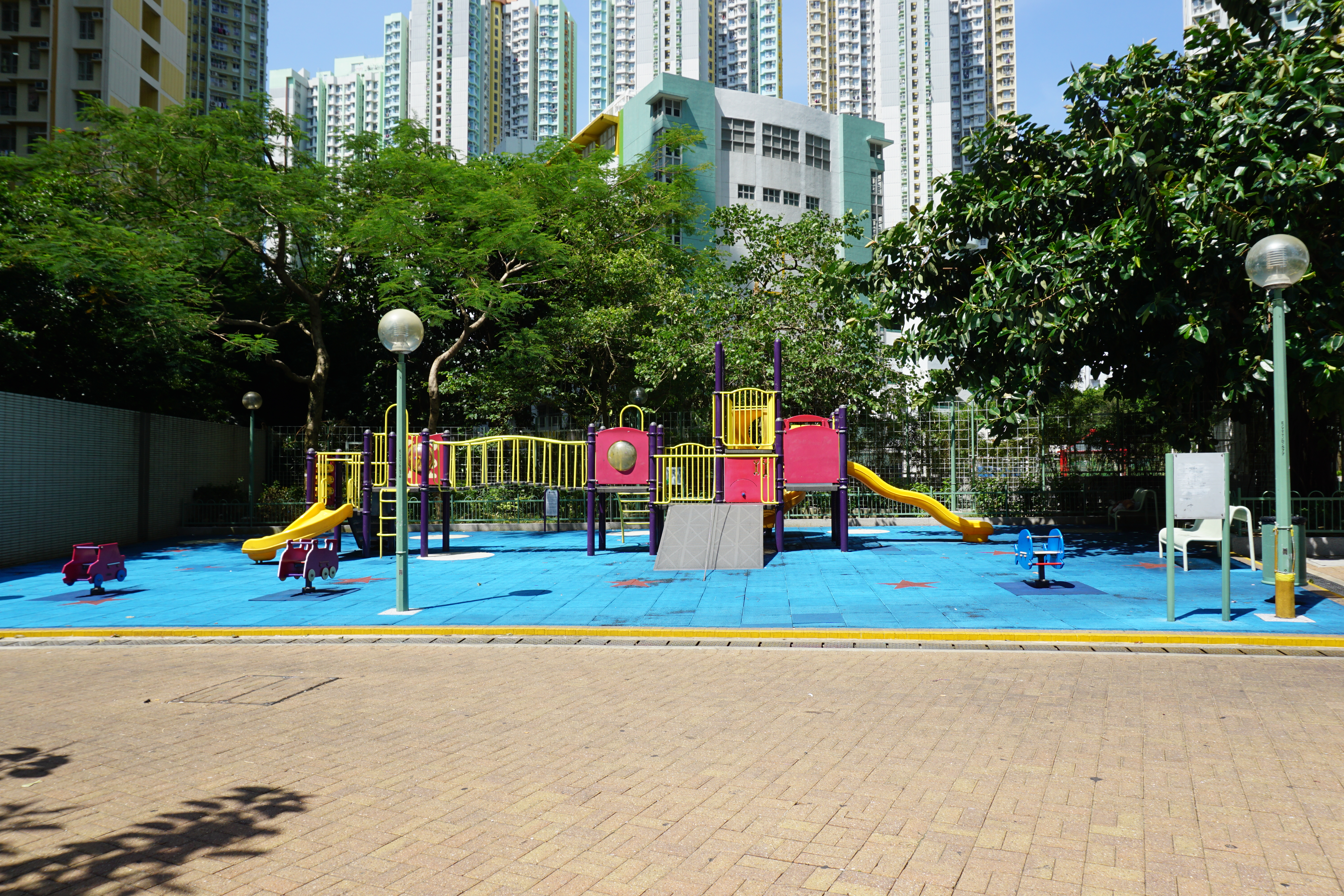
Children's playground

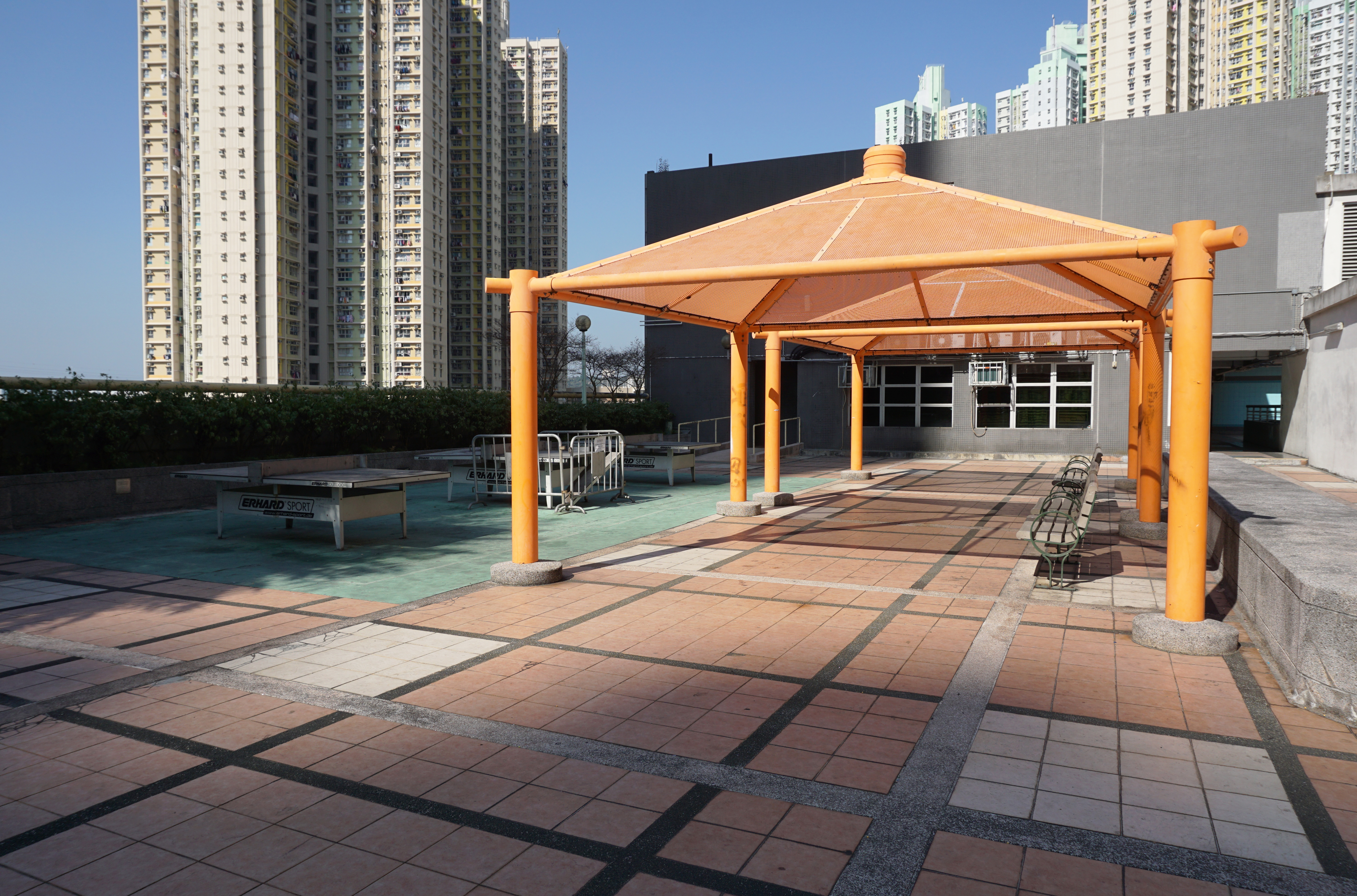
Table tennis area

=== Yat Tung (I) Estate ===
English name	Chinese name	Block type	Year of completion
Yung Yat House (Block A)	雍逸樓（A座）	Harmony 1	2001
Ching Yat House (Block B)	清逸樓（B座）	Harmony 1	2001
Hong Yat House (Block C)	康逸樓（C座）	Harmony 1	2001
Fuk Yat House (Block 1)	福逸樓（第1座）	Concord 1	2001
Luk Yat House (Block 2)	祿逸樓（第2座）	Concord 1	2001
Ying Yat House (Block 3)	迎逸樓（第3座）	Concord 1	2001
Yu Yat House (Block 4)	漁逸樓（第4座）	Concord 1	2001
Chau Yat House (Block 5)	舟逸樓（第5座）	Concord 1	2001
Tai Yat House (Block 6)	太逸樓（第6座）	Concord 1	2001
Ping Yat House (Block 7)	平逸樓（第7座）	Concord 1	2001
Heung Yat House (Block 8)	享逸樓（第8座）	Concord 1	2001
Chi Yat House (Block 9)	至逸樓（第9座）	Concord 1	2001
Sin Yat House (Block 10)	善逸樓（第10座）	Concord 1	2001

=== Yat Tung (II) Estate ===
English name	Chinese name	Block type	Year of completion
Mei Yat House (Block D)	美逸樓（D座）	New Harmony 1	2005
Mun Yat House (Block E)	滿逸樓（E座）	New Harmony 1	2005
Kui Yat House (Blocks F and G)	居逸樓（F座為主座及G座為附翼）	New Harmony 1 with New Harmony Annex 5	2005
Kan Yat House (Block 11)	勤逸樓（第11座）	New Cruciform (Ver.1999)	2004
Kit Yat House (Block 12)	傑逸樓（第12座）	New Cruciform (Ver.1999)	2004
Po Yat House (Block 13)	寶逸樓（第13座）	New Cruciform (Ver.1999)	2004
Chui Yat House (Block 14)	翠逸樓（第14座）	New Cruciform (Ver.1999)	2004
Yuet Yat House (Block 15)	悅逸樓（第15座）	New Cruciform (Ver.1999)	2004
Sui Yat House (Block 16)	瑞逸樓（第16座）	New Cruciform (Ver.1999)	2004
Tak Yat House (Block 17)	德逸樓（第17座）	New Cruciform (Ver.1999)	2004
Him Yat House (Block 18)	謙逸樓（第18座）	New Cruciform (Ver.1999)	2004
Shun Yat House (Block 19)	信逸樓（第19座）	New Cruciform (Ver.1999)	2004

=== Yu Tai Court ===
English name	Chinese name	Block type	Year of completion
Yu Yuet House (Block A)	裕玥閣 (A座)	Non-standard	2020
Yu Ying House (Block B)	裕瑛閣 (B座)	Non-standard	2020

== Education ==
There are several schools located at Yat Tung Estate:

- HKFEW Wong Cho Bau School (primary)
- The Salvation Army Lam Butt Chung Memorial School (primary)
- Tung Chung Catholic School (primary and secondary)

== Transport ==
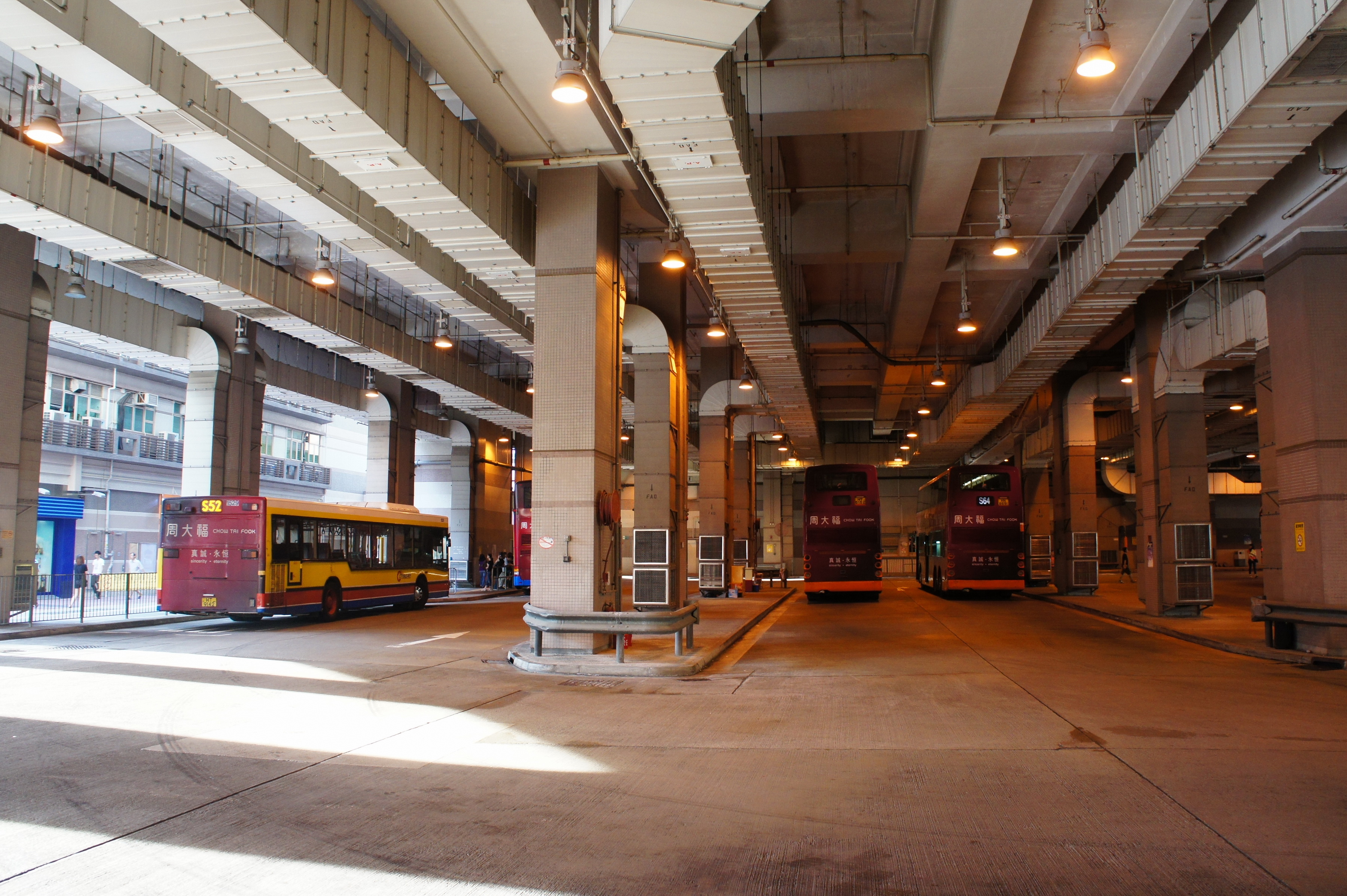
Bus terminus

Residents of Yat Tung Estate rely on buses to connect to the Tung Chung station, the terminus of the Tung Chung line of the Mass Transit Railway (MTR). Franchised bus services are provided by New Lantao Bus (NLB). There is also a cycle track network that links the estate to Tung Chung town centre.

The poor transport, coupled with the relative remoteness of the estate, has led to much criticism. Residents, social workers, and district councillors have complained that the situation has contributed to financial hardship, as there are limited job opportunities and transport is expensive for the lower class. Financial hardship has, in turn, been attributed to social problems and family tragedies.

There is a space next to the estate reserved for the long-delayed Tung Chung West station, a proposed one-stop extension of the Tung Chung line. According to the Railway Development Strategy 2014, the projected cost would be HK$6 billion. The report recommends that the extension be built between 2020 and 2024 to coincide with the opening of new public housing developments near Yat Tung Estate.
