= Shek Lau Po =

Coordinates: 22.273634°N 113.930937°E

Shek Lau Po (Chinese: 石榴埔) is a village in Tung Chung on Lantau Island, Hong Kong.

== Administration ==
Shek Lau Po is a recognized village under the New Territories Small House Policy.
