= Lung Tseng Tau =

Coordinates: 22.276104°N 113.934175°E

Lung Tseng Tau (Chinese: 龍井頭) is a village in Tung Chung on Lantau Island, Hong Kong.

== Administration ==
Lung Tseng Tau is a recognized village under the New Territories Small House Policy.
