= Ngau Au =

Coordinates: 22.276365°N 113.927551°E

Ngau Au (Chinese: 牛凹) is a village in Tung Chung on Lantau Island, Hong Kong.

== Administration ==
Ngau Au is a recognized village under the New Territories Small House Policy.
