= Nim Yuen =

Coordinates: 22.272405°N 113.927197°E

Nim Yuen (Chinese: 稔園), also transliterated as Nim Un, is a village in Tung Chung on Lantau Island, Hong Kong.

== Administration ==
Nim Yuen is a recognized village under the New Territories Small House Policy.
