= Mok Ka =

Village in Tung Chung, Hong Kong

Coordinates: 22.270544°N 113.929061°E

Mok Ka (Chinese: 莫家) is a village in Tung Chung on Lantau Island, Hong Kong.

== Administration ==
Mok Ka is a recognized village under the New Territories Small House Policy.
