= Lam Che =

Coordinates: 22.273901°N 113.926975°E

Lam Che (Chinese: 藍輋) is a village in Tung Chung on Lantau Island, Hong Kong.

== Administration ==
Lam Che is a recognized village under the New Territories Small House Policy.
