= Po Leung Kuk Mrs. Ma Kam Ming-Cheung Fook Sien College =

Coordinates: 22.2877°N 113.9438°E

Po Leung Kuk Mrs. Ma Kam Ming-Cheung Fook Sien College Chinese: 保良局馬錦明夫人章馥仙中學

Location
- Fu Tung Estate, Tung Chung; Hong Kong

Information
- School type: Subsidized school, Grammar school
- Motto: "" (Chinese) ("Love, Respect, Dignity and Sincerity")
- Established: 1997; 29 years ago
- Principal: Ms. Joanna, Or Yuk King
- Staff: 58
- Grades: Form 1 to Form 6
- Enrollment: 747
- Education system: HKDSE(formerly HKALE and HKHLE)
- Language: Chinese and English
- Houses: Red, Yellow, Blue, Green
- Student Union/Association: Nova
- Song: School song commonly used for Po Leung Kuk Schools
- Mascot: Skylar
- Alumni: exists
- Website: http://www.plkcfs.edu.hk

Po Leung Kuk Mrs. Ma Kam Ming-Cheung Fook Sien College (Chinese: 保良局馬錦明夫人章馥仙中學) is a full-time grammar school situated in Tung Chung, Lantau, Hong Kong, beside Fu Tung Estate and Tung Chung station. Dr. Ma Kam Ming, a Po Leung Kuk consultant, donated HK$5 million to finance the establishment of the school in 1997.

Its new wing was inaugurated officially in February 2007 during the celebrations of the 10th anniversary of its founding. Together with the old wing, the 7-story complex comprises a total of 26 standard classrooms, three remedial teaching rooms, four multimedia rooms, and various special rooms. This would allow more spaces for teaching when the '3+3+4' schooling system is implemented in 2009.

== Facilities ==
Computer Room, Multi-Media Learning Centre, Computer-Aided Learning Room, Student Activity Centre, Multi-Purpose Room, Library, Campus TV Studio. The campus is air-conditioned. All classrooms and special rooms are equipped with computers and LCD projectors. Wireless access points are installed, so teachers and students can connect to the Internet anywhere on campus.
