= Tai Po (Tung Chung) =

Village in Hong Kong

Coordinates: 22.27962°N 113.94118°E

Tai Po New Village or Tei Po New Village (Chinese: 低埔新村) is a village in Tung Chung, Lantau Island, Hong Kong. It is the resettlement village of the former nearby Tai Po Village (低埔村).

== Administration ==
Tai Po is a recognized village under the New Territories Small House Policy.

== History ==
In 1955, Austin Coates described the villages as a small coastal village just east of the main Tung Chung Valley, dating from the first decade of the New Territories lease, while James W. Hayes reported a population of 38 in 1957–58.

== See also ==
- Chek Lap Kok San Tsuen, the nearby relocated village of the former village on Chek Lap Kok island.
