= Ling Liang Church E Wun Secondary School =

Coordinates: 22°17′26.1774″N 113°56′40.8042″E

Ling Liang Church E Wun Secondary School (靈糧堂怡文中學)

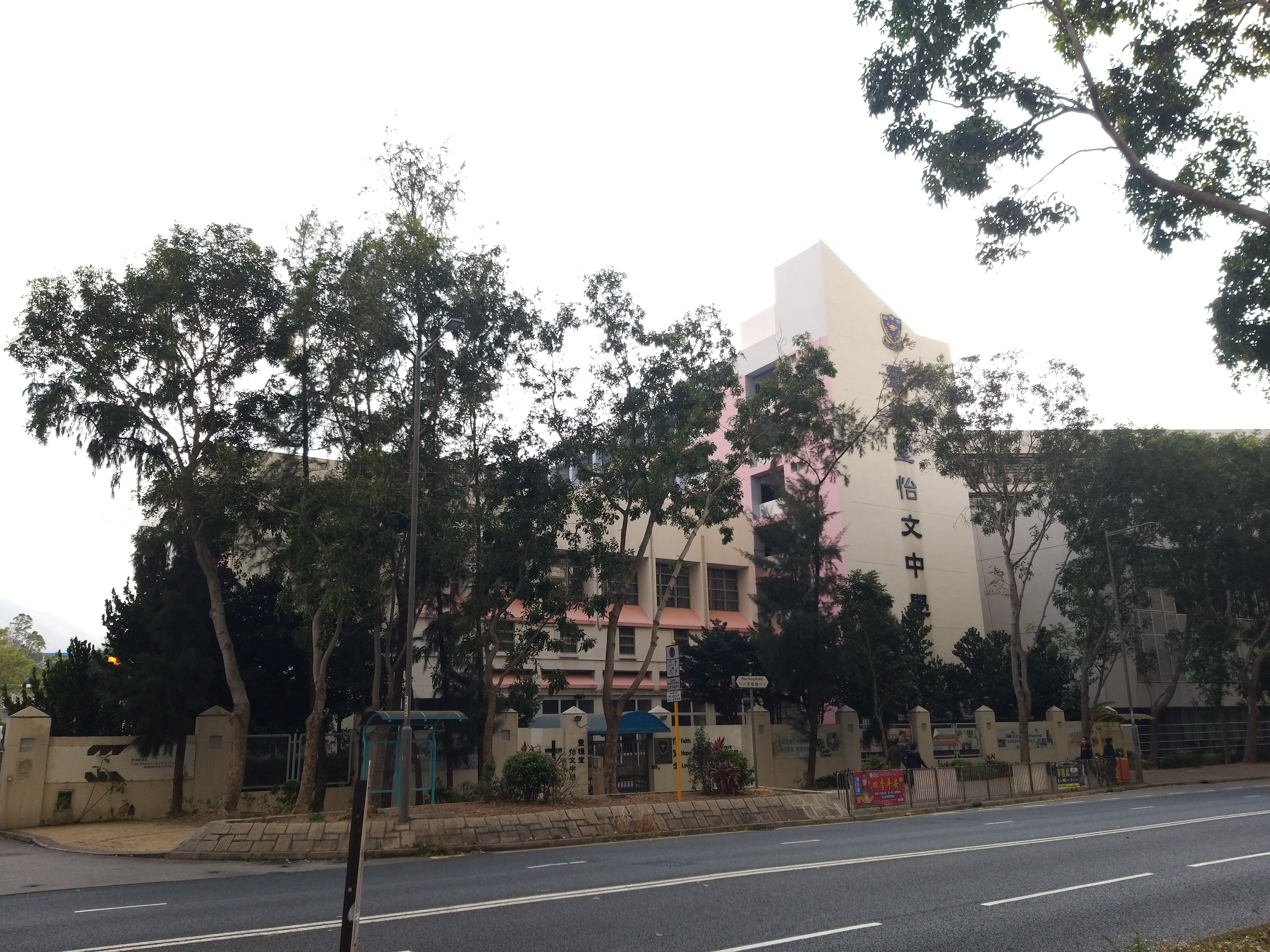
- Ling Liang Church E Wun Secondary School

Location
- 37 Man Tung Road; Tung Chung, Hong Kong; China

Information
- Motto: Faith, Hope, Love
- Established: 2002; 24 years ago
- Principal: Ip June Kit
- Enrollment: ~1000
- Website: web.llcew.edu.hk

Ling Liang Church E Wun Secondary School (靈糧堂怡文中學) is a co-educational Chinese-language aided high school located in Tung Chung, Islands District, Hong Kong. It was founded in 2002, and is operated by the Ling Liang World-wide Evangelistic Mission (Ling Liang Church) of Hong Kong.

== School organisation ==
The chairman of the School Management Committee is Ms. Tsang Ngar Yee and the principal is Mr.Ip June Kit.

The school motto is Faith, Hope, Love.

== Academics ==
Ling Liang Church E Wun is one of four high schools participating in the Hong Kong New Literacies Project.

== Awards ==
Fidelity Winners 2011: Hong Kong Schools - Year One Winners.
