= Shek Mun Kap =

Coordinates: 22.26902°N 113.93167°E

- Village
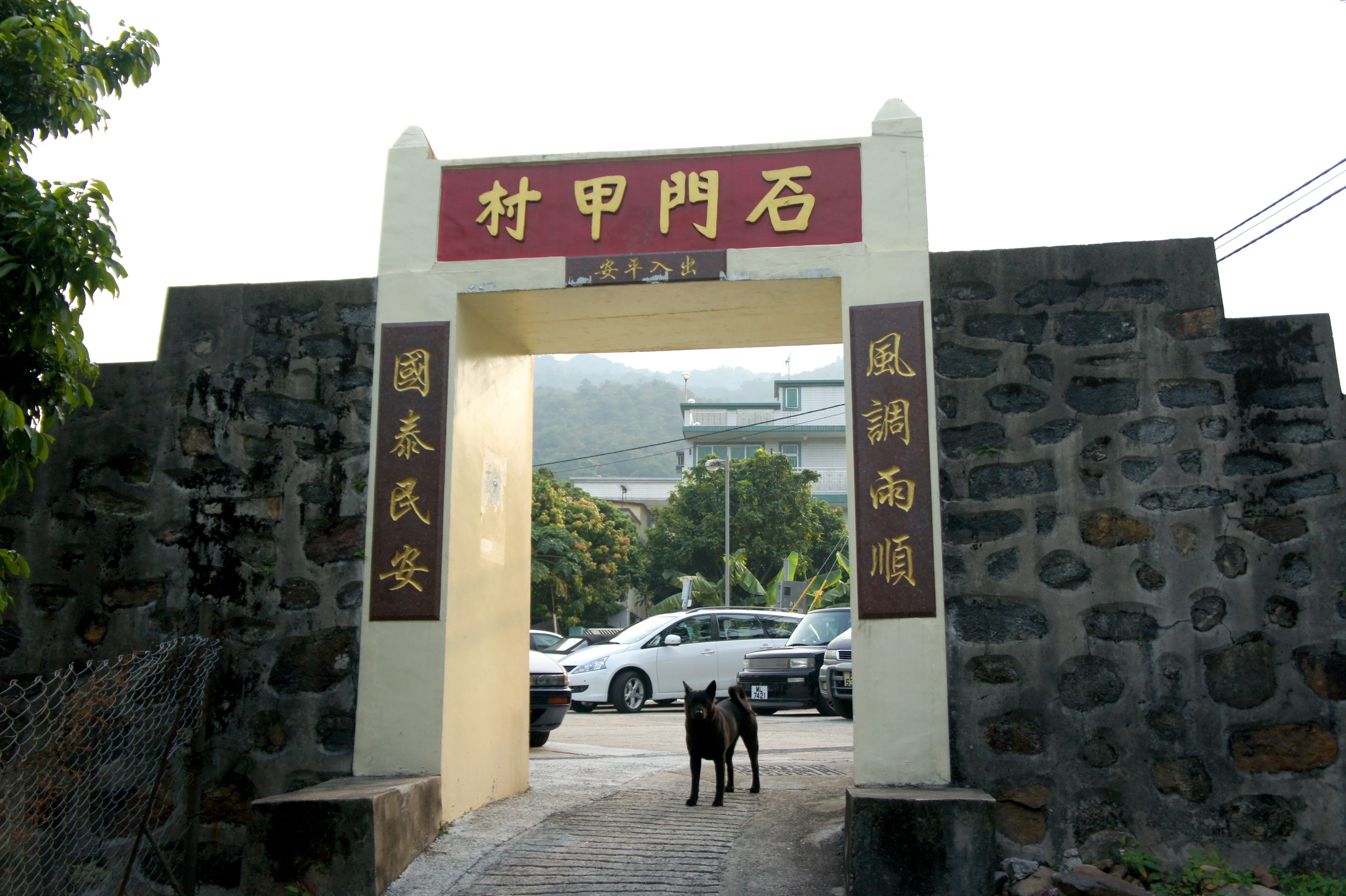
- Entrance gate of Shek Mun Kap
- Interactive map of Shek Mun Kap

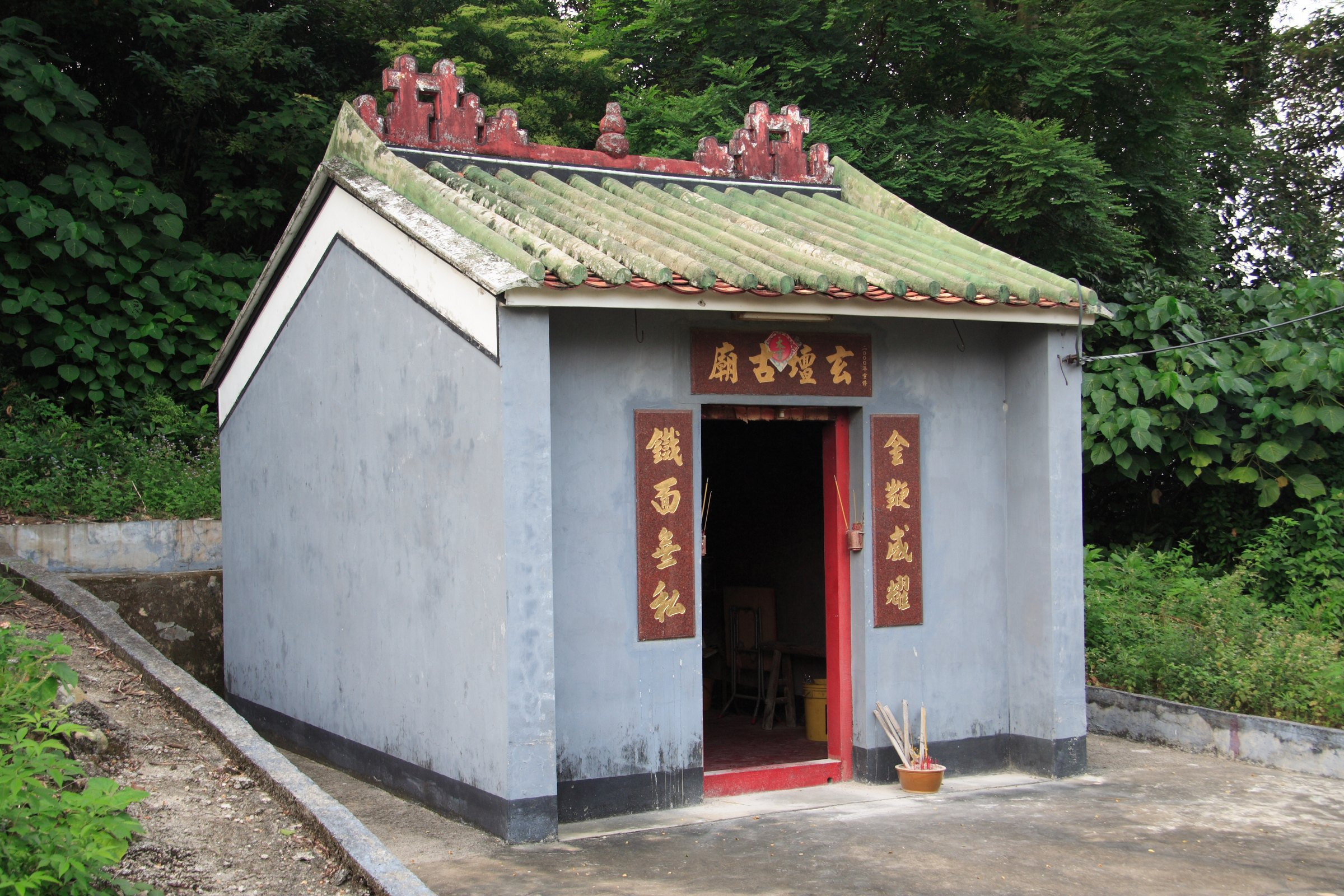
Yuen Tan Temple (玄壇古廟) in Shek Mun Kap.

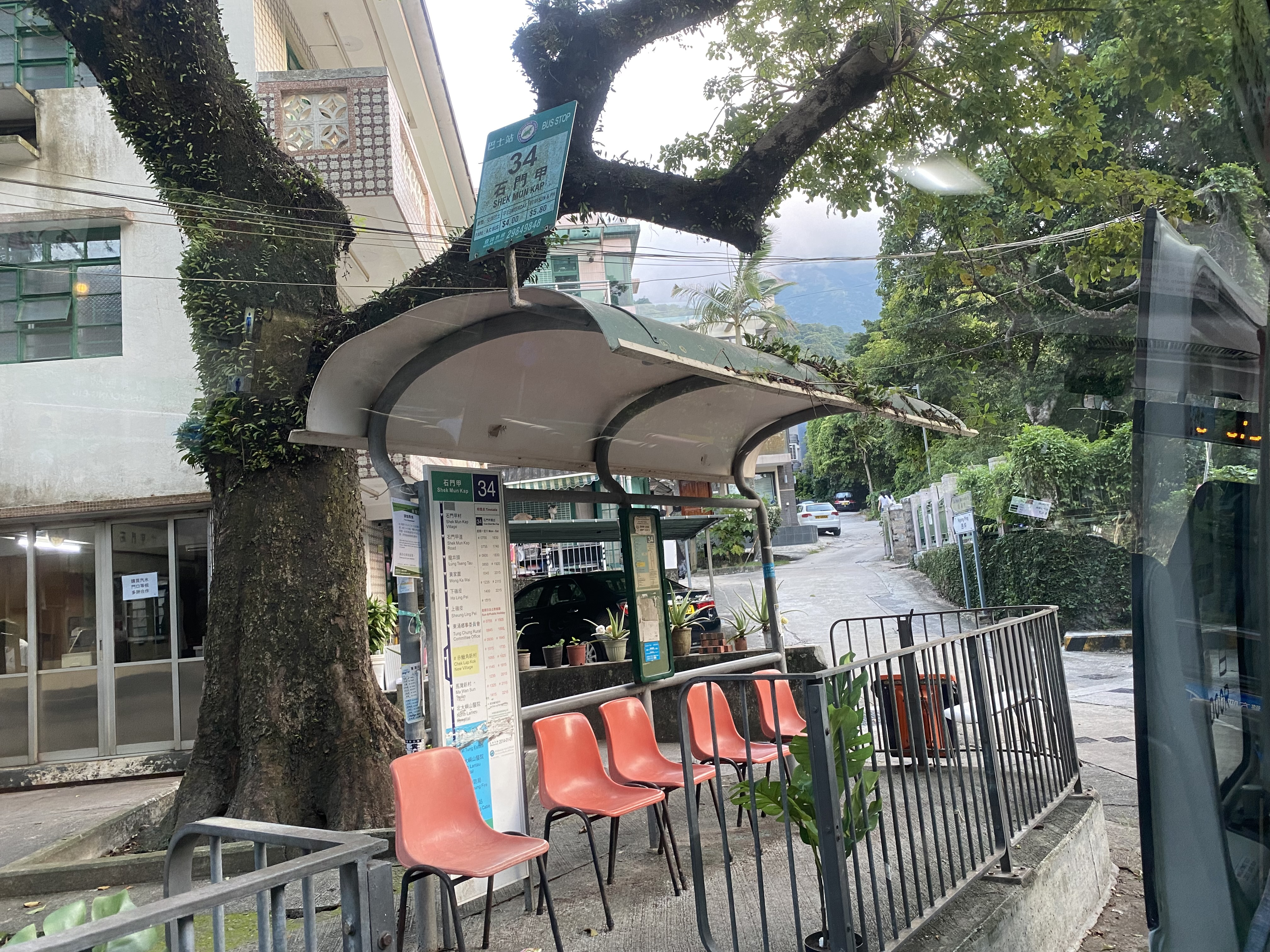
Bus stop in Shek Mun Kap.

Shek Mun Kap (Chinese: 石門甲) is a village in the Tung Chung area of Lantau Island, Hong Kong.

== Administration ==
Shek Mun Kap is a recognized village under the New Territories Small House Policy.
