= Taipo River (disambiguation) =

Taipo River may refer to:

- Taipō River (Buller District), New Zealand
- Taipo River, New Zealand

== See also ==
- Taipā River, New Zealand
- Tai Po River, Hong Kong
