= Tung Chung Catholic School =

Coordinates: 22.2829°N 113.9357°E

Tung Chung Catholic School 東涌天主教學校
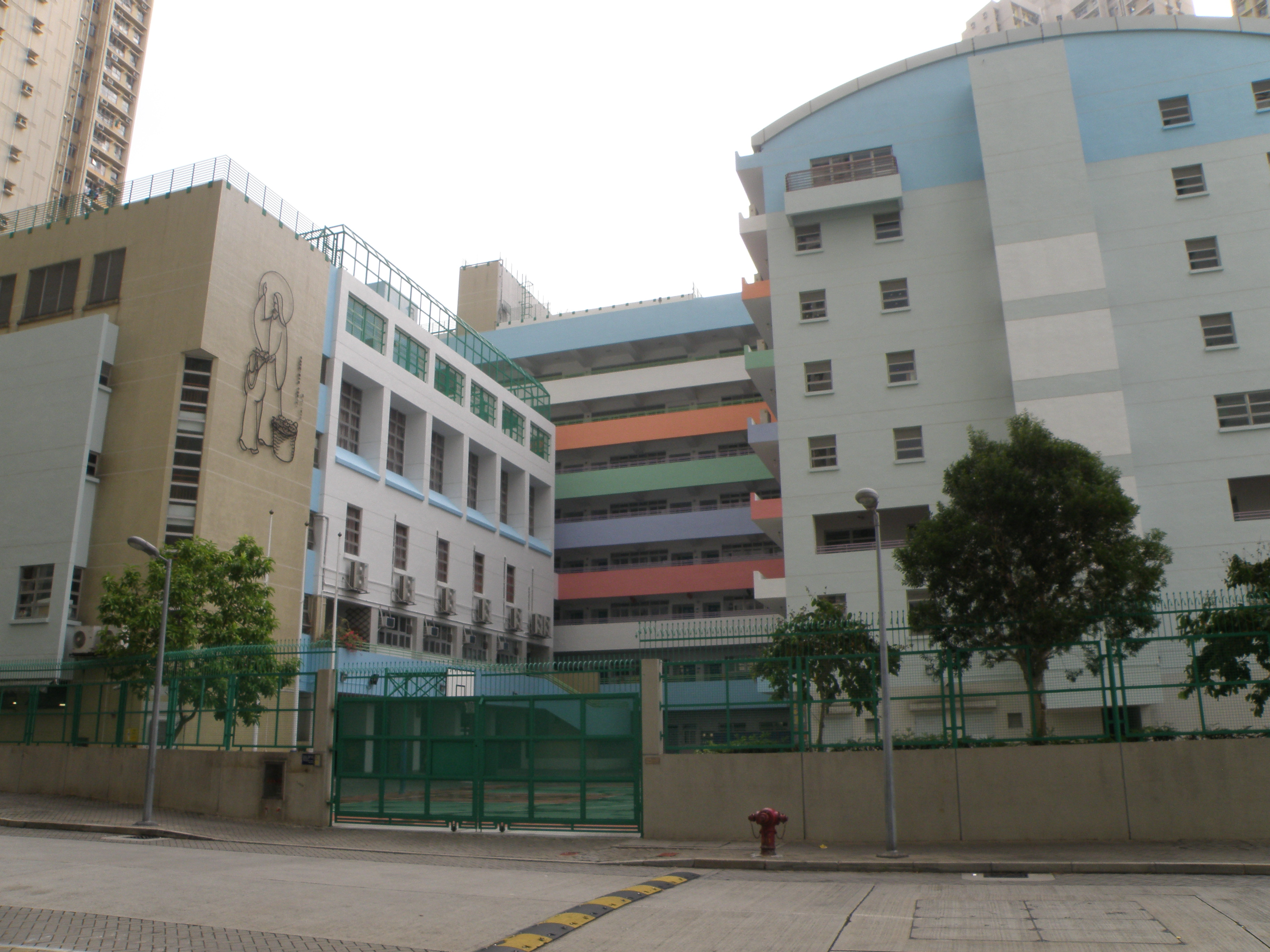

Information
- Motto: 立 己 愛 人 (Self-Help and Love)
- Religious affiliation: Roman Catholic
- Established: 2000
- Superintendent: Yeung Mei Hay (May)
- Principal: Chan Pui Shan (elementary school) Lam Chi-kong (secondary school)
- Teaching staff: 143 (primary and middle) 81 (secondary)
- Enrollment: 1686 (primary and middle schools combined)

Tung Chung Catholic School is a co-educational Chinese school located at Yat Tung, Hong Kong. The school offers primary and secondary education.

== History ==
The school opened in 2000. There are currently 1686 pupils in the primary and middle schools, taught by 143 teachers. There are an additional 81 teachers in the secondary school.

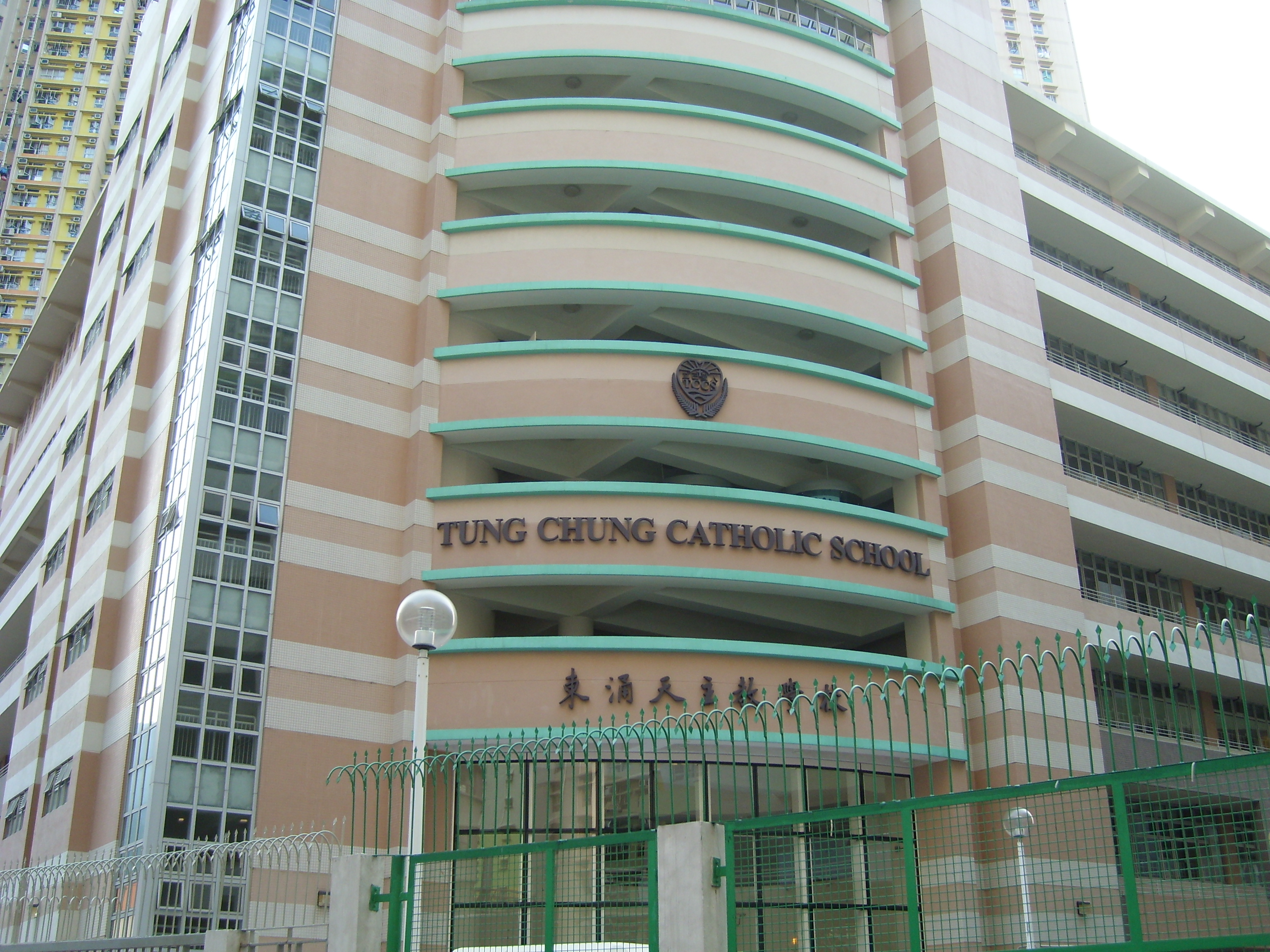
Tung Chung Catholic School
