= Nei Lak Shan =

Mountain in Hong Kong

- 彌勒山
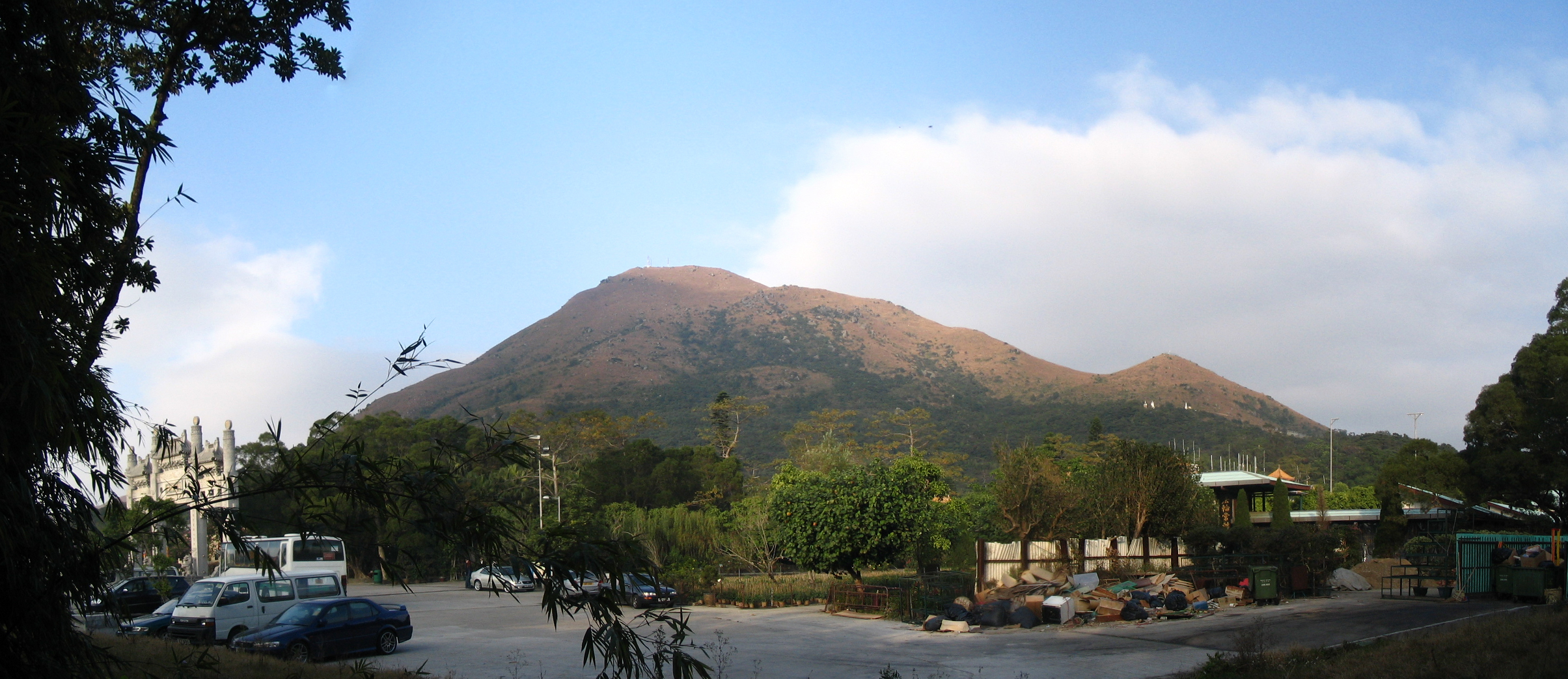
- View of Nei Lak Shan from Po Lin Monastery Paifang's Parking lot.

Highest point
- Elevation: 751 m (2,464 ft)
- Coordinates: 22°15′47″N 113°54′40″E

Geography
- Location within Hong Kong
- Location: Southern Lantau Island, Hong Kong

Nei Lak Shan
- Traditional Chinese: 彌勒山
Transcriptions
Yue: Cantonese
- Yale Romanization: Mèih lahk sāan
- Jyutping: Mei4 lak6 saan1

Nei Lak Shan (Chinese: 彌勒山) is the eighth highest mountain in Hong Kong. With a height of 751 m (2,464 ft), it is situated on Lantau Island immediately north of Ngong Ping where the Buddhist Po Lin Monastery is located.

An angle station of the Ngong Ping 360 cable car is located near Nei Lak Shan.

== Name ==
The Cantonese name Nei Lak Shan, or prescriptively Mei Lak Shan (Chinese: 彌勒山; Jyutping: Mei^{4} Lak^{6} Saan^{1}) is a translation of Maitreya, the future Buddha, in Buddhism. The mountain can therefore be loosely translated as "Buddha Mountain". It is situated close to the Tian Tan Buddha at Ngong Ping.

== See also ==
- List of mountains, peaks and hills in Hong Kong
