= Ngong Ping 360 =

Gondola lift on Lantau Island, Hong Kong

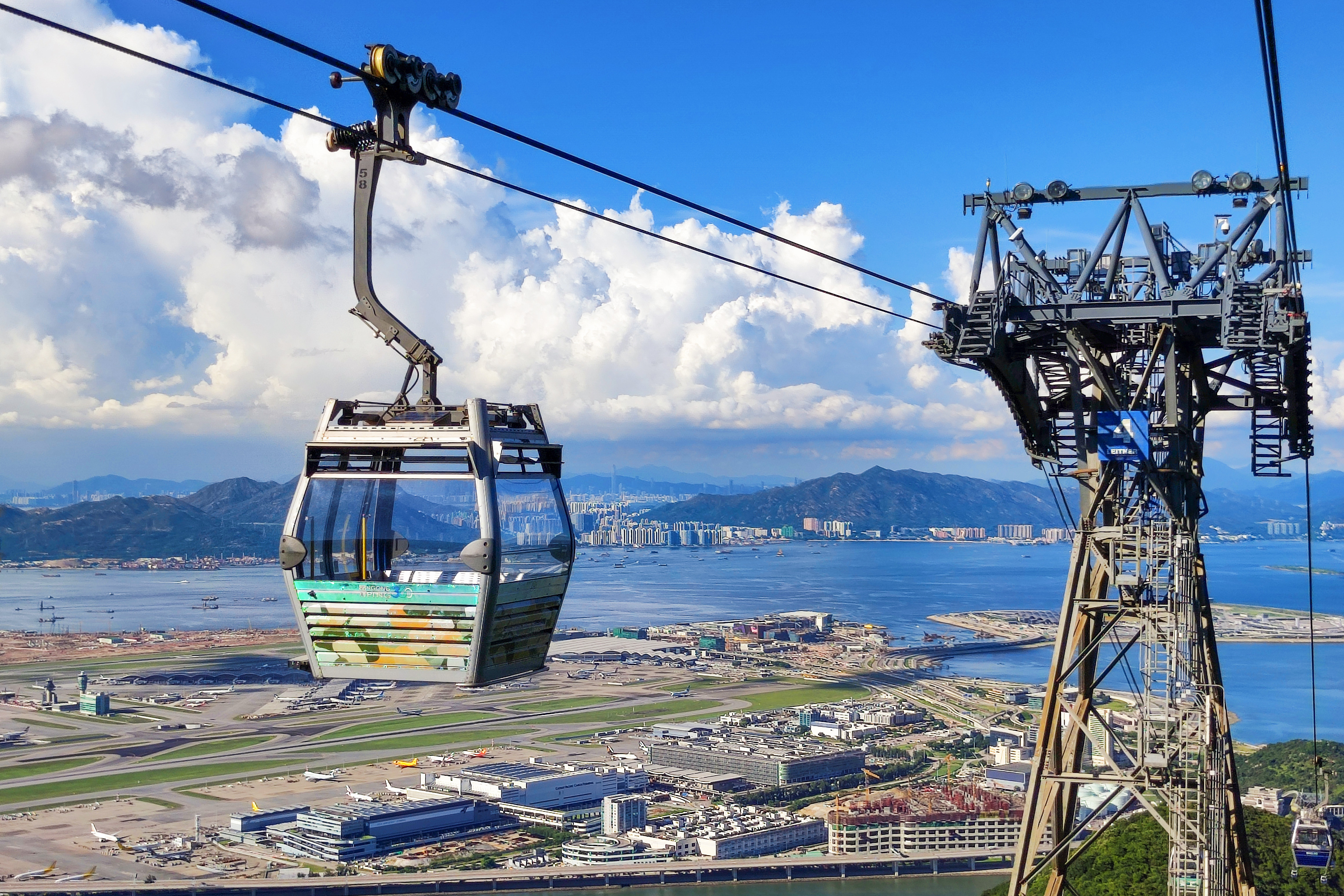
- Interactive map of Ngong Ping 360

Overview
- Status: Operational
- System: Bicable gondola detachable
- Location: Lantau Island, Hong Kong
- Termini: Ngong Ping; Tung Chung
- No. of stations: 2
- Open: 18 September 2006; 20 years ago
- Website: np360.com.hk/en/

Operation
- Operator: MTR Corporation
- Carrier capacity: 109 cabins, maximum of 17 adult passengers per cabin, 3500 passengers per hour either way
- Trip duration: 25 min

Technical features
- Line length: 5,700 m (18,700 ft)
- Operating speed: 6 metres per second

Ngong Ping 360
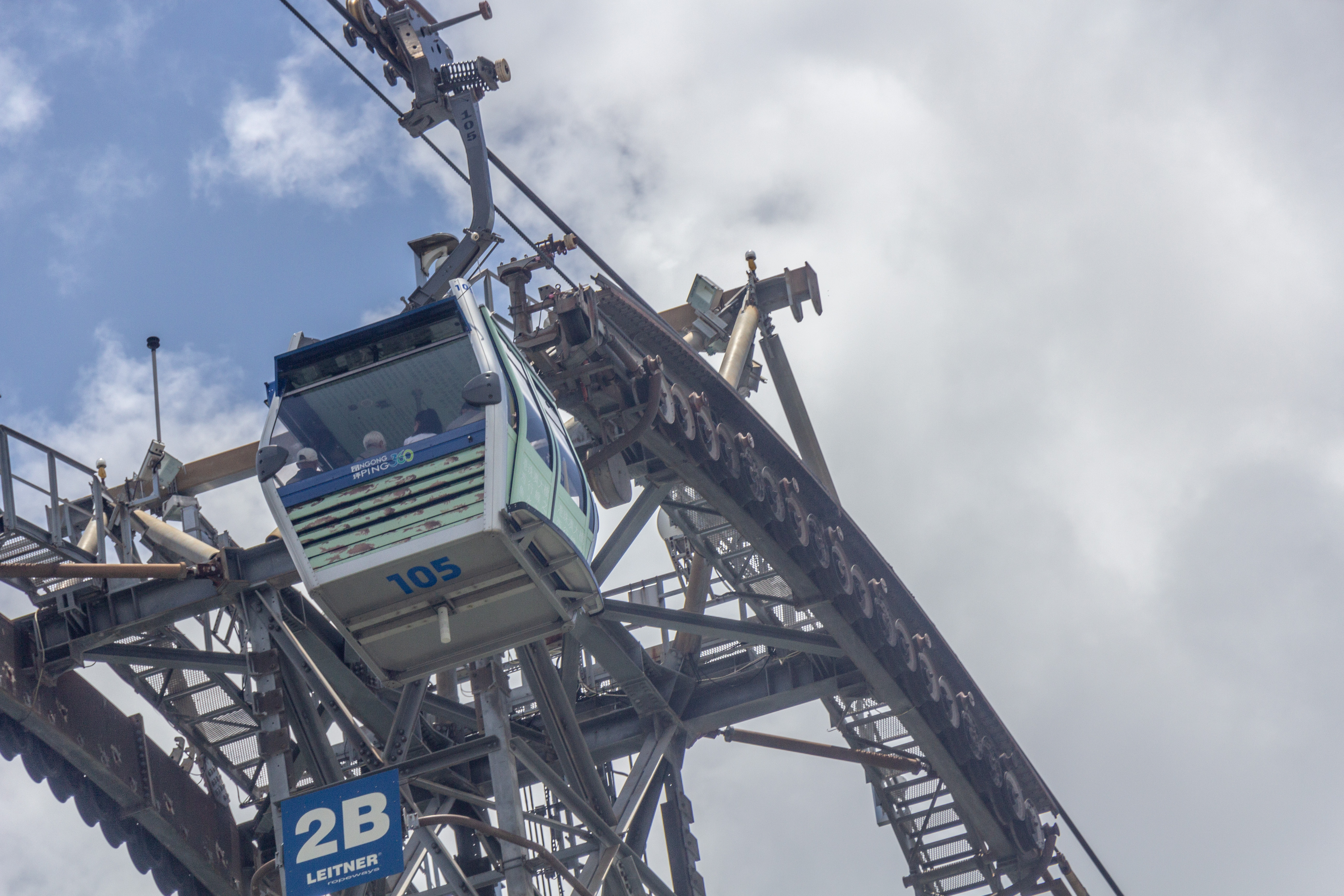
- Chinese: 昂坪360
Transcriptions
Standard Mandarin
- Hanyu Pinyin: Ángpíng Sānliùlíng
Yue: Cantonese
- Jyutping: ngong4 ping4 saam1 luk6 ling4
- IPA: [ŋɔ̏ːŋ pʰɪ̏ŋ sáːm lʊ̀k lɪ̏ŋ]

Ngong Ping 360 (Chinese: 昂坪360; Jyutping: ngong4 ping4 saam1 luk6 ling4, Cantonese) is a bicable gondola lift on Lantau Island in Hong Kong. Intended to improve tourism to the area, the aerial lift was previously known as Tung Chung Cable Car Project before acquiring the Ngong Ping 360 brand in April 2005. It consists of the Ngong Ping Cable Car, formerly known as the Ngong Ping 360 Skyrail, and the Ngong Ping Village, a retail and entertainment centre adjacent to the cable car's upper station. Ngong Ping 360 connects Tung Chung, on the north coast of Lantau and itself linked to central Hong Kong by the Tung Chung line, with the Ngong Ping area in the hills above. This is home to the Po Lin Monastery and the Tian Tan Buddha, both already significant tourist attractions in their own right. Before Ngong Ping 360's opening, the only access was via a mountain road and bus service.

Ngong Ping 360 is owned by the MTR Corporation, the operator of Hong Kong's rail system. It was built by Leitner Ropeways and was originally operated by Skyrail-ITM. Skyrail-ITM was removed from the project after an investigation following an incident in June 2007. It is now operated by a directly owned subsidiary of the MTR Corporation.

== History ==
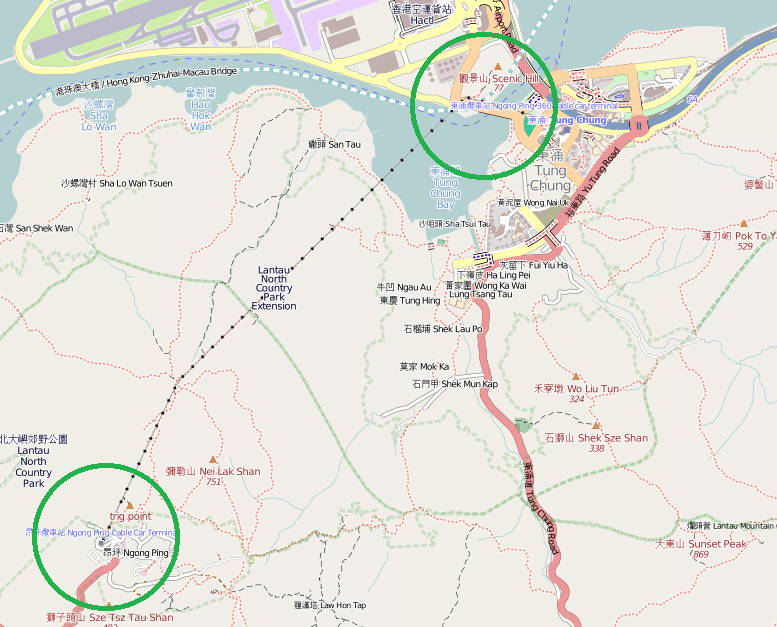
Map of the Ngong Ping 360 system. The terminals are shown with the green circles

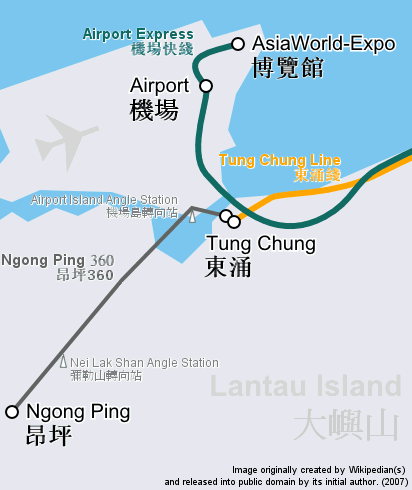
Map of the Ngong Ping 360 system, with the MTR's Tung Chung line and Airport Express partially shown

=== Conception ===
Following a feasibility study, the Hong Kong government issued an invitation in 2000 for detailed proposals and tender for a 30-year franchise on a Build-Operate-Transfer basis for the global project of operation, management and maintenance of a cable car system linking Tung Chung and Ngong Ping on Lantau Island. The Tourism Commission declared the objective of the project was to increase the range of attractions to visitors to enhance Hong Kong's position as a leading tourist destination in the region. Target timing was to identify a successful proponent by the end of 2001 and to commence operation of the cable car system before early 2006.

=== Construction and opening ===
Construction of the cable car project started at the beginning of 2004. The system was originally scheduled to open on 23 January 2006, but on 17 June 2006, during the trial-run with the maximum of 109 gondola cabins on the cables, a cabin arriving at Ngong Ping station had a slight collision with a late departing cabin. The entire system was automatically halted by the safety system, leaving 500 volunteers trapped for two hours. As a result, Skyrail-ITM postponed the opening day to fix the technical problems, tests and emergency staff drills.

After two months of improvement works and repair for the damages made by Typhoon Prapiroon in August 2006, Ngong Ping 360 resumed a trial-run of 7 days from 30 August 2006. The project director at MTR Corp and senior executives of Skyrail were at the soft opening of the facility on 18 September. In keeping with feng shui traditions, Skyrail-ITM sold just 1,688 tickets for the maiden day's run on 18 September at HK$88 each, the numbers being considered lucky. Henry Tang officiated at the grand opening of the attraction on 9 November 2006.

=== Operation ===
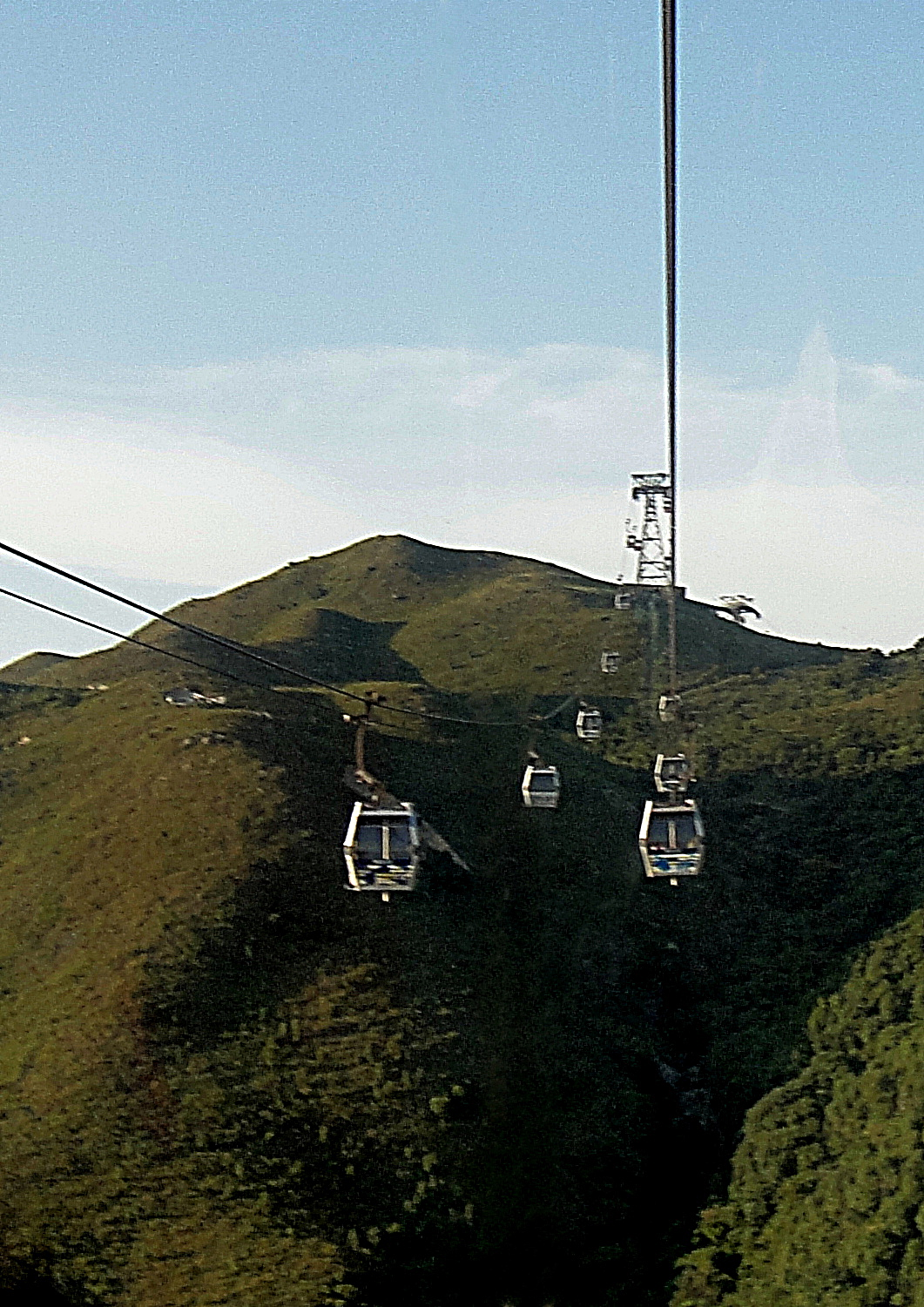
Ngong Ping 360 cable car riding through the peak

After the commencement of service, system failures still occurred occasionally. Between its opening on 18 September and 27 October, eight service suspensions were recorded, prompting a legislative panel to challenge the operator's continued operation.

A serious incident occurred on 11 June 2007, during a brake test which was part of the annual examination of the cable, when an empty cabin fell off the cable and crashed into a hilly area near Chek Lap Kok South Road. Despite the fact that there were no injuries caused, an investigation resulted in the operating company and its CEO being charged with criminal negligence related to the incident, although the CEO's case was later delayed, and the charges against him eventually dropped altogether. Skyrail-ITM was removed as operator, fined HK$5,000, and the MTR Corporation took over operational responsibility. The line remained out of service until 23 December when it underwent one week of trial run involving 40,000 visitors riding for free. It reopened officially on 31 December 2007.

In April 2009, the company introduced its premium rate Crystal Cabin service, using glass-bottom cabins.

On 25 January 2012, Ngong Ping 360 was hit by a technical fault which was caused by a pulley which wasn't running smoothly, causing the automated system to grind to a halt. Passengers who had been stranded were later evacuated by resuming the operation with reduced speed.

== Ngong Ping Cable Car/Stations ==
Ngong Ping Cable Car is a 5.7-kilometre (3.5 mi) long bi-cable gondola lift system (referred to by its operators as a "cable car") linking between Tung Chung (where it connects the MTR Tung Chung station) and Ngong Ping (where the Po Lin Monastery and Tian Tan Buddha are located). Between the two terminals at Tung Chung (Tung Chung Terminal) and Ngong Ping, the lift system runs across the southern shore of the Hong Kong International Airport island and Nei Lak Shan, with eight towers including the stations. Five of the towers are located within the country park.

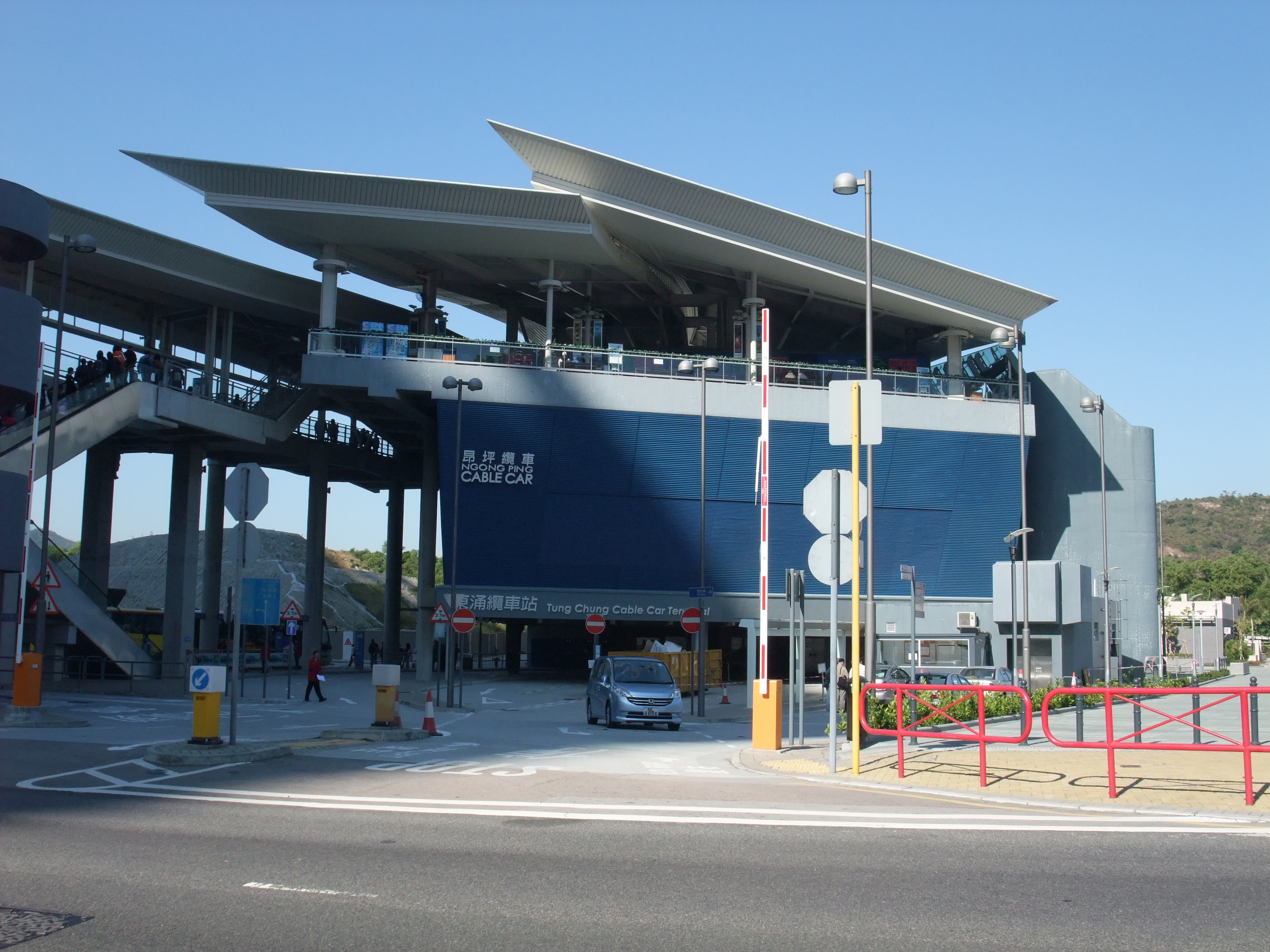
Tung Chung Terminal

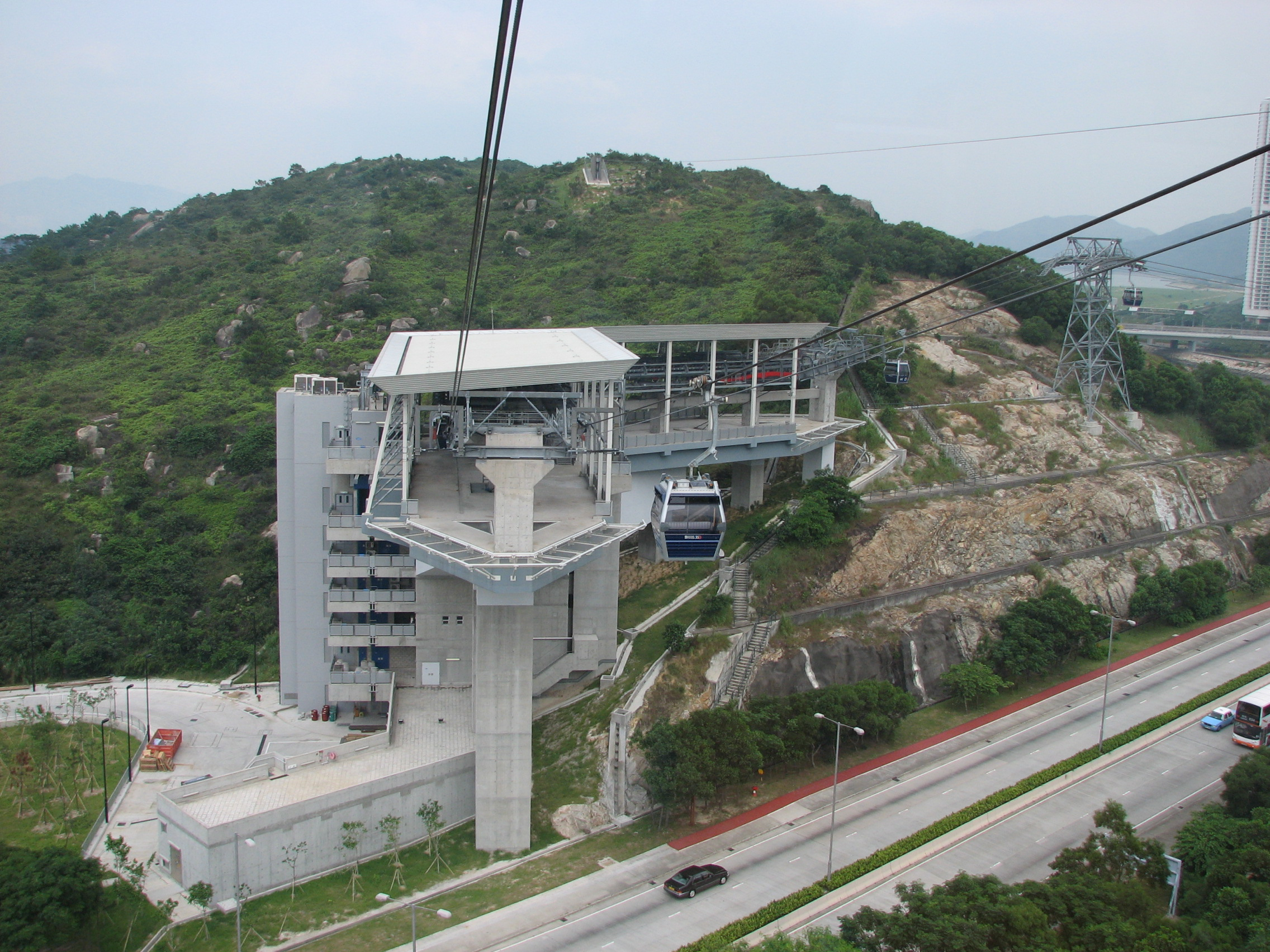
Airport Island Angle Station

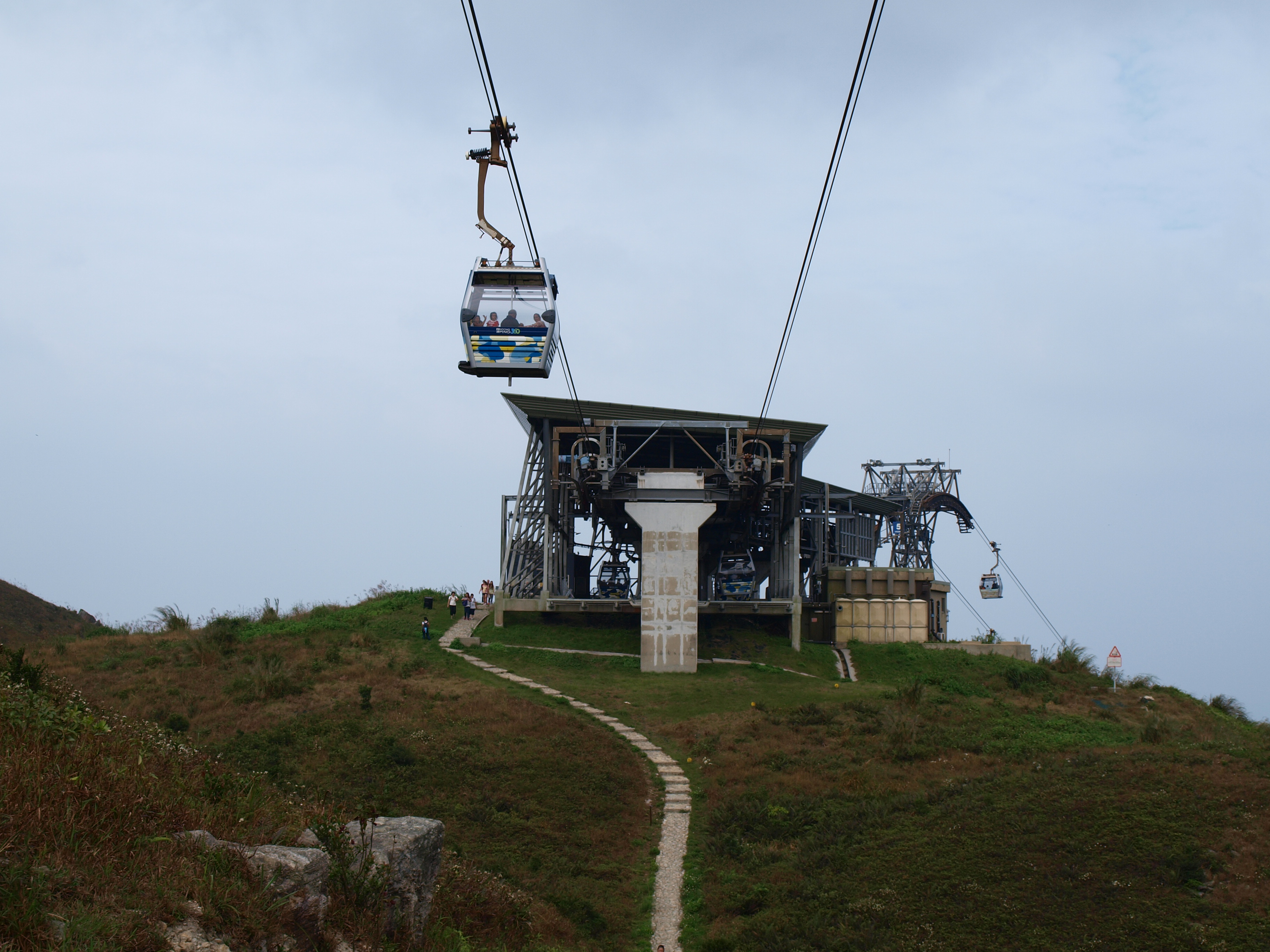
Nei Lak Shan Angle Station

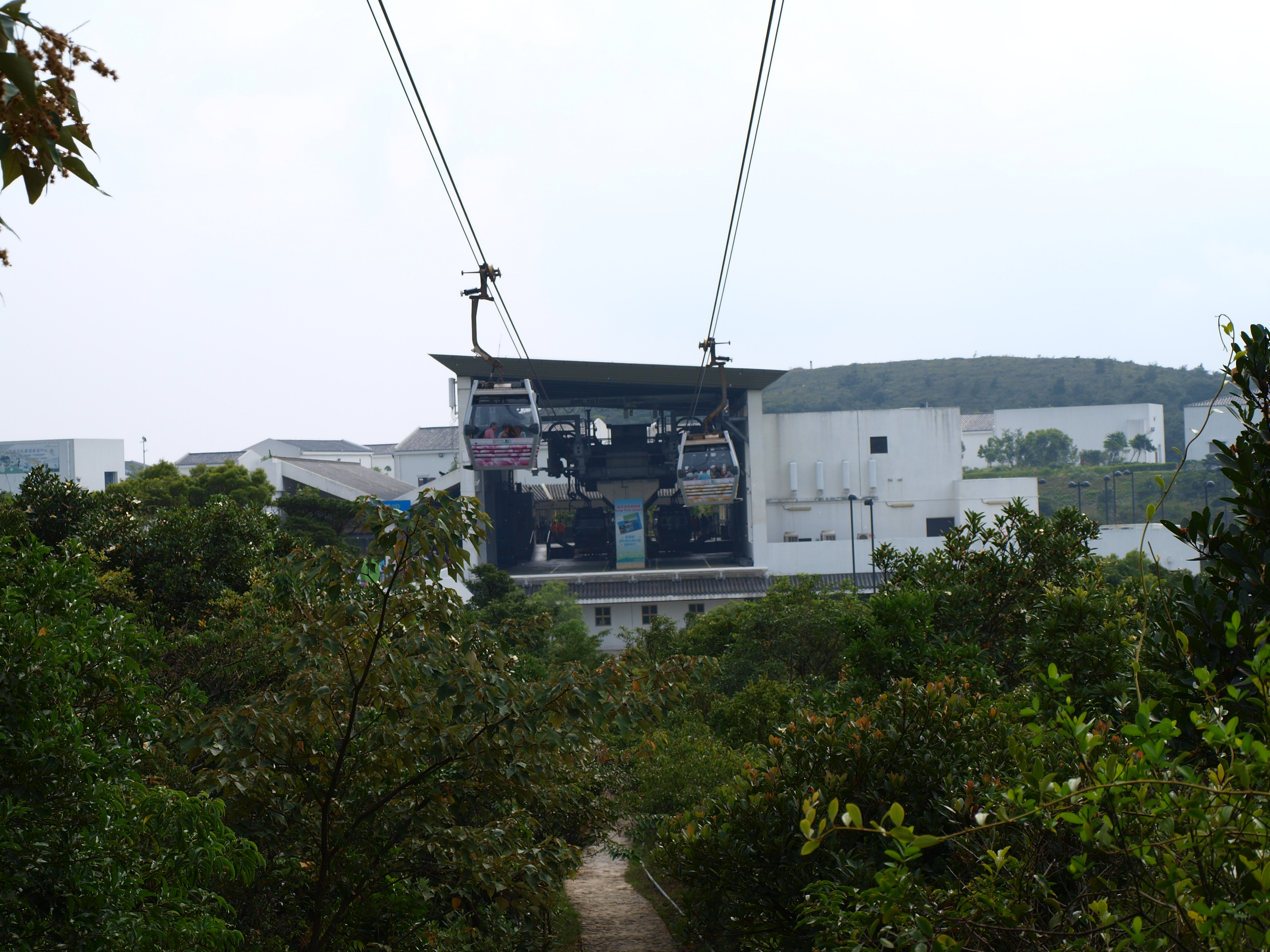
Ngong Ping Terminal

=== Stations ===
Livery and Name	District	Connections	Date Opened
Ngong Ping 360
Tung Chung	Islands	Tung Chung station for Tung Chung line	18 September 2006
Ngong Ping	Islands		18 September 2006

The cable car journey offers a 25-minute aerial alternative to the current one-hour journey by Tung Chung Road, allowing visitors to glide across Tung Chung Bay and up to Lantau Island towards Ngong Ping Plateau.

The cableway starts at the Tung Chung Terminal, runs across Tung Chung Bay to Airport Island Angle Station on Chek Lap Kok, where it turns through about 60 degrees before returning across Tung Chung Bay. It then runs up the Lantau North Country Park to another angle station near Nei Lak Shan (Nei Lak Shan Angle Station), before finally descending to the Ngong Ping Terminal.

During the 25-minute journey, travellers can see panoramic views over the North Lantau Country Park, the South China Sea, Hong Kong International Airport, the Tung Chung valley, Ngong Ping Plateau and surrounding terrain and waterways. As visitors approach Ngong Ping, they can see The Big Buddha and the Po Lin Monastery.

=== Design ===
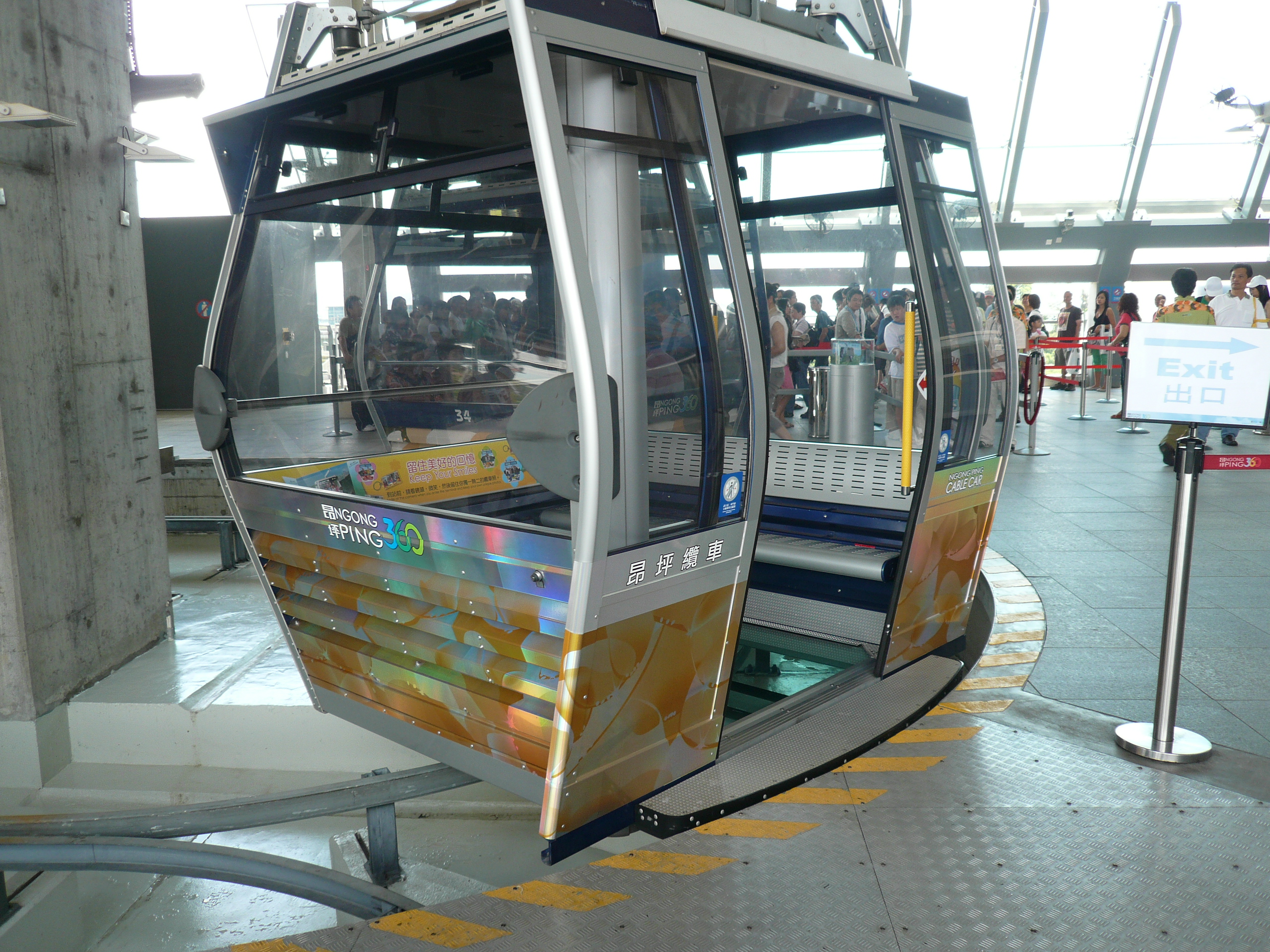
A Ngong Ping 360 "Crystal Cabin". The Crystal Cabin features a glass bottom floor.

Designed by Aedas, also the architect of the project, the line uses a continuous circulating twin cable aerial ropeway system, technically described as a bicable gondola lift. The Leitner Group was the contractor for the cable car system. Between the Tung Chung and Ngong Ping Terminals, the 5.7 km cableway changes direction twice at the two angle stations, one on the south shore of Chek Lap Kok; the other west of Nei Lak Shan within the Lantau North Country Park. Whilst the gondola cabins are temporarily detached from the cables at each angle station, there are no passenger loading or unloading facilities at these points.

The cableway is supported by 8 towers. The cabin has a modern design with seating for 10 and standing room for another 7. It also incorporates features to meet the needs of disabled passengers, including elderly and wheelchair users. The system has a capacity of 3,500 people per hour in each direction.

The cableway and the cabins come from the Leitner Group. A continuous circulating bi-cable aerial ropeway system, where the track cable acts as a rail in the sky and the haul cable pulls the cabins, allows long spans between towers. It is the first of its type to be installed in Hong Kong. Martin Leitner, chief sales officer of Leitner, explained that the cable car system used in Hong Kong is much heavier and bigger than that used in Austria. He said the steel columns used to support the system have to be stronger, and thus more expensive.

The cable car line offers two levels of service based on different cabin designs, branded Standard Cabins and Crystal Cabins. The Crystal Cabins are distinguished by their glass bottoms, and are charged at a premium rate. Both sets of cabins circulate on the same cable, with passengers being segregated by queuing systems at both terminals.

== Ngong Ping Village ==
The Ngong Ping Village, built next to the Ngong Ping Cable Car Terminal, occupies a 15,000-square-metre (160,000 sq ft) site and has been designed to mirror and uphold the cultural and spiritual veracity of the Ngong Ping area. Traditional Chinese architectural designs are a feature of the Ngong Ping Village, which contains an assortment of shopping and dining experiences, on top of a number of key attractions including Walking with Buddha, the Monkey's Tale Theatre and the Ngong Ping Tea House. Chinese New Year, Christmas and the three days of Buddha's birthday are among the most crowded days.

Ngong Ping Village's international cable car gallery has cable car replicas from various countries including China, Switzerland, Italy, Brazil, Austria, France, Italy, Germany etc.

== Awards ==
- 2007 – Enterprise Environmental Protection Achievement Award – Outstanding Awards by Hong Kong Environmental Protection Association
- 2007 – Gold Wastewi$e Logo by HKSAR Environmental Protection Department in 2007
