= Tung Chung station =

MTR station in the New Territories, Hong Kong

Tung Chung 東涌
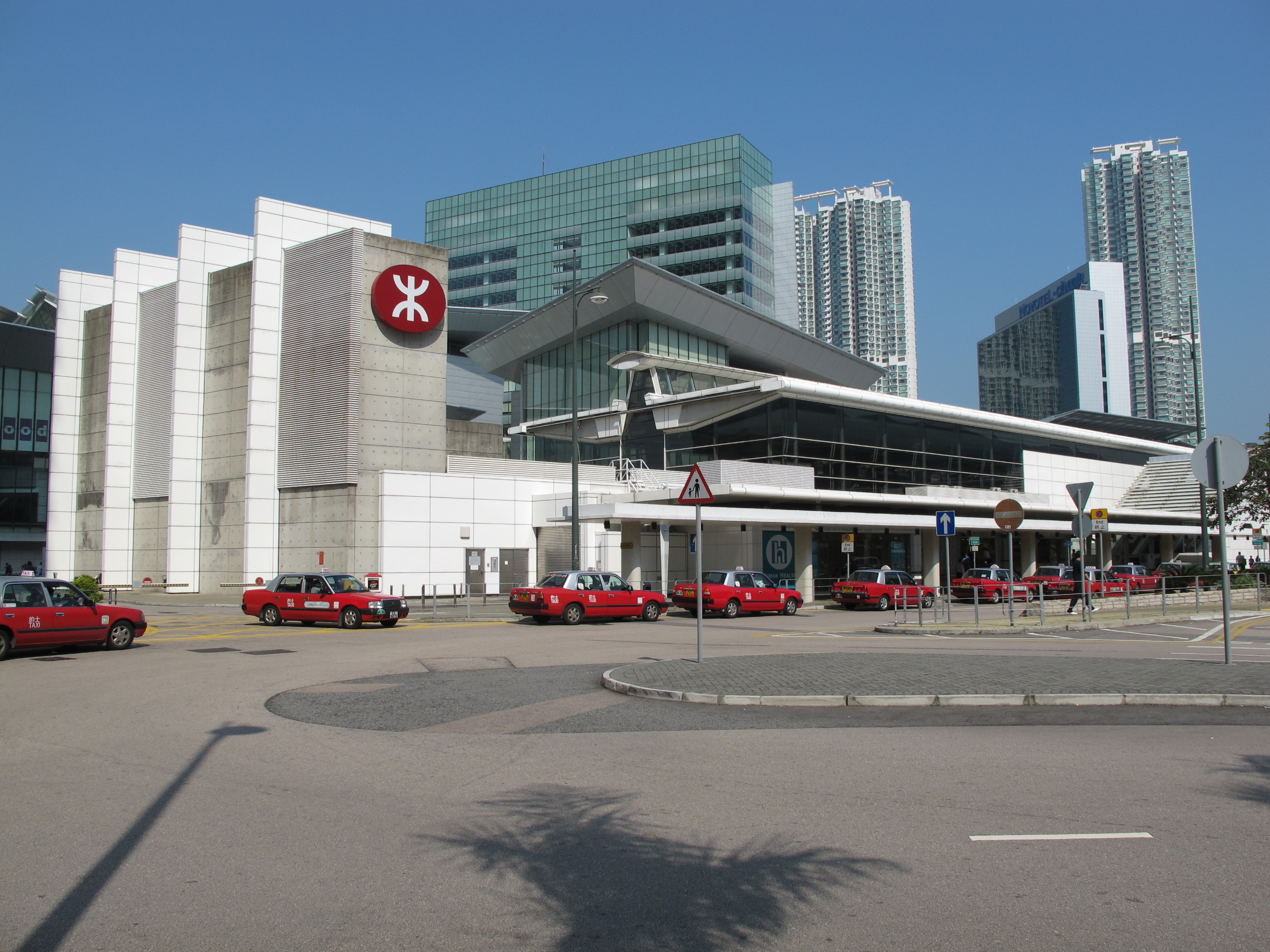
- Station exterior

Chinese name
- Traditional Chinese: 東涌
- Cantonese Yale: Dūngchūng
- Literal meaning: East Stream
Transcriptions
Standard Mandarin
- Hanyu Pinyin: Dōngchōng
Yue: Cantonese
- Yale Romanization: Dūngchūng
- Jyutping: Dung1cung1

General information
- Location: Cheung Tung Road × Tat Tung Road, Tung Chung, Lantau Island; Islands District, Hong Kong
- Coordinates: 22°17′21″N 113°56′30″E
- System: MTR rapid transit station
- Owner: MTR Corporation
- Operator: MTR Corporation
- Line: Tung Chung line
- Platforms: 2 (1 island platform)
- Tracks: 2
- Connections: Bus; Ngong Ping 360; Taxi

Construction
- Structure type: Underground
- Platform levels: 1
- Accessible: Yes
- Architect: Rocco Design Architects

Other information
- Station code: TUC

History
- Opened: 22 June 1998; 28 years ago
- Electrified: 1,500 V DC (Overhead line)

Services
Preceding station	MTR	Following station
Sunny Bay towards Hong Kong	Tung Chung line	Terminus
Terminus	Ngong Ping 360	Ngong Ping Terminal Terminus
Proposed services
Preceding station	MTR	Following station
Tung Chung East towards Hong Kong	Tung Chung line Tung Chung line extension	Tung Chung West Terminus
Track layout
Location
- Location within MTR

Tung Chung (Chinese: 東涌) is a station on the Tung Chung line of the MTR rapid transport system in Hong Kong. As the western termini of the Tung Chung line, it is also a transfer point of those wishing to use the Ngong Ping Cable Car and by bus to travel to the rest of Lantau Island. As with all other MTR stations, Tung Chung has a unique colour scheme used throughout the station, in this case lavender.

Given that the Tung Chung line and the Airport Express run largely parallel and share much trackage, and that most stations on Tung Chung line are interchange stations, Tung Chung is only one of two stations on the Tung Chung line not served by other lines, the other being Olympic.

It is one of the only 3 MTR stations on Lantau Island, along with Sunny Bay and Disneyland Resort.

== Location ==
Tung Chung station is located in the new town of the same name on the northern shore of Lantau Island. The surrounding area is predominantly residential, with the majority of buildings in the station's catchment area being public and private housing blocks and schools. Exit C of the station leads to an open plaza which also provides access to a bus terminus and the nearby mall Citygate Outlets.

== History ==
The contract to construct the station, valued at HK$1.1 billion, was awarded to Japanese construction company Aoki Corporation and commenced on 28 November 1994. The station was designed by Hong Kong architecture firm Rocco Design Architects and engineering company Ove Arup & Partners.

Site preparation began in early 1995. The station was officially topped out on 18 December 1996. A public open day was held on 12 June 1998.

The station opened with the rest of the new Tung Chung line on 22 June 1998. In December 2003, eight suspended sculptures were installed over the station concourse. Called Link, the artwork was designed by Hong Kong artist Freeman Lau, and alludes to the MTR's function in connecting urban dwellers to nature.

In 2029, 3 more stations will be opened on the Tung Chung Line with Tung Chung West Station being the new western termini. Tung Chung East and Siu Ho Wan will be new stations between Tung Chung and Sunny Bay Station.

== Layout ==
Both platforms share the same island platform underground. A "First Train" indicator is provided along the platform indicating to passengers which train to board.

-	footbridge	footbridge connecting Citygate Outlets with Fu Tung Estate, shops
G	concourse	entrances/exits, customer service centre, shops, vending machines, automatic teller machines, Octopus promotion machine
L2	Platform 2	Tung Chung line towards Hong Kong (Sunny Bay) →
L2	island platform, doors will open on the left or right
L2	Platform 1	Tung Chung line towards Hong Kong (Sunny Bay) →

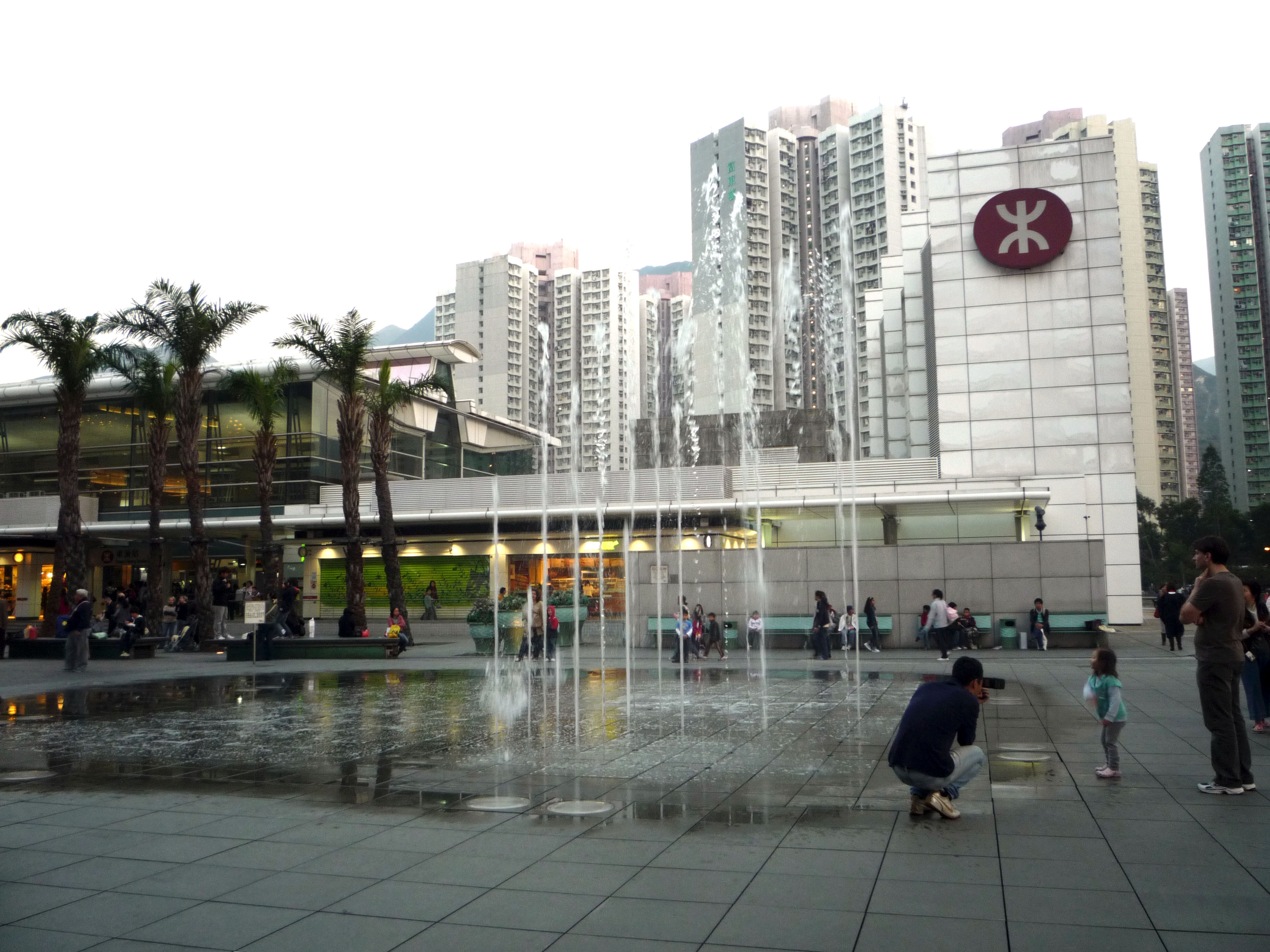
Exterior view (outside Entrance/Exit B)

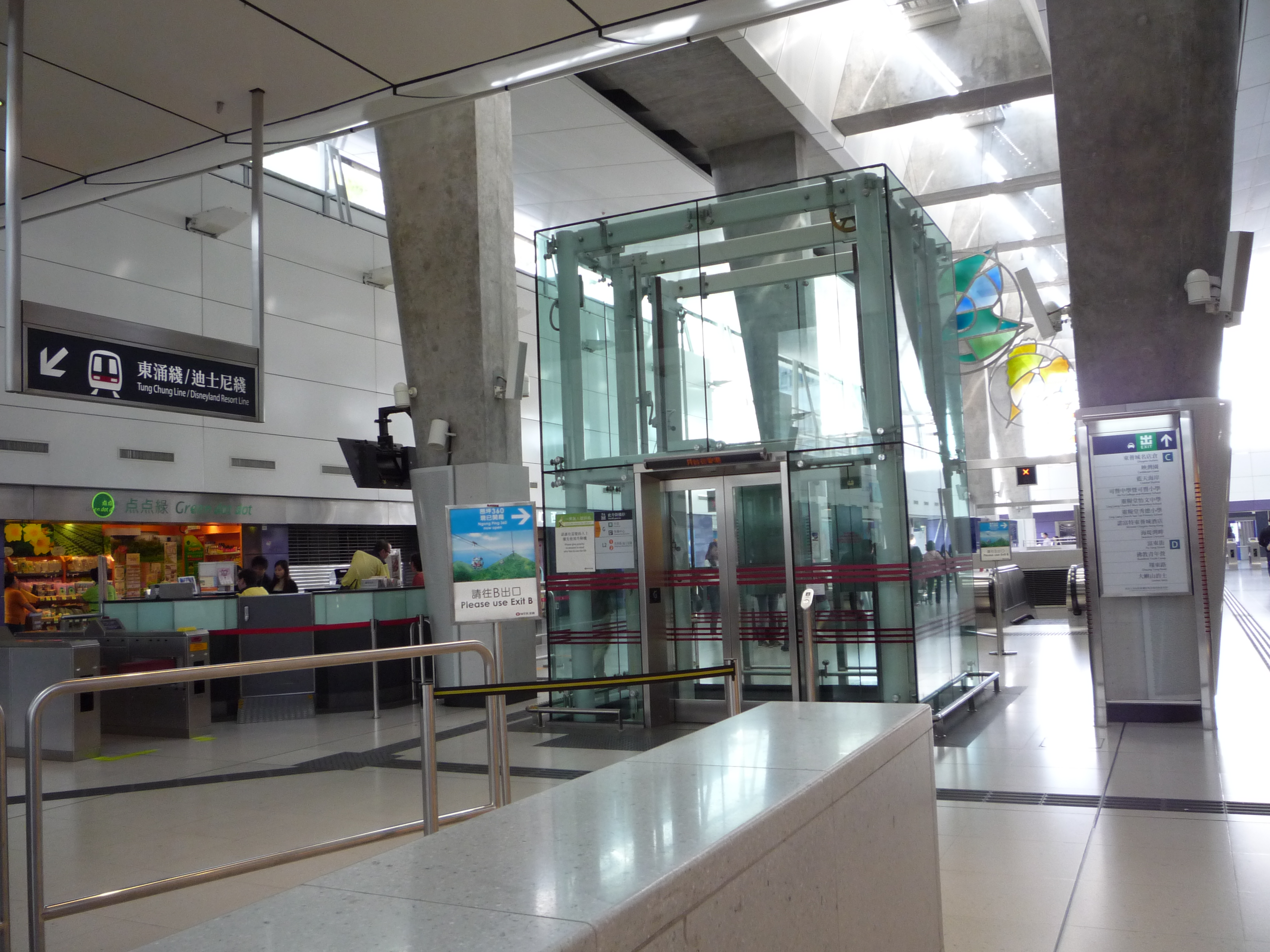
Concourse

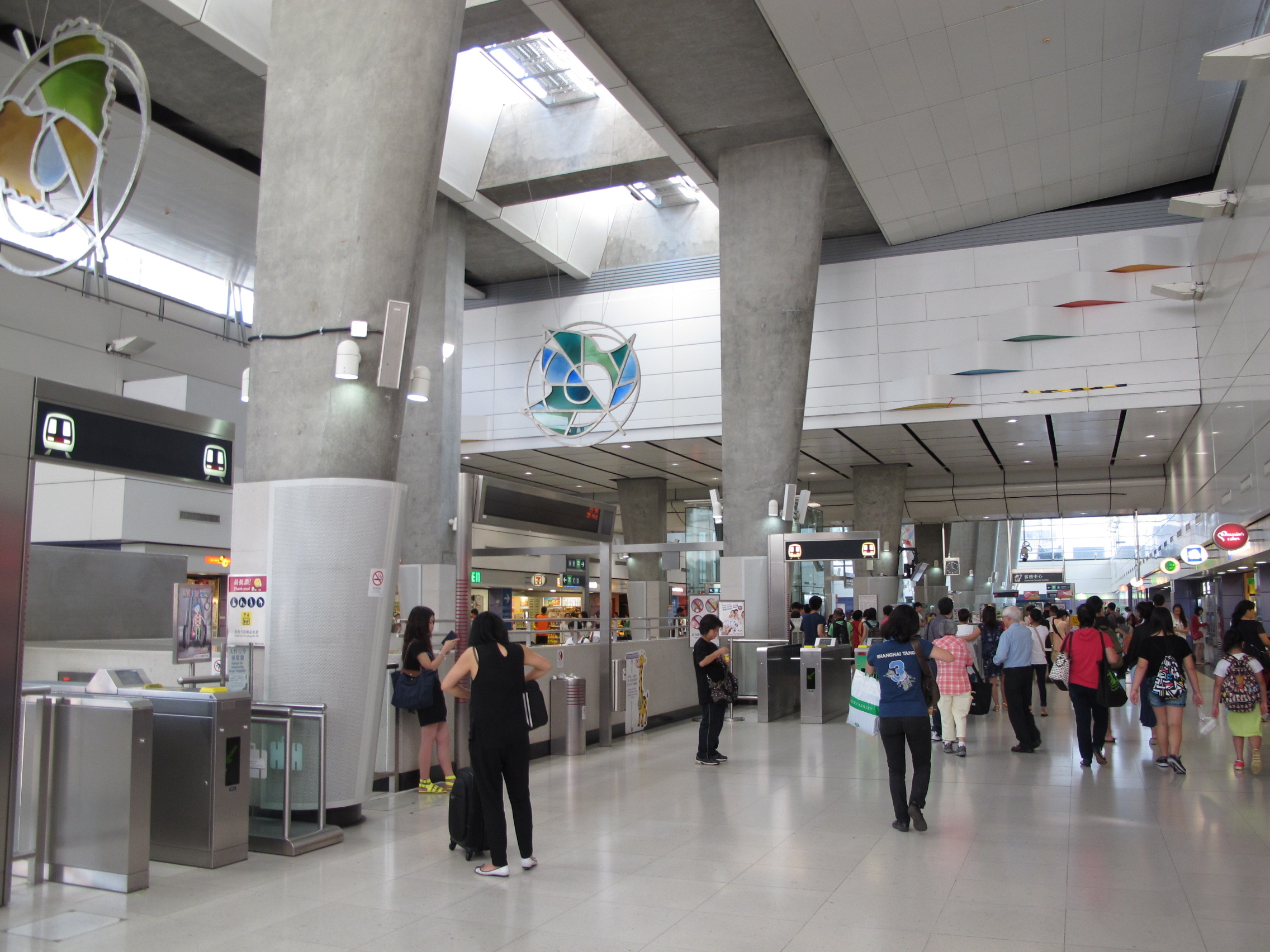
Concourse (near Entrance/Exit C)

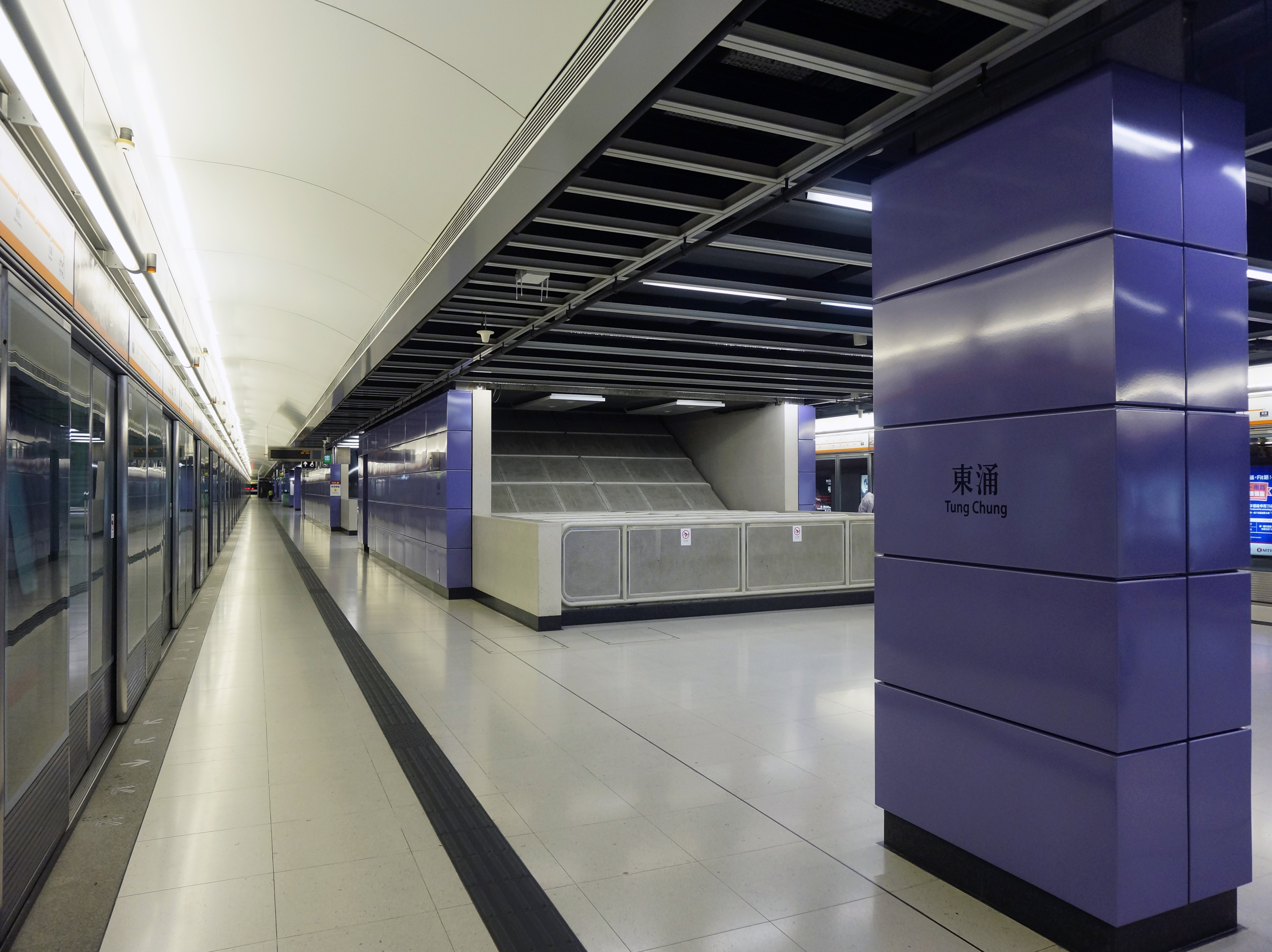
Platform

== Entrances/exits ==
The Tung Chung station concourse is located at ground level. It has four exits (two at each end of the concourse).

- A: Tung Chung Crescent (Red (Urban) taxi stand)
  - Tung Chung Crescent (Block 1–3), Ching Chung Hau Po Woon Primary School, Fu Tung Estate, Fu Tung Plaza, Po On Commercial Association Wan Ho Kan Primary School, Yu Tung Court
- B: Ngong Ping 360
  - Tung Chung Crescent (Blocks 5–9), Citygate Outlets, Ngong Ping 360, Tung Chung Post Office, Tung Chung Station Bus Terminus
- C: Citygate Outlets
- D: Fu Tung Street (Lantau (Blue) taxi stand)
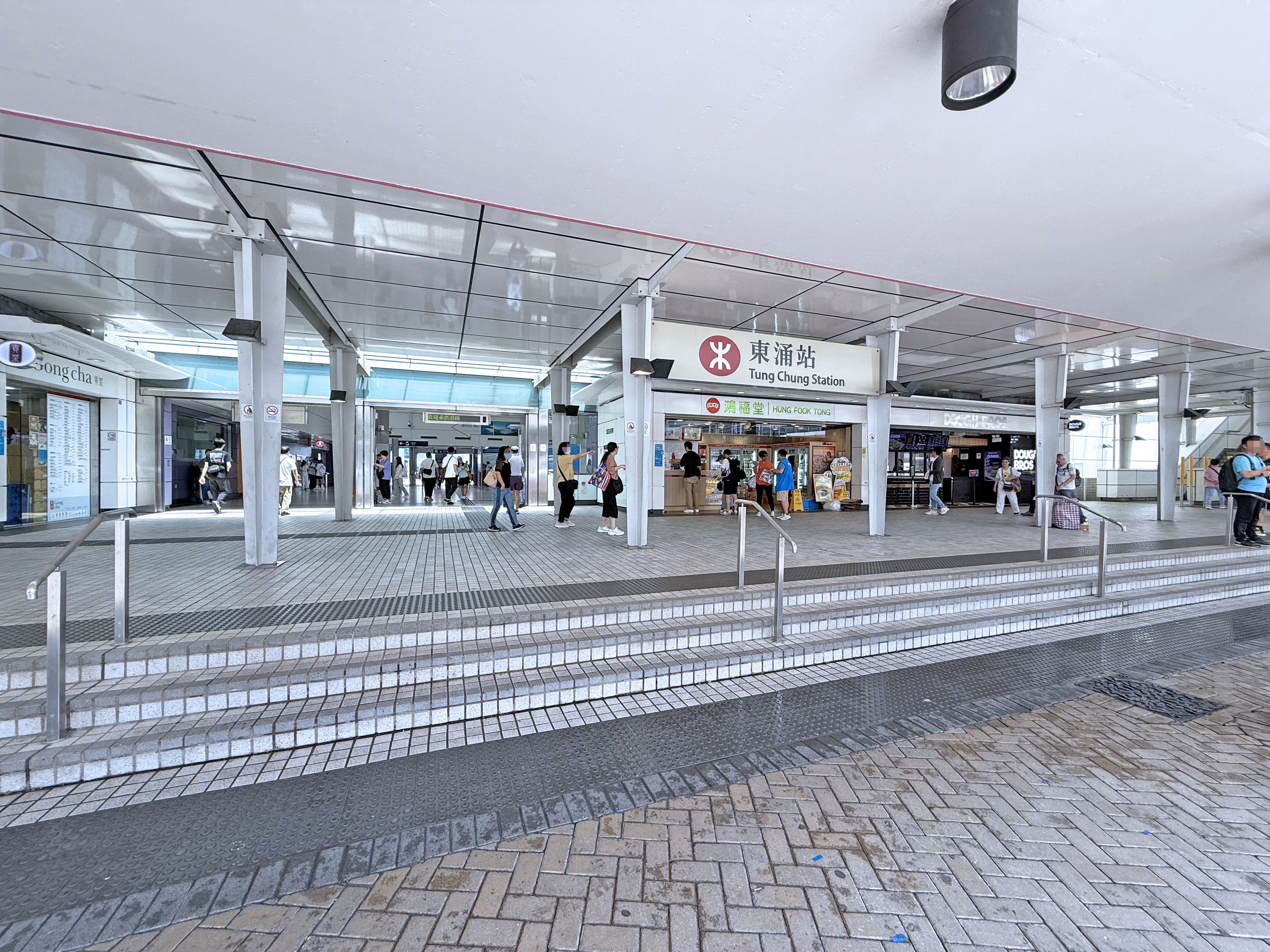
Exit A

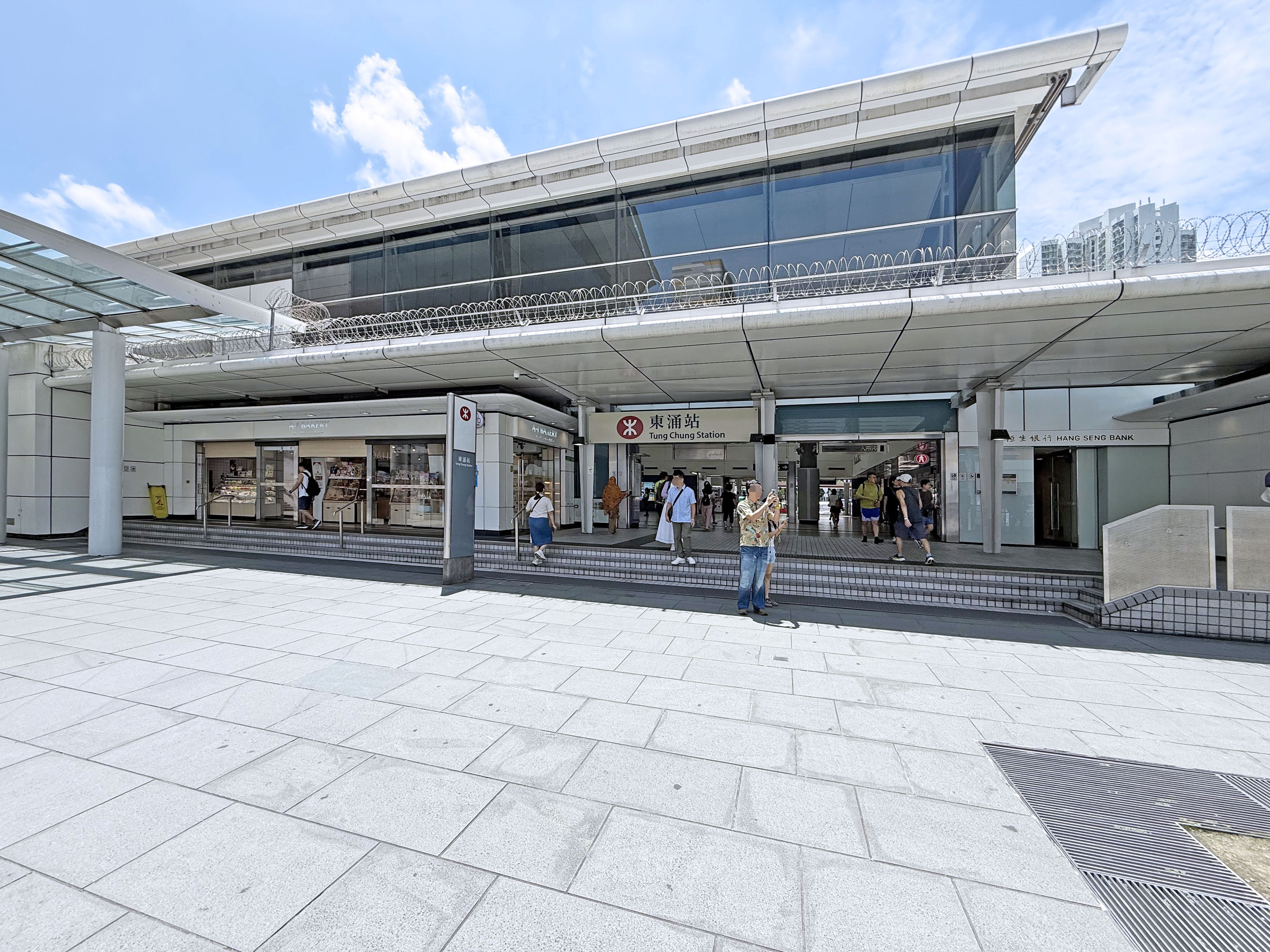
Exit B

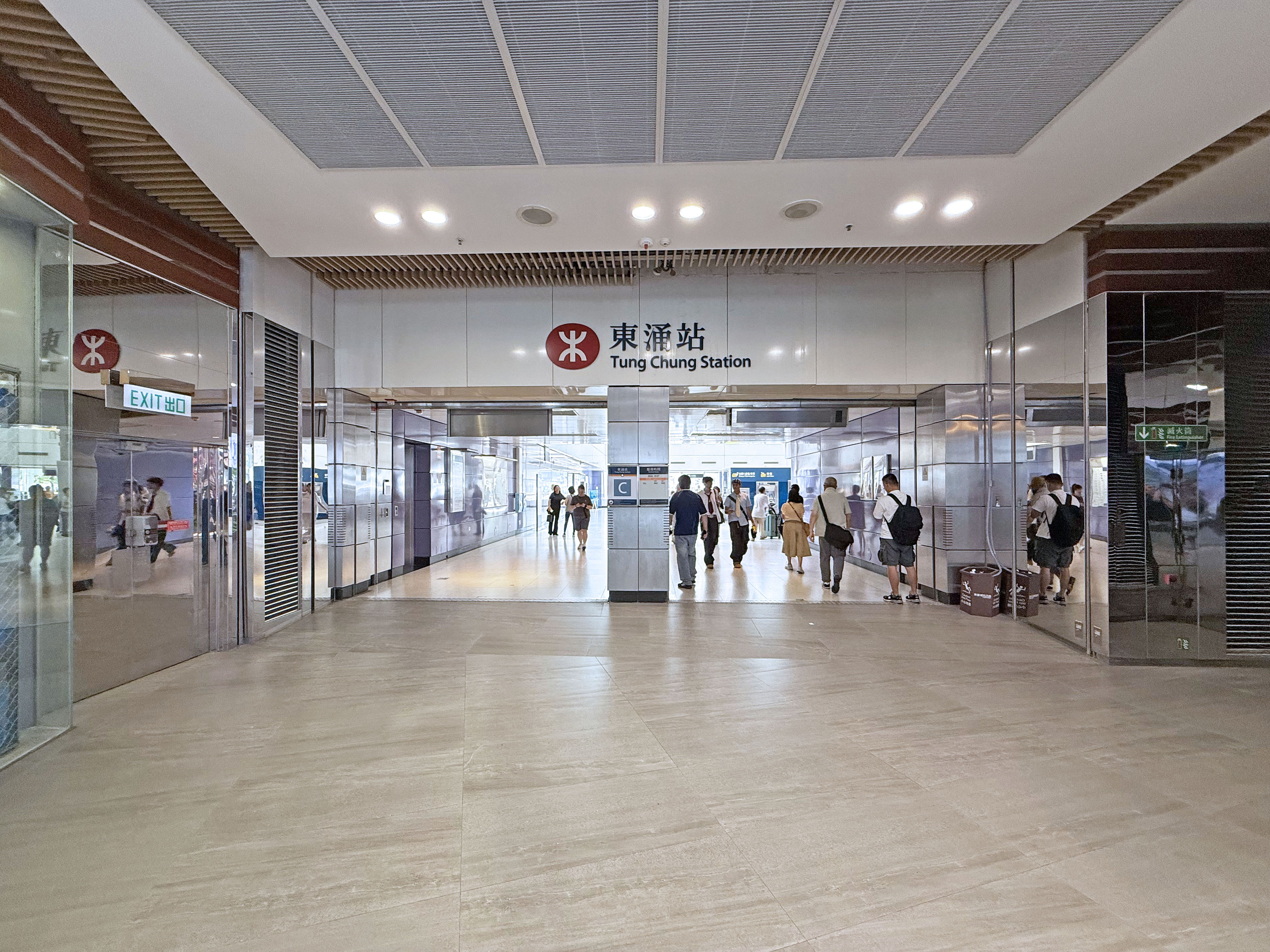
Exit C

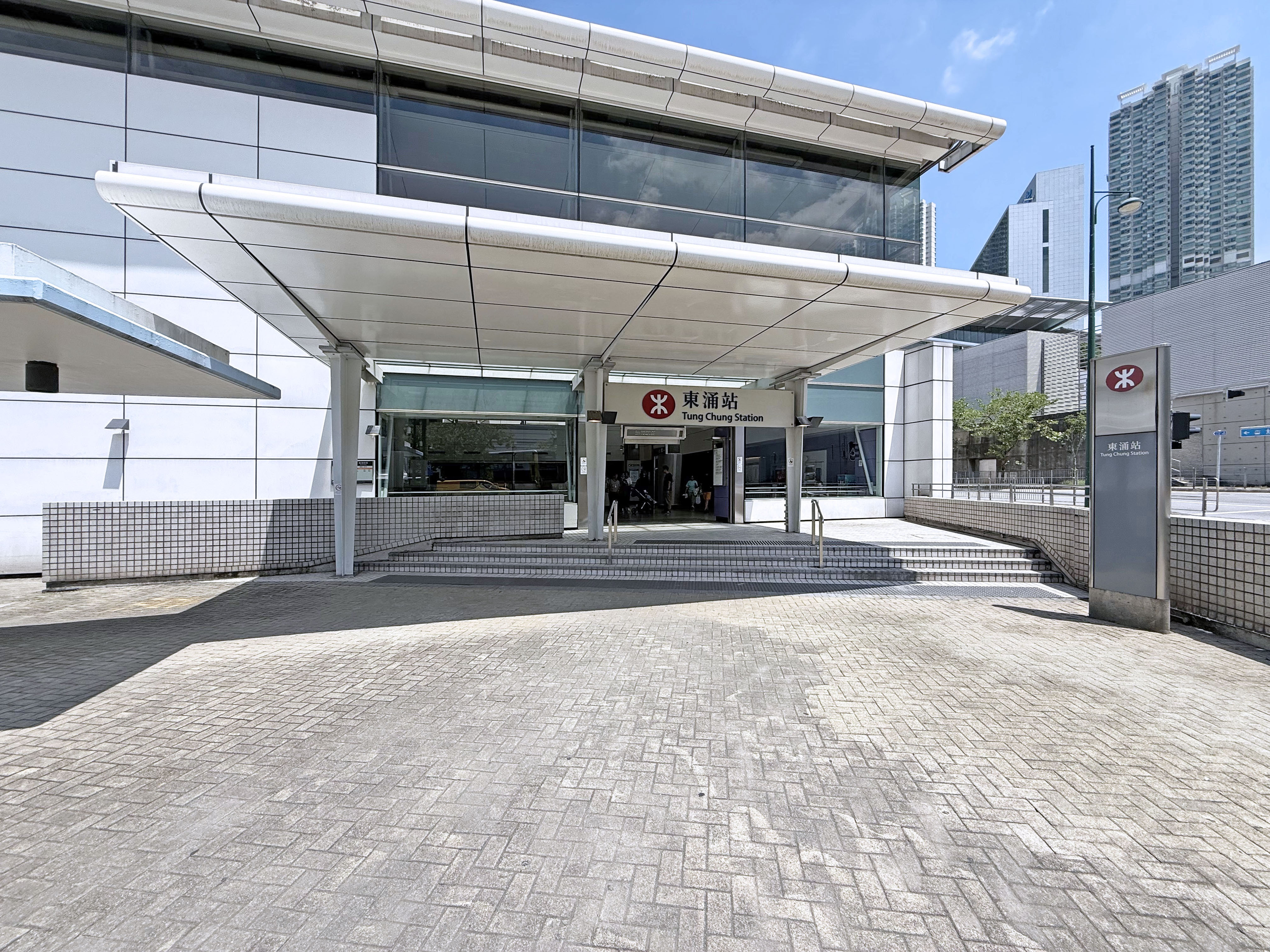
Exit D

== Transport connections ==
=== Taxis ===
An urban (red) taxi stand is located beside Exit A. A Lantau (blue) taxi stand at Exit D provides taxi services within Lantau Island.

=== Ngong Ping Cable Car ===
Opened on 18 September 2006, the MTR-owned Ngong Ping Cable Car connects Tung Chung with Ngong Ping, where the Po Lin Monastery and Tian Tan Buddha are located. The Tung Chung Cable Car Terminal is about 200 metres away from Exit B of Tung Chung station.

=== Buses ===
The station is served by a large number of bus routes which stop near the station and the Ngong Ping Cable Car terminus.

=== Airport routes ===
Routes such as S1, S56, S52, S52A and S52P leads to Chek Lap Kok.

=== Lantau routes ===
Routes such as 37M, 38, N38, 39M and 37H leads to Ying Tung Estate, Yat Tung Estate or Mun Tung Estate.

Routes that are going to Ngong Ping, Tai O, Mui Wo or Shek Mun Kap can be routes 11, 23, 3M and 34.

=== Port routes ===
Routes such as B6 or B6S leads to Hong Kong-Zhuhai-Macau Bridge.
