= TCT =

TCT may refer to:

== Science and technology ==
- Alfa Romeo TCT, a twin-clutch transmission made by FPT Industrial
- Teenage Cancer Trust, a British charity organization
- Thrombin clotting time, a test used in blood coagulation
- Tocotrienol, a group of four isomers occurring in Vitamin E
- True crystallization temperature, the temperature at which salt crystals begin to crystallize from a solution
- The Coroner's Toolkit, a suite of computer forensic software
- Tungsten carbide-tipped, hardened metal used for example in an annular cutter or drill bit
- TCT, a codon for the amino acid Serine

== Transportation ==
- Tate's Cairn Tunnel, a Hong Kong tunnel
- Texas City Terminal Railway, a 32-mile-long railroad
- Trans Canada Trail, a proposed trail that would stretch across Canada
- Tung Chung Terminal, a Hong Kong gondola lift station of Ngong Ping 360

== Arts and media ==
- The Catholic Transcript, a Catholic paper in Hartford, Connecticut, United States
- The Catholic Thing, a Catholic online publication
- TCT (band), a Finnish band
- Total Christian Television, a Christian cable television network broadcasting in the US and Canada (formerly known as Tri-State Christian Television)
- Tucker Carlson Tonight, the eponymous talk show of conservative political commentator and author Tucker Carlson which aired on Fox News from 2016 until 2023.
- The Campaign Trail, a game created by Dan Bryan

== Other uses ==
- Touring Club de Tunisie, a member of the Fédération Internationale de l'Automobile
