= Tung Chung Terminal =

Tung Chung Terminal 東涌
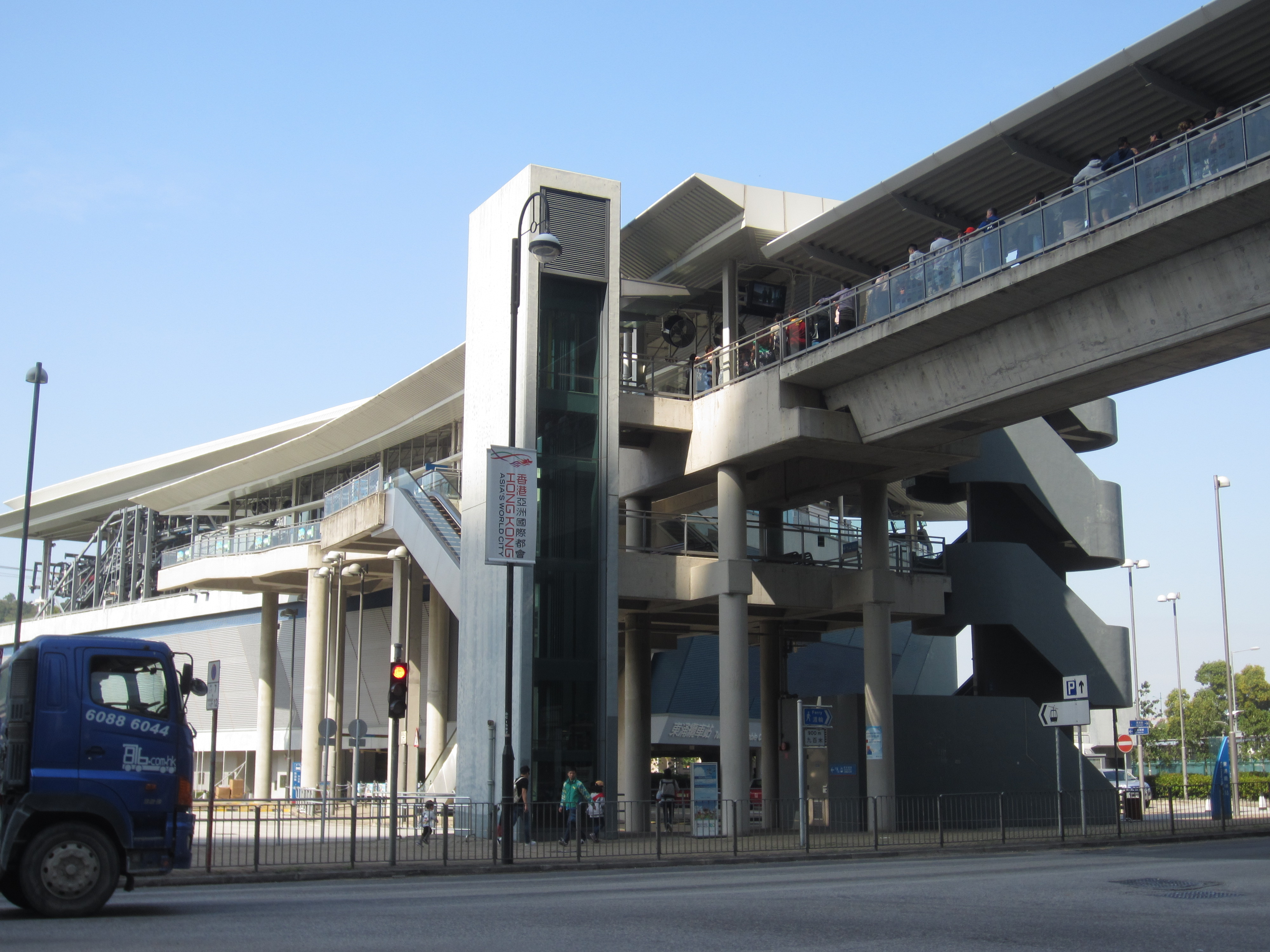
- Part of the station in 2017

General information
- Location: Tung Chung, Hong Kong; China
- Coordinates: 22.29018°N 113.93869°E
- System: Gondola lift
- Operator: Ngong Ping 360 Limited
- Line: Ngong Ping 360

History
- Opened: 18 September 2006

Services
Preceding station	MTR	Following station
Terminus	Ngong Ping 360	Ngong Ping Terminal Terminus
Location

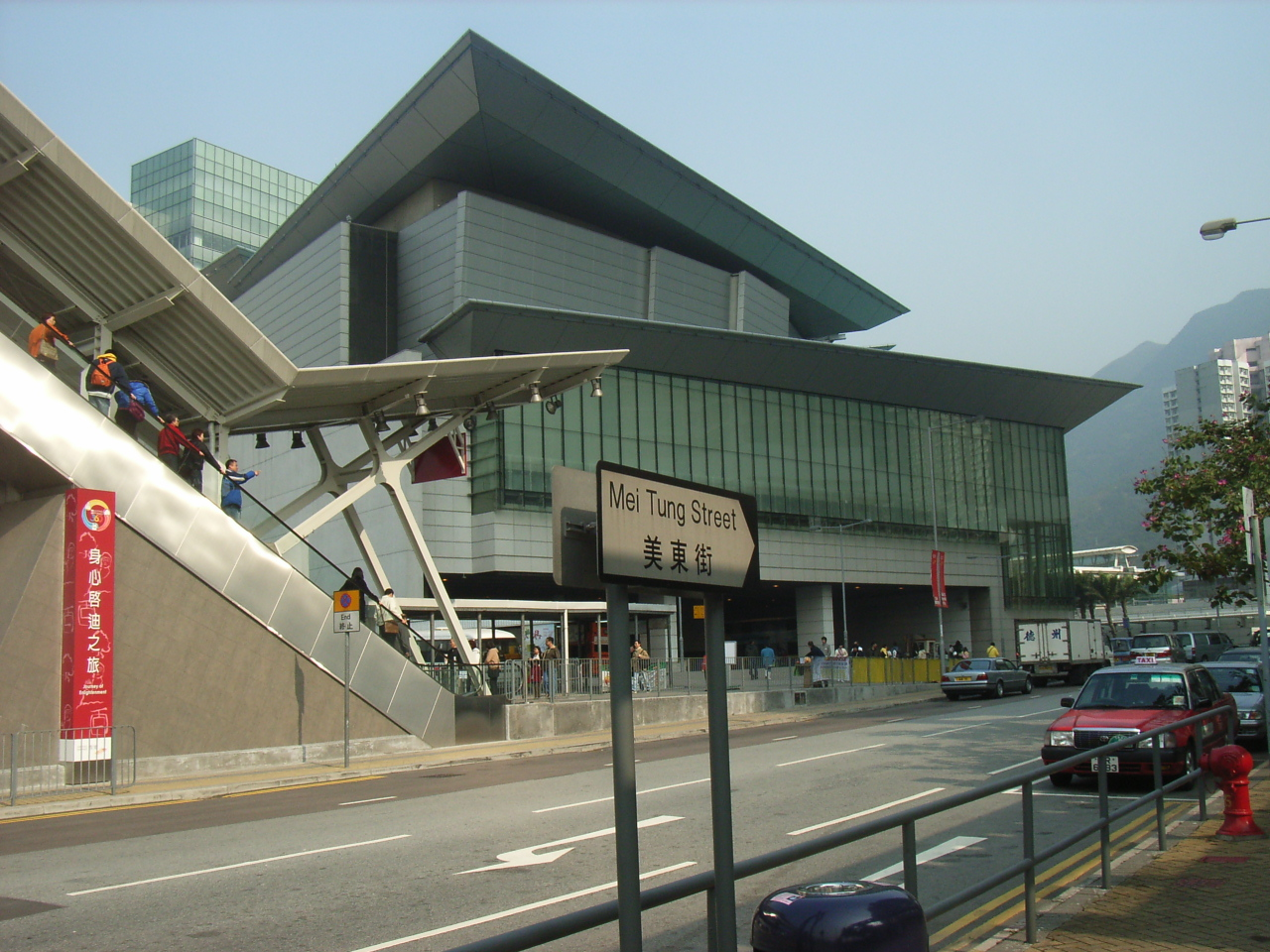
The station from Mei Tung Street, 2007

The Tung Chung Terminal is a station of Ngong Ping 360, a gondola lift line, in Tung Chung on the northwestern coast of Lantau Island in Hong Kong. It was opened on 18 September 2006.
