= Ngong Ping =

Highland on Lantau Island, Hong Kong

Coordinates: 22.25537°N 113.90430°E

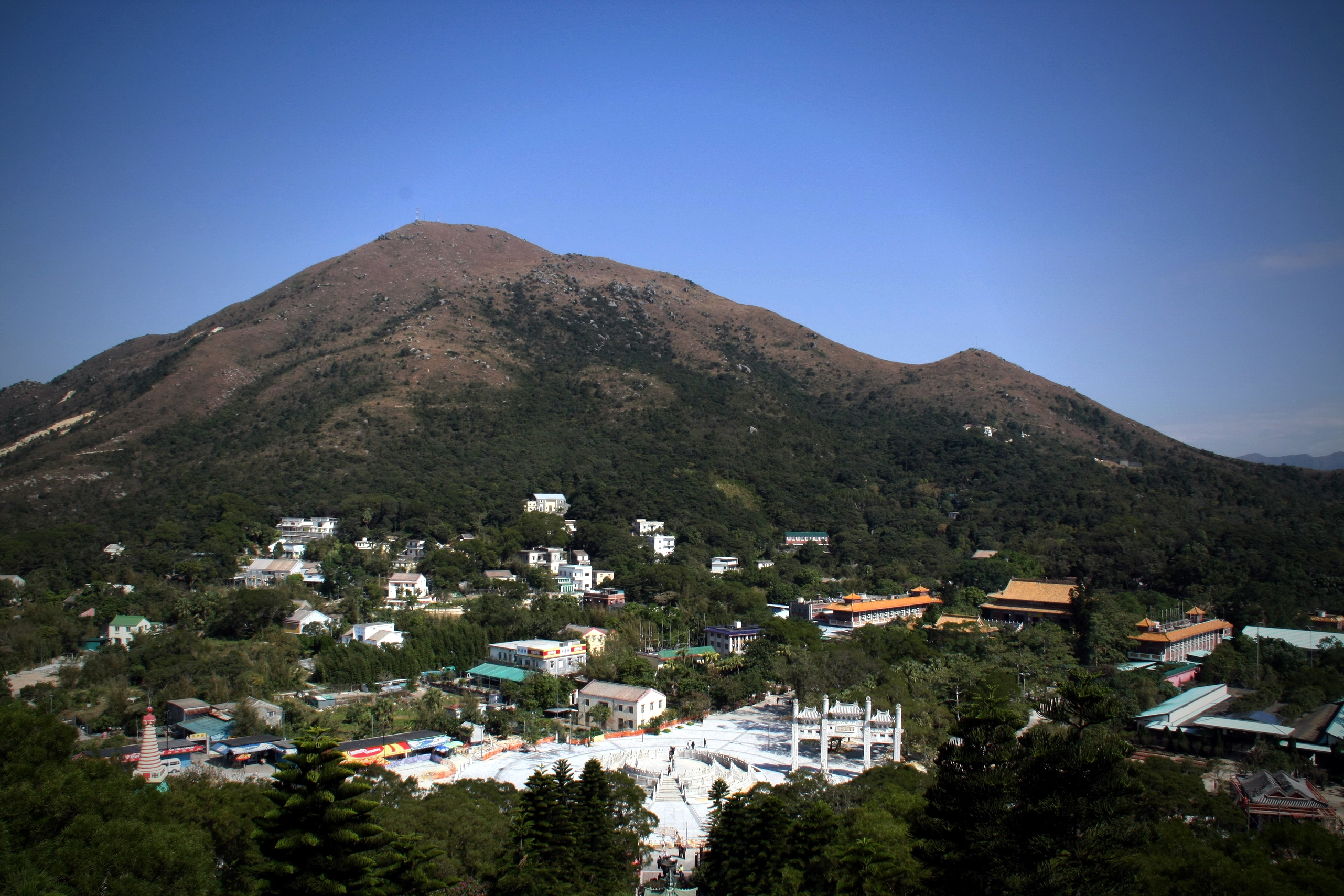
Po Lin Monastery in Ngong Ping. The hill in the background is Nei Lak Shan.

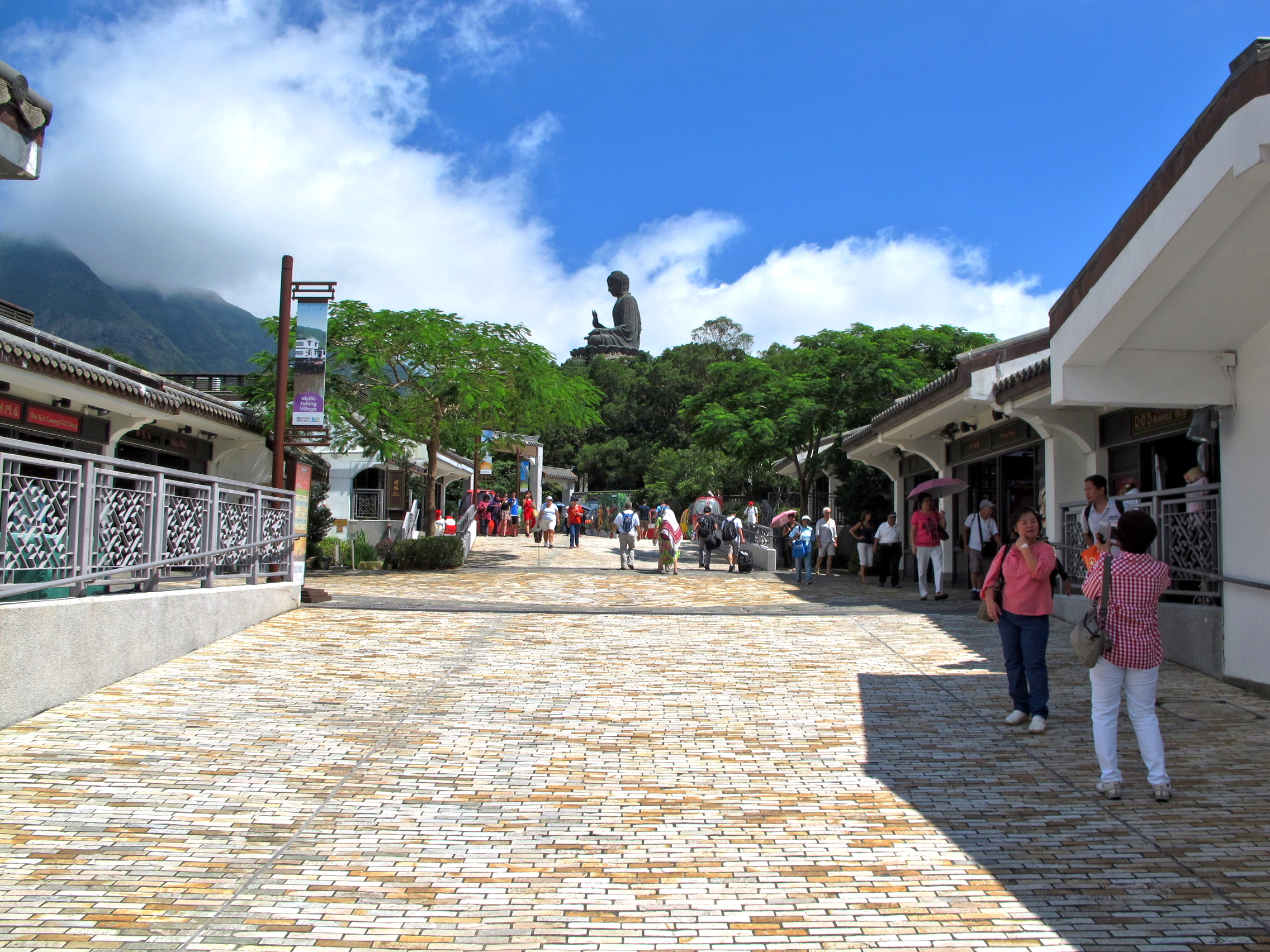
Tian Tan Buddha viewed from the Ngong Ping Village.

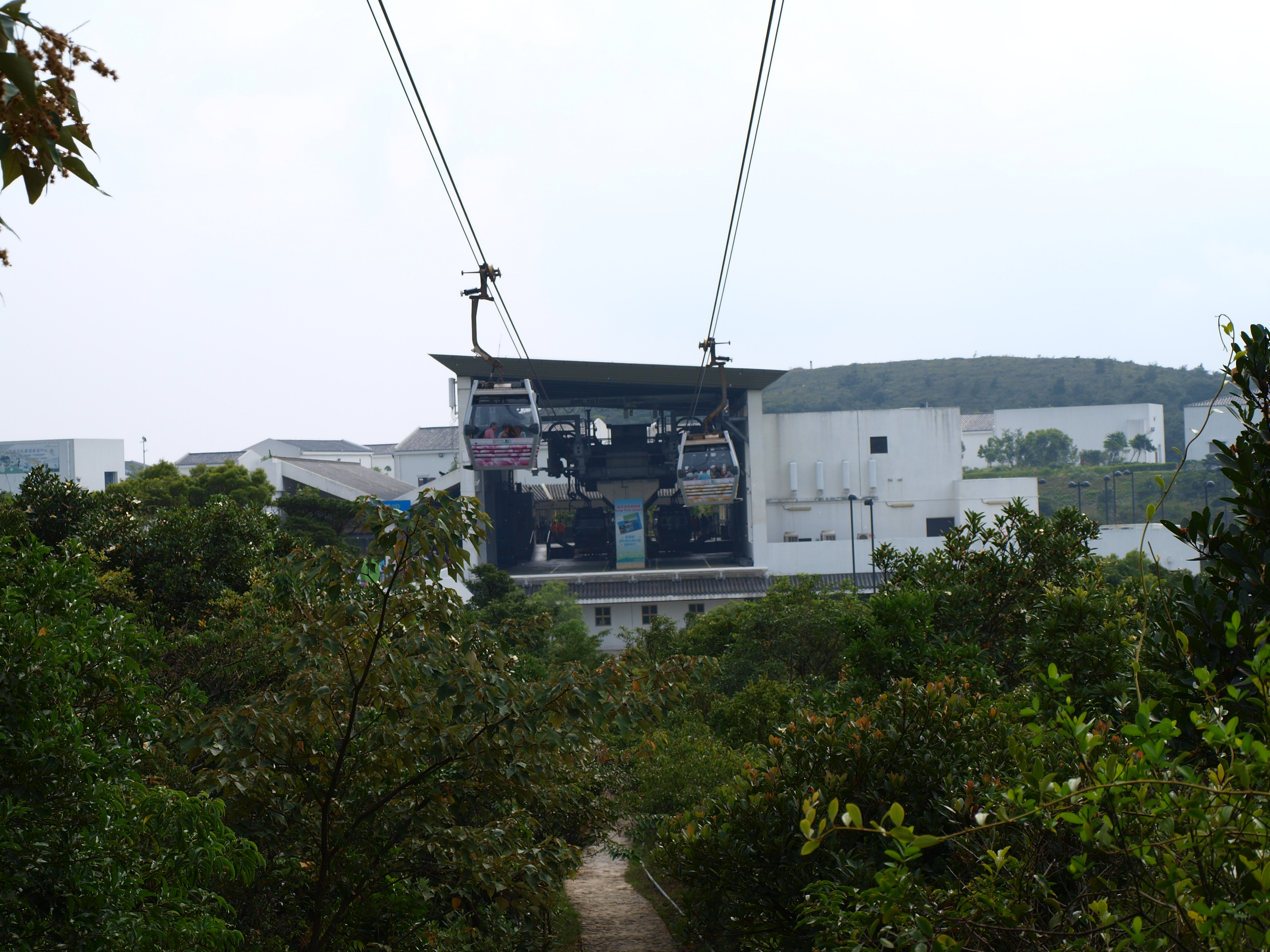
Ngong Ping Terminal of Ngong Ping 360.

Ngong Ping (Chinese: 昂坪) is a highland in the western part of Lantau Island, Hong Kong. It hosts Po Lin Monastery and Tian Tan Buddha amidst the hills which is about 34 m tall. There are several hills nearby which are also an attraction to tourists. It is now the terminus of the cable car ride Ngong Ping 360 which travels to Tung Chung. New facilities and tourist attractions have opened including the Ngong Ping Village, Walking with the Buddha, the Monkey's Tale Theatre and Ngong Ping Tea House. A youth hostel is located near the monastery. The second highest peak of Hong Kong, Lantau Peak, is at its southeast.

== Administration ==
Ngong Ping Wan is a recognized village under the New Territories Small House Policy.

== Tourism projects ==
In 2002, the Hong Kong government announced that the MTR Corporation (MTRC) had secured the rights to run a cable car which formed part of a HK$750 million tourism project scheduled for completion in August 2005. Under the plan, a theme village would be built at Ngong Ping along a 'tourist corridor', with 6,000 square metres of shop space and an 18,600-square-metre piazza between the cable car terminal and the Po Lin Monastery. A 5.5 km cable car line, jointly managed by the MTRC and Skyrail-ITM of Australia, would link it to Tung Chung station, in the vicinity of Hong Kong International Airport. Government-funded infrastructure works were estimated to cost $70 million.

The MTRC were granted the rights to develop and run businesses within the tourist corridor, which religious groups feared could destroy the area's religious environment, and threaten the closure of the Po Lin Monastery by draining their revenues. Environmental groups also expressed concerns about the project: the Conservancy Association feared the project would endanger woodland and brooks nearby, by threatening butterfly-habitat. The government, however, said it had considered the views of religious and green groups, and reassured that the design would "preserve the tranquil atmosphere." The Travel Industry Council welcomed the "long overdue" project; the MTRC said the project would create 300 jobs.

== Entertainments ==
The press conference of Ultimate Song Chart Awards Presentation was held in Ngong Ping Village in November 2021, 2022 and 2023.

== See also ==
- List of areas of Hong Kong
