= Ngong Ping Terminal =

Coordinates: 22°15′22.6″N 113°54′05.0″E

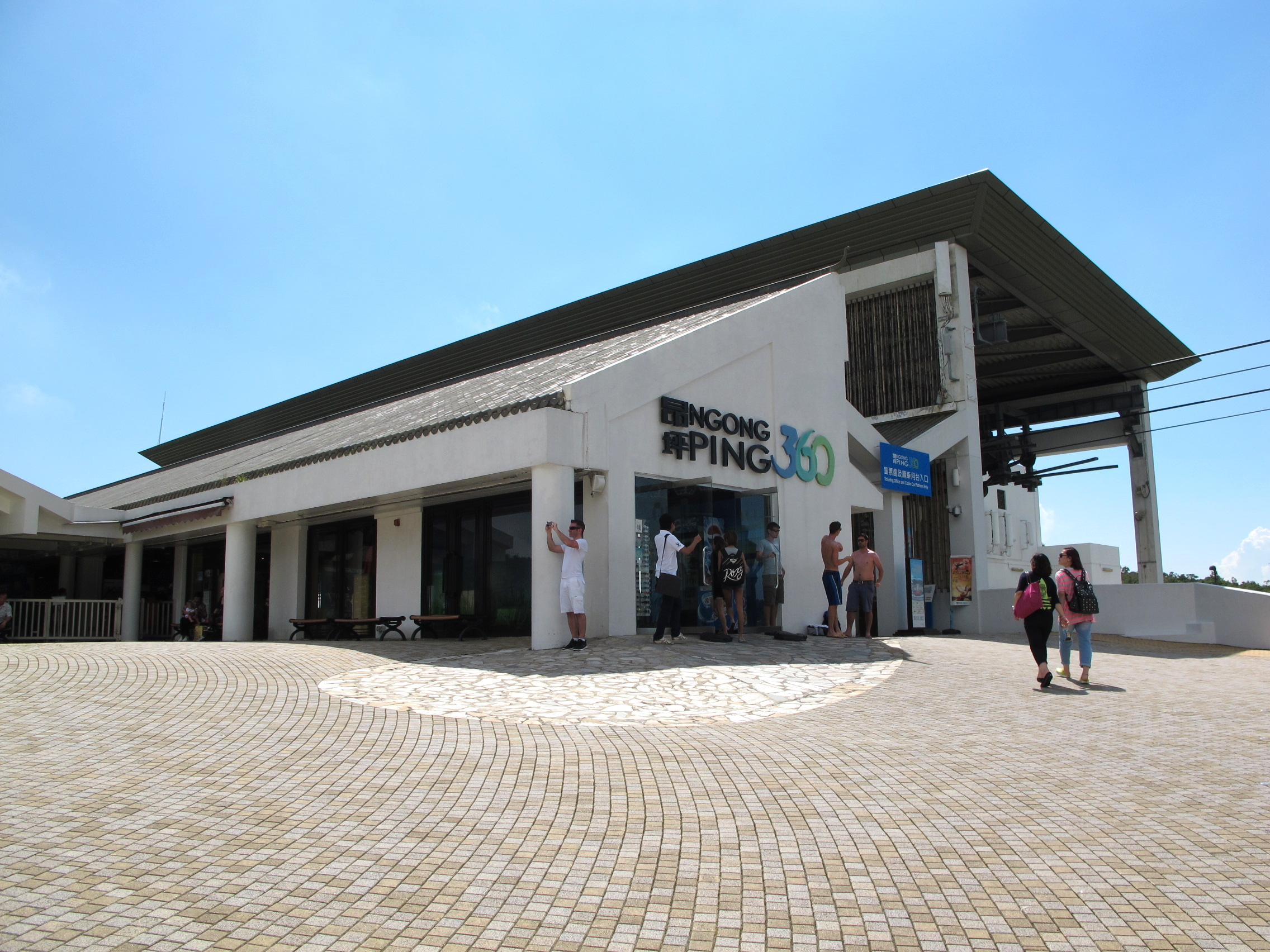

General information
- Location: Hong Kong
- System: Gondola lift

Services
Preceding station	MTR	Following station
Tung Chung towards Tung Chung Terminal	Ngong Ping 360	Terminus
Location

The Ngong Ping Terminal is a station of Ngong Ping 360, a gondola lift line, located on Lantau Island's Ngong Ping in Hong Kong. It was opened on 18 September 2006.
