= The Big Buddha (Hong Kong) =

Large bronze statue of Buddha

- 天壇大佛
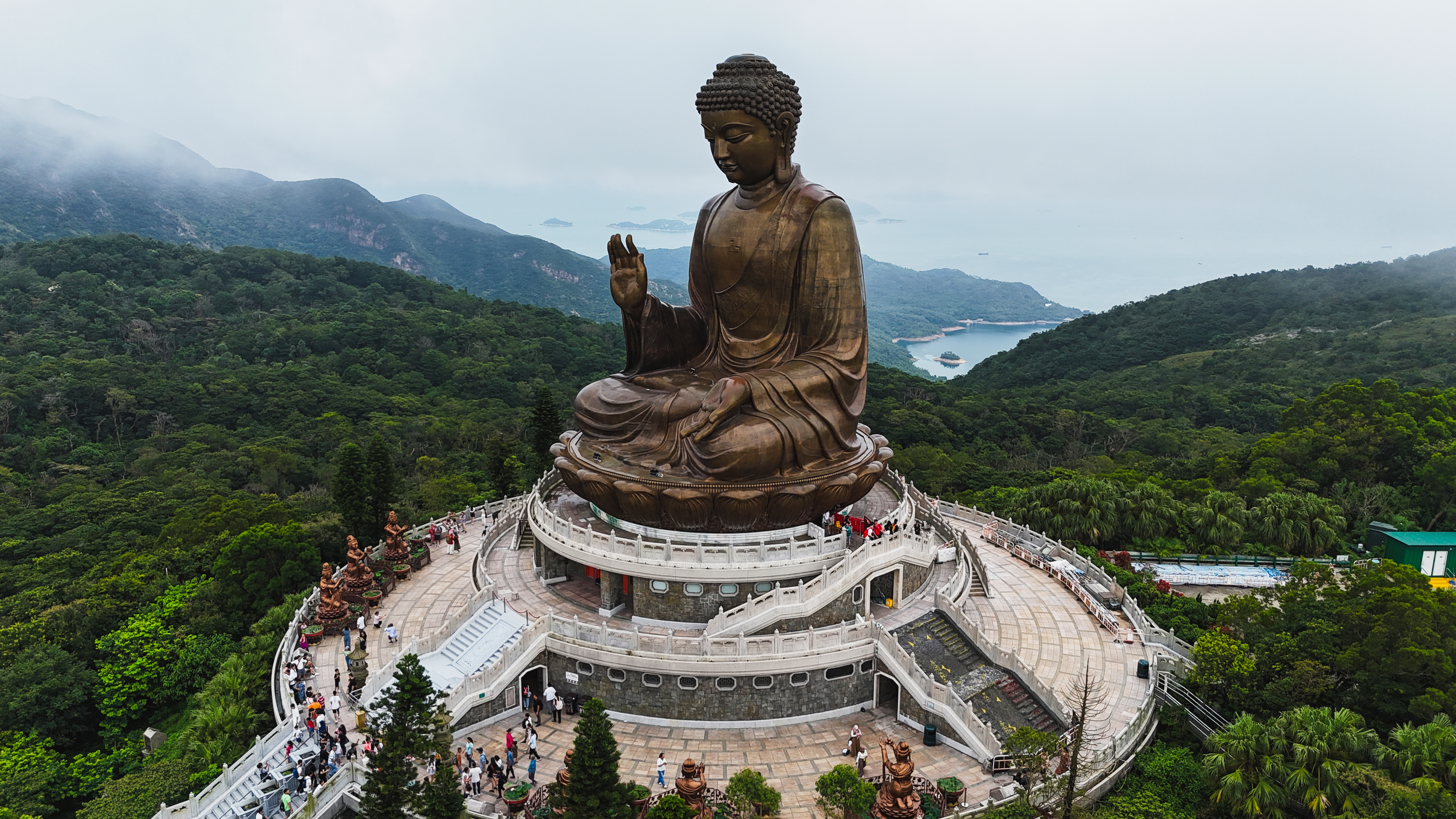
- The statue in 2023
- Interactive map of The Big Buddha
- Location: Hong Kong
- Coordinates: 22°15′15″N 113°54′19″E
- Material: Bronze
- Height: 34 m (112 ft)
- Completion date: 29 December 1993

The Big Buddha
- Traditional Chinese: 天壇大佛
- Simplified Chinese: 天坛大佛
Transcriptions
Standard Mandarin
- Hanyu Pinyin: Tiāntán Dà Fó
Yue: Cantonese
- Yale Romanization: Tīn tàahn daaih faht
- Jyutping: Tin1 taan4 daai6 fat6

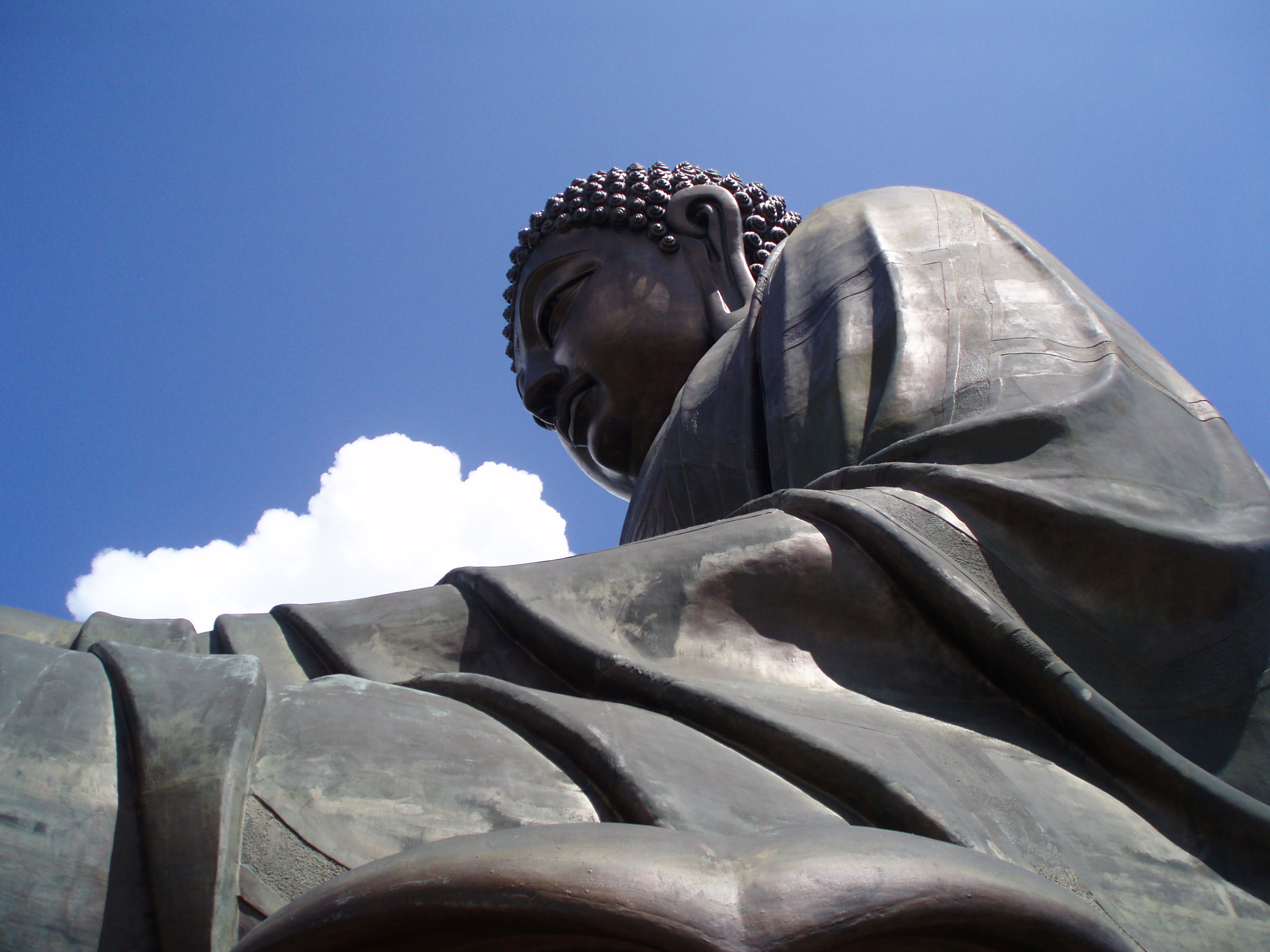
View from the upper platform, with detail of the Buddha's robes clearly visible.

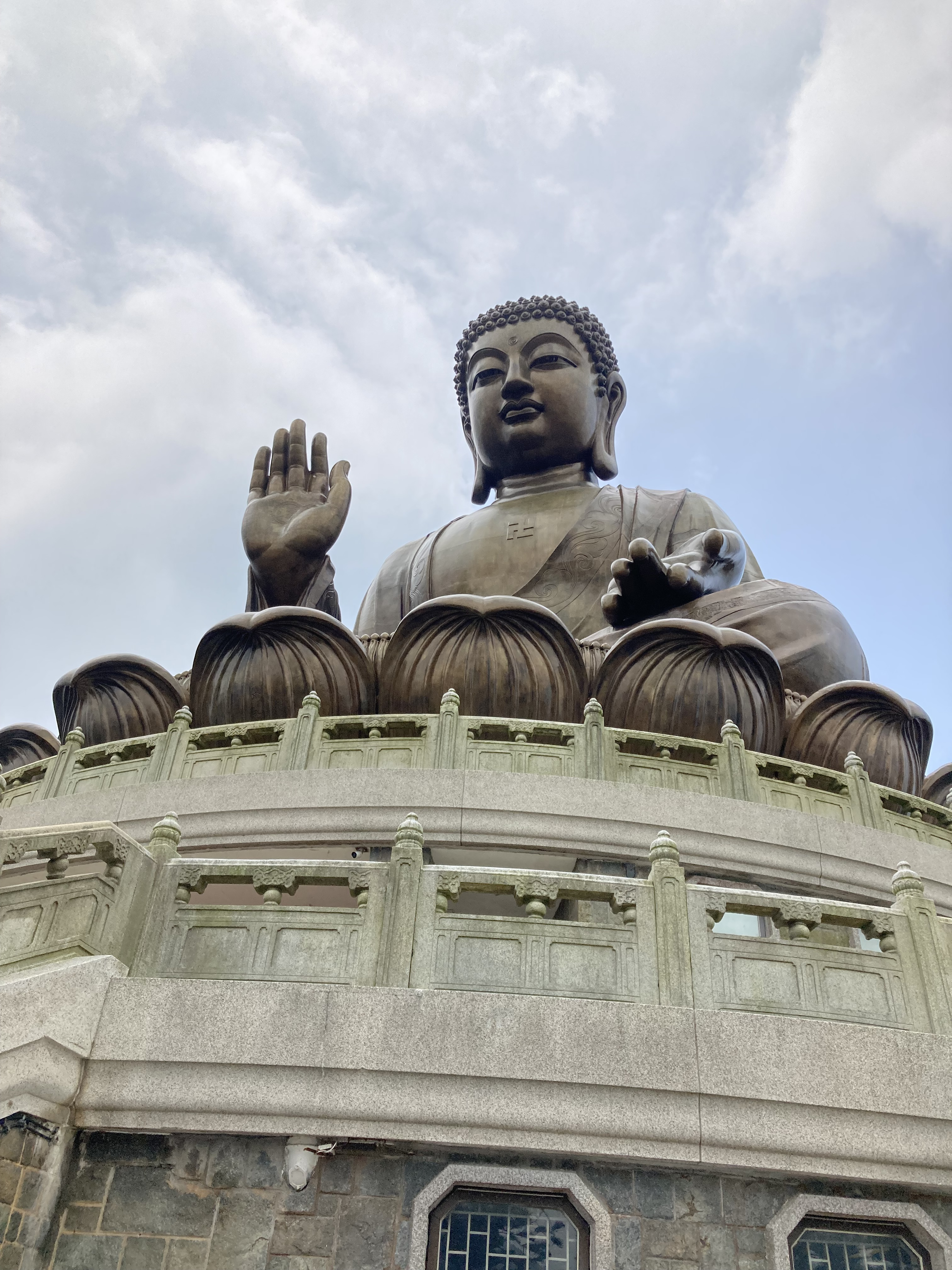
View from the lower platform.

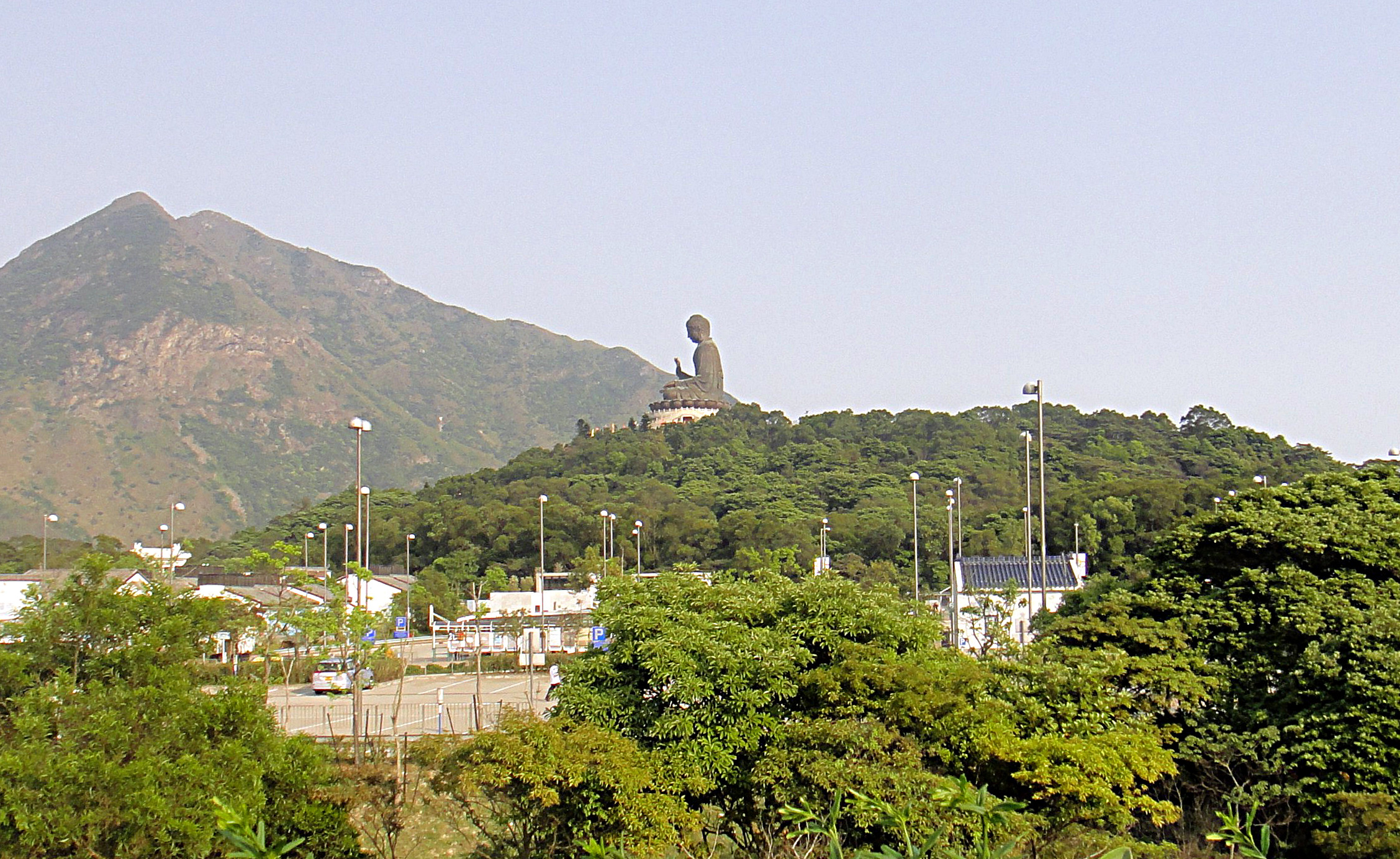
A view of Big Buddha from Ngong Ping Village

The Tian Tan Big Buddha is a large bronze sculpture of Gautama Buddha, completed in 1993, and located at Ngong Ping, near Po Lin Monastery on Lantau Island, Hong Kong.

== Construction ==
The sculpture's base is a model of the one in the United Kingdom. One of the five large Buddha images in China, it is enthroned on a lotus on top of a three-platform altar. Surrounding it are six smaller bronze images known as "The Offering of the Six Devas" that are posed offering flowers, incense, lamp, ointment, fruit, and music to the Buddha, representing the Six Perfections of generosity, morality, patience, zeal, meditation, and wisdom, necessary for Enlightenment in life.

The 34 m (112 ft) tall image weighs over 250 metric tons (280 short tons), and was constructed from 202 bronze pieces. In addition to the exterior components, there is a strong steel framework inside to support the heavy load. Visitors have to climb 268 steps to reach the Buddha, though the site also features a small winding road for vehicles to provide access for physically challenged people. The Buddha's right hand is raised, representing the removal of affliction, while the left rests open on his lap in a gesture of generosity.

The monument also features three internal exhibit floors beneath the image: the halls of the Universe, of Benevolent Merit and of Remembrance. One of the most renowned features inside is a relic of Gautama Buddha, consisting of some of his alleged cremated remains.

== History ==
Plans to construct a Buddha statue began in 1973, after monks from Po Lin Monastery visited the Great Buddha of Kamakura in Japan and the Great Buddha of Changhua in Taiwan. The following year, the British government would grant a 6,567-meter plot of land next to the temple for the construction of a Buddha statue.

The Big Buddha's construction began in 1990, and was finished on 29 December 1993, which the Chinese reckon as the day of the Buddha's enlightenment. When the image was completed, monks from around the world were invited to the opening ceremony. Distinguished visitors from mainland China, Hong Kong, Taiwan, India, Japan, Korea, Thailand, Malaysia, Singapore, Sri Lanka, and the United States all took part in the proceedings.

On 18 October 1999, the Hong Kong Post Office issued a definitive issue of landmark stamps, of which the HK$2.50 value depicts The Big Buddha. On 22 May 2012, it was also featured on the HK$3 value of the Five Festival set, this one celebrating the birth of Sakyamuni Buddha.

The 2003 film Infernal Affairs III opens with a scene shot at the Big Buddha.

== Visiting and access ==
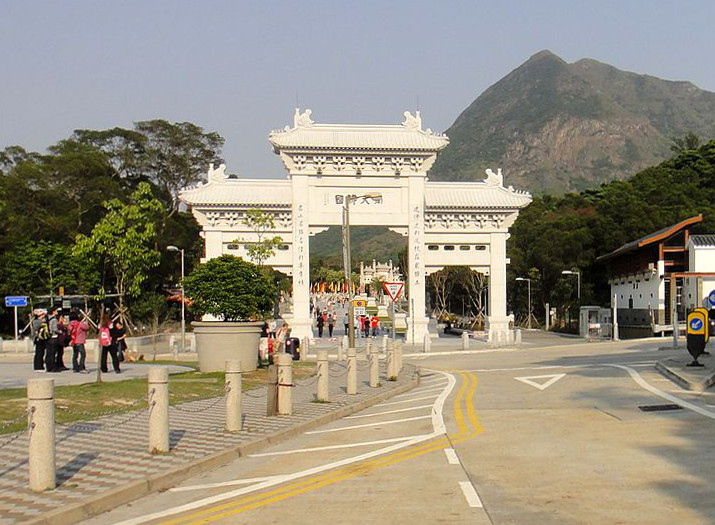
Entrance

Po Lin Monastery and the Buddha are open to the public between 10:00 and 17:30. Access to the outside of the Buddha is free of charge, but there is an admission fee to go inside the Buddha.

Visitors can reach the site by bus or taxi, travelling first to Mui Wo (also known as "Silvermine Bay") via ferry from the Outlying Islands piers in Central (pier No. 6) or to Tung Chung station via the MTR, or cable car. Visitors may then travel to and from the Buddha via the following bus routes:

- Mui Wo ↔ Ngong Ping — NLB No. 2
- Tung Chung ↔ Ngong Ping – NLB No. 23

The Ngong Ping 360 gondola lift between Tung Chung and Ngong Ping (25 minutes).

== See also ==
- Laykyun Sekkya
- Great Buddha of Thailand
- Great Buddha
- Buddhist art
- Chinese Buddhism
