= Po Lin Monastery =

Buddhist monastery in Hong Kong

- 寶蓮禪寺
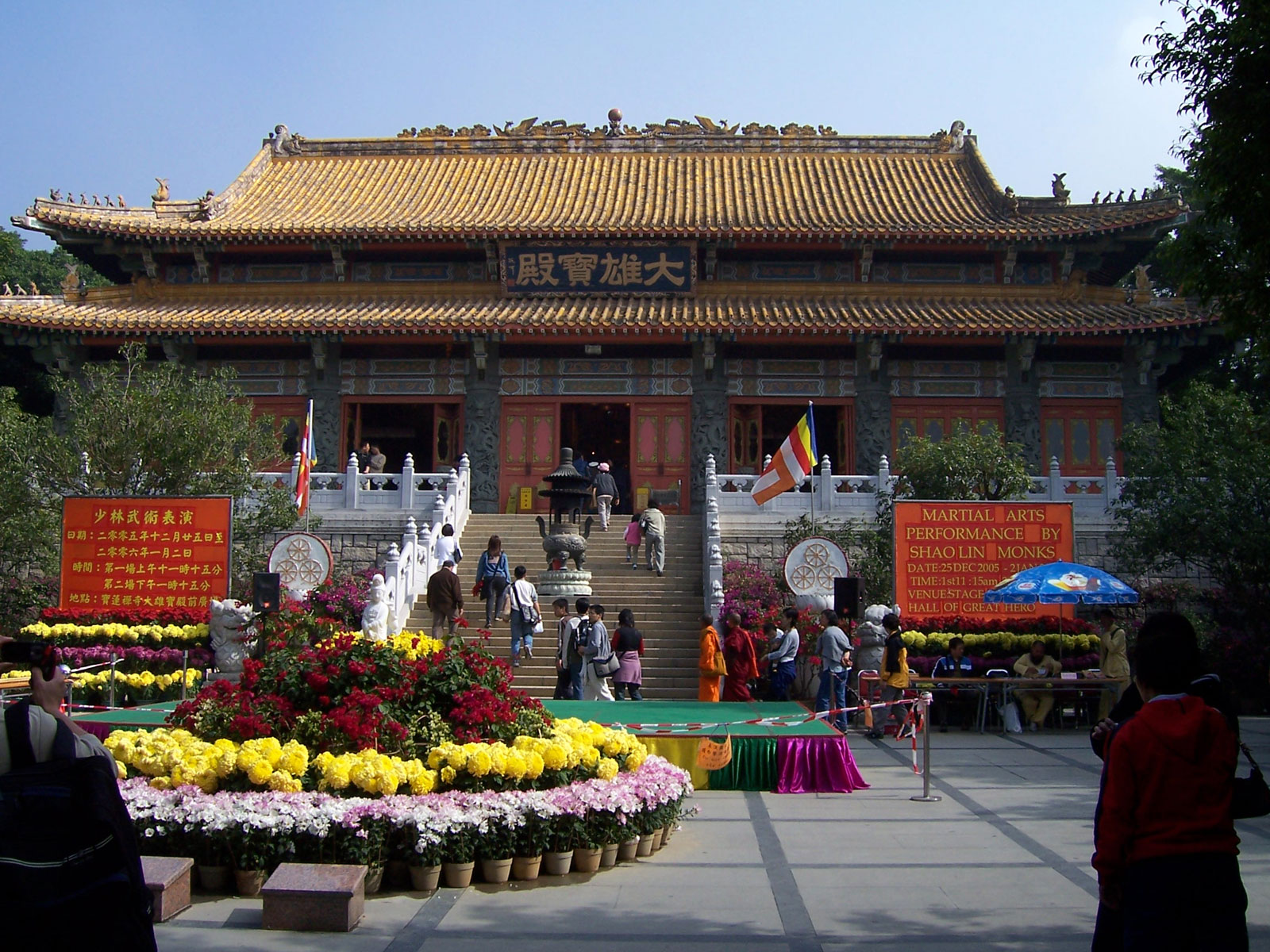
- Po Lin Monastery exterior

- Location within Hong Kong

Monastery information
- Established: 1906; 120 years ago
- Dedication: Guanyin

Site
- Location: Lantau Island
- Coordinates: 22.25551°N 113.90789°E
- Website: Official website

Po Lin Monastery
- Traditional Chinese: 寶蓮禪寺
- Simplified Chinese: 宝莲禅寺
- Literal meaning: Precious Lotus Zen Temple
Transcriptions
Standard Mandarin
- Hanyu Pinyin: Bǎo lián Chán sì
Yue: Cantonese
- Yale Romanization: Bóu lìhn sìhm jih
- Jyutping: Bo^{2} lin^{4} sim^{4} zi^{6}

Po Lin Monastery is a Chan Buddhist monastery, located on Ngong Ping Plateau, on Lantau Island, Hong Kong.

== History ==
The monastery was founded in 1906 by three monks visiting from Jiangsu Province and was initially known simply as "The Big Hut" (Chinese: 大茅蓬; Jyutping: daai6 maau4 pung4). It was renamed to its present name in 1924. The main temple houses three bronze statues of the Buddha – representing his past, present and future lives – as well as many Buddhist scriptures.

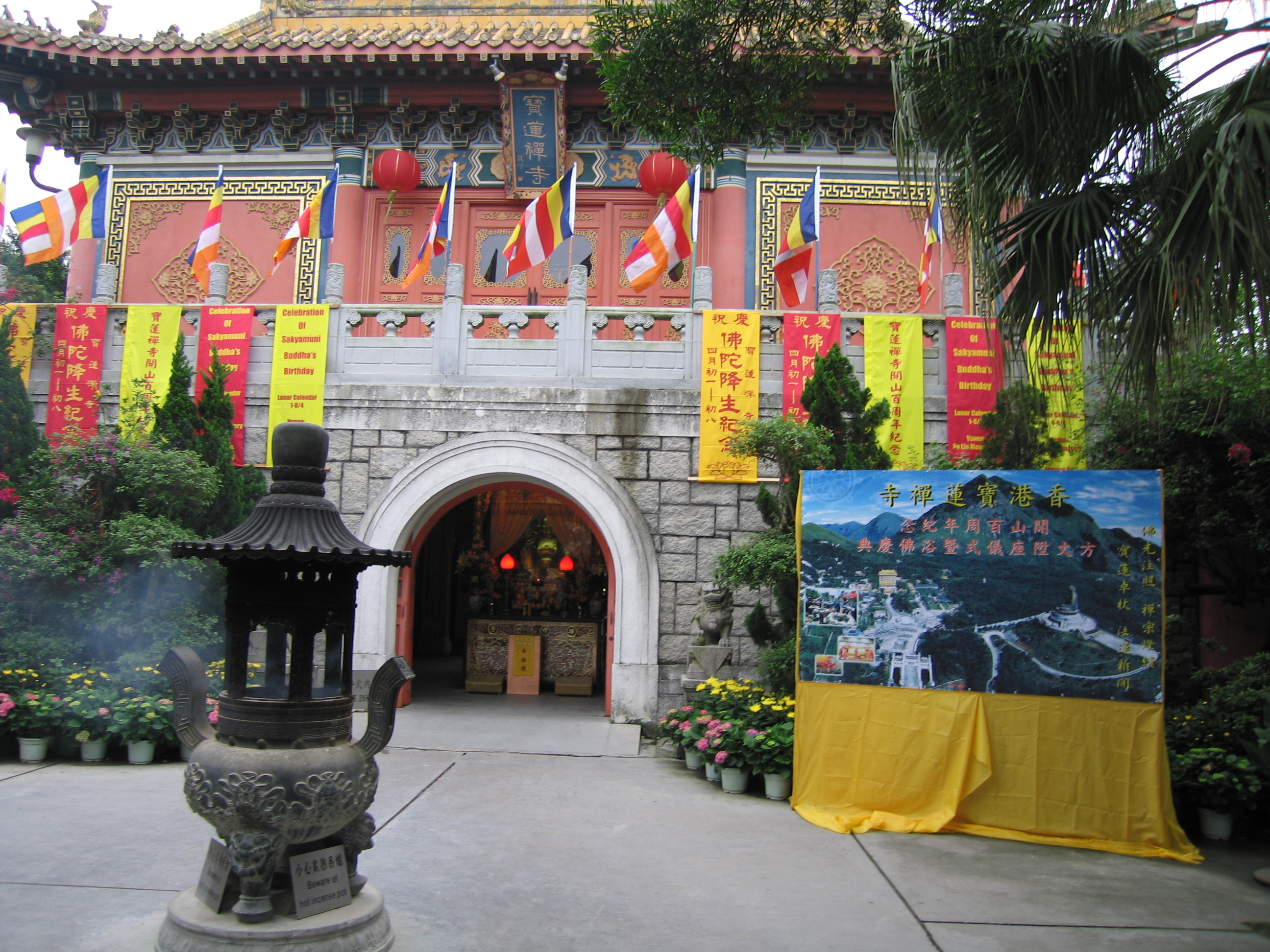
Po Lin Monastery main temple (note map of full site in photo)

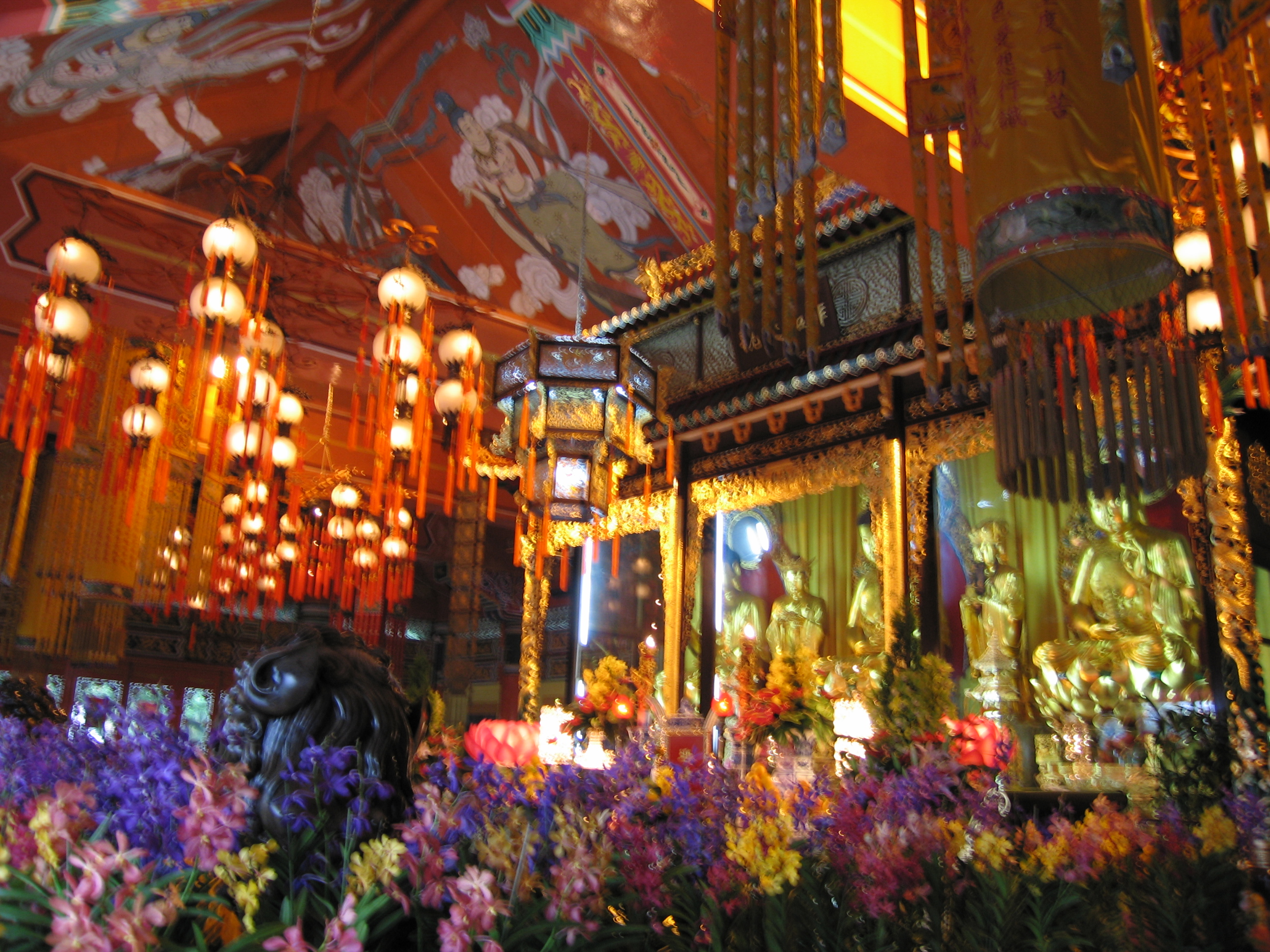
Po Lin Monastery interior

Tian Tan Buddha, a giant Buddha statue completed in 1993, is an extension of the monastery.

The monastery boasts many prominent architectural structures, such as the Main Shrine Hall of Buddha, the Hall of Bodhisattva Skanda.

This monastery is also noted for making wooden bracelets that are only sold near the Tian Tan Buddha statue.

In 1918, three nuns ordained at this monastery established a private nunnery called Chi Chuk Lam (紫竹林) on Lantau's Lower Keung Hill (下羌山). The nunnery is dedicated to Guanyin, the Goddess of Mercy. There were about 20 jushi and nuns residing there in the 1950s, but now only an elderly abbess remains.

== See also ==
- Buddhism in Hong Kong
- Buddhist Fat Ho Memorial College
- The Big Buddha (Hong Kong)
