= Ma Wan Chung =

Coordinates: 22.285149°N 113.935825°E

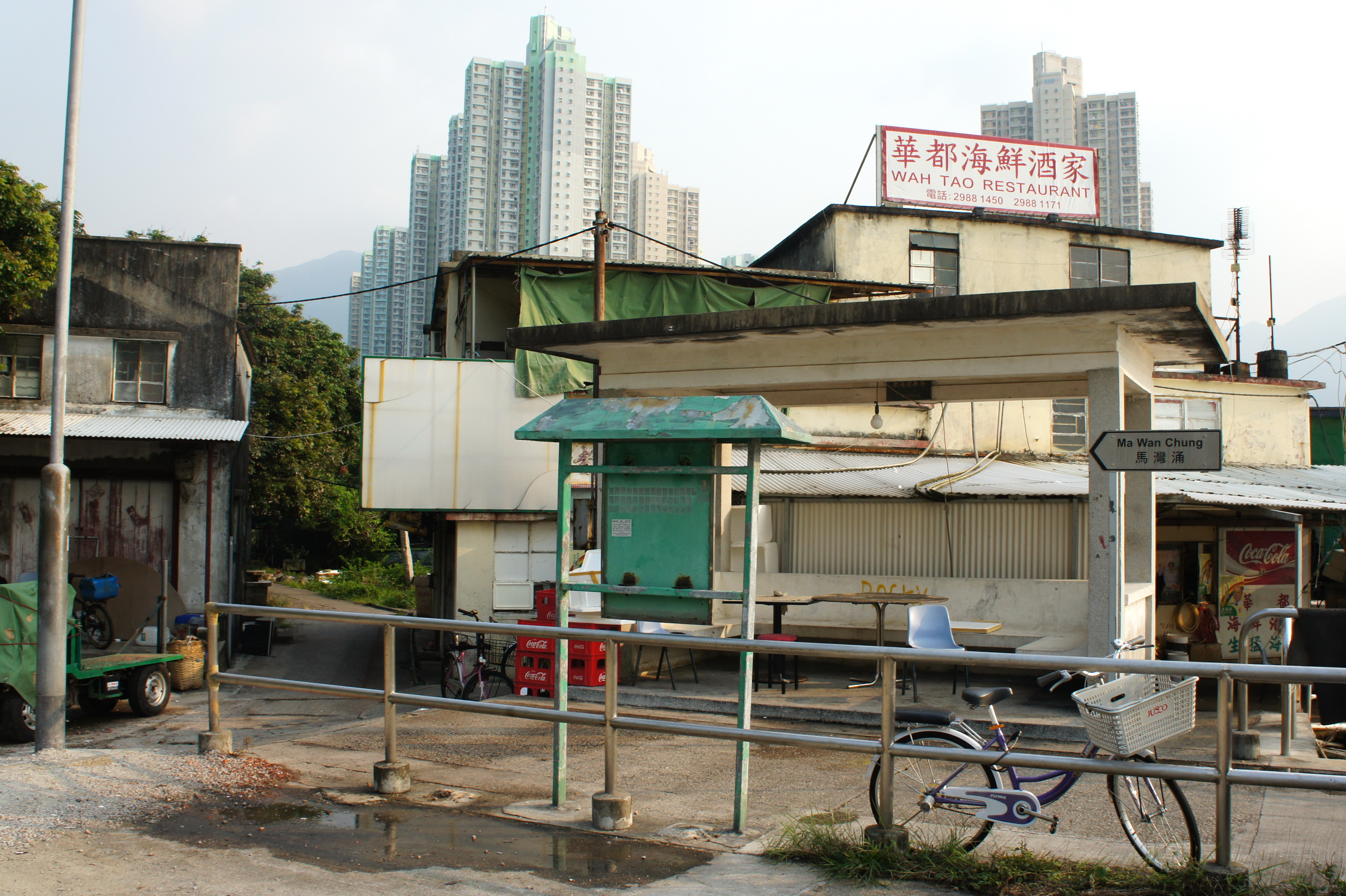
Ma Wan Chung.

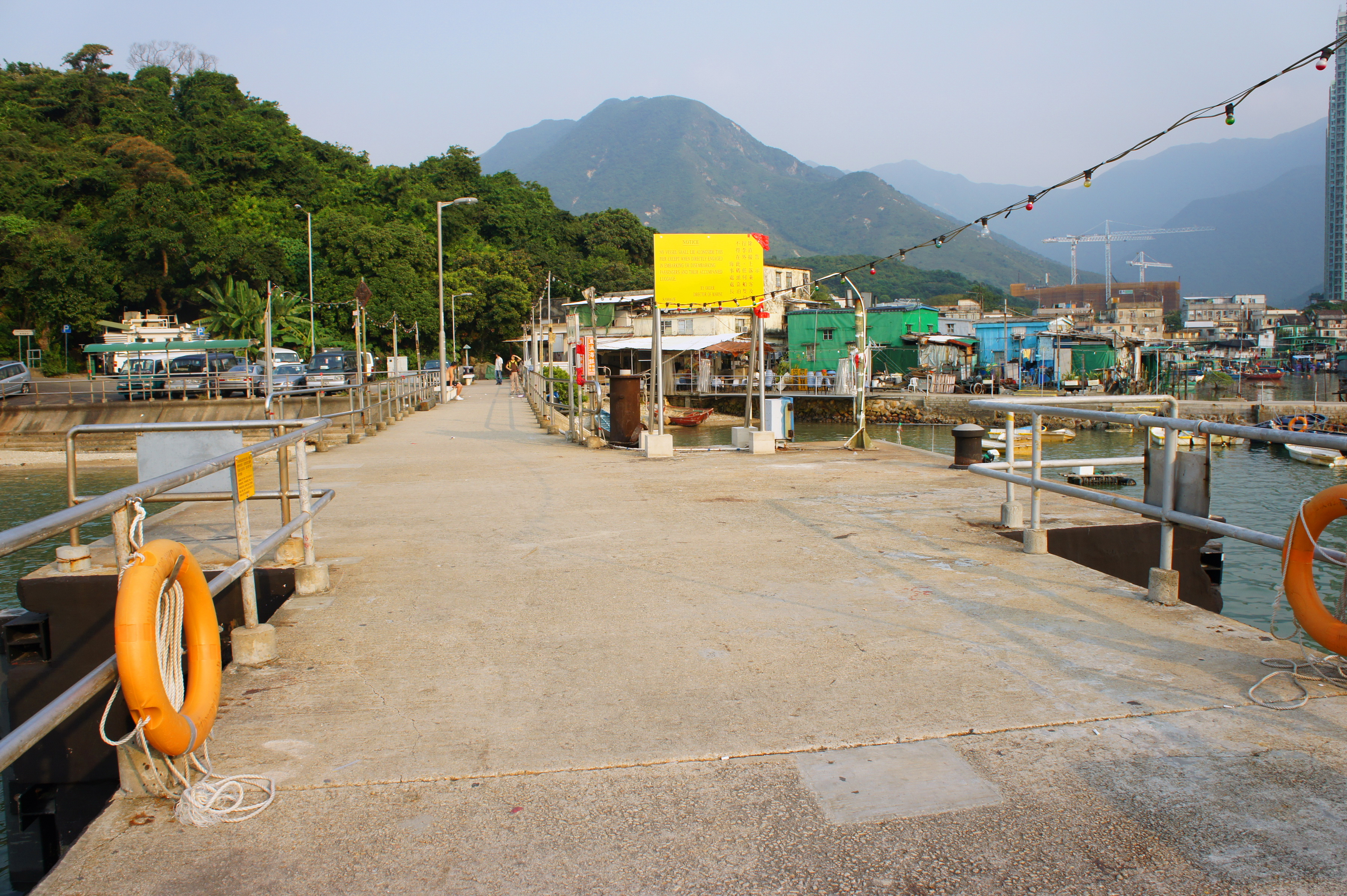
Tung Chung Old Ferry Pier in Ma Wan Chung.

Ma Wan Chung (Chinese: 馬灣涌) is a village in Tung Chung on Lantau Island, Hong Kong. It is located on the southeastern coast of Tung Chung Bay.

== Administration ==
Ma Wan Chung is a recognized village under the New Territories Small House Policy.

== See also ==
- Chek Lap Kok
- Ma Wan (Tung Chung)
- Tung Chung Battery
- Tung Chung Development Pier
- Yat Tung Estate
