= Wong Nai Uk =

Coordinates: 22.284199°N 113.937212°E

Wong Nai Uk, also transliterated as Wong Nei Uk (Chinese: 黃泥屋) is a village in Tung Chung on Lantau Island, Hong Kong.

== Administration ==
Wong Nei Uk Tau is a recognized village under the New Territories Small House Policy.

== See also ==
- Ma Wan (Tung Chung)
