= Sheung Ling Pei =

Village in Hong Kong

Coordinates: 22.278256°N 113.937143°E

Sheung Ling Pei (Chinese: 上嶺皮) is a village in Tung Chung on Lantau Island, Hong Kong.

== Administration ==
Sheung Ling Pei is a recognized village under the New Territories Small House Policy.

== History ==
Sheung Ling Pei borders the Tung Chung Fort, which was originally built in the 12th century. It has been reported that people of the village have claimed that the fort was built on a site donated by the Ho clan of the village, and paid with the help of seventy taels of silver donated by the clan.

== See also ==
- Ha Ling Pei
- Wong Ka Wai
