= Tung Chung Development Pier =

Ferry pier in Hong Kong

Coordinates: 22.294202°N 113.940399°E

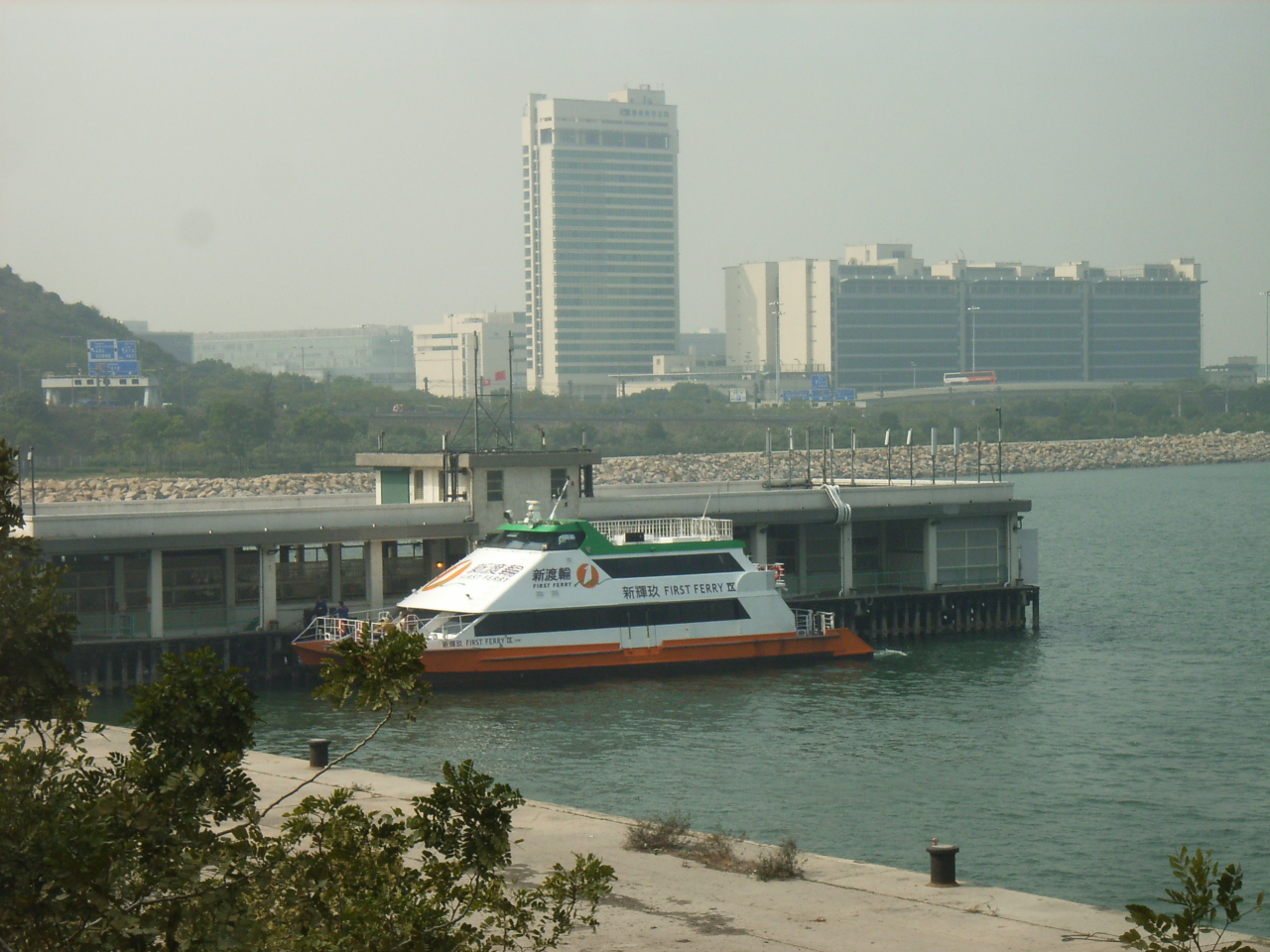
Tung Chung New Development Ferry Pier (East berth).

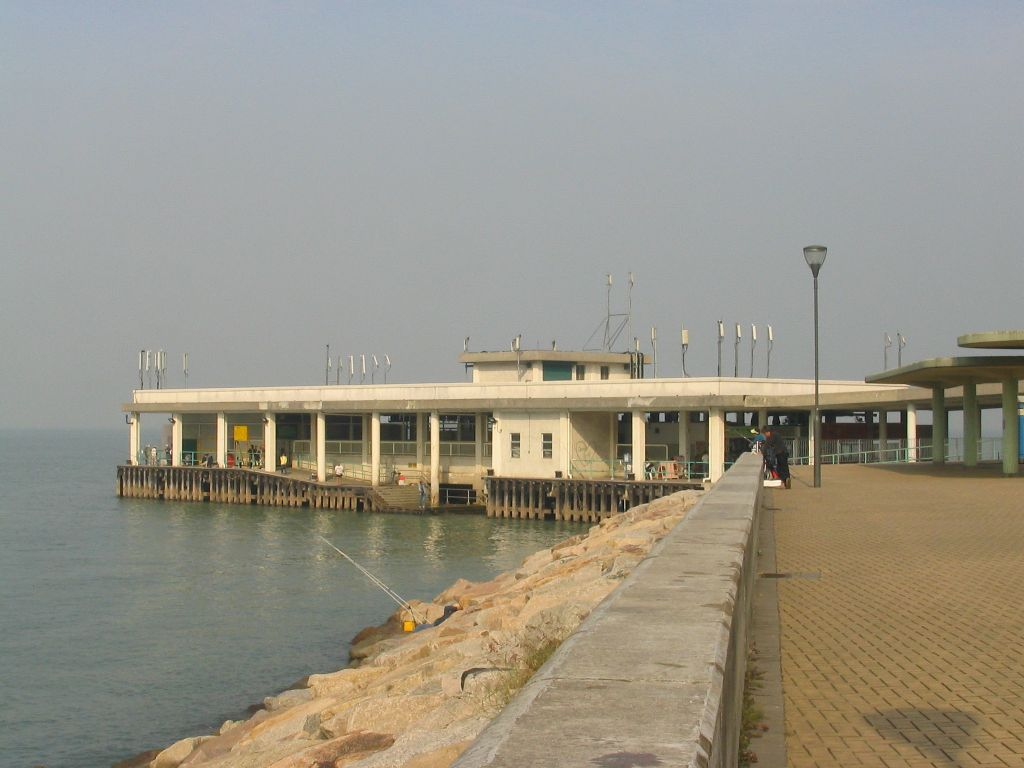
Tung Chung New Development Ferry Pier (West berth).

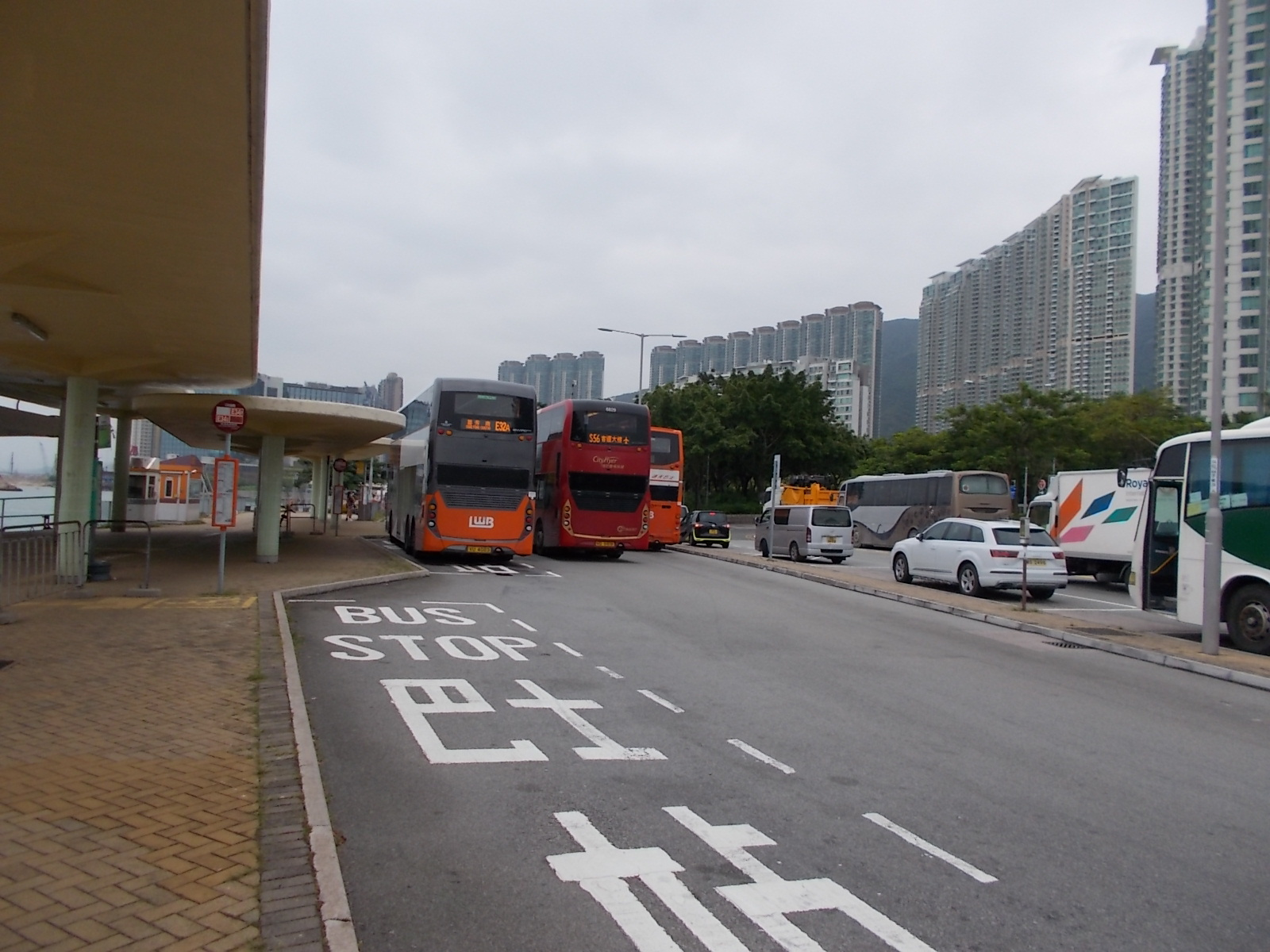
Tung Chung Ferry Bus Terminus next to Tung Chung Development Pier along Tung Chung Waterfront Road.

Tung Chung Development Pier (Chinese: 東涌發展碼頭) also known as Tung Chung New Development Ferry Pier (東涌新發展碼頭) and Tung Chung New Ferry Pier (東涌新碼頭) is a ferry pier in Tung Chung Waterfront Road (東涌海濱路), Tung Chung, Lantau Island, New Territories, Hong Kong. It was built to replace Tung Chung Old Ferry Pier that is located further west, in Ma Wan Chung (馬灣涌).

== Ferry service ==
=== East Berth ===
The former ferry service between Tuen Mun and Tung Chung New Development Ferry Pier (East Berth), operated by New World First Ferry (now known as Sun Ferry), ceased operation on 1 July 2008. It was replaced by KMB bus route E33P between Tuen Mun and the airport via Tung Chung.

=== West Berth ===
There is a ferry service between Tuen Mun and Tai O, via Tung Chung New Development Ferry Pier (West Berth) and Sha Lo Wan, operated by Fortune Ferry.
