= Ma Wan (Tung Chung) =

Coordinates: 22.27962°N 113.94118°E

Ma Wan New Village
- Interactive map of Ma Wan New Village

Ma Wan New Village (Chinese: 馬灣新村) is a village in Tung Chung, Lantau Island, Hong Kong. It is the resettlement village of the former nearby Ma Wan Village (馬灣村).

== Administration ==
Ma Wan is a recognized village under the New Territories Small House Policy.

== See also ==
- Ma Wan Chung
- Pa Mei, adjacent to Ma Wan New Village
- Wong Nai Uk
