= Shan Ha =

Shan Ha is the name or part of the name of several places in Hong Kong:

- Shan Ha (Pa Mei), a village in Tung Chung, on Lantau Island
- Shan Ha Tsuen, a village in Yuen Long District
- Tsang Tai Uk, also known as Shan Ha Wai, a walled village in Sha Tin District
- Wang Toi Shan Ha San Uk Tsuen, a village in Yuen Long District
