= Wong Ka Wai (Tung Chung) =

Coordinates: 22.276905°N 113.934203°E

- Traditional Chinese: 黃家圍
- Simplified Chinese: 黄家围
Transcriptions
Standard Mandarin
- Hanyu Pinyin: Huáng Jiāwéi

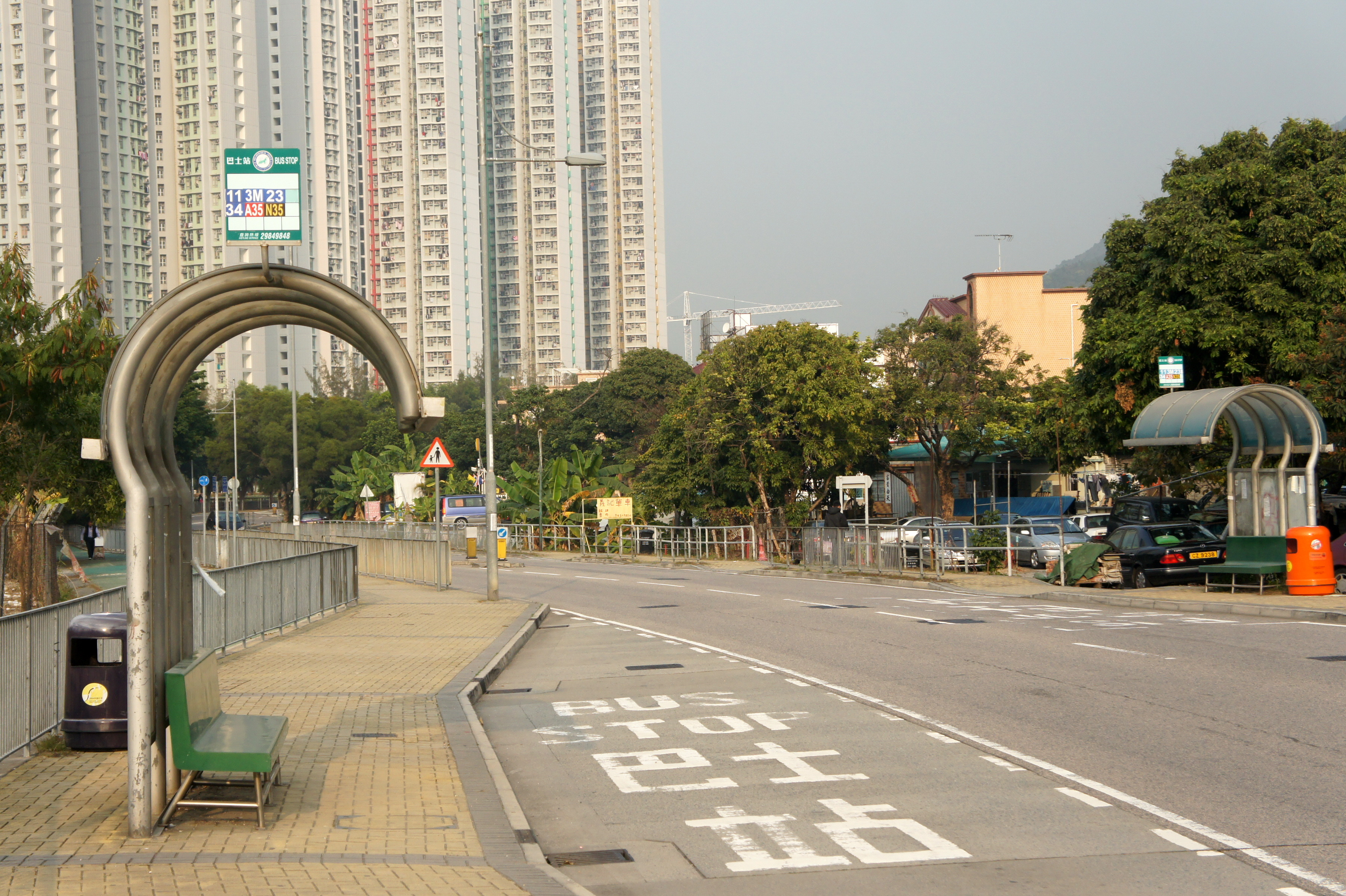
Tung Chung Road near Wong Ka Wai.

Wong Ka Wai (Chinese: 黃家圍) is a village in Tung Chung on Lantau Island, Hong Kong.

== Administration ==
Wong Ka Wai is a recognized village under the New Territories Small House Policy.

== See also ==
- Ha Ling Pei
- Sheung Ling Pei
