= Ha Ling Pei =

Village of Hong Kong

Coordinates: 22.277891°N 113.935219°E

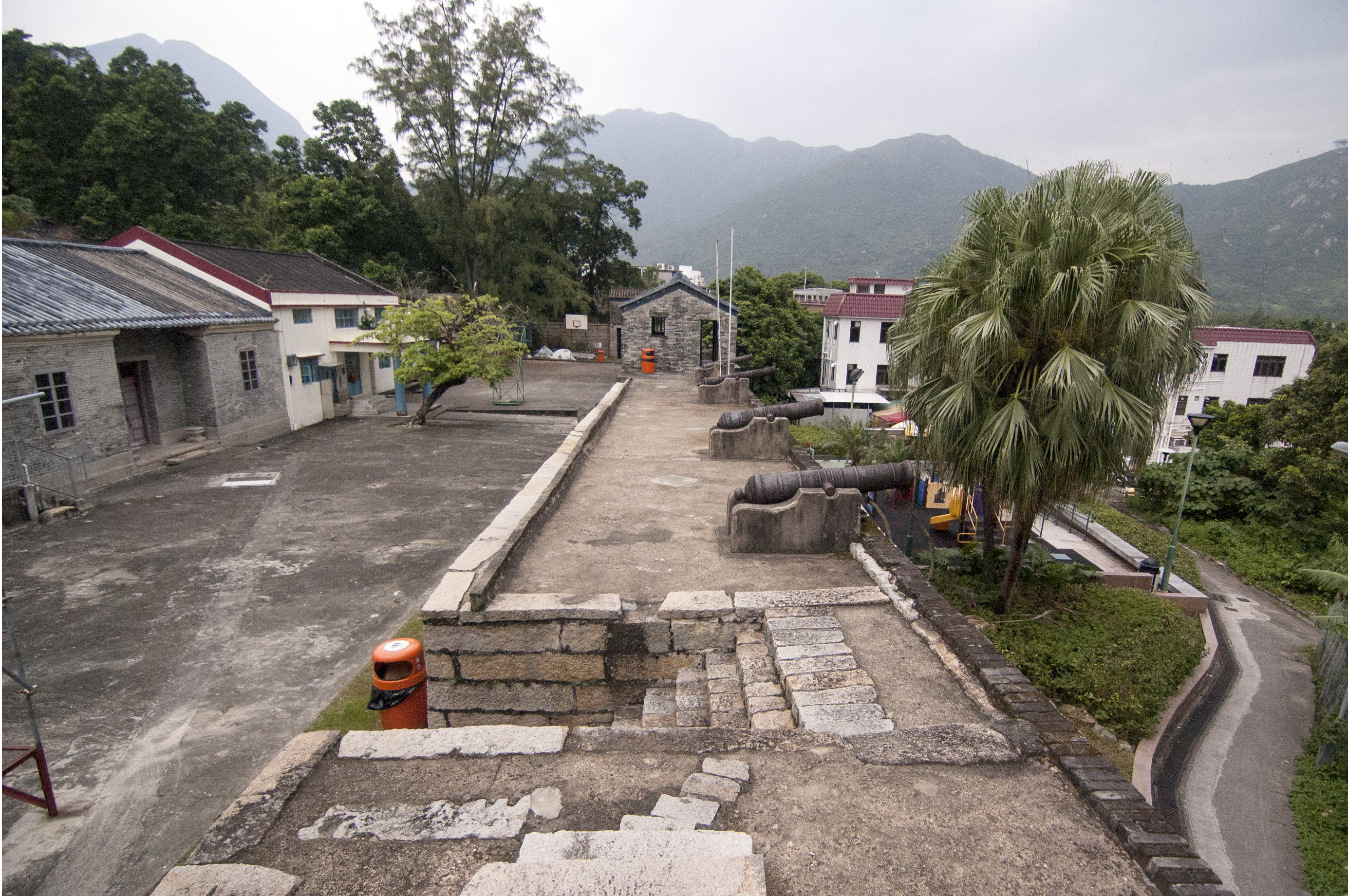
Tung Chung Fort and Ha Ling Pei (right).

Ha Ling Pei (Chinese: 下嶺皮) is a village in Tung Chung on Lantau Island, Hong Kong.

== Administration ==
Ha Ling Pei is a recognized village under the New Territories Small House Policy.

== See also ==
- Tung Chung Fort
- Adjacent villages: Sheung Ling Pei and Wong Ka Wai
