= Tung Chung Fort =

Coordinates: 22.2779°N 113.9356°E

- 東涌古城 (Chinese); 東涌堡 (Chinese); 東涌炮台 (Chinese)
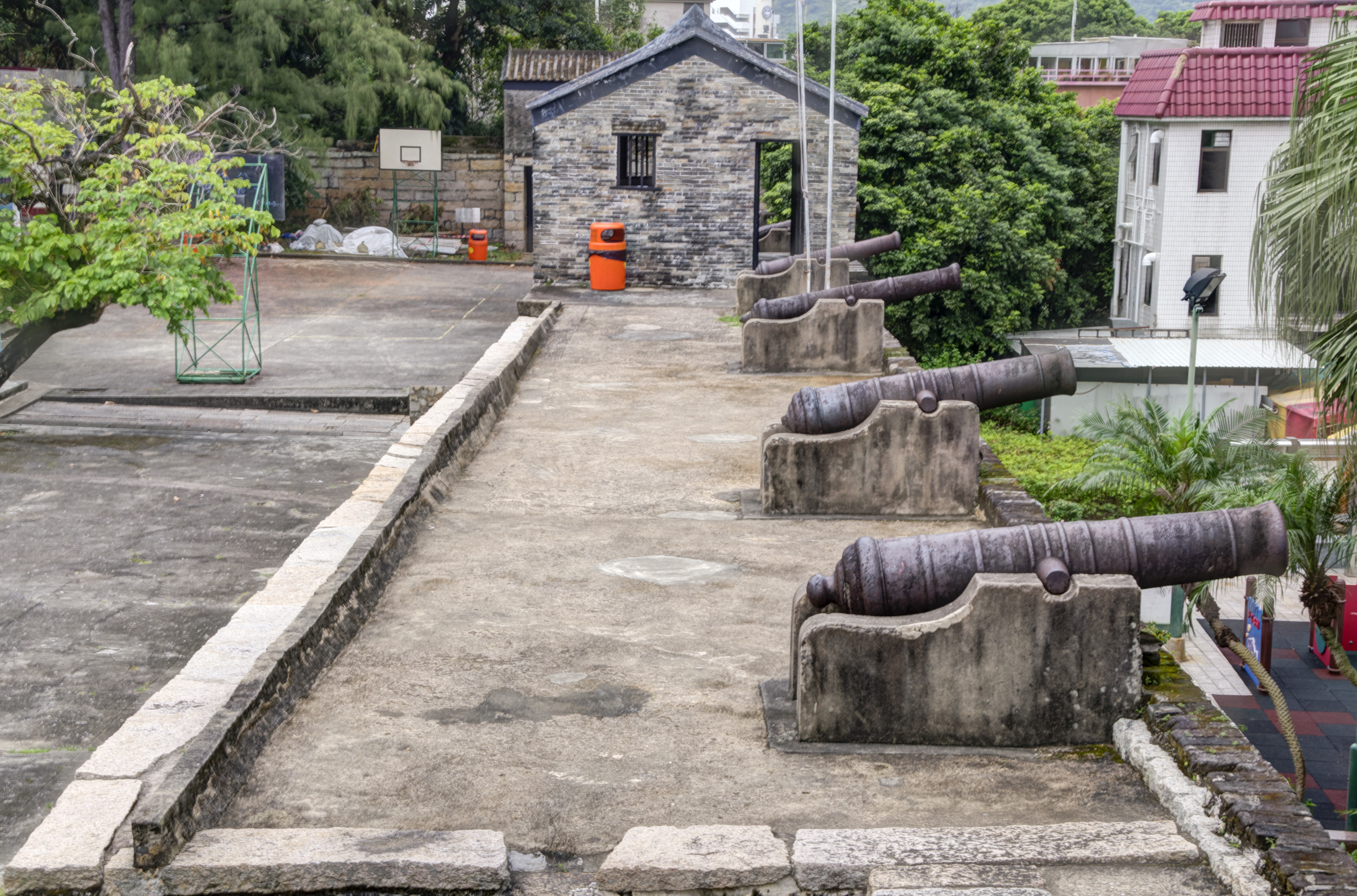
- Tung Chung Fort

- Location within Hong Kong
- Location: Lantau Island, Hong Kong

History
- Built: Shun Hei era

Declared Monument of Hong Kong
- Designated: 24 August 1979
- Reference no.: 7

Tung Chung Fort
- Traditional Chinese: 東涌炮台
- Simplified Chinese: 东涌炮台
Transcriptions
Standard Mandarin
- Hanyu Pinyin: Dōngchōng Pàotái
Yue: Cantonese
- Yale Romanization: Dūng chūng paau tòih
- Jyutping: Dung1 cung1 paau3 toi4

Alternative Chinese name
- Traditional Chinese: 東涌所城
- Simplified Chinese: 东涌所城
Transcriptions
Standard Mandarin
- Hanyu Pinyin: Dōngchōng Suǒchéng
Yue: Cantonese
- Yale Romanization: Dūng chūng só sìhng
- Jyutping: Dung1 cung1 so2 sing4

Second alternative Chinese name
- Traditional Chinese: 東涌寨城
- Simplified Chinese: 东涌寨城
Transcriptions
Standard Mandarin
- Hanyu Pinyin: Dōngchōng Zhàichéng
Yue: Cantonese
- Yale Romanization: Dūng chūng jaaih sìhng
- Jyutping: Dung1 cung1 zaai6 sing4

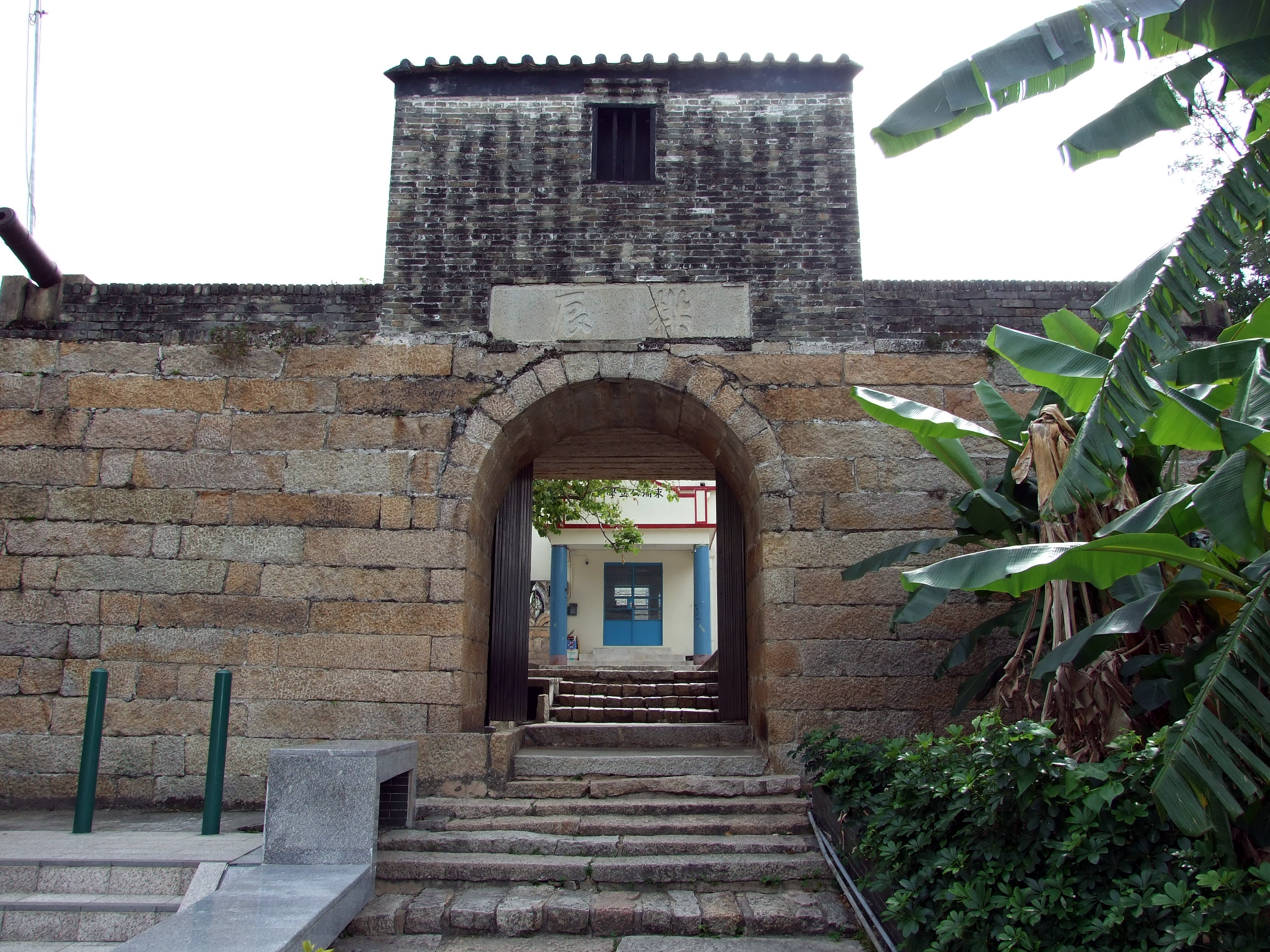
Entrance gate of Tung Chung Fort

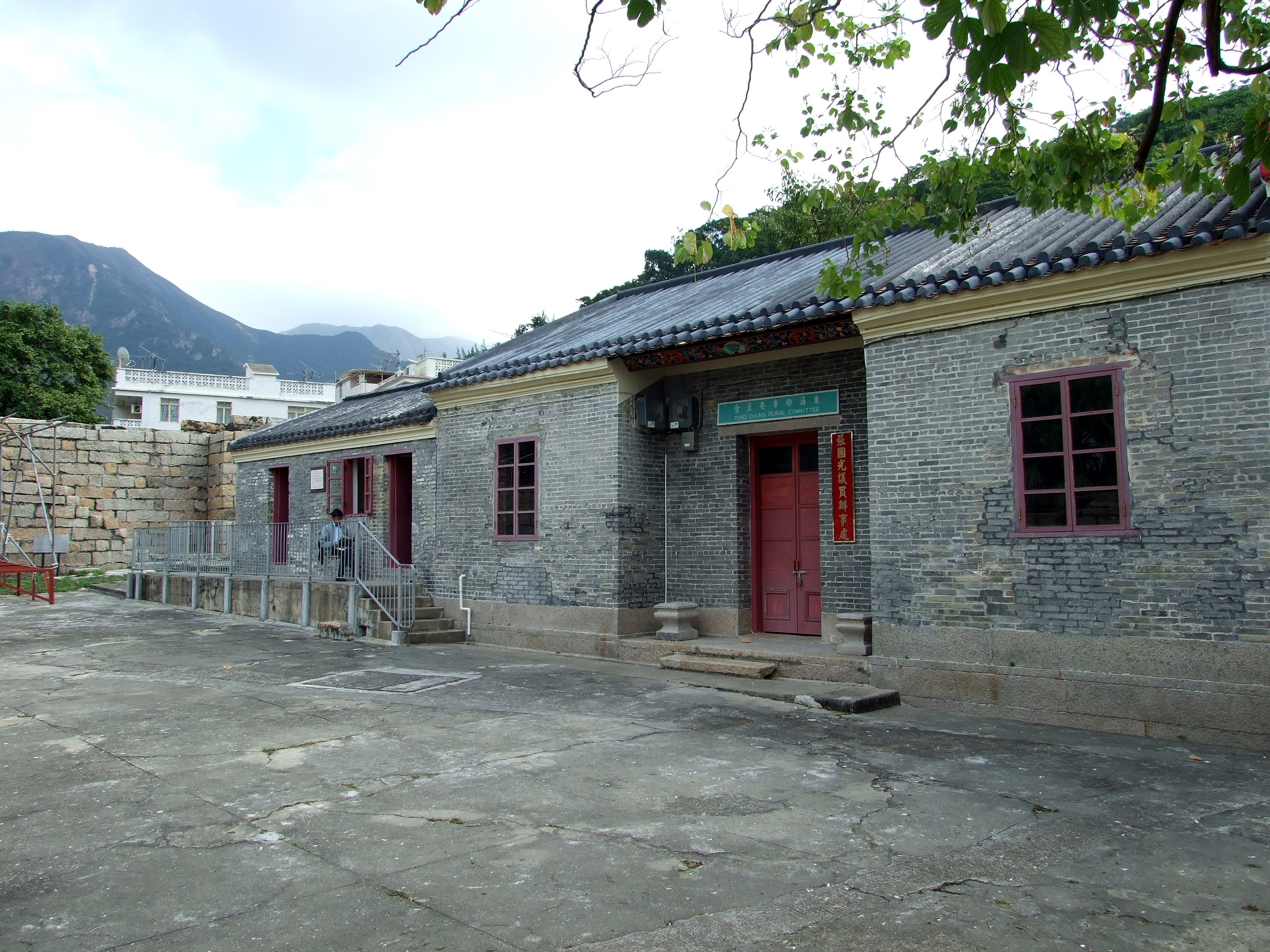
Tung Chung Rural Committee Office and exhibition hall within Tung Chung Fort

Tung Chung Fort is a fort located near Tung Chung, on Lantau Island, in Hong Kong. Close to Tung Chung Road, the fort is surrounded by the villages of Sheung Ling Pei (上嶺皮) and Ha Ling Pei (下嶺皮). It has a companion Tung Chung Battery on the coast.

== History ==
Tung Chung Fort was originally built in the Shun Hei era (淳熙, 1174–1189) of the Southern Song dynasty. Smugglers on Lantau Island smuggled salt from the island to Canton City and attacked the government of the city. The government sent a navy led by King Leok Chin (經略錢) to fight against the smugglers. Three hundred soldiers were stationed in Tung Chung and built the Tung Chung Fort. After three years of peace, the soldiers were called back and 150 of them were transferred to build Kowloon Walled City, in which they later stayed.

During the Qing dynasty, many pirates, including the well known Cheung Po Tsai, chose the bay of Tung Chung as their base and made use of the fort. The Qing Government recovered the fort after the surrender of Cheung Po Tsai. In 1832 (or 1817 alternatively) the fort was rebuilt and garrisoned by the Right Battalion of Tai Peng to defend the coast from pirates until the lease of New Territories to Britain in 1898. The fort was then abandoned.

During World War II, the Imperial Japanese Army occupied the fort.

Tung Chung Fort went through several transformations later. It served as a police station and then as Wa Ying College. In 2003 the Tung Chung Public Primary School (東涌公立學校), which was located in Tung Chung Fort, ceased operations. Now, it is the base for the Rural Committee Office.

In 1979, it was declared a monument and was refurbished in 1988.

== Features ==
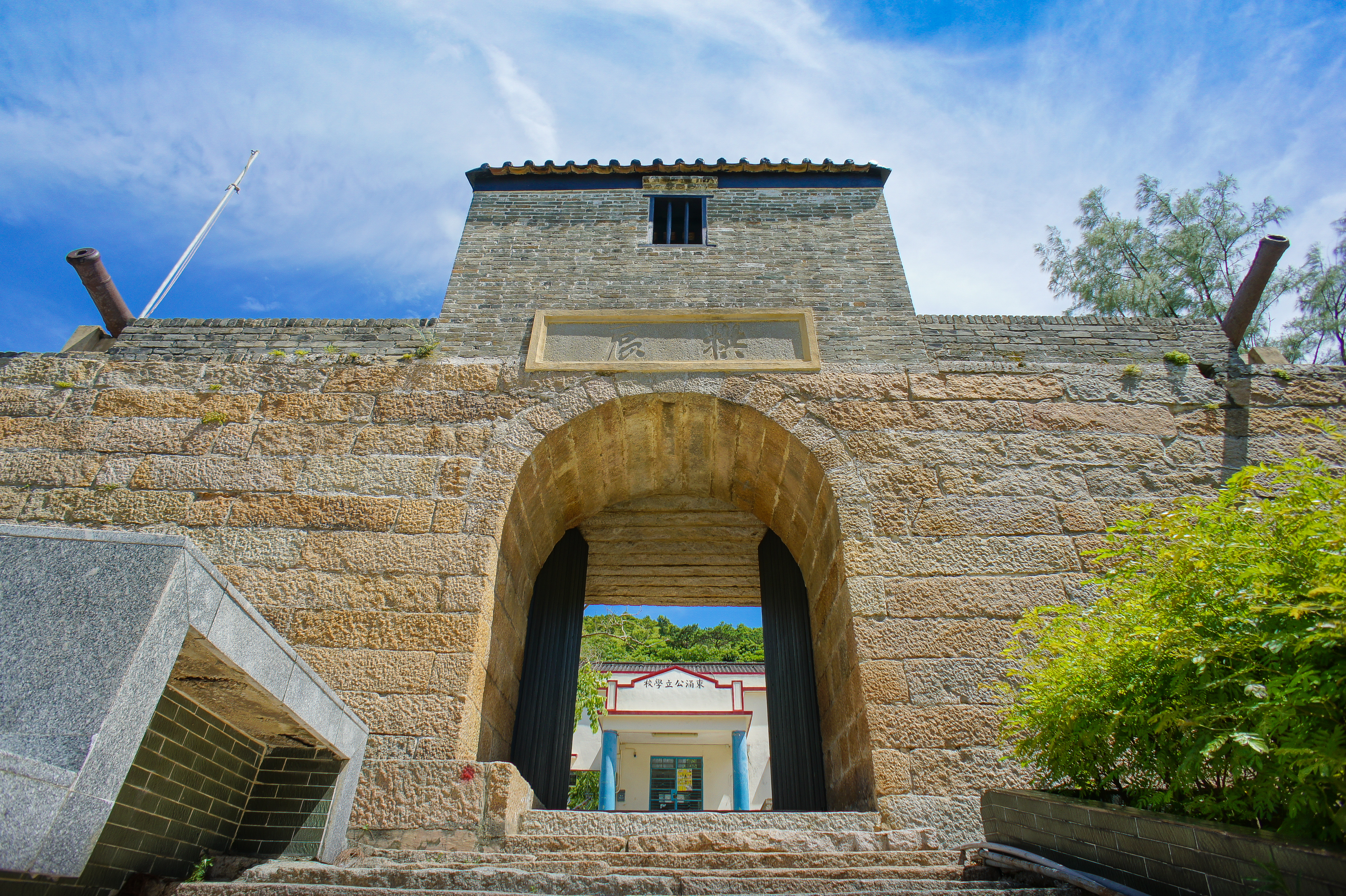
North gate

There are six still intact old muzzle-loading cannons, each resting on a cement base with enclosures made of granite blocks, which measure 70 by 80 metres (230 by 260 ft). Three arched gateways, each engraved with a Chinese inscription, are spaced along the walls.

== Transportation ==
The fort can be reached from Mui Wo (Silvermine Bay) bus terminal by taking the no. 3 bus to the Tung Chung terminus and about a half mile walk from the bus stop in the direction of the fort. The fort can also be reached by taking the no. 13 or 14 bus and MTR. Permission is required to drive into the park.

== See also ==
- Tung Chung Battery
- List of buildings and structures in Hong Kong
- List of forts
