= Pa Mei =

Village in Tung Chung, Hong Kong

Coordinates: 22.278504°N 113.942293°E

Shan Ha (Chinese: 山下), also referred to as Shan Ha (Pa Mei) (山下(壩尾)), Pa Mei New Village (壩尾新村) or simply Pa Mei (壩尾) is a village in Tung Chung on Lantau Island, Hong Kong.

== Administration ==
Shan Ha (Pa Mei) (山下(壩尾)) is a recognized village under the New Territories Small House Policy.

== History ==
At the time of the 1911 census, the population of Pa Mei was 46. The number of males was 27.

== See also ==
- Ma Wan New Village, adjacent to Shan Ha
