= Tung Chung Bay =

Bay in Hong Kong

Coordinates: 22.285609°N 113.929814°E

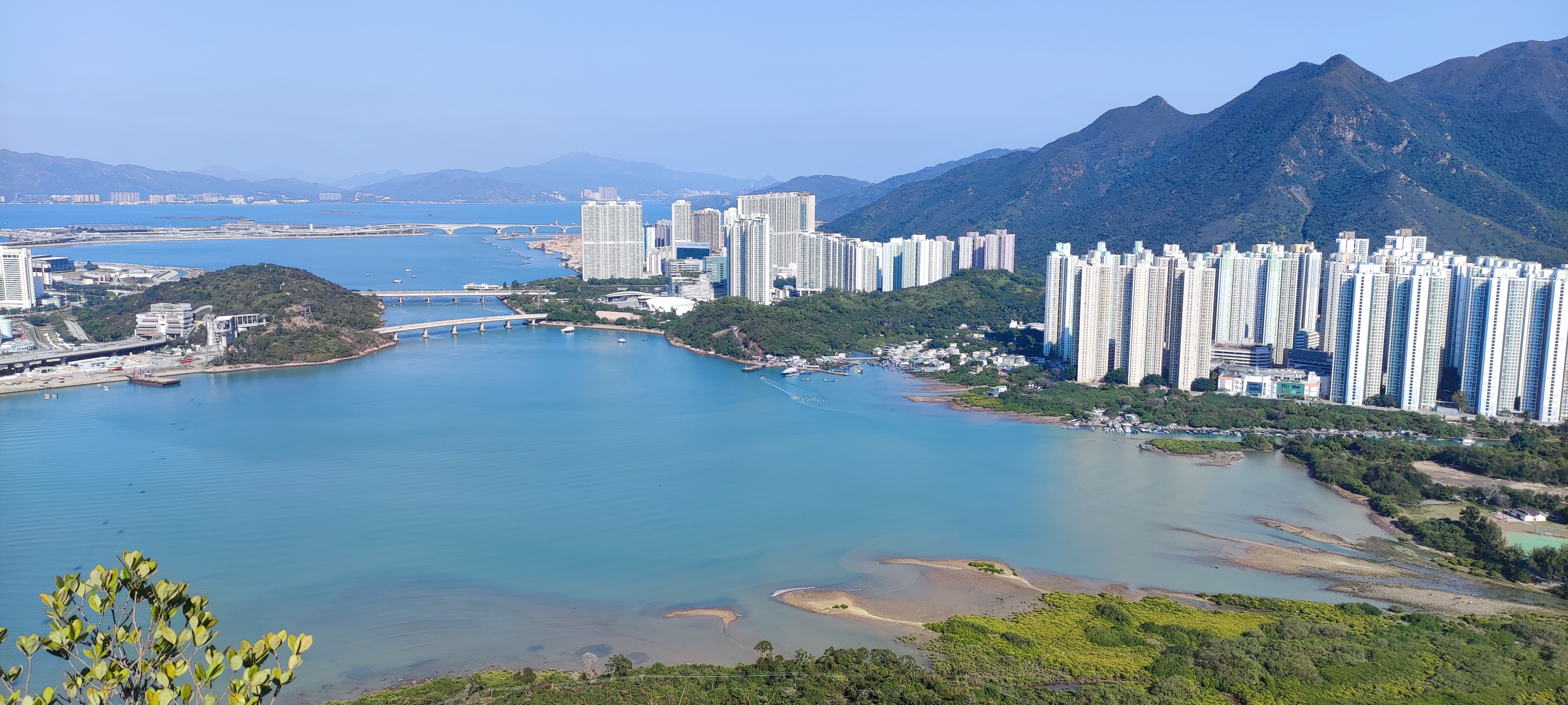
Tung Chung Bay and Tung Chung New Town viewed from west.

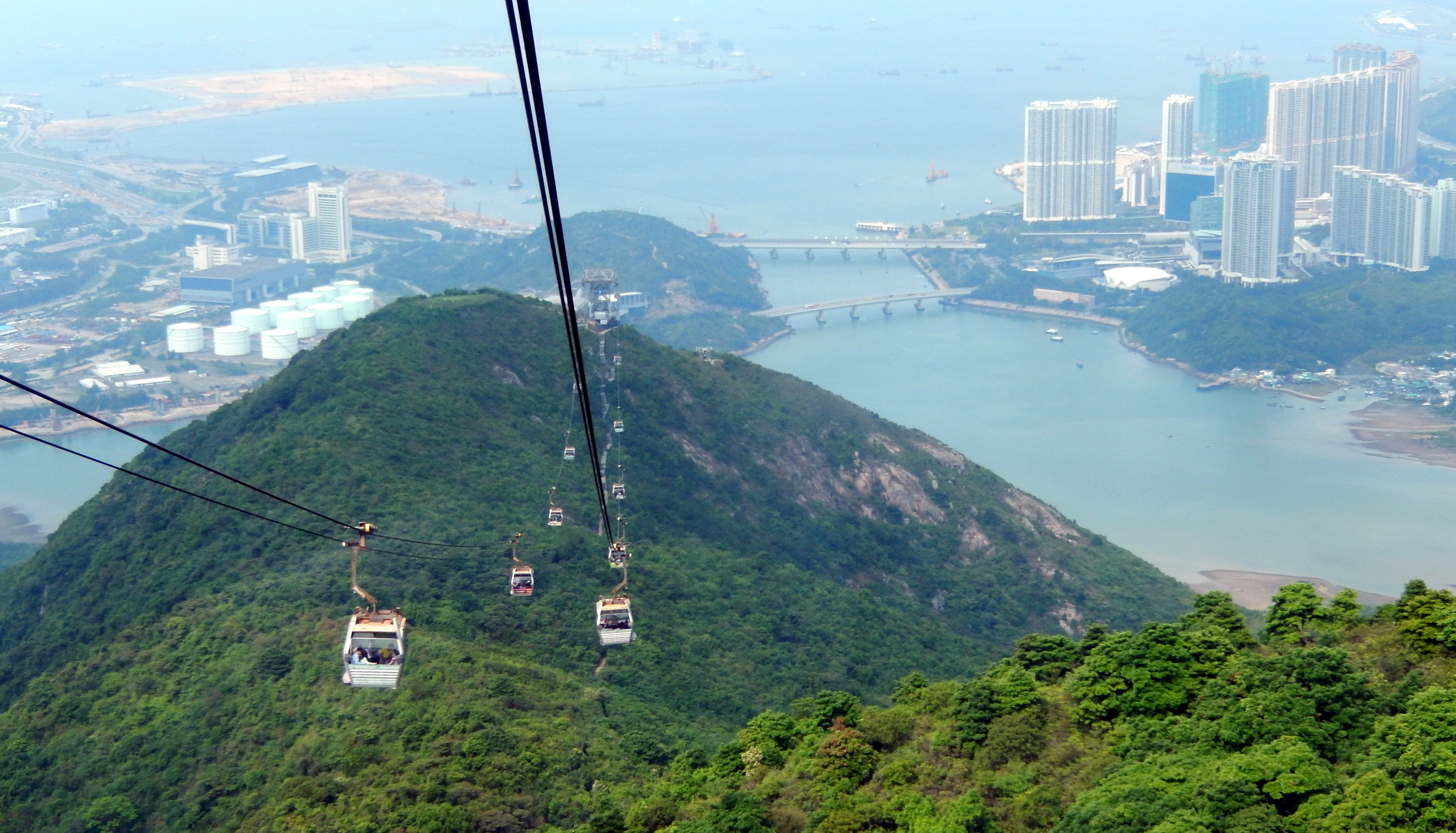
Tung Chung Bay viewed from Ngong Ping 360 cable car.

Tung Chung Bay (Chinese: 東涌灣) is a bay west of Tung Chung, Lantau Island, Hong Kong, near North Lantau New Town and Hong Kong International Airport. It is also the location of Old Tung Chung Pier.

The bay flows out to South China Sea channel between Chek Lap Kok and to Tung Wan from a smaller to the east.

The east side the bay is flanked by housing estates, while a forested area on the west side and an airport to the north.

== Features ==
- Hau Wong Temple - south end of bay
- Ma Wan Chung Village - southeast end of bay
- Ngong Ping 360
- San Tau Beach Site of Special Scientific Interest (SSSI)
- Tung Chung Battery
- Tung Chung Ma Wan Chung Pier
- Tung O Ancient Trail - hiking trail on southwest side of the bay

== See also ==
- Blockade of Tung Chung Bay (1809)
