= Tung Chung Battery =

Coordinates: 22.287314°N 113.935478°E

- 東涌小炮台 (Chinese)
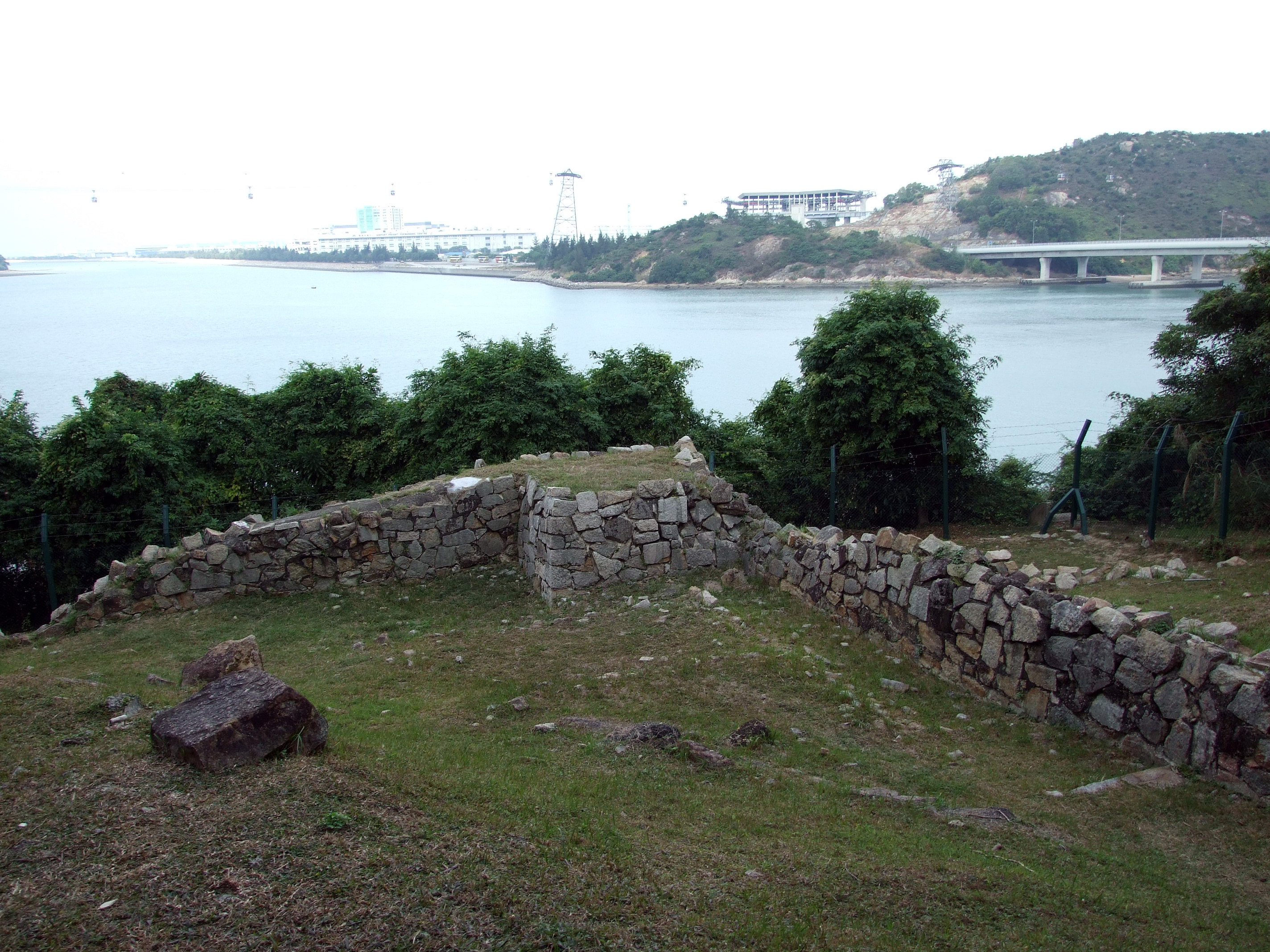
- Tung Chung Battery
- Interactive map of Tung Chung Battery
- Location: Lantau Island, Hong Kong

History
- Built: 1817; 209 years ago

Declared Monument of Hong Kong
- Designated: 11 November 1983; 42 years ago
- Reference no.: 22

Tung Chung Battery
- Traditional Chinese: 東涌小炮台
- Simplified Chinese: 东涌小炮台
Transcriptions
Standard Mandarin
- Hanyu Pinyin: Dōngchōng Xiǎo Pàotái
Yue: Cantonese
- Yale Romanization: Dūng chūng síu paau tòih
- Jyutping: Dung1 cung1 siu2 paau3 toi4

Tung Chung Battery is a former artillery battery located on Lantau Island in Hong Kong. Named after the eponymous district it is situated in, it was built in 1817, twenty-four years before the British took possession of Hong Kong. It was rediscovered in 1980 and is a declared monument of Hong Kong.

== History ==
Construction of the Tung Chung Battery was completed in 1817. Located a kilometre north of the Tung Chung Fort, its purpose was to protect Tung Chung Bay from pirates that threatened the coasts and seas of southern China. At the time, China did not have a large navy, and thus, relied on the development of forts as an alternative way to defend its coast.

The coastal fortification consisted of two coastal artillery cannon emplacements that guarded the Bay, along with seven guard houses. The site of the battery was chosen because it was located on a cliff that overlooked the water. This provided excellent views of the sea and a clear vantage point in case of a potential naval attack.

The construction of the battery was recorded in the Guangdong Annals, which recounted how two forts were built at the base of the "Rocky Lion Hill"—the literal translation of Shek She (石師).

== Rediscovery ==
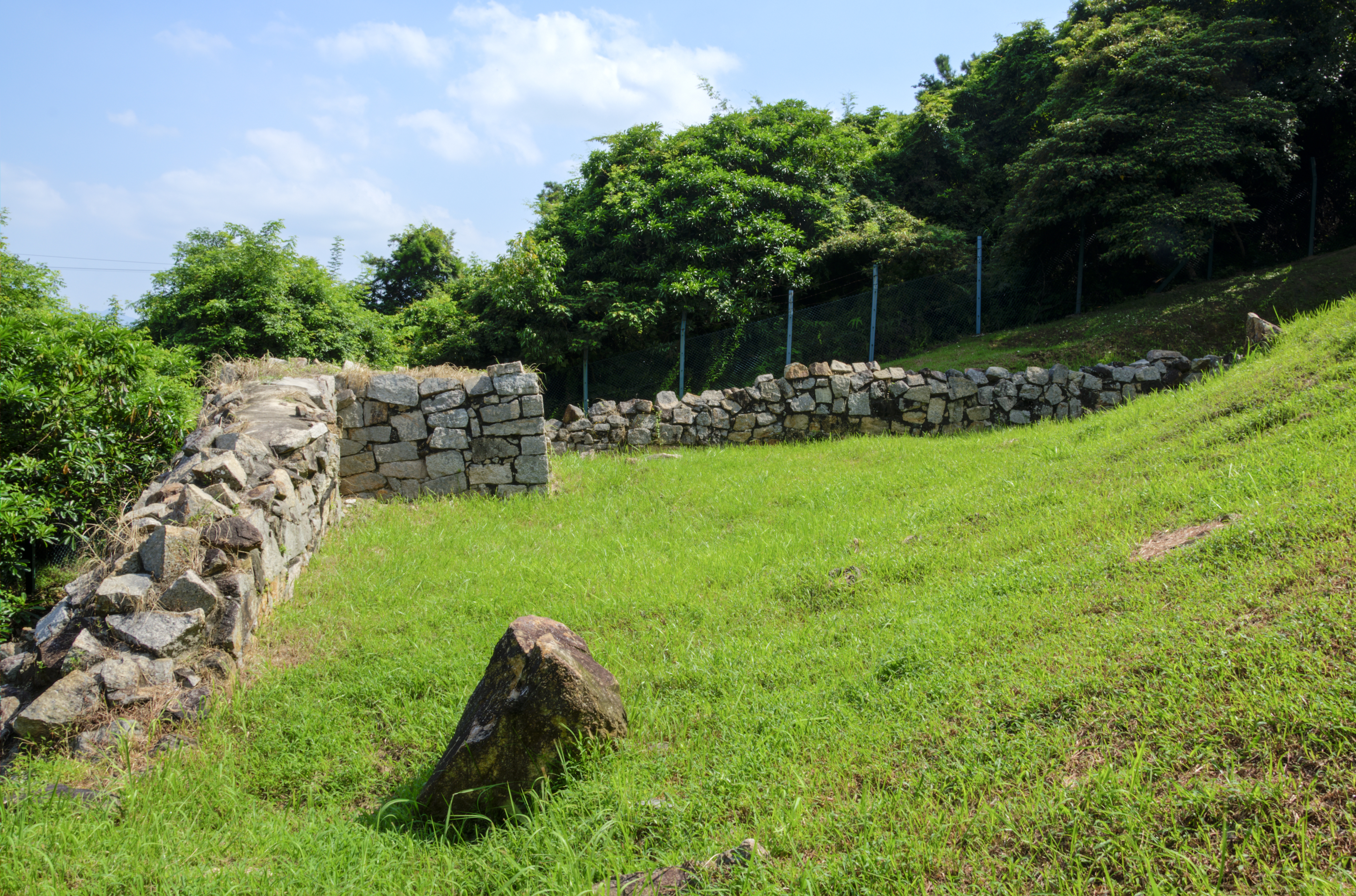
Tung Chung Battery in 2013

After having been buried underneath thick foliage for approximately a century, the battery was rediscovered in 1980. All that remained was an L-shaped wall that contained a corner platform; according to the Antiquities and Monuments Office (AMO), this was most likely utilized as a gun emplacement. After the discovery, the government undertook restoration work on the historic site. The battery was declared a monument on 11 November 1983. In November 1997, the site was included in the AMO's celebration tour of historic sites in North Lantau as part of the Year of Heritage. The festivities culminated in a traditional Cantonese opera performed at the Tung Chung Fort. Due to the amount of development that has taken place, the battery now faces towards Hong Kong International Airport, instead of Chek Lap Kok island and an open Tung Chung Bay as it used to.

== See also ==
- Military of Hong Kong
- Tung Chung Fort
