= Lantau Island =

Largest island in Hong Kong

- Lantau Island is highlighted in red.
- Interactive map of Lantau Island

Geography
- Location: Southwest Hong Kong
- Coordinates: 22°16′14″N 113°57′10″E
- Area: 147.16 km^{2} (56.82 sq mi)
- Highest elevation: 934 m (3064 ft)
- Highest point: Lantau Peak

Administration
- Hong Kong
- Districts: Islands District and Tsuen Wan District

Demographics
- Population: 105,000 (2011)

Lantau Island
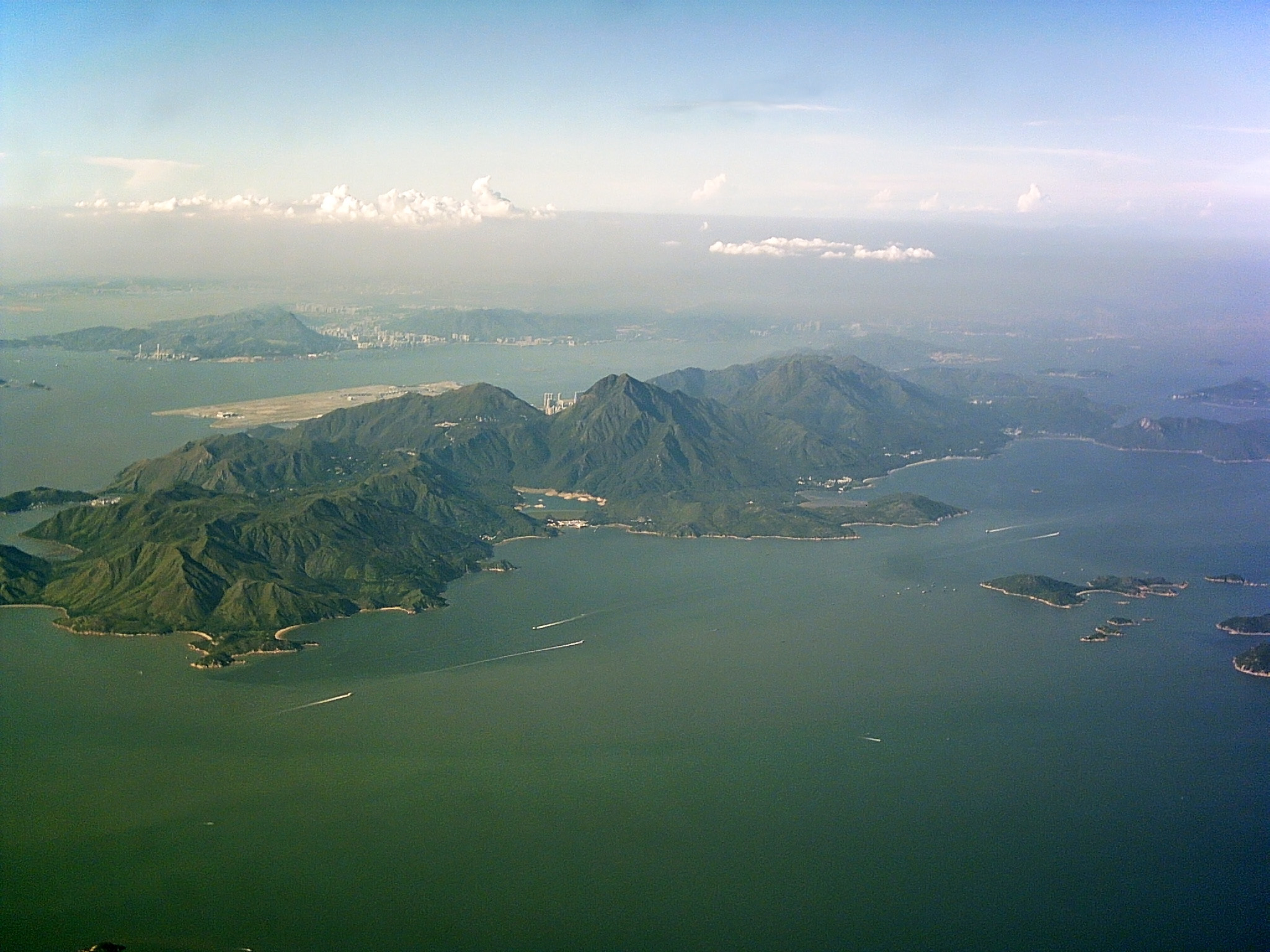
- Overall view of Lantau Island, seen from the southeast
- Traditional Chinese: 大嶼山
- Simplified Chinese: 大屿山
- Literal meaning: "big island mountain"
Transcriptions
Standard Mandarin
- Hanyu Pinyin: Dà yǔ shān
Hakka
- Romanization: Tai^{4} yi^{2} san^{1}
Yue: Cantonese
- Yale Romanization: Daaih yùh sāan
- Jyutping: Daai^{6} jyu^{4} saan^{1}

Lantau Island (also Lantao Island, Lan Tao or Lan Tau) is the largest island in Hong Kong. Located west of Hong Kong Island and the Kowloon Peninsula, it is part of the New Territories. Administratively, most of Lantau Island is part of the Islands District of Hong Kong. A small northeastern portion of the island is located in the Tsuen Wan District.

Originally an island with fishing villages, it has been developed since the late 20th century with the construction of Tung Chung New Town on its north-western coast and the completion of several major infrastructure projects, including Lantau Link (1997), Hong Kong International Airport (1998), Hong Kong Disneyland (2005), and the Ngong Ping 360 gondola lift (2006).

== Geography ==
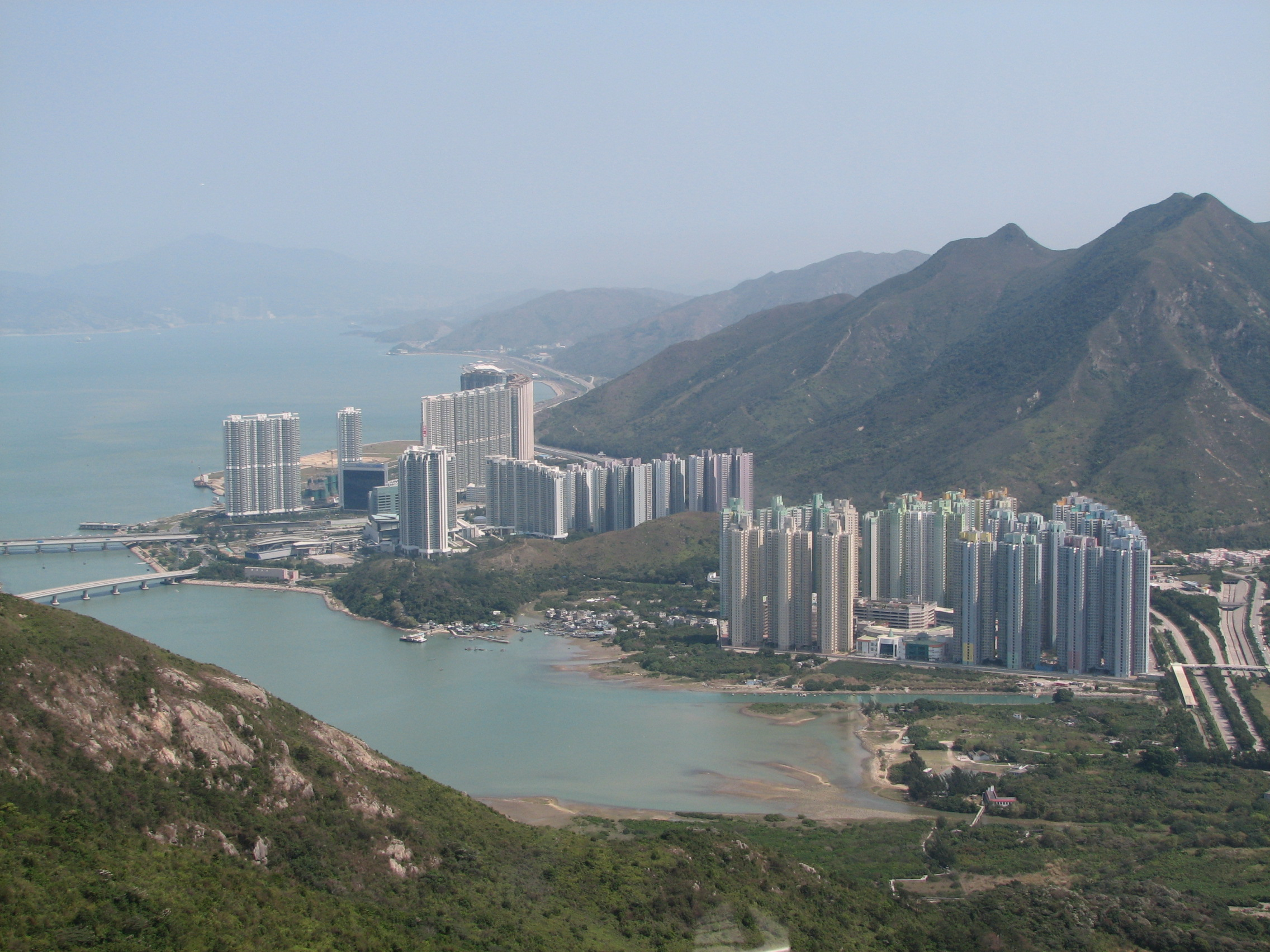
Tung Chung New Town and Tung Chung Bay seen from the Ngong Ping 360 cableway

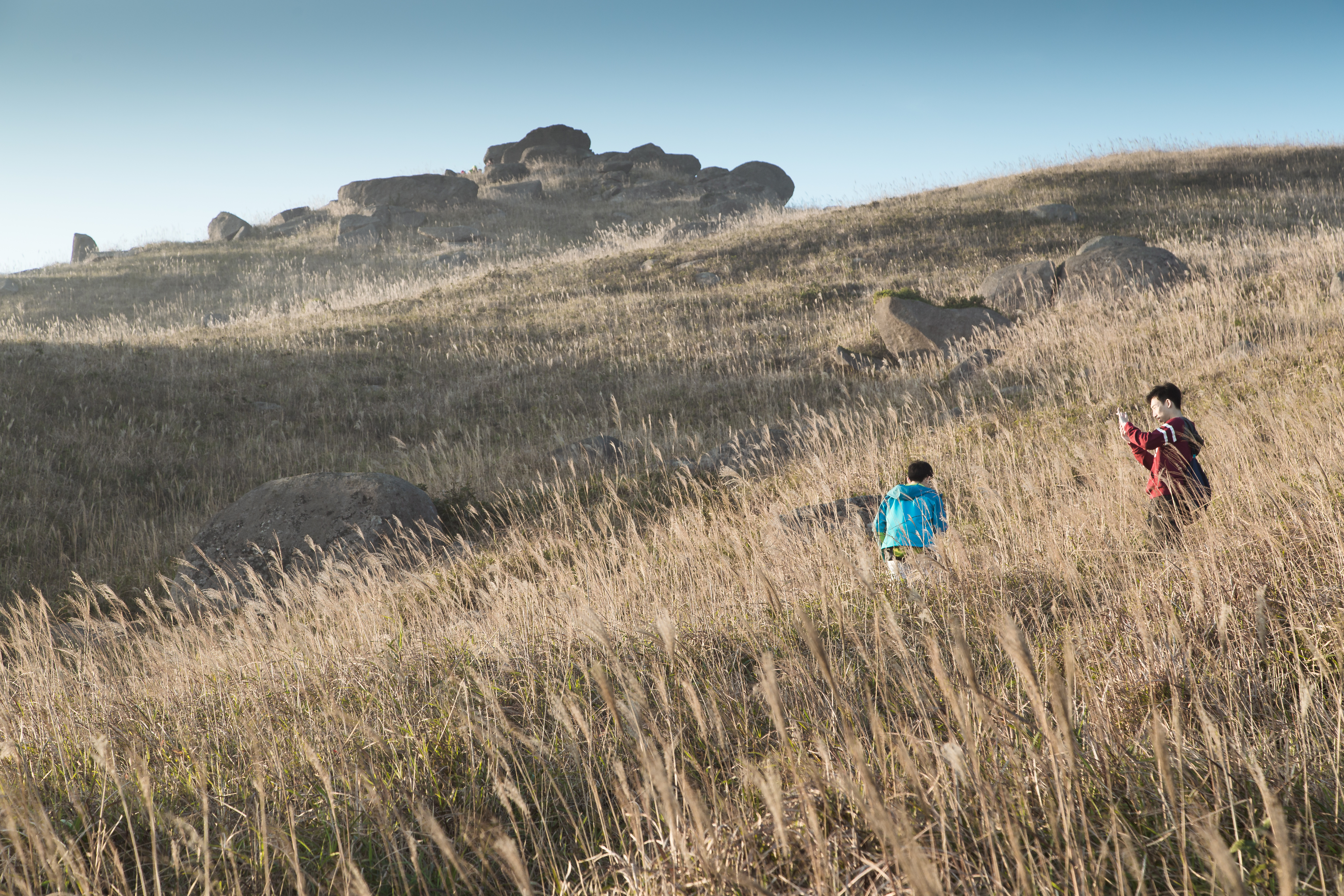
Miscanthus in Sunset Peak attract many people from November to January.

With a land mass of 147.16 square kilometres (56.82 sq mi), Lantau is the largest island in Hong Kong, almost twice the size of Hong Kong Island. Lantau Island primarily consists of mountainous terrain. Lantau Peak (934 metres (3,064 ft)) is the highest point of the island. It is the second highest peak in Hong Kong, after Tai Mo Shan, and is almost twice the height of Victoria Peak. Other mountains include Sunset Peak (Tai Tung Shan) at 869 m (2,851 ft), Lin Fa Shan at 766 m (2,513 ft), Nei Lak Shan at 751 m (2,464 ft) and Yi Tung Shan at 747 m (2,451 ft).

Lantau Island is often referred to as "the lungs of Hong Kong", because of its abundance of indigenous forest and relative scarcity of high-rise residential developments which characterise Hong Kong Island and Kowloon. The largest country park of Hong Kong, Lantau South Country Park is located on the island, which hosts two other parks, namely Lantau North Country Park and its extension. These parks cover slightly more than half of the area of Lantau Island.

Shek Pik Reservoir is the third largest freshwater reservoir in Hong Kong. Completed in 1963, it covers an area of 1.01 km^{2} (0.4 sq mi) and has a capacity of 24,500,000 m^{3} (865,209,000 cu ft).

Fan Lau Kok at the end of Fan Lau Peninsula is the southwest end of the territory of Hong Kong. The small island of Peaked Hill, off Tsin Yue Wan (煎魚灣), marks the westernmost point on the land of Hong Kong territories.

== Population ==
Lantau Island has relatively low population density. Settlements are scattered throughout the island and each has its own distinctive characteristics. The completion of the Hong Kong International Airport at Chek Lap Kok in 1998 has led to economic development in north-western Lantau; the once quiet village of Tung Chung became a new town and is now home to over 45,000 people located in 30 to 50 storey high-rise housing estates and condominiums located near the airport. The neighbouring Yat Tung Estate houses 37,273 people, primarily in public housing. Over the next few years, the population of the North Lantau New Town is expected to increase to a target population of over 200,000 across 7.6 km^{2} (2.9 sq mi) of reclaimed land stretching from Tung Chung to Tai Ho Wan.

=== Discovery Bay ===
Discovery Bay is a privately owned residential development located on the south-eastern coast of Lantau. The district has a population of 20,271 residents from over 30 different countries, giving it a reputation as an expatriate enclave.

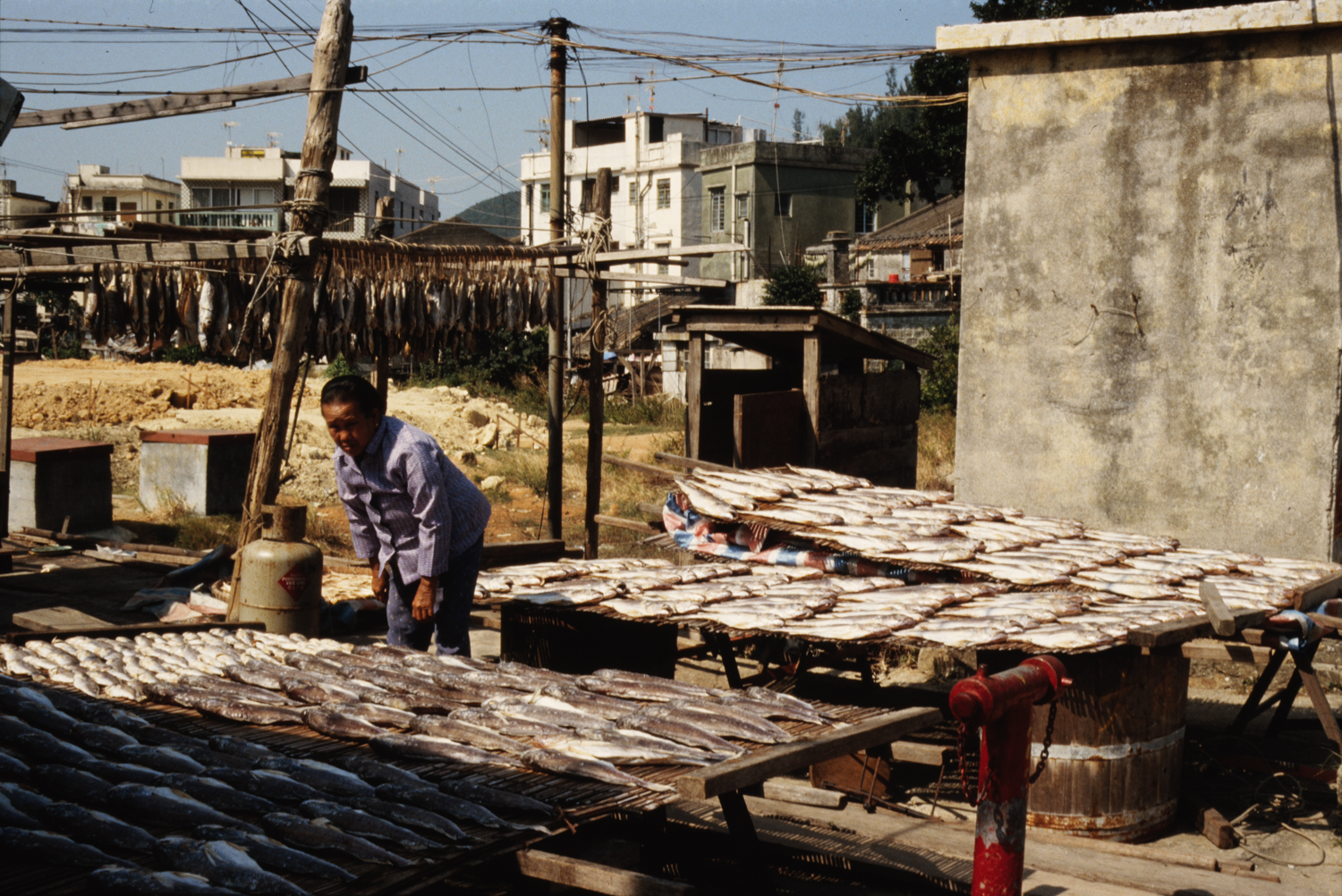
Drying fishes spread out on tables on the Lantau Island, Photographic slide by Joy Larkcom 1985

=== Villages ===
Other settlements include Mui Wo, Tai O, Tong Fuk, Sha Lo Wan villages, Pui O villages, Luk Keng Village, Nim Shue Wan Village, Pak Mong, San Shek Wan and The Sea Ranch.

== Etymology ==
Lantau Island
- Traditional Chinese: 爛頭
- Simplified Chinese: 烂头
- Cantonese Yale: Laahn tàuh
- Jyutping: laan6 tau4
- Literal meaning: Rotten Head
Transcriptions
Standard Mandarin
- Hanyu Pinyin: Làntóu
Yue: Cantonese
- Yale Romanization: Laahn tàuh
- Jyutping: laan6 tau4

The name Lantau Island is based on the old local name of Lantau Peak, (爛頭). Its Chinese name, 大嶼山, is sometimes romanized as Tai Yu Shan. The island has been historically known as Tai Hai Shan (大奚山), Tai Kai Shan (大溪山), Tai Yi Shan (大姨山), and Tuen Mun Island (屯門島).

== History ==
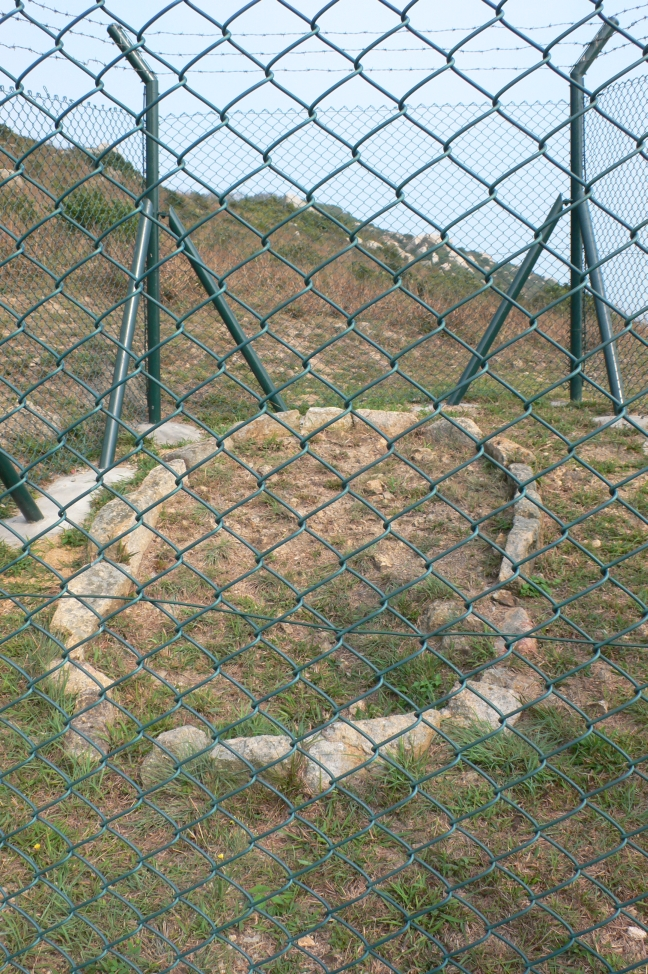
The stone circle located at Fan Lau

Early human artifacts have been discovered on the island. These include rock carvings at Shek Pik, which are thought to date back to the Bronze Age, and a stone circle at Fan Lau which is probably from the Neolithic Age. Both sites are located on the southwestern coast of the island.

The island was often shown in navigation maps because of its proximity to a major sea route in South China.

In 1276, the Southern Song dynasty court fled to Guangdong by boat to escape Mongol invaders, leaving Emperor Gong of Song behind. The resistance centred on two young princes, Emperor Gong's brothers. The older boy Zhao Shi, was declared emperor at the age of nine, ascending the throne as Emperor Duanzong of Song. In 1277, the imperial court sought refuge first in Silvermine Bay (Mui Wo) on Lantau Island (then known as Gangzhou (碙州), and later in today's Kowloon City. The older brother became ill, died, and was succeeded by the younger brother Zhao Bing (Emperor Bing of Song) at the age of seven. He died in 1279, and the Song dynasty ended. These emperors are also believed to have held court in the Tung Chung valley, which takes its name from a local hero who gave up his life for the emperor.

Lantau Island is likely among the first European trading settlements in the Pearl River area, established by Portuguese traders in the 1510s. The Portuguese called the settlement Tamão, but they later abandoned these settlements following their defeat by Chinese troops in the Battle of Tunmen and Battle of Xicaowan. Lantau was visited in 1607 by one of the early Dutch East India Company (VOC) fleet commanders Cornelis Matelieff de Jonge who describes his visit to the local mandarin. A drawing of this official's compound was published in the 1648 edition of Matelieff's travelogue. Much later the island became an important trading post for the British, long before they became interested in Hong Kong Island.

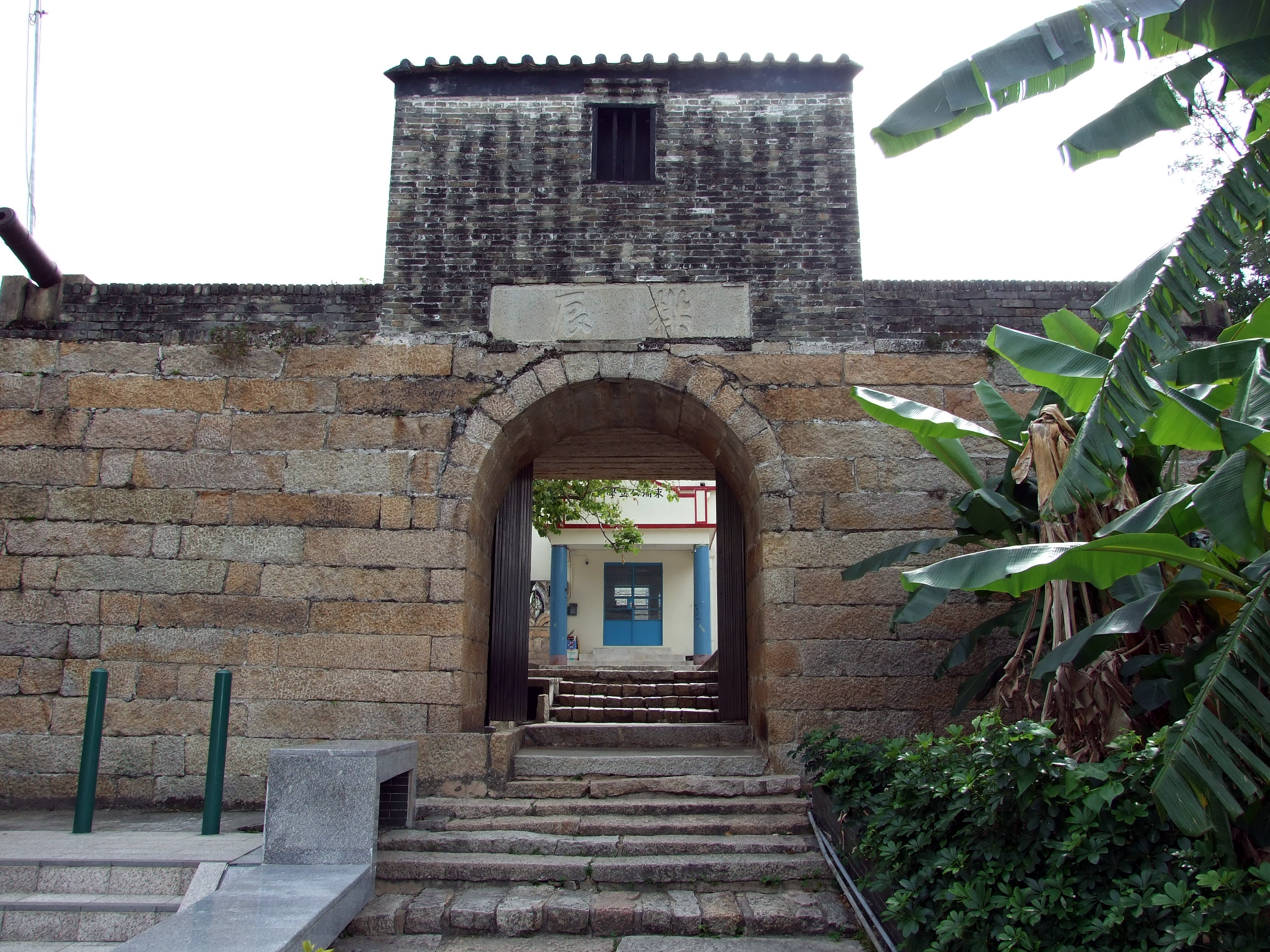
Entrance of Tung Chung Fort

There were nine settlements on the island in the early 16th century: Kai Kung Tau (鷄公頭), Shek Pik, Tai O, Sha Lo Wan, Tung Sai Chung (東西涌, now known as Tung Chung), Tai Ho Shan (大蠔山, now known as Lantau Peak), Mui Wo, Lo Pui O (now known as Pui O) and Tong Fuk. The island was evacuated for about a decade, following the orders imposed by the Great Clearance, and people were allowed to return to settle on the island in 1669. Five villages were subsequently resettled: Tai O, Tung Sai Chung, Lo Pui O, Shek Pik and Mui Wo.

Salt was illegally produced on Lantau Island. This was discovered by the Chinese rulers during the 16th century, and the local warlord put many islanders to death as a result.

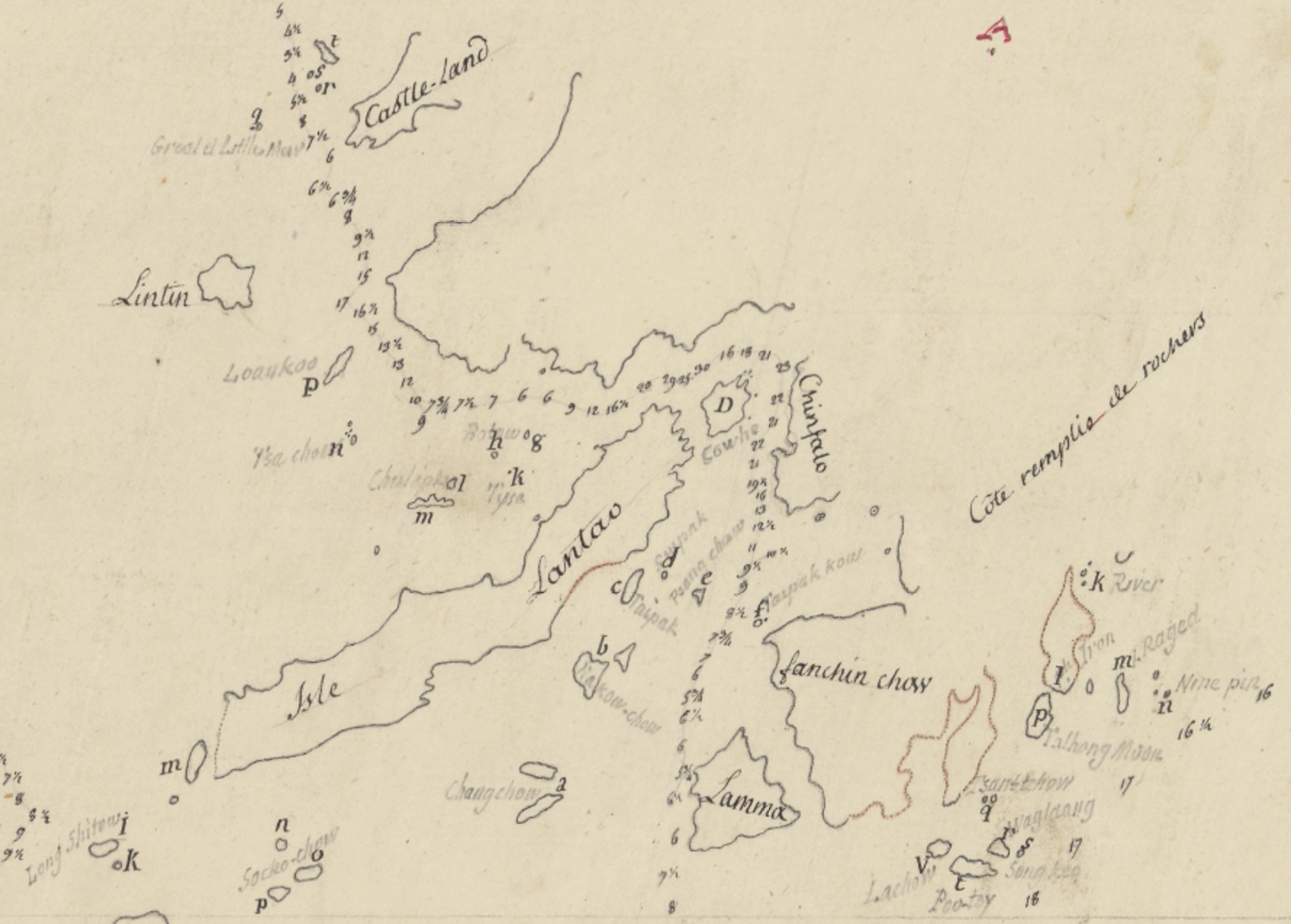
Hong Kong as charted by French sailors' observations in 1759 and 1760

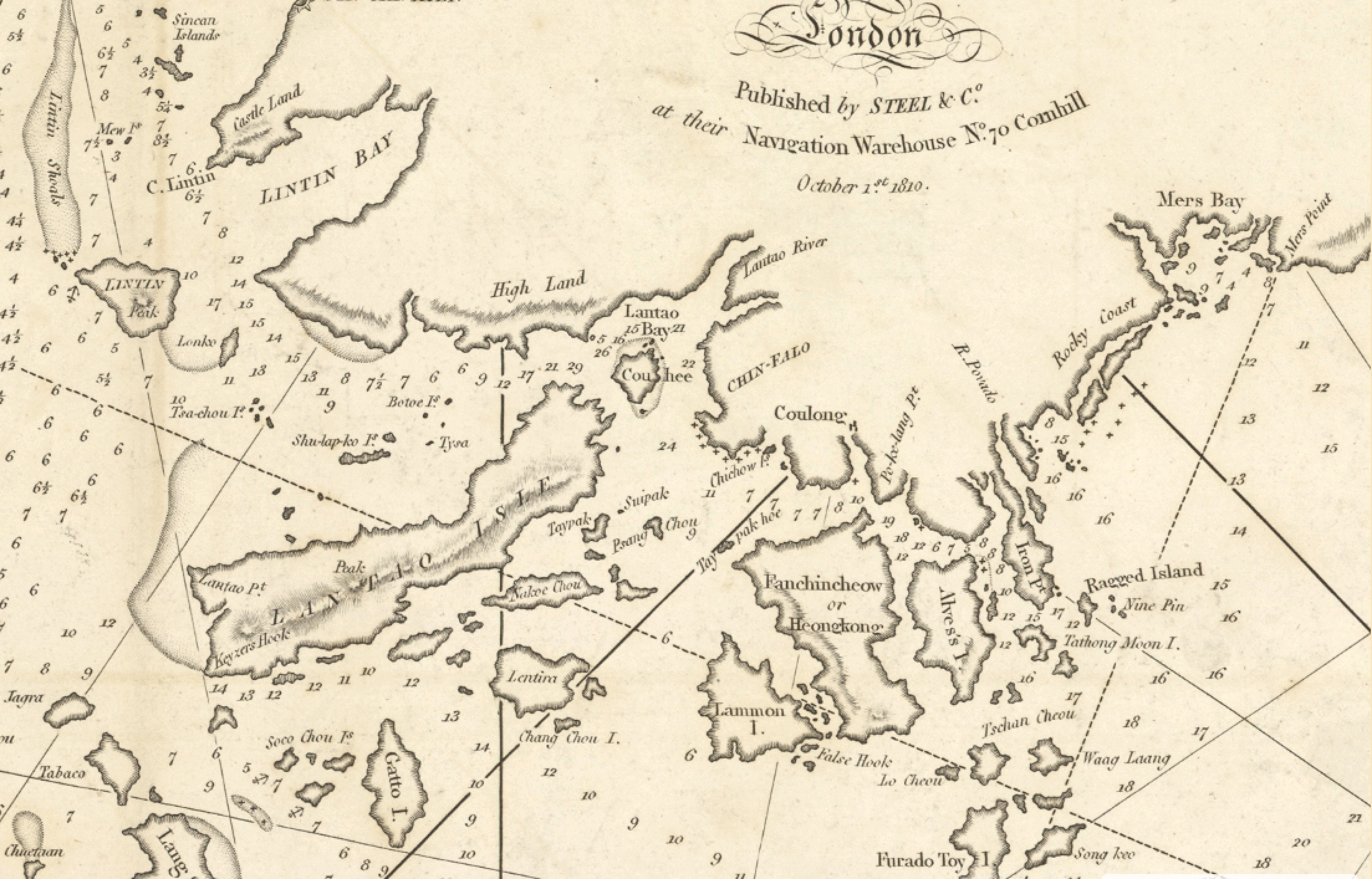
Lantau Island as observed in 1794 by British sailors from Canton, published 1810.

Lantau Island was surveyed by a French fleet by Alexandre Dalmypre around the Delta of the Pearl River in 1760. Lantau Island was already clearly visible on Western maps around the Delta, on the most important waterway to Canton.

Lantau was once a base for pirates and smugglers, and was one of the haunts of Cheung Po Tsai in the 19th century. Galena, a mineral consisting of lead and silver, was mined at Mui Wo until the 19th century.

Lantau Island was a major site of resistance against the Japanese during the Second World War. The resistance movement made use of the island's wooded areas and deep valleys in order to organise ambushes and move supplies. The resistance movement persevered through the war until the end of the Japanese occupation in 1945.

In 2000, Lantau Island acted as an important base for the Fiber-Optic Link Around the Globe project and the Asia-Pacific Cable Network which acts as an Internet bridge to the rest of the world.

== Tourist attractions ==
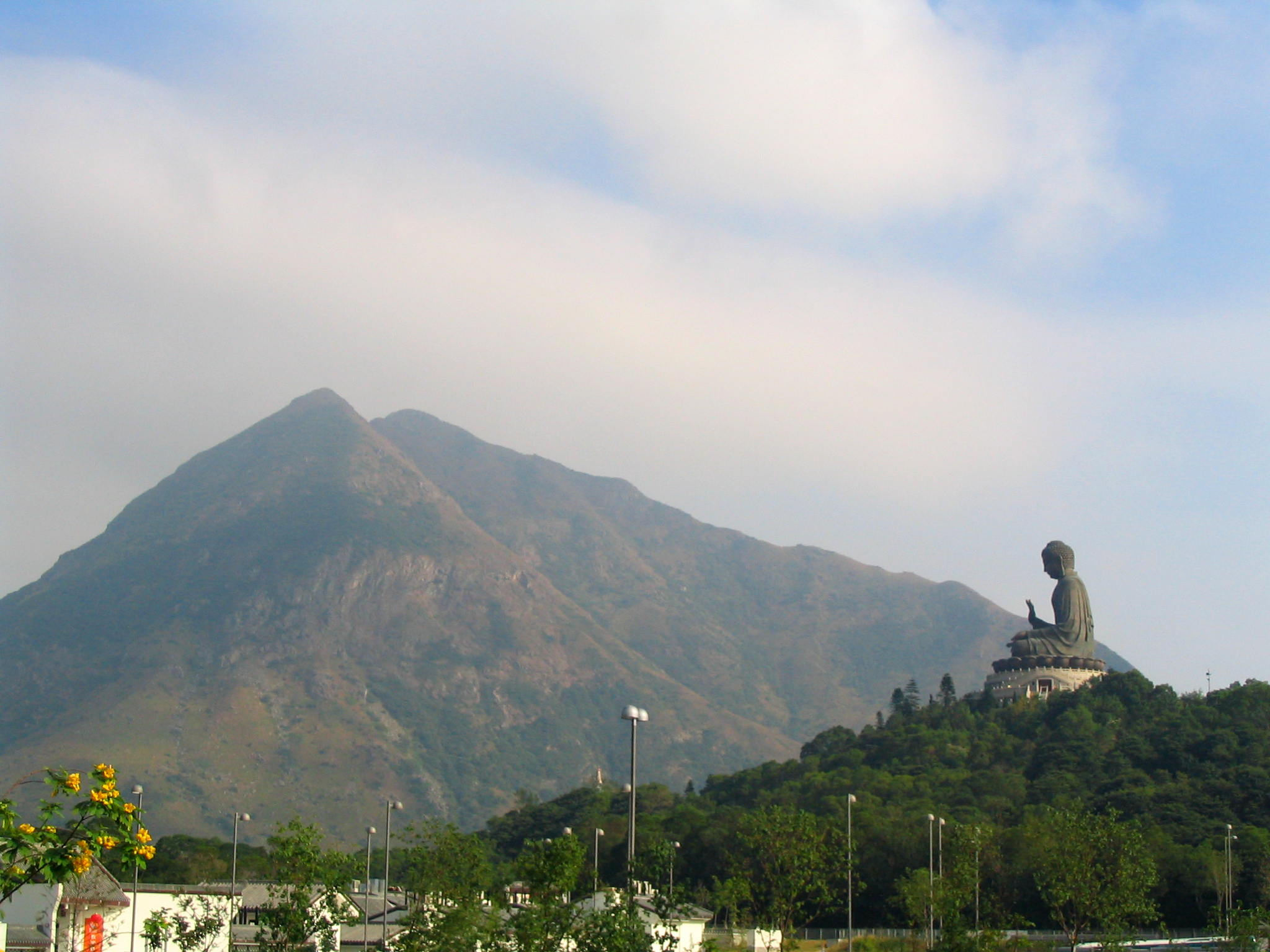
The Big Buddha with Lantau Peak in the background

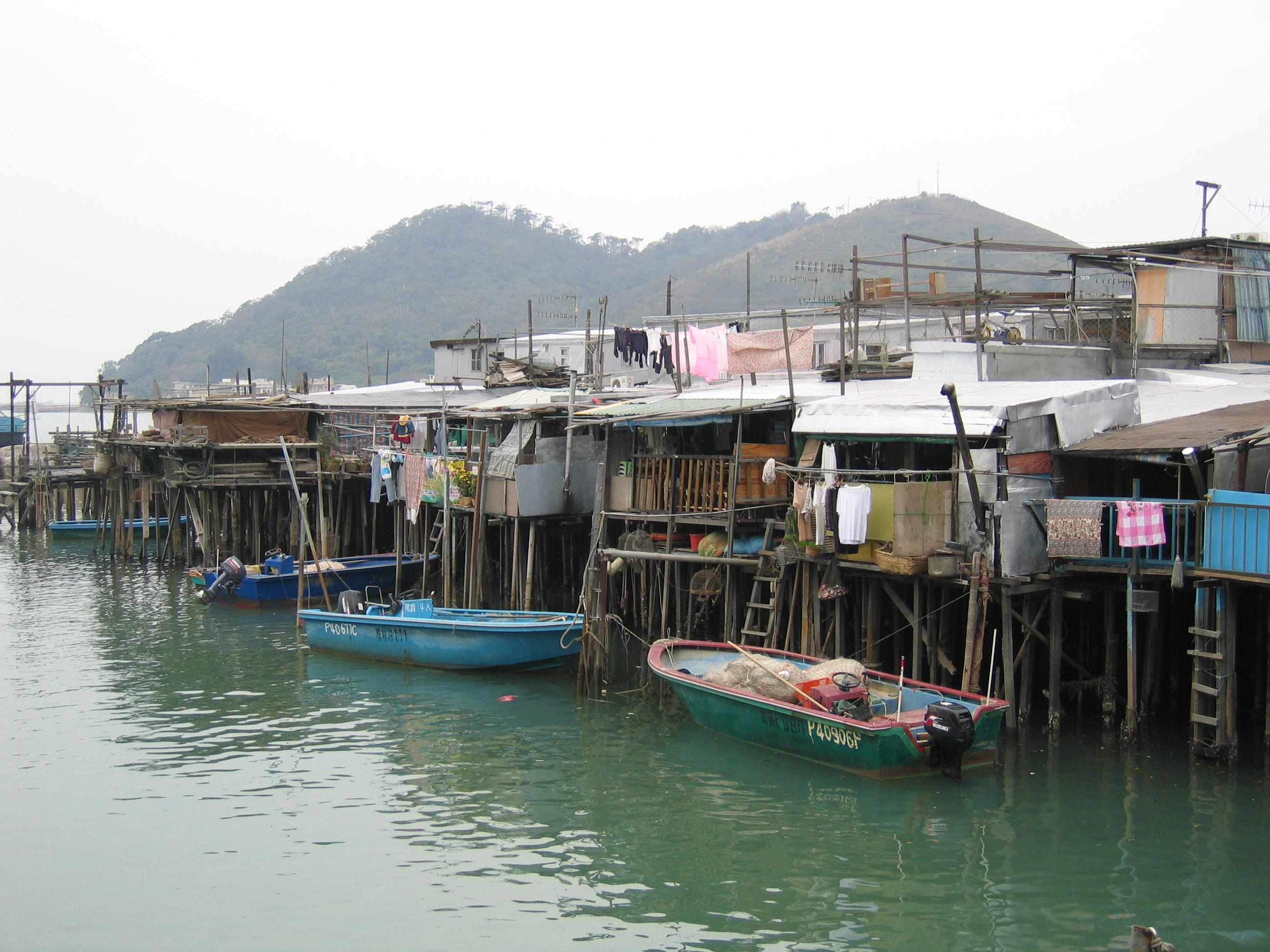
Stilt houses (pang uk) in Tai O

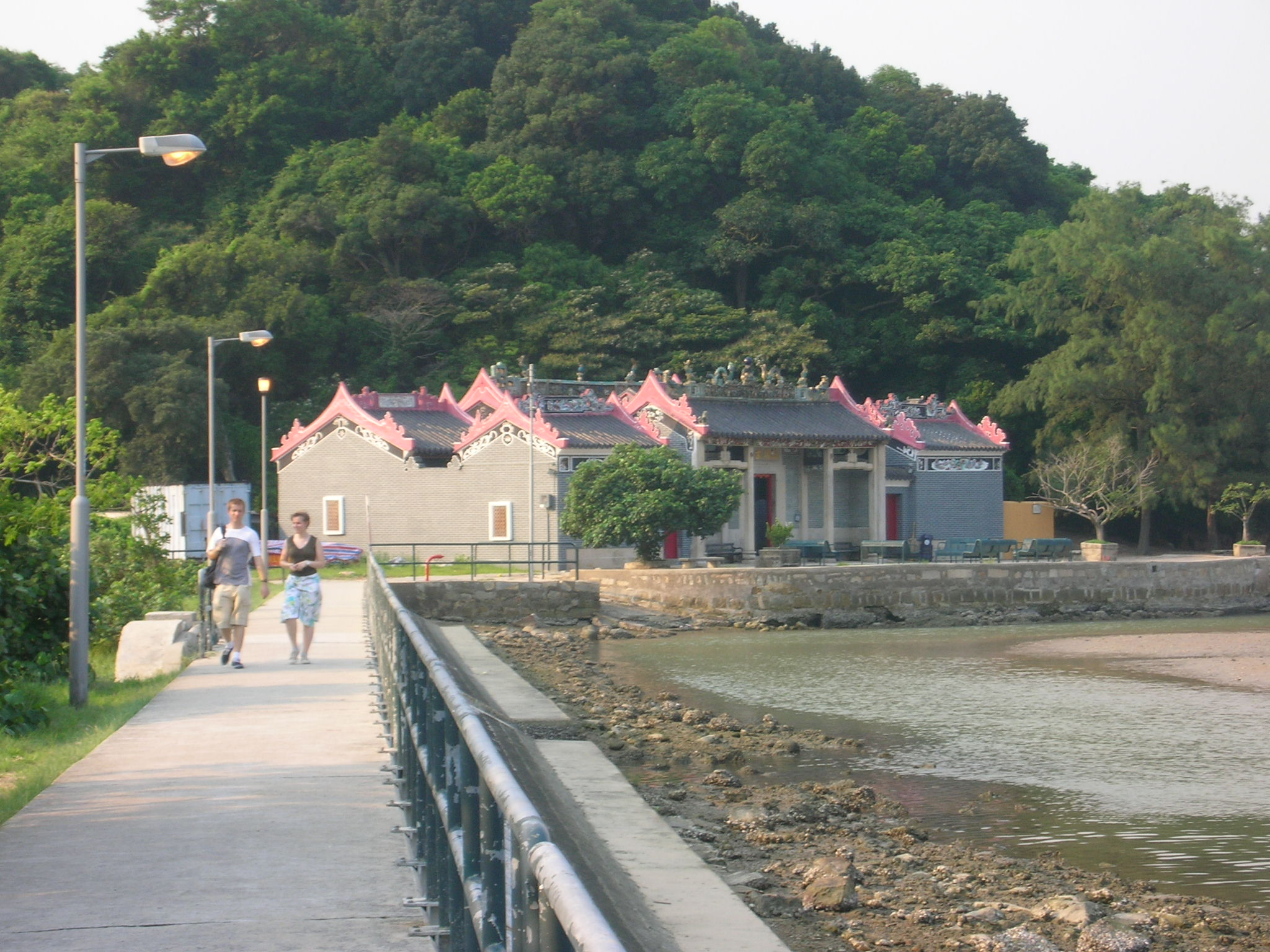
The Yeung Hau Temple in Tai O was built in 1699.

=== Ngong Ping ===
The Ngong Ping Plateau features the Po Lin Monastery and its vegetarian restaurant, as well as the 85-foot (26 m)-high bronze Big Buddha (or "Giant Buddha") statue, once the world's largest seated outdoor bronze Buddha statue. Walkers can ascend from Tung Chung to the monastery in two hours. Visitors can also take a 25-minute ride on a Ngong Ping 360 cable car from Tung Chung to the Ngong Ping Plateau. Ngong Ping 360 is a tourism experience which combines a 5.7 km (3.5 mi) cable car journey with a cultural themed village and easy access to Tian Tan Buddha.

=== Tai O ===
Tai O is an over three centuries old fishing village located in the northwest of Lantau Island. Tourists visit Tai O for its several hundred stilt houses (pang uk), though some of those houses have been repaired after a fire in July 2000 and others from damage caused by super typhoons and related storm surges in subsequent years. While Tai O is in the process of being revitalised with a series of measures such as new signages and two bridges to facilitate movement of visitors, Tai O retains most of its historical setting such as waterways, stilt houses and fishing boats and is famous for its fishing village scenery in a mountainous setting. Traditional Chinese food like salted fish and locally produced shrimp paste can be found there.

=== Tung Chung ===
Tung Chung Fort was built in 1817 to thwart the opium trade and defend the coast from pirates. There are 6 old cannons and the enclosures are made of granite. During World War II, the Japanese army occupied the fort. In 1979, it was listed as one of the historical monuments of Hong Kong and was refurbished in 1988. The ruins of the Tung Chung Battery, also a historical monument, are located nearby.

=== Trappist Haven Monastery ===
The Trappist Haven Monastery at Tai Shui Hang, home to a number of Roman Catholic monks, sits on the east coast of Lantau Island, approximately halfway between the towns of Mui Wo and Discovery Bay. The Lantau Trappist congregation was established in Beijing in the 19th century.

=== Hong Kong Disneyland ===
Hong Kong Disneyland lies on the northeastern part of the island, approximately two kilometres (1.2 mi) from Discovery Bay. It opened on 12 September 2005 on a massive land reclamation project in Penny's Bay. The US$1.8 billion project includes a Disney theme park, three hotels, and retail, dining and entertainment facilities stretching over 1.26 km^{2} (310 acres). The project also has its own rail network linking from Sunny Bay MTR station in Yam O.

=== Nature ===
Over 50% of Lantau consists of national parks, including a large number of well-marked trails. The best known of these is the 70 kilometre, 12 section Lantau Trail composed of beauty of natural stone steps and the dense woodland along a 3-kilometer stretch. Section 11 of the Lantau Trail starts just across the Tung Chung Road, which is not far from Ngong Ping 360. This section of the trail will reach South Lantau Road at Pui O and hikers can appreciate the beauty of natural stone steps and the dense woodland along the 3 km journey. The national parks feature campsites and youth hostels. Lantau's longest beach is Cheung Sha and one of its most famous hikes is to Sunset Peak (Tai Tung Shan 大東山), the third highest peak in Hong Kong.

== Flora and fauna ==
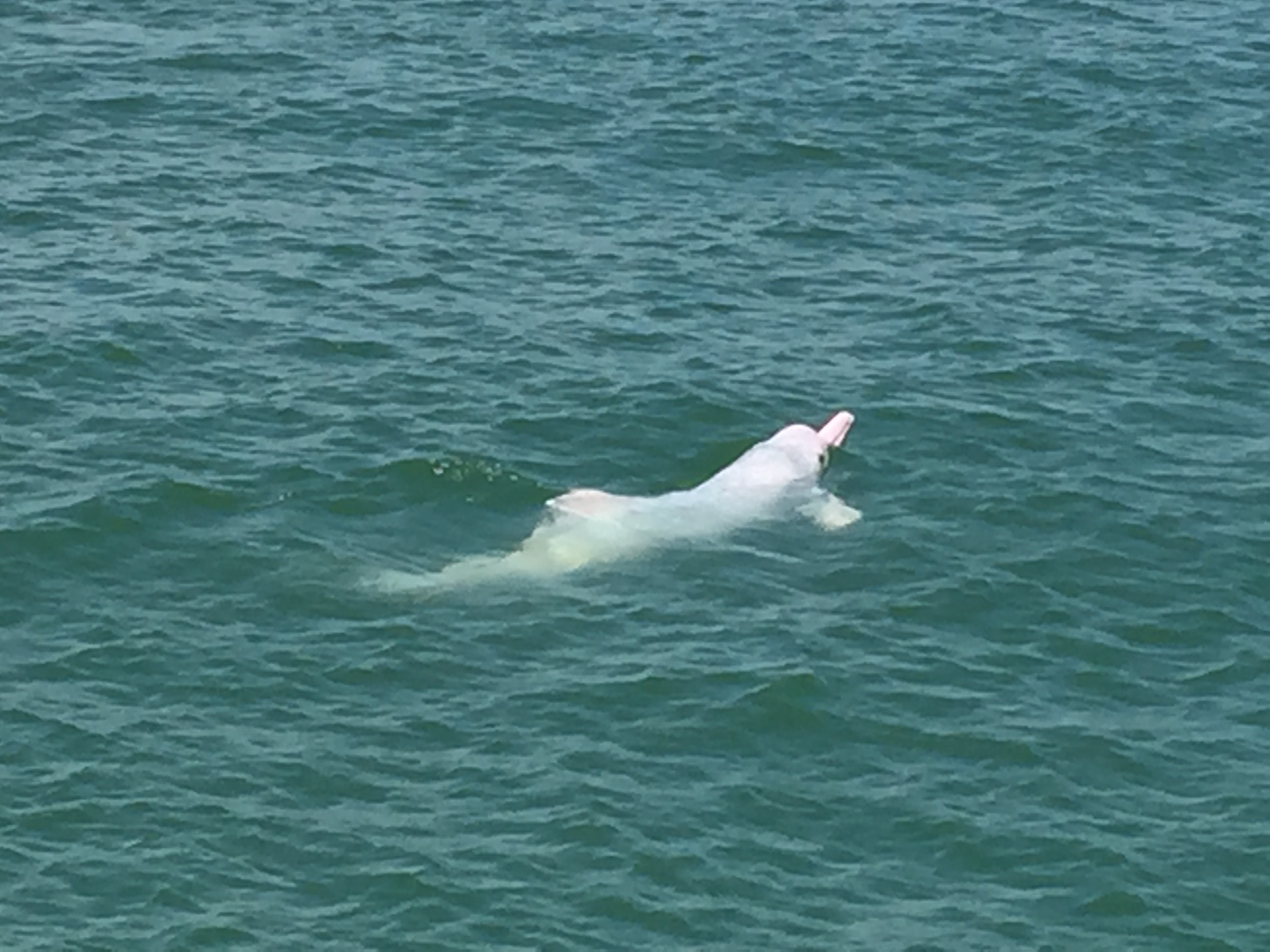
Adult Chinese white dolphin swimming off the coast of Lantau Island

Chinese white dolphins, often called pink dolphins, can be seen off the coast of Lantau. As of 2014, a marine park, the Southwest Lantau Marine Park, is being planned to protect them. In the southern parts of Lantau Island, local residents rely on local oyster fields, lemon and tangerine trees to make preserved fruits. There are also feral water buffalos living in Mui Wo and Pui O. The entire southern part of Lantau Island has a well-established ecosystem.

== Prisons ==
There are six prisons on Lantau Island: Chi Ma Wan Correctional Institution, Chi Sun Correctional Institution (formerly the Chi Ma Wan Drug Addiction Treatment Centre), Ma Mo Ping Prison, Tong Fuk centre west of Tong Fuk, Sha Tsui Detention Centre and the maximum security Shek Pik Prison, both located near Shek Pik Reservoir. Plans were put forward by the government to build an enormous "Super Prison" on the sparsely populated nearby island of Hei Ling Chau, to be connected by a bridge to Mui Wo. However, this plan was indefinitely shelved after organised resistance by local residents.

== Transport ==
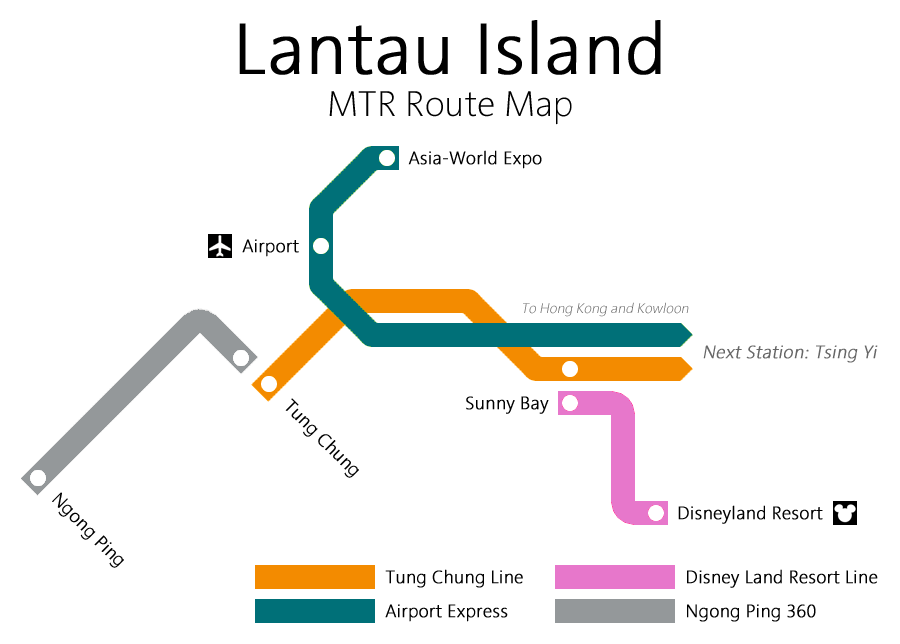
MTR route map in the Lantau Island area

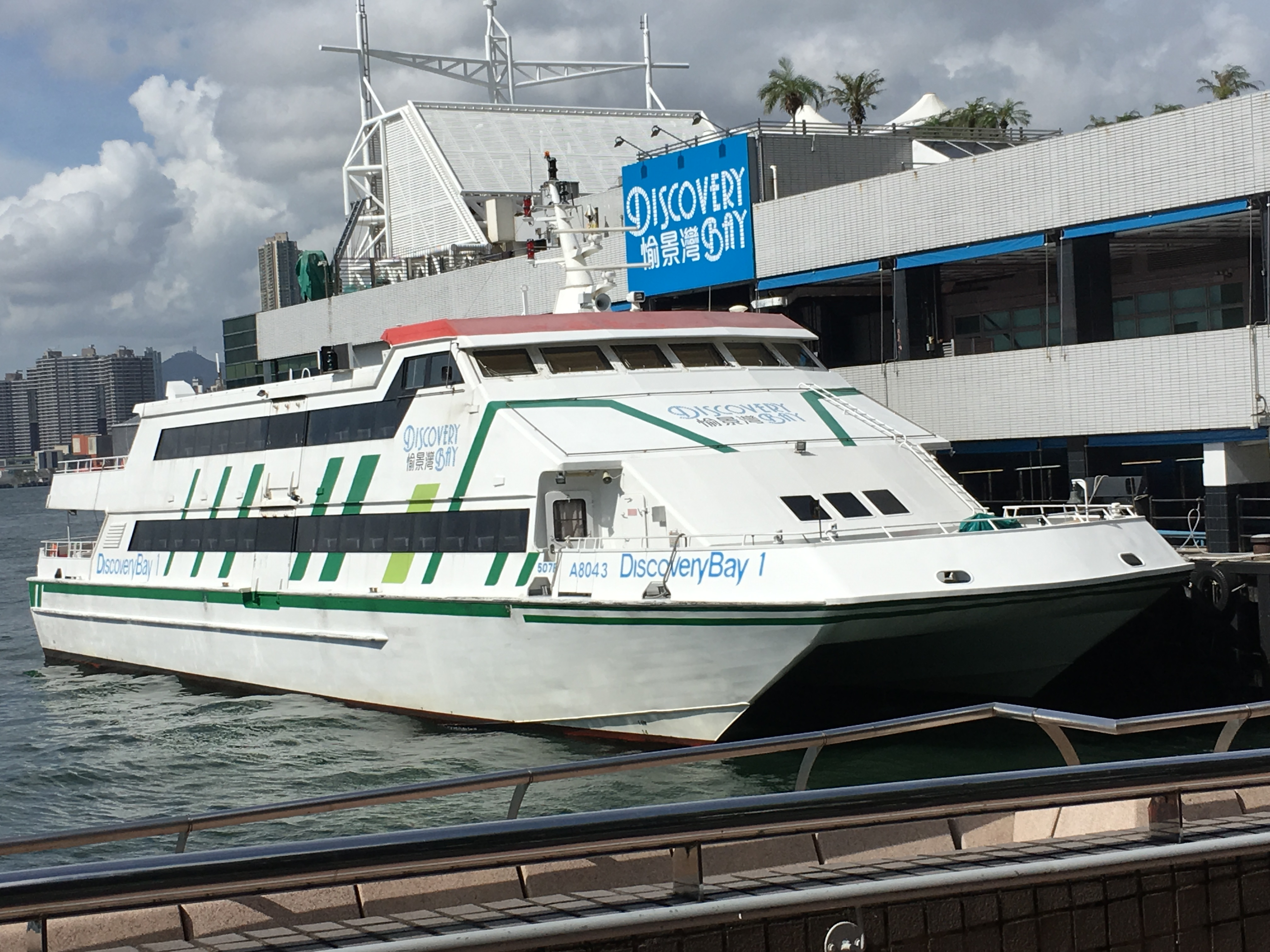
Discovery Bay ferry at Central Pier 3

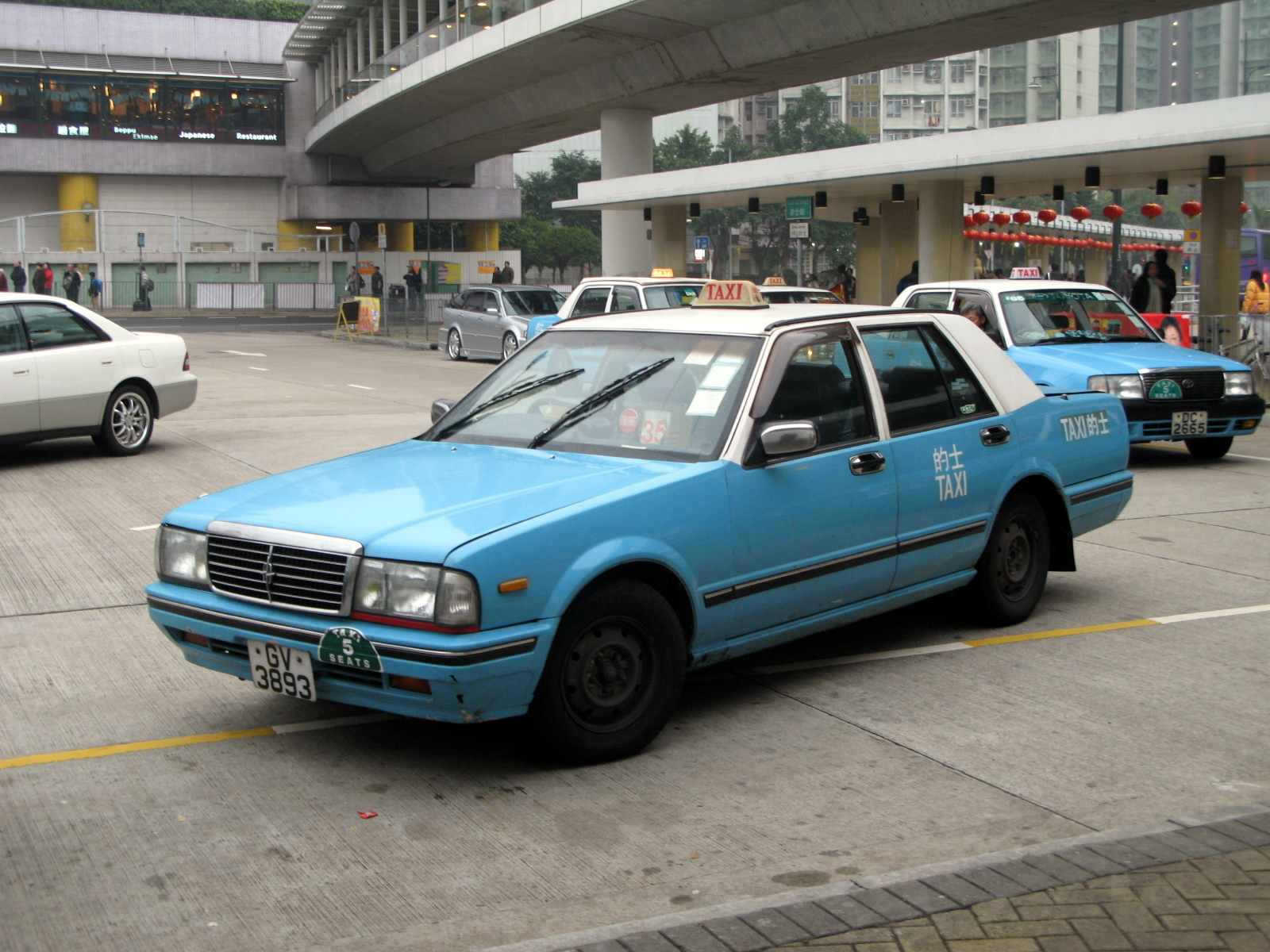
Blue Lantau taxi in Tung Chung

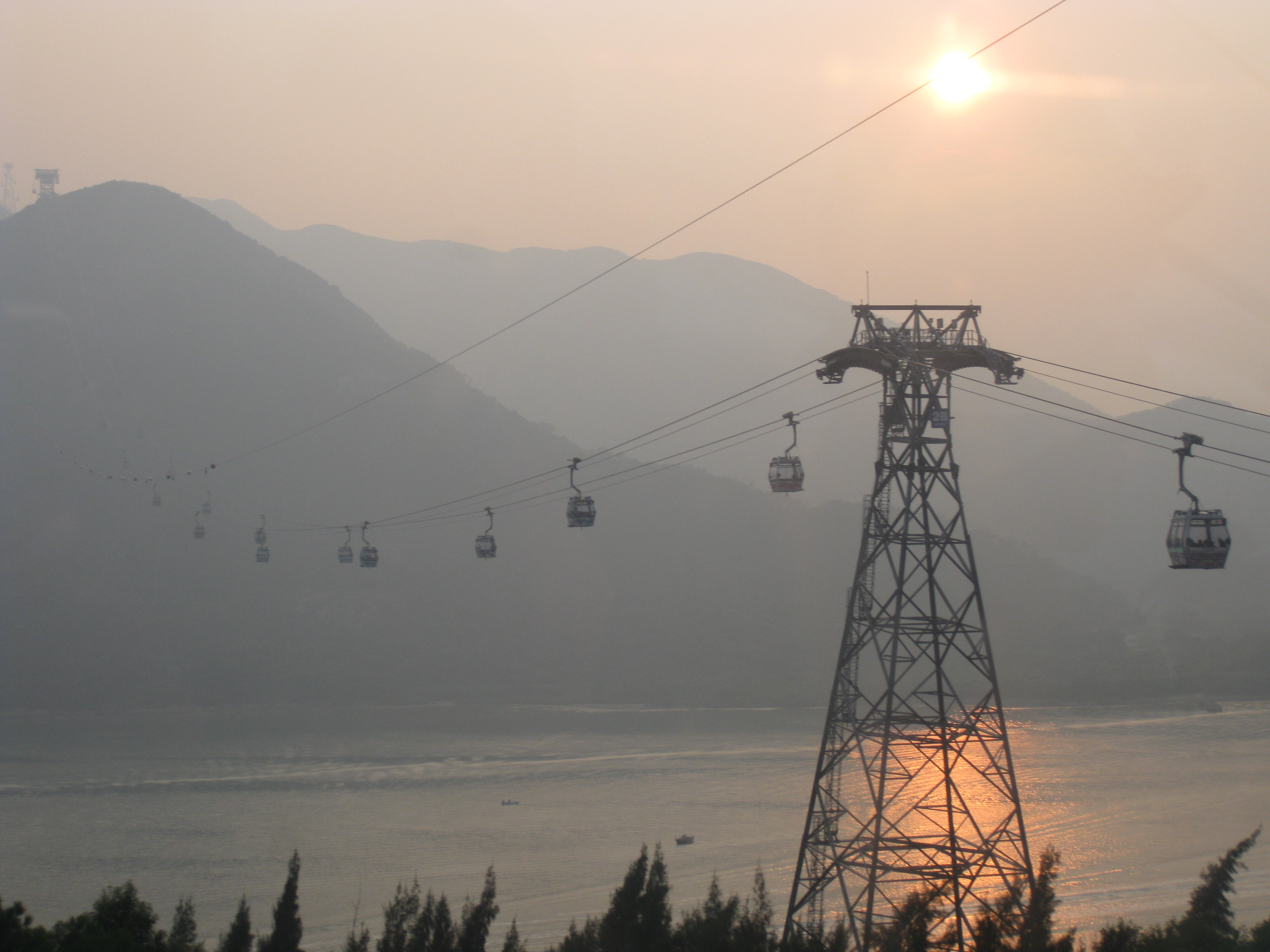
Ngong Ping 360 across Tung Chung Bay

=== Airport ===
Hong Kong International Airport (HKG/HKIA) is located on Chek Lap Kok island and started service in July 1998. It is located off the north coast of Lantau, near the new town of Tung Chung and is connected to urban areas by the Lantau Link, which is composed of the Kap Shui Mun Bridge, the Ma Wan Viaduct, and the Tsing Ma Bridge.

=== Rail ===
The airport also has a metro rail connection to the rest of Hong Kong via the MTR's Airport Express, along with several bus routes. This was built in the 1990s, whilst the new airport was being built. Using the Airport Express, the journey time between Central, Hong Kong's business district, and Chek Lap Kok airport is 24 minutes (though the Airport Express does not make any stops in Lantau proper). In addition, one can reach Tung Chung by train on the Tung Chung line of the MTR, and the Disneyland Resort line branches off of the Tung Chung line at Sunny Bay station, serving the Disneyland Resort station at Hong Kong Disneyland Resort.

=== Water transport ===
Tourists can get to Lantau using ferry services provided by Sun Ferry. This ferry service is available between Mui Wo and Central with a transportation time of about 30 to 50 minutes, depending on the vessel. A 24-hour ferry service operated by HKR International Limited connects Pier 3 in Central to Discovery Bay with a transportation time of 25 minutes.

There are also several smaller inter-island ferry services linking neighbouring islands and the mainland. These ferries, known locally as kai-tos (pronounced Guy-doe) provide scheduled services. These include Nim Shue Wan; adjacent to Discovery Bay, and Peng Chau Island with a stopover at the Trappist Haven Monastery on Lantau, Nim Shue Wan and Mui Wo on Lantau. Other Kai-To and ferry services link Peng Chau, Mui Wo Lantau, Chi Ma Wan Lantau, and Cheung Chau Island, and another links Tuen Mun, Tung Chung, Sha Lo Wan, and Tai O.

Travel between islands is also possible by walla walla, a traditional water taxi, typically from nearby Cheung Chau Island.

=== Road transport ===
Residents and tourists can travel within Lantau Island either by taxi or bus. The New Lantao Bus provides major bus services within the island, where one can get to Tai O and Po Lin Monastery from Mui Wo. Some of the roads and bridges were built in the 1990s, whilst the new airport was being built.

In Hong Kong, there are three types of taxis. Red taxis serve the urban areas, green taxis serve the New Territories while taxis on Lantau Island are blue in colour. All three taxi services can ply for passengers at the Airport and Tung Chung, but only the blue taxis can take passengers to other locations on Lantau Island. There are 75 blue taxis serving the Lantau Island area. (25 added in 2016)

The southern part of Lantau Island are one of the most dangerous roads in all of Hong Kong due to the narrow and hilly roads that are inaccessible to buses with lack of safety barriers. From February 2016, owners of private vehicles that wish to travel to these roads must obtain a temporary permit. However, due to the dangerous roads, the permit only lasts from 8am-7pm, only has 25 allotments, and only available on weekdays, while residents of these areas must obtain a permanent permit.

=== Cable car ===
The Ngong Ping 360, a gondola lift, is located on Lantau and is operated by the MTR. Opened on 18 September 2006, this provides a 5.7 km 20-minute gondola cableway journey between Tung Chung and Ngong Ping, where the Big Buddha is located.

== Education ==
Most of Lantau Island is in Primary One Admission (POA) School Net 98, which contains multiple aided schools on Lantau Island, including six in Tung Chung; no government primary schools are in this net.

Northeast Lantau Island is in POA School Net 62, which includes schools in Tsuen Wan and areas nearby. The net includes multiple aided schools and one government school, Hoi Pa Street Government Primary School.

Discovery Bay, Nim Shue Wan, and Tai Pak Wan are in POA School Net 99, which contains two aided schools: SKH Wei Lun Primary School in Discovery Bay and Holy Family School in Peng Chau; no government primary schools are in this net.

Discovery Bay International School and Discovery College are private co-educational schools in Discovery Bay.

In Yu Tung Court, Po On Commercial Association Wan Ho Kan Primary School, HKFEW Wong Cho Bau Secondary School, PLK Ms Ma Kam Ming - Cheung Fook Sien College and Ching Chung Hau Po Woon Primary School are the main schools in the school area.

There are also two aided secondary schools in Tung Chung North.

Hong Kong Public Libraries has three libraries on Lantau, at Mui Wo, Tai O, and Tung Chung North.

== Proposed development ==
The Lantau Development Advisory Committee (LanDAC) was formed within the Development Bureau to advise the government on Lantau Island's development potential. The committee first met in 2014. Save Lantau Alliance, an activist group opposed to large-scale development of the island, called on the council members to disclose their conflicts of interest. Numerous members hold business interests on the island, including 10 non-official members who subsequently declared interests ranging from running the AsiaWorld–Expo events centre (Allen Ha) to holding directorships at major developers with land holdings in and around Lantau (Andrew Lam of Shui On Land, Randy Yu of Sino Land, Ivan Chu of Swire).

Following the first meeting of the LanDAC, development chief Paul Chan Mo-po told the press that the government would not rule out developing country parks. LanDAC member Wu Chi-wai stated publicly that the committee was ignoring a 2007 concept plan for Lantau, developed with public consultation, and spoke against developing the country parks. Lam Chiu Ying, conservationist and former head of the Hong Kong Observatory, responded that Chan's remarks were "unacceptable" and stated, "while other cities are aiming for an increase (in greenery), we are doing the opposite. It's ridiculous."

The committee's first report, a 33-page document entitled "Space for All", was discreetly released online on 10 January 2016. Only a Chinese version of the full report was released, with an English synopsis provided. The report recommends developing Lantau Island into a "metropolis" housing between 700,000 and 1,000,000 people, a new commercial hub, and a centre of tourism. It proposes large-scale land reclamation on the north shore of the island, and a series of highway and railway connections between Kennedy Town on Hong Kong Island, passing through Hei Ling Chau and a series of artificial islands, to land at Mui Wo. Leung Chun-ying praised the report for having "fully considered the current situations of various districts in Lantau, including the conservation needs and the development potential" while it was denounced by green groups for being environmentally destructive.

On 13 January 2016, during his annual policy address, CY Leung announced that a dedicated Lantau Development Office would be set up as soon as possible to take forward development on the island. The Lantau Tomorrow Vision was announced in 2018, with the intention of creating additional islands on the east coast of Lantau.

== See also ==
- Beaches of Hong Kong
- Public housing estates on Lantau Island
- Route 8 (Hong Kong)
- Wanshan Archipelago
