= Yu Nga Court =

Public housing estate in Tung Chung, Hong Kong

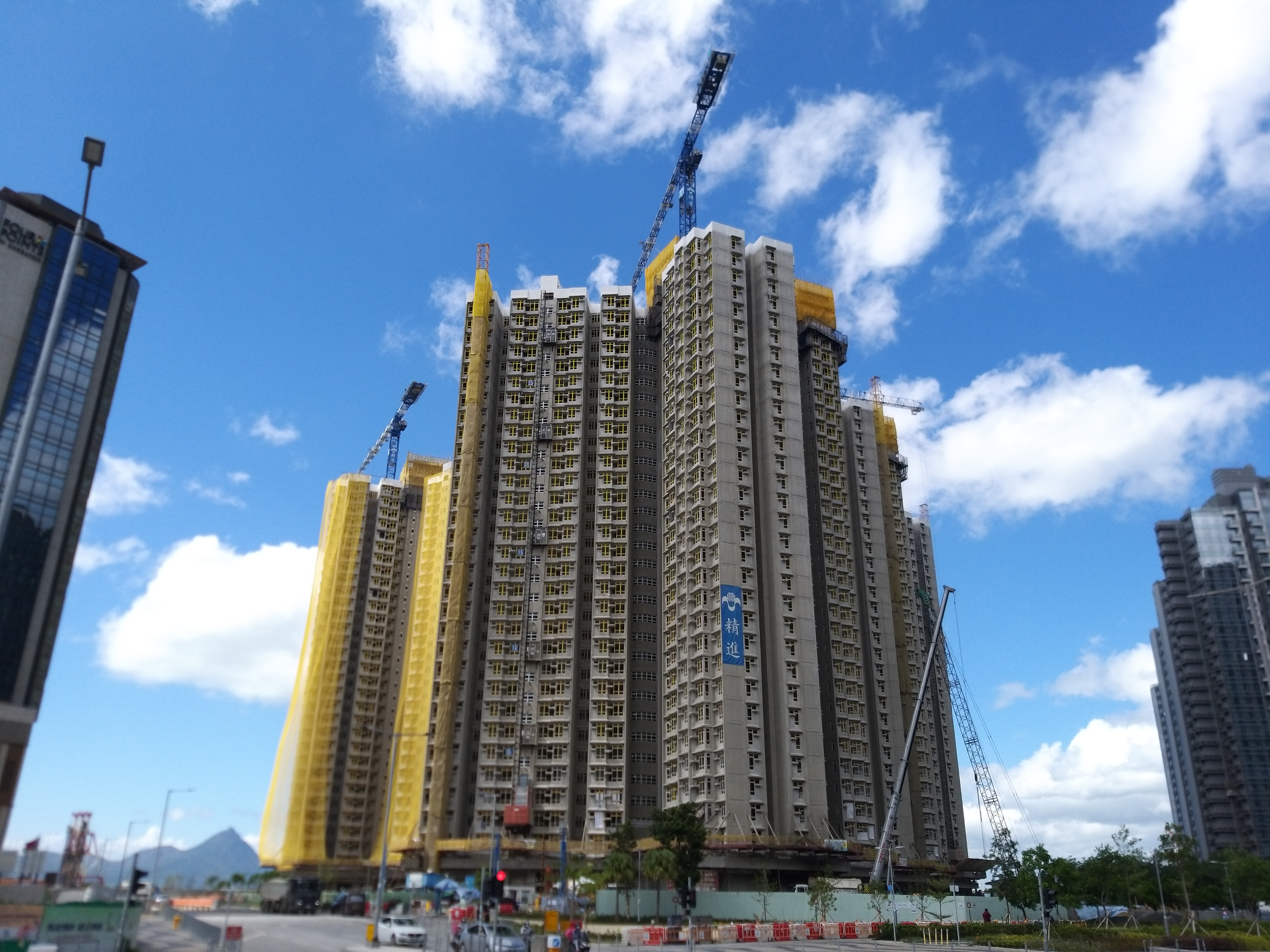
- Yu Nga Court nearing completion
- Interactive map of Yu Nga Court

General information
- Location: 8 Yi Tung Road, Tung Chung; Lantau Island; New Territories, Hong Kong
- Coordinates: 22.2955048°N 113.9478395°E
- Status: Completed
- Category: Home Ownership Scheme
- No. of blocks: 6
- No. of units: 3,300

Construction
- Constructed: 2021; 5 years ago
- Contractors: Aggressive Construction Co. Ltd
- Authority: Hong Kong Housing Authority

Yu Nga Court (Chinese: 裕雅苑) is a Home Ownership Scheme court developed by the Hong Kong Housing Authority in Tung Chung, Lantau Island, New Territories, Hong Kong near Century Link, Bermuda Park, Yi Tung Park and Sheraton Hong Kong Tung Chung Hotel. The estate was constructed by Aggressive Construction Co. Ltd and consists of six residential blocks completed in 2021. It is the first public housing project in Hong Kong that has been affected by airport height restrictions since the closure of the Kai Tak Airport in 1998. The building opened in March of 2022, and residents have started moving into the building.

== Politics ==
Yu Nga Court is located in Tung Chung North constituency of the Islands District Council. It is currently represented by Sammy Tsui Sang-hung, who was elected in the 2019 elections.

== Stores ==
Yu Nga Court comprises a number of convenience stores such as U-Select, 7-Eleven and multiple local shops for ease of use by residents.

== See also ==
- Public housing estates on Lantau Island
