= Fu Tung Estate =

Public housing estate in Tung Chung, Hong Kong

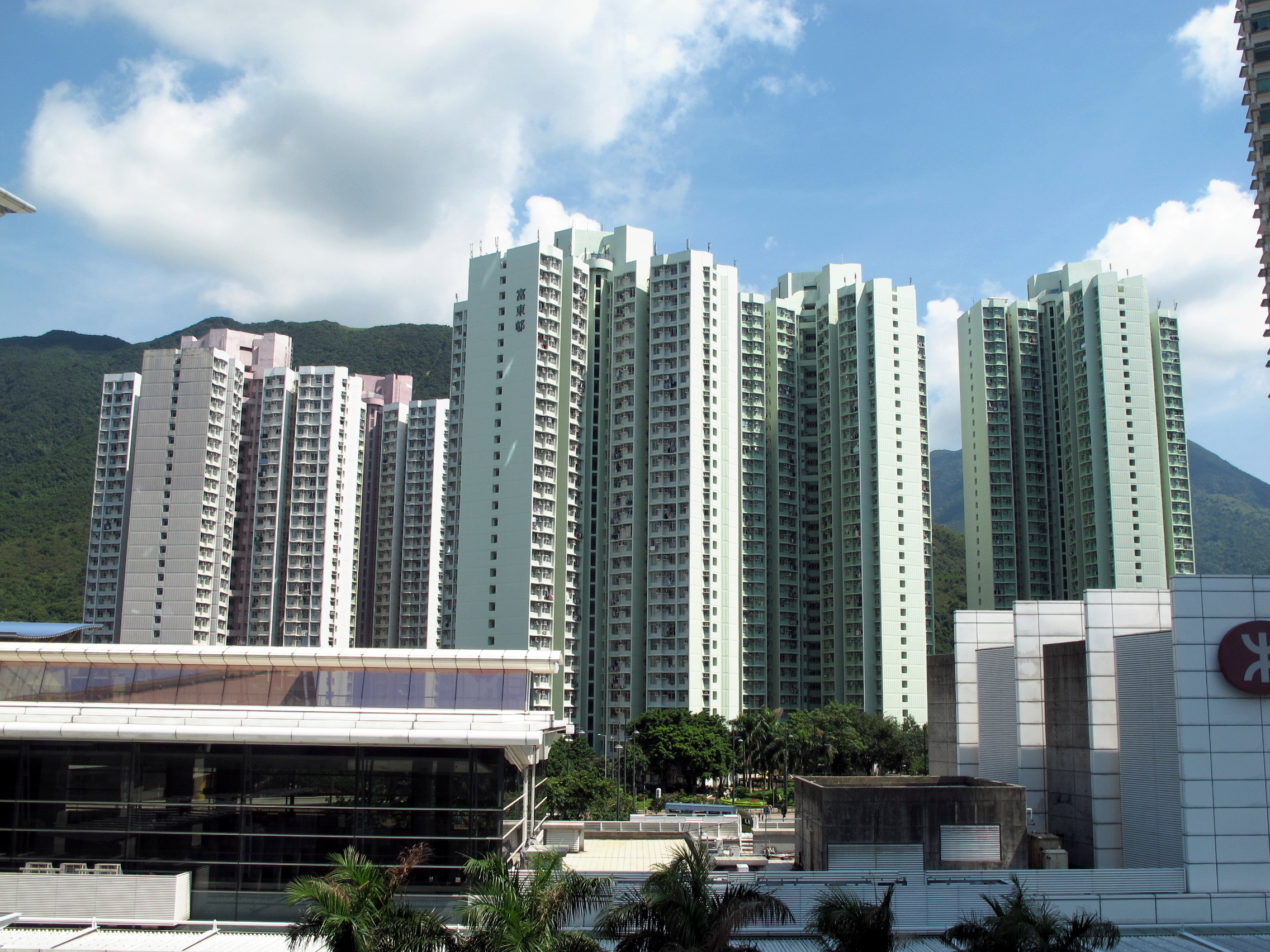
- Fu Tung Estate
- Interactive map of Fu Tung Estate

General information
- Location: 6 Fu Tung Street, Tung Chung; Lantau Island; New Territories, Hong Kong
- Coordinates: 22.288°N 113.942°E
- Status: Completed
- Category: Public rental housing
- Population: 5,295 (2016)
- No. of blocks: 3
- No. of units: 1,664

Construction
- Constructed: 1997; 29 years ago
- Authority: Hong Kong Housing Authority

Fu Tung Estate
- Traditional Chinese: 富東邨
- Simplified Chinese: 富东邨
Transcriptions
Standard Mandarin
- Hanyu Pinyin: Fù Dōng Cūn
Yue: Cantonese
- Jyutping: fu3 dung1 cyun1

Fu Tung Estate (Chinese: 富東邨) is a public housing estate in Tung Chung, Lantau Island, New Territories, Hong Kong near MTR Tung Chung station. Built on the reclaimed land of North Lantau New Town Phase 1 project, it is the first public housing estate in Tung Chung and consists of three residential buildings completed in 1997.

Yu Tung Court (Chinese: 裕東苑) is a Home Ownership Scheme court in Tung Chung, near Fu Tung Estate and Tung Chung station. Built on the reclaimed land of North Lantau New Town Phase 1 project, it has five residential buildings completed in 1997.

== Houses ==
=== Fu Tung Estate ===
| Name | Chinese name | Building type | Completed |
|---|---|---|---|
| Tung Ma House | 東馬樓 | Harmony 1 | 1997 |
| Tung Po House | 東埔樓 | Harmony 1 | 1997 |
| Tung Shing House | 東盛樓 | Harmony 1 | 1997 |

=== Yu Tung Court ===
| Name | Chinese name | Building type | Completed |
|---|---|---|---|
| Heung Tung House | 向東閣 | Harmony 1 | 1997 |
| Hor Tung House | 賀東閣 | Harmony 1 | 1997 |
| Hei Tung House | 喜東閣 | Harmony 1 | 1997 |
| Kai Tung House | 啟東閣 | Harmony 1 | 1997 |
| Sun Tung House | 新東閣 | Harmony 1 | 1997 |

== Demographics ==
According to the 2016 by-census, Fu Tung Estate had a population of 5,295 while Yu Tung Court had a population of 6,655. Altogether the population amounts to 11,950.

== Politics ==
Fu Tung Estate and Yu Tung Court are located in Tung Chung South constituency of the Islands District Council. It is currently represented by Sheep Wong Chun-yeung, who was elected in the 2019 elections.

== See also ==
- Public housing estates on Lantau Island
