= Public housing estates on Lantau Island =

Public housing on Lantau Island, Hong Kong

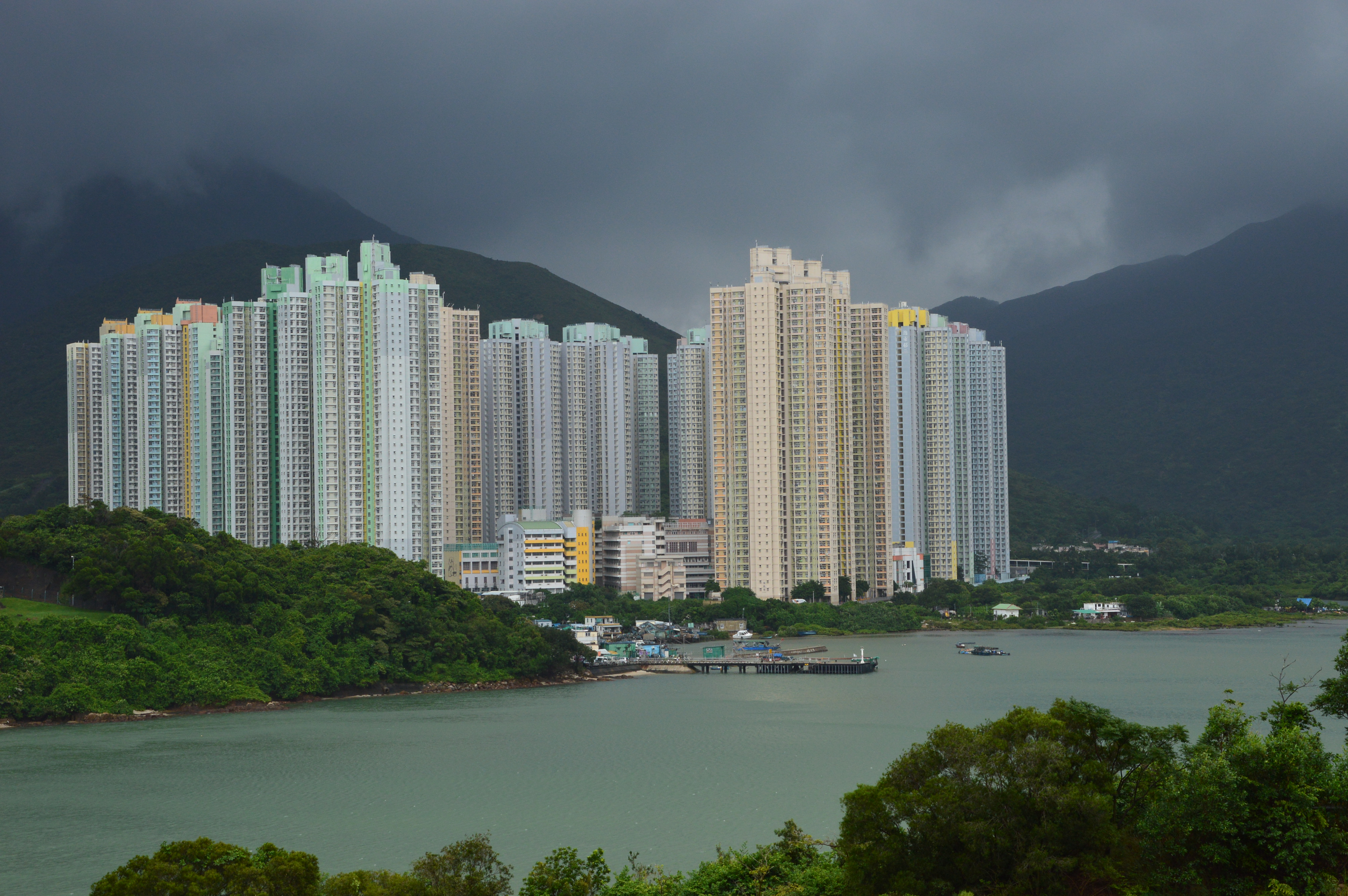
Yat Tung Estate

This is a list of public housing estates on Lantau Island, Hong Kong.

== Overview ==
Name		Type	Inaug.	No Blocks	No Units	Location
Fu Tung Estate	富東邨	Public	1997	3	1,664	Tung Chung
Yu Tung Court	裕東苑	HOS	1997	5	2,640	Tung Chung
Yat Tung (I) Estate	逸東(一)邨	Public	2001	13	5,597	Tung Chung
Yat Tung (II) Estate	逸東(二)邨	Public	2004	12	6,382	Tung Chung
Ying Tung Estate	迎東邨	Public	2018	4	3,580	Tung Chung
Lung Hin Court	龍軒苑	HOS	1995	4	179	Tai O
Lung Tin Estate	龍田邨	Public	1980	9	552	Tai O
Ngan Wan Estate	銀灣邨	Public	1988	4	448	Mui Wo
Ngan Ho Court	銀河苑	HOS	2018	2	529	Mui Wo
Ngan Wai Court	銀蔚苑	HOS	2018	1	170	Mui Wo
Mun Tung Estate	滿東邨	Public	2018	4	3,866	Tung Chung
Yu Tai Court	裕泰苑	HOS	2020	2	1,226	Tung Chung
Yu Nga Court	裕雅苑	HOS	2021	6	3,300	Tung Chung

== Future Development ==
Reclamation works at Tung Chung East and West began in earnest post-2020.

Initial public housing units are slated for handover starting in 2027, ramping up to provide 49,000 flats by 2030 for 144,000 residents. This includes a mix of public rental housing (PRH), Green Form Subsidized Home Ownership Scheme (GSH), and subsidized sale flats (SSF). Under the HKHA's 2025/26–2029/30 forecast, Tung Chung will contribute significantly to the territory-wide target of 166,600 public housing flats, with around 110,100 PRH/GSH units. Private sector involvement is anticipated through land sales for commercial-residential hybrids, potentially adding thousands more market-rate units.

TCNTE ties into the Lantau Tomorrow Vision, which envisions artificial islands near Kau Yi Chau for 260,000–400,000 additional units (70% public housing) starting reclamation in late 2025. While this is separate, it will indirectly boost Tung Chung's role as a logistics and residential hub, leveraging the Hong Kong–Zhuhai–Macau Bridge (opened 2018) for cross-border connectivity.

== Fu Tung Estate ==
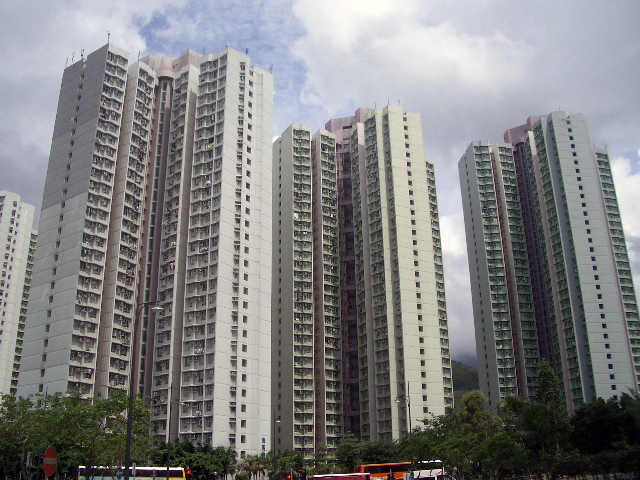
Fu Tung Estate

Fu Tung Estate (Chinese: 富東邨) is located near Tung Chung station. Built on the reclaimed land of North Lantau New Town Phase 1 project, it is the first public housing estate in Tung Chung. It consists of 3 residential buildings completed in 1997.

Name	Type	Completion
Tung Ma House	Harmony 1	1997
Tung Po House	Harmony 1	1997
Tung Shing House	Harmony 1	1997

== Yu Tung Court ==
Yu Tung Court (Chinese: 裕東苑) is a Home Ownership Scheme (HOS) court in Tung Chung, located near Fu Tung Estate and Tung Chung station. Built on the reclaimed land of North Lantau New Town Phase 1 project, it is the first and the only HOS court in Tung Chung. It has a total of 5 blocks built in 1997, together with Fu Tung Estate.

Name	Type	Completion
Heung Tung House	Harmony 1	1997
Hor Tung House	Harmony 1	1997
Hei Tung House	Harmony 1	1997
Kai Tung House	Harmony 1	1997
Sun Tung House	Harmony 1	1997

== Yat Tung Estate ==
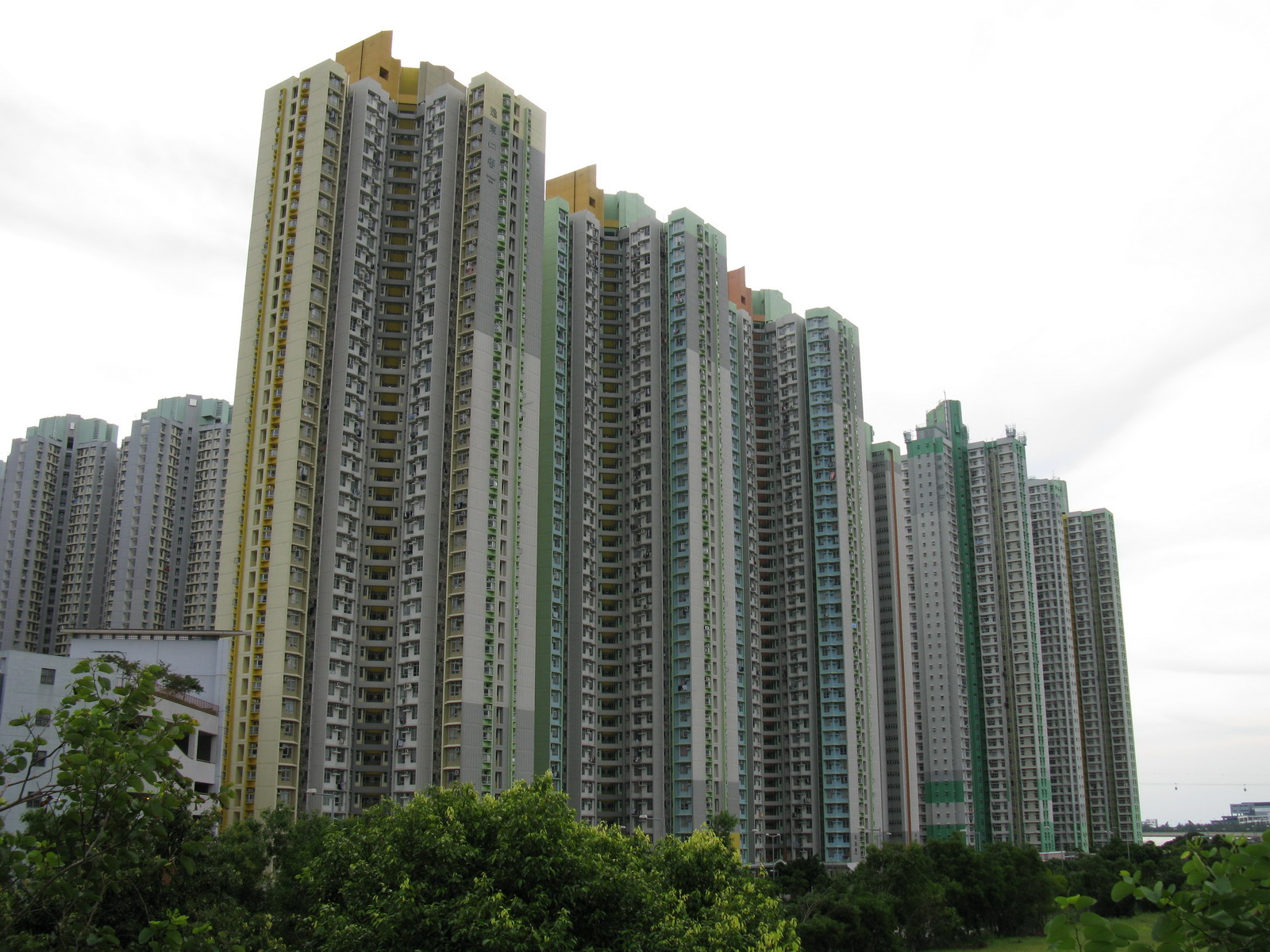
Yat Tung (II) Estate

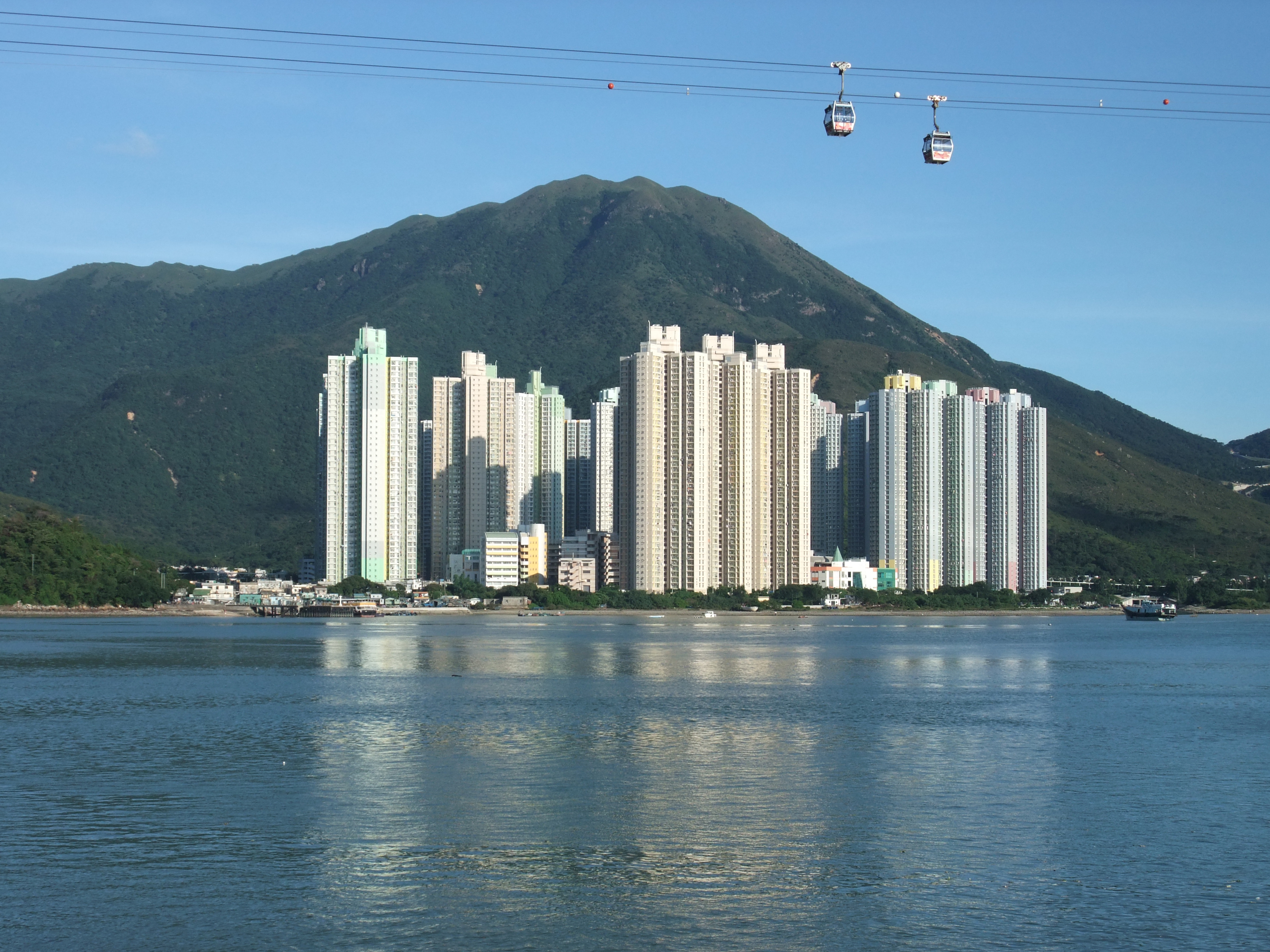
Yat Tung Estate viewed across Tung Chung Bay, with Sunset Peak in the background.

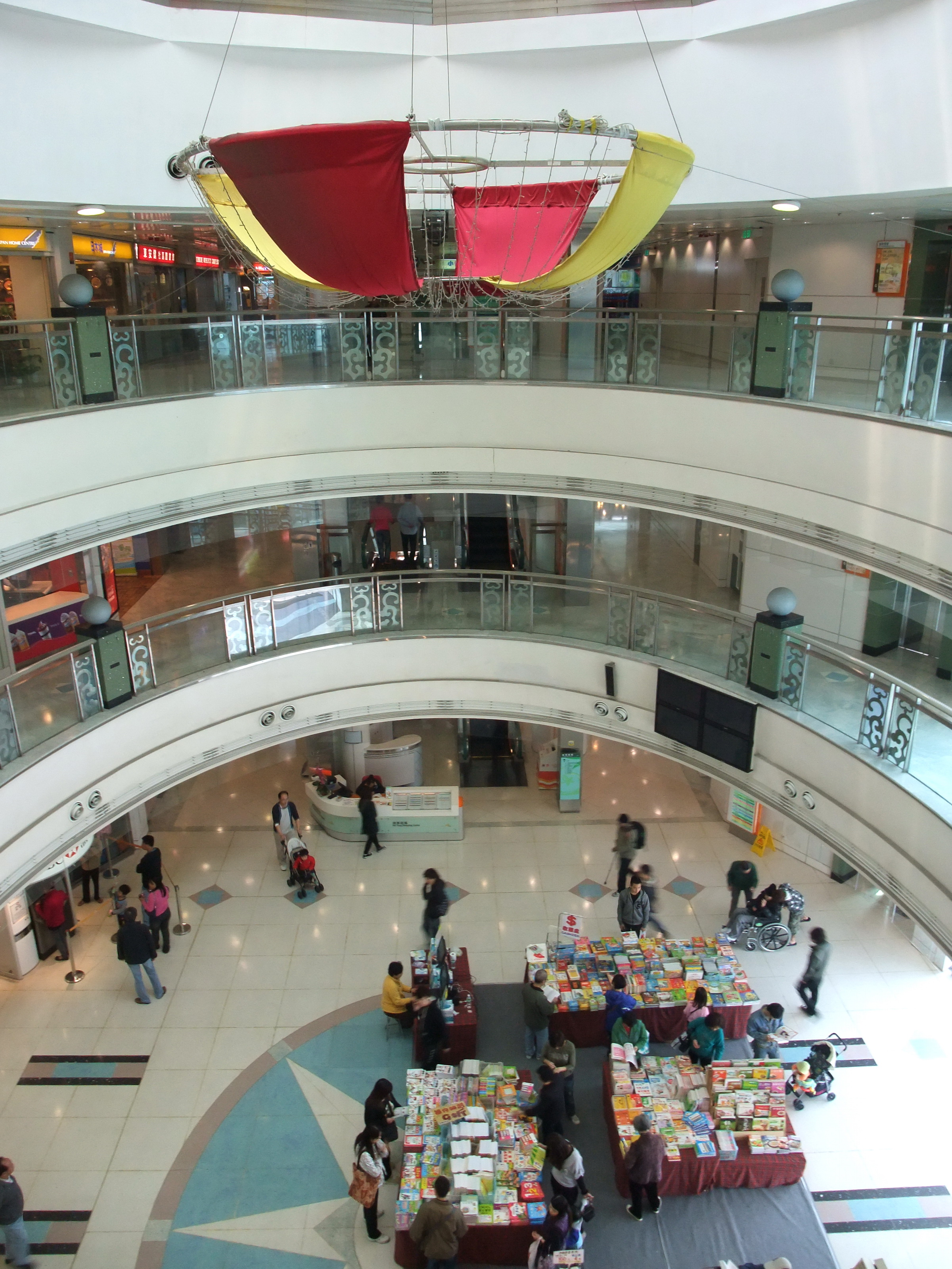
Yat Tung Shopping Centre

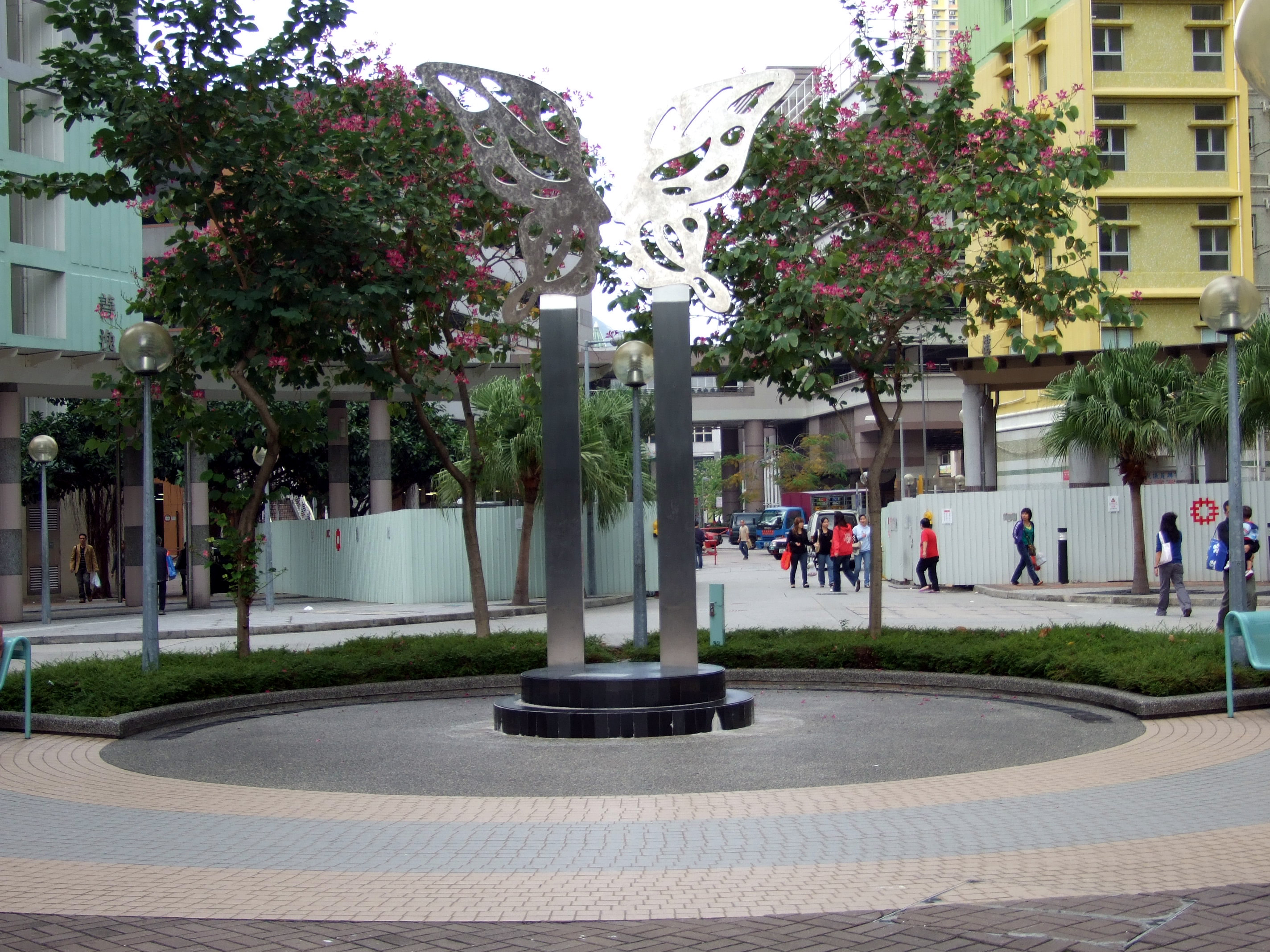
Man in Nature created by Kan Tai-keung, one of the permanent displays of Yat Tung Artwalk.

Yat Tung Estate (Chinese: 逸東邨) is located in Tung Chung. It is divided into 'Yat Tung (I) Estate' (Chinese: 逸東(一)邨), completed in 2001 and comprising 13 blocks of Concord 1 and Harmony 1 types, and 'Yat Tung (II) Estate' (Chinese: 逸東(二)邨), completed in 2004 – 2005 and comprising 12 blocks of Harmony 1 and NCB types.

Residents of Yat Tung Estate have appealed to the government to extend the Tung Chung line to Yat Tung to ease their transportation problems. Yat Tung Estate currently has 36,913 residents. They claimed that when they moved in 11 years ago, the Housing Bureau's documents indicated a MTR station at the estate. The residents currently have to take a 10-minute bus journey to Tung Chung station.

The proposed Tung Chung West station would be located adjacent to Yat Tung Estate. It is tentatively slated to open between 2020 and 2024.

Yat Tung (I) Estate

Name	Type	Completion
Ching Yat House	Harmony 1	2001
Hong Yat House	Harmony 1	2001
Yung Yat House	Harmony 1	2001
Chi Yat House	Concord 1	2001
Chau Yat House	Concord 1	2001
Fuk Yat House	Concord 1	2001
Heung Yat House	Concord 1	2001
Luk Yat House	Concord 1	2001
Ping Yat House	Concord 1	2001
Sin Yat House	Concord 1	2001
Tai Yat House	Concord 1	2001
Ying Yat House	Concord 1	2001
Yu Yat House	Concord 1	2001

Yat Tung (II) Estate

Name	Type	Completion
Mei Yat House	New Harmony 1	2005
Mun Yat House	New Harmony 1	2005
Kui Yat House	New Harmony 1 with New Harmony Annex 5	2005
Chui Yat House	NCB (Ver.1999)	2004
Him Yat House	NCB (Ver.1999)	2004
Kan Yat House	NCB (Ver.1999)	2004
Kit Yat House	NCB (Ver.1999)	2004
Po Yat House	NCB (Ver.1999)	2004
Shun Yat House	NCB (Ver.1999)	2004
Sui Yat House	NCB (Ver.1999)	2004
Tak Yat House	NCB (Ver.1999)	2004
Yuet Yat House	NCB (Ver.1999)	2004

=== Tung Chung Artwalk ===
The Hong Kong Housing Authority established the Tung Chung Artwalk (Chinese: 東涌藝術徑) at Yat Tung Estate, so as to promote public art at public housing estates. It is the first public housing estate to have a large public art scheme launched by the Hong Kong Housing Authority. Sixteen works of art selected from 316 outstanding submissions for the competition "New Face of Heritage" were firstly displayed in the estate in 2002 while another 10 artworks were added in 2006.

== Lung Hin Court ==
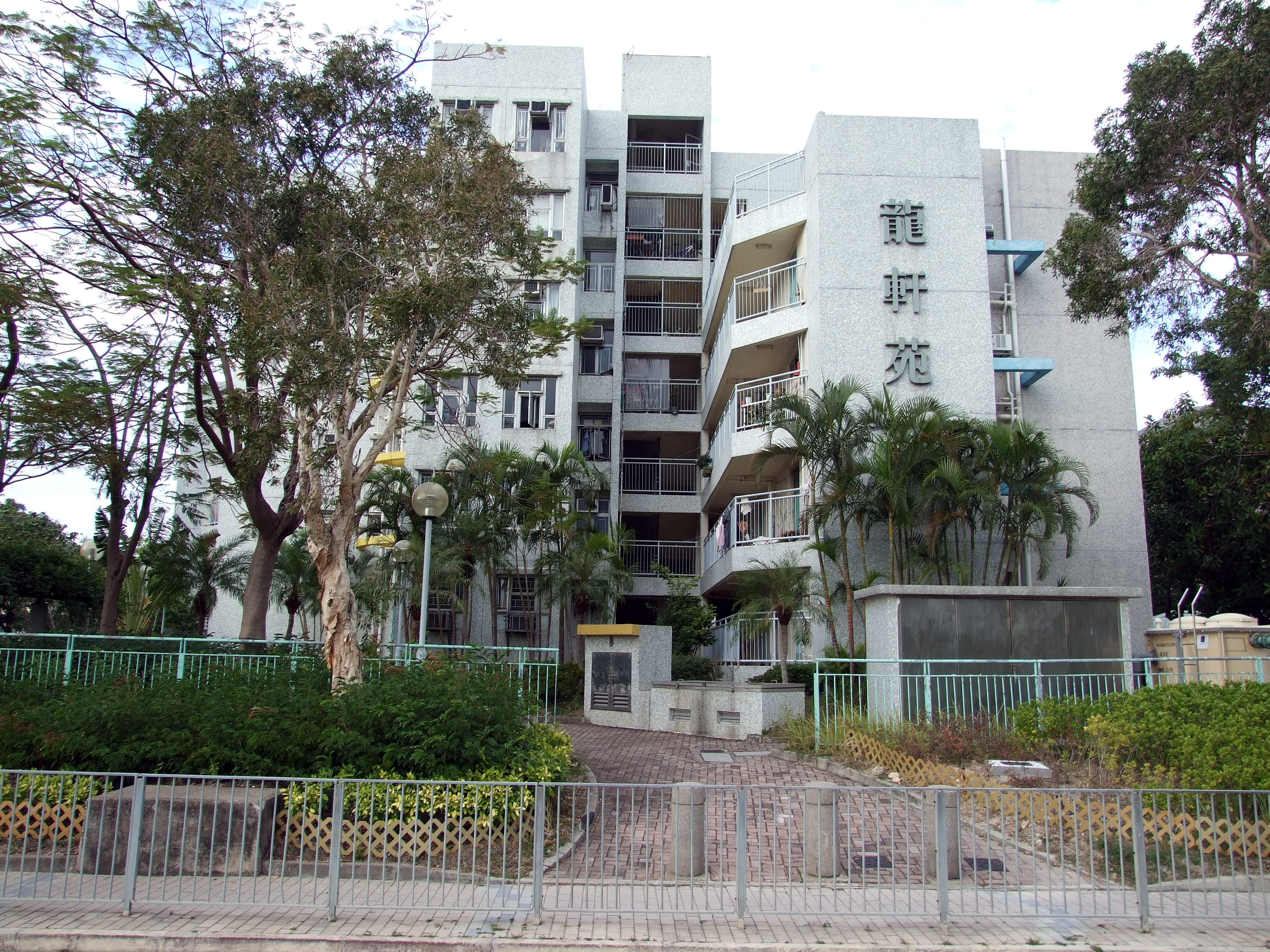
Kam Hin House of Lung Hin Court

Lung Hin Court (Chinese: 龍軒苑) is a Home Ownership Scheme court in Tai O. It is located on reclaimed land in east Tai O, next to Lung Tin Estate. The court is the Phase 2 development of Lung Tin Estate. It was originally planned for rehousing people affected by the Tai O development, but it was transferred to HOS units in 1999 since the clearance scale was largely reduced.

Name	Type	Completion
Kam Hin House	Special	1995
Lun Hin House	Special	1995
Cheong Hin House	Special	1995
Wing Hin House	Special	1995

== Lung Tin Estate and Tin Lee Court ==
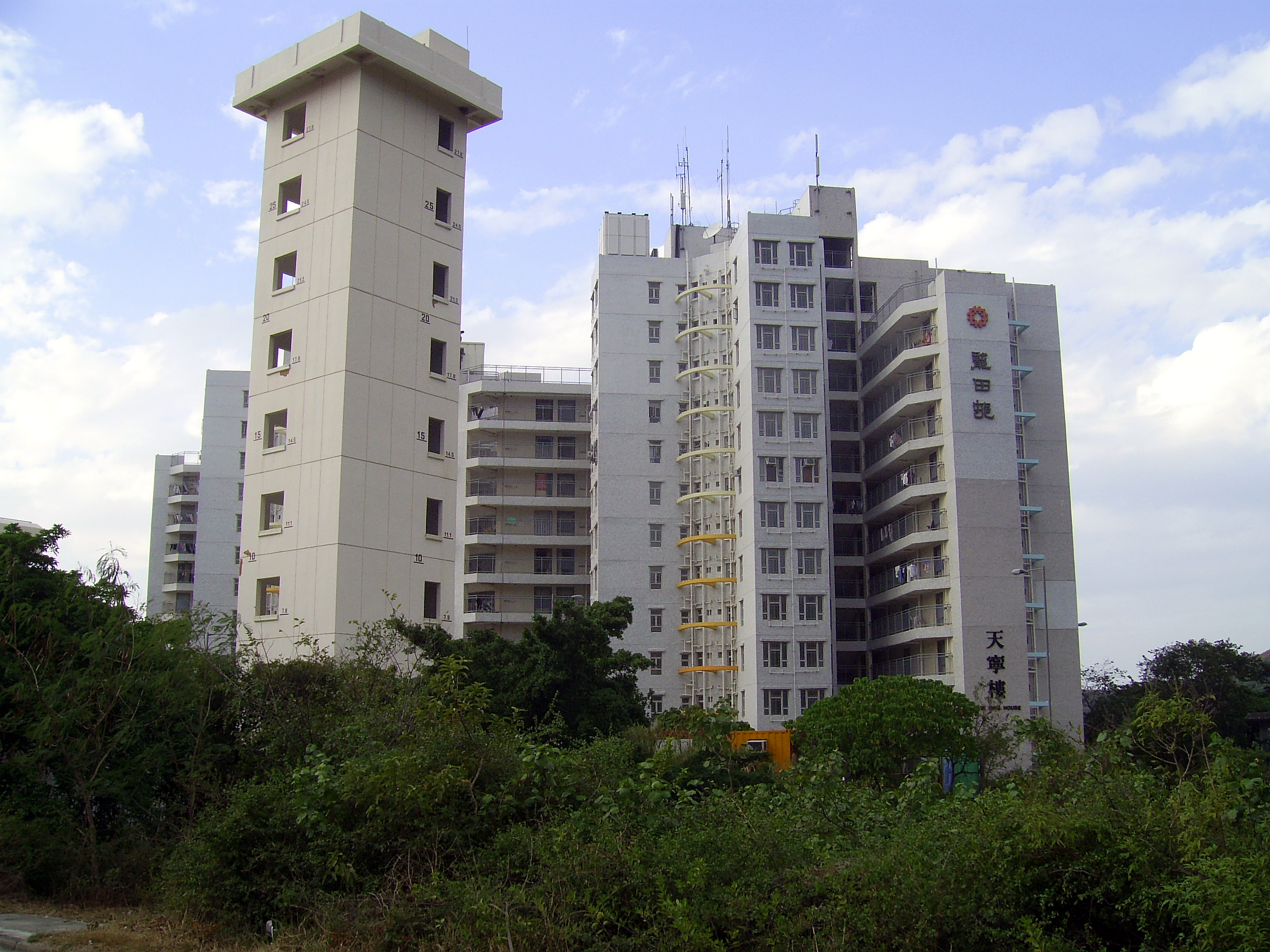
Tin Ning House of Lung Tin Estate and the tower of Tai O (Sub-Division) Fire Station.

Lung Tin Estate (Chinese: 龍田邨) and Tin Lee Court (Chinese: 天利苑) are the sole Hong Kong Housing Authority public rental estate and HOS estate in south Lantau Island respectively. It is located in on the reclaimed land in east Tai O.

Tin Lee Court was once part of Lung Tin Estate. Yet due to high vacant rate of the building, it has been converted to HOS estate and sold at 2014, and the original residents were migrated.

Name	Type	Completion
Tin Choi House	Non-standard	1980
Tin Hei House	Non-standard	1980
Tin Kwai House	Non-standard	1980
Tin Ning House	Non-standard	1980
Tin Sing House	Non-standard	1980
Tin Tak House	Non-standard	1980
Tin Fook House	Non-standard	1980
Tin Fu House	Non-standard	1980

== Ngan Wan Estate ==
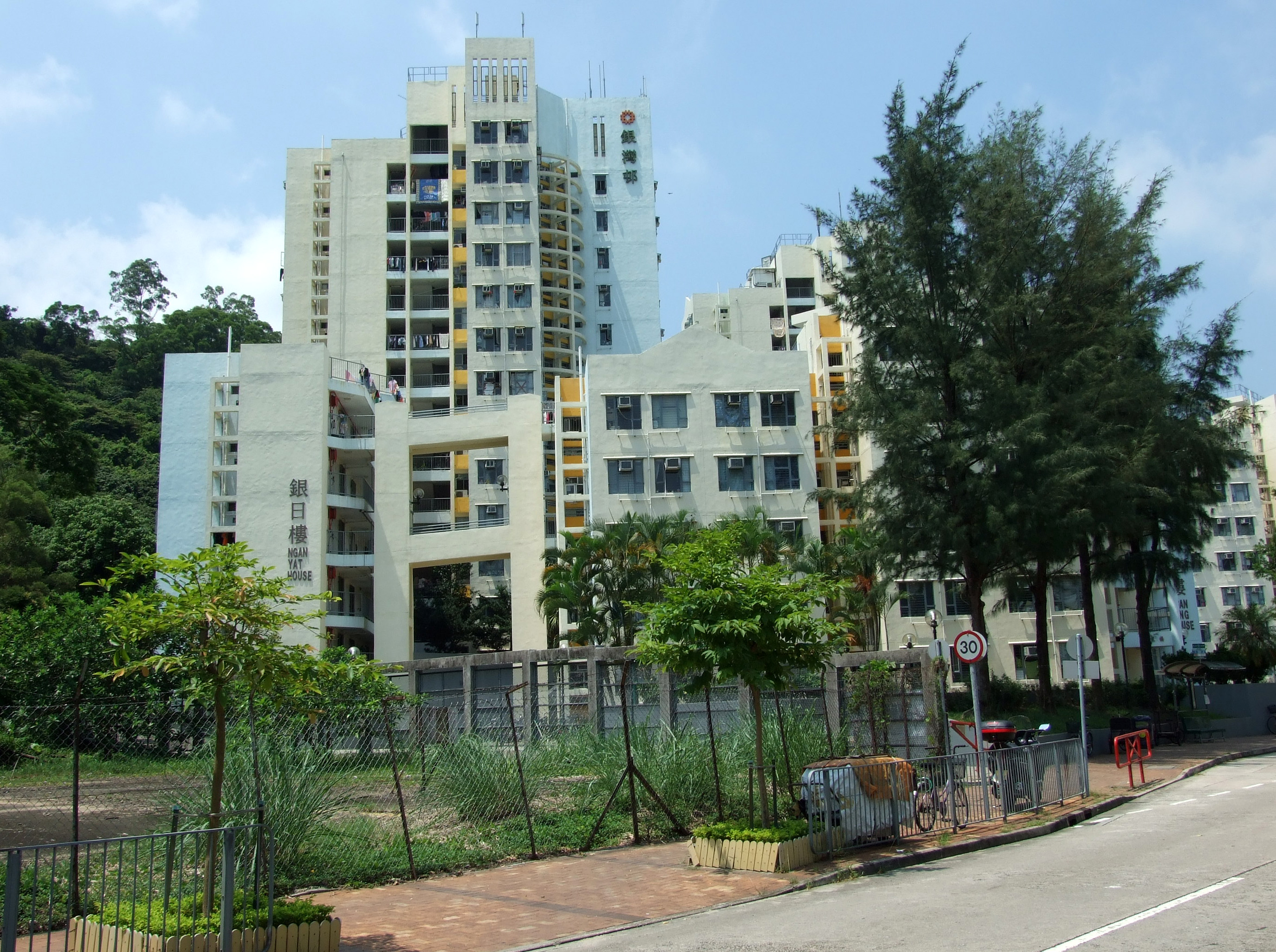
Ngan Yat House of Ngan Wan Estate.

Ngan Wan Estate (Chinese: 銀灣邨) is located in Ngan Kwong Wan Road, Mui Wo, a short distance from Mui Wo Ferry Pier. It consists of 4 residential blocks completed in 1988.

Name	Type	Completion
Ngan Yat House	Non-standard	1988
Ngan Yuet House	Non-standard	1988
Ngan Hung House	Non-standard	1988
Ngan Sing House	Non-standard	1988

== Ngan Ho Court and Ngan Wai Court ==
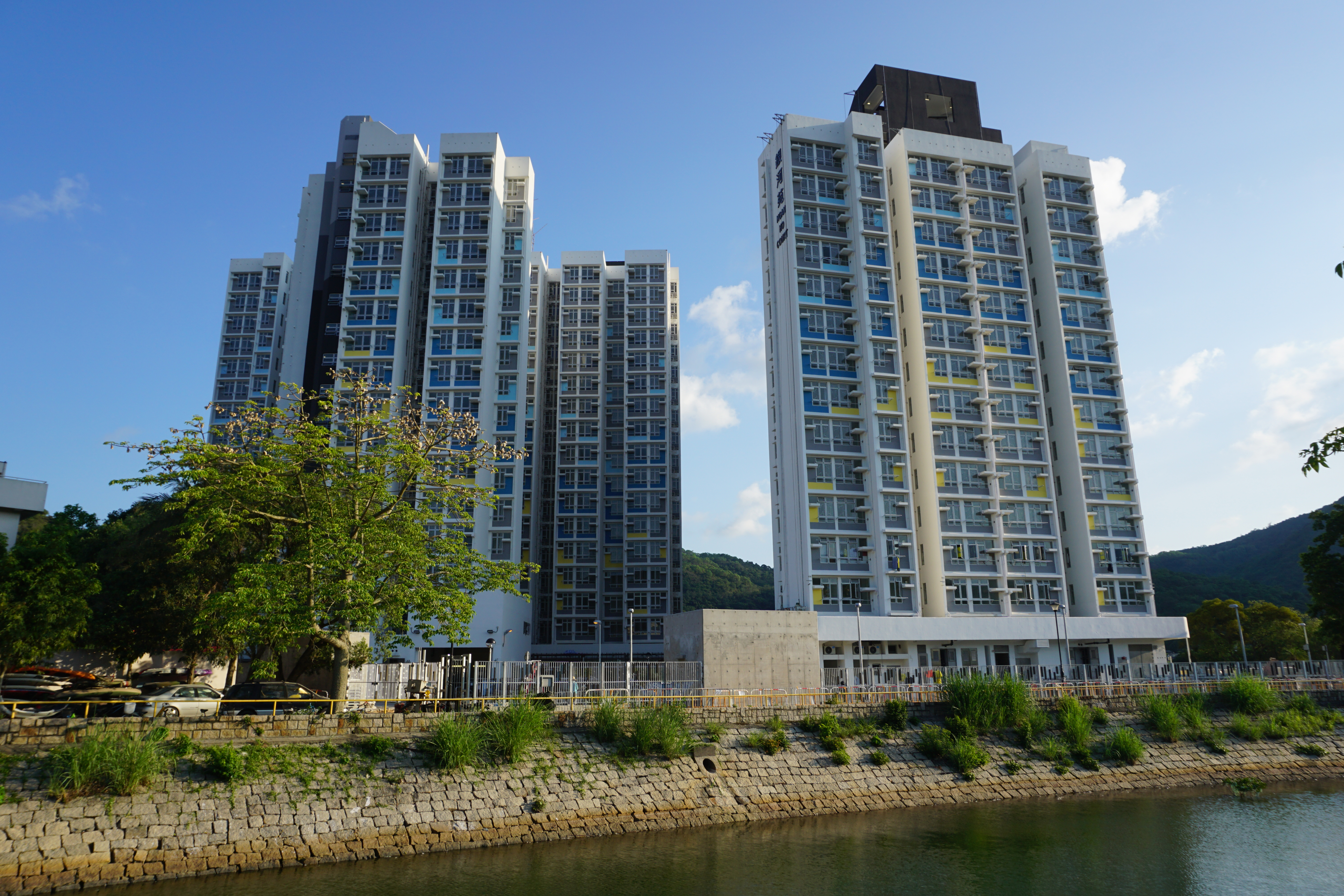
Ngan Ho Court

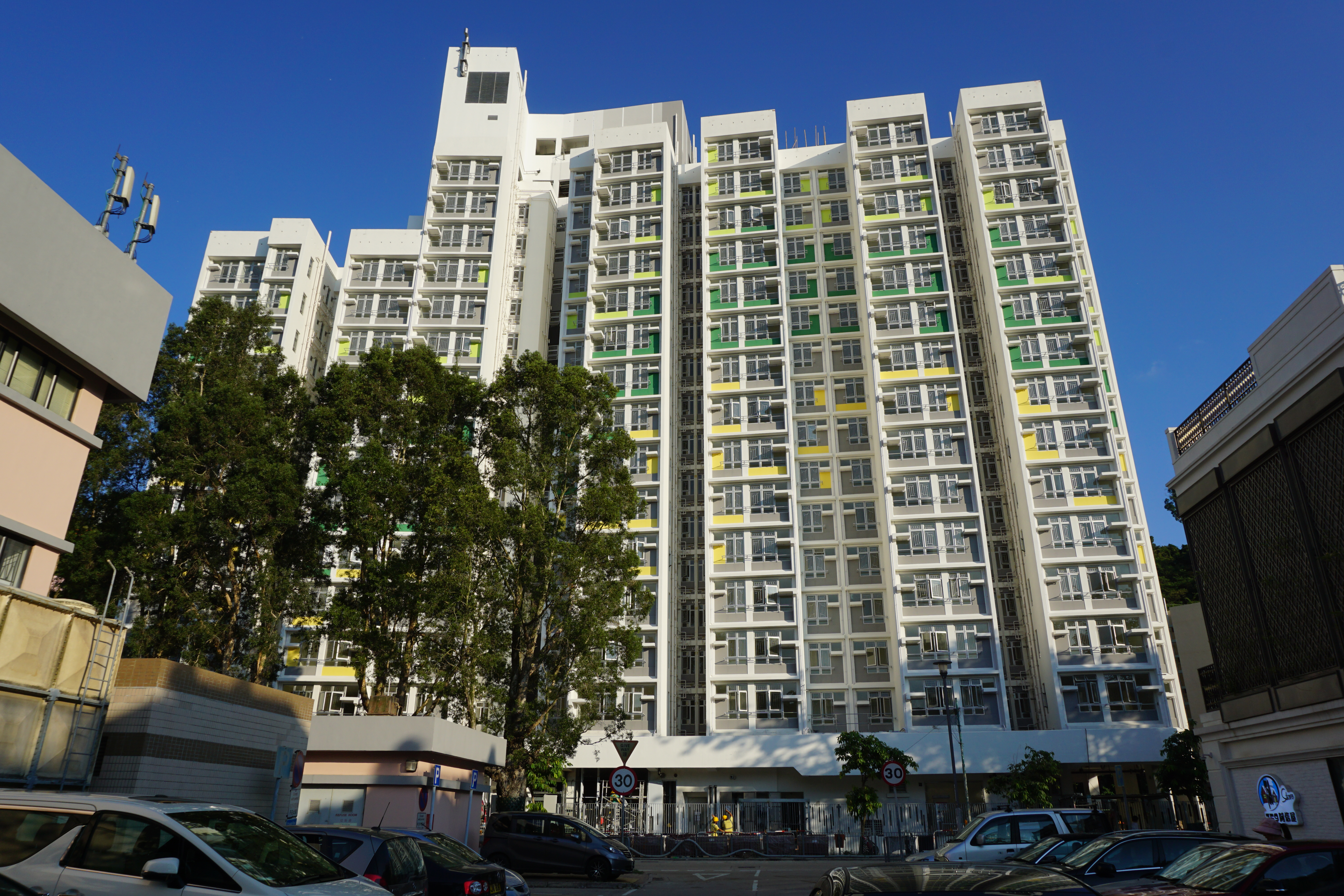
Ngan Wai Court

Ngan Ho Court (Chinese: 銀河苑) and Ngan Wai Court (Chinese: 銀蔚苑) are Home Ownership Scheme courts in Ngan Kwong Wan Road, Mui Wo.

Ngan Ho Court comprises 2 blocks with 529 flats in total while Ngan Wai Court comprises 1 block with 170 flats in total. They are the only HOS courts on outlying islands (except Tung Chung) which were sold in 2010's. They were sold in 2017 and completed in 2018.

Name of Ngan Ho Court	Type	Completion
Ngan Yuk House (Block A)	Non-standard	2018
Ngan Long House (Block B)	Non-standard	2018

Name of Ngan Wai Court	Type	Completion
Ngan Wai Court	Non-standard	2018

== Ying Tung Estate ==
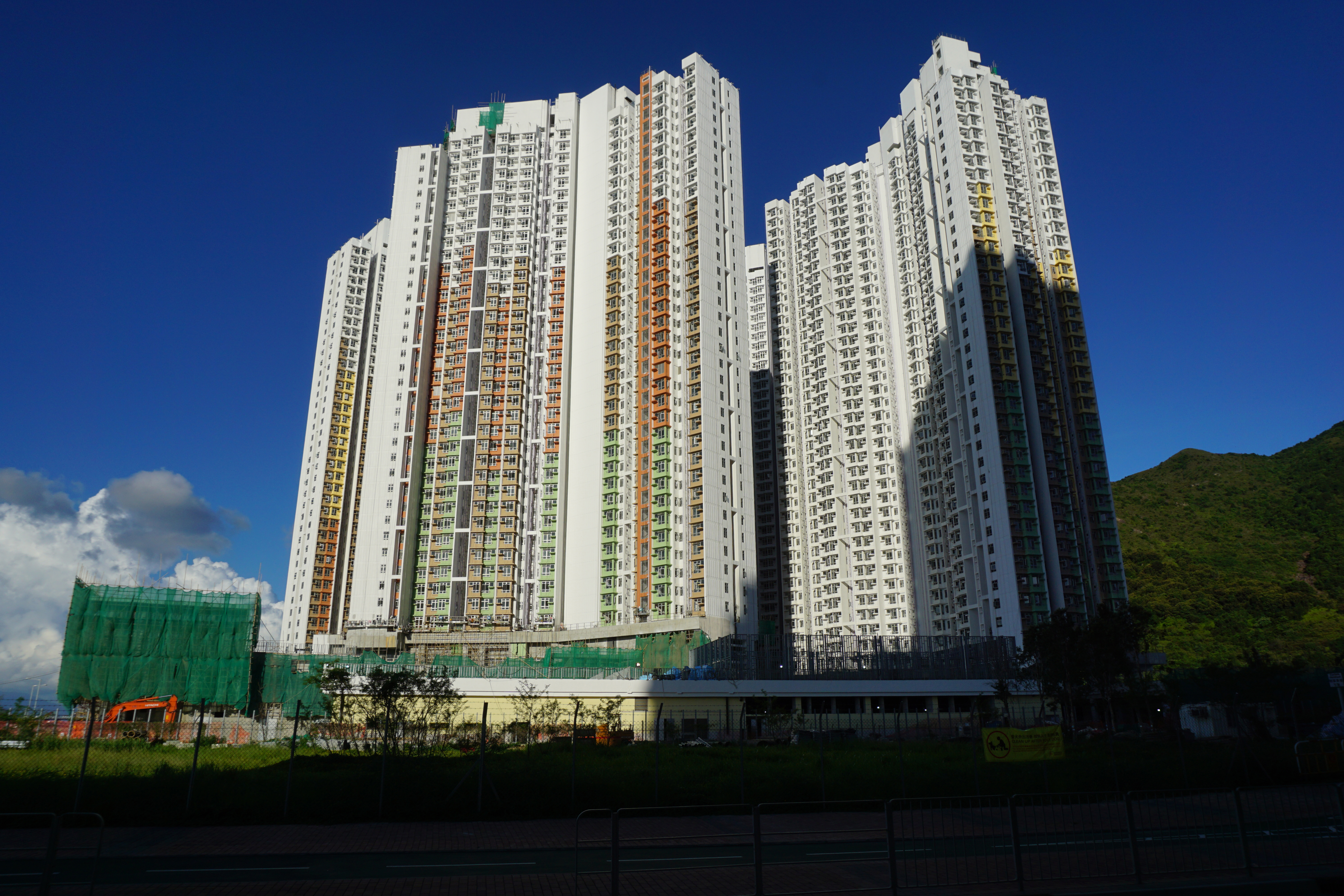
Ying Tung Estate

Ying Tung Estate (Chinese: 迎東邨) is built on the Northeastern Coast of Tung Chung, next to Ying Tung Road in 2018, it consists of 4 blocks, namely Ying Chui House, Ying Yuet House, Ying Hei House and Ying Fook House.

== Mun Tung Estate ==
Mun Tung Estate (Chinese: 滿東邨) is located in Tung Chung. It consists of 4 residential blocks completed in 2018.

== Yu Tai Court ==
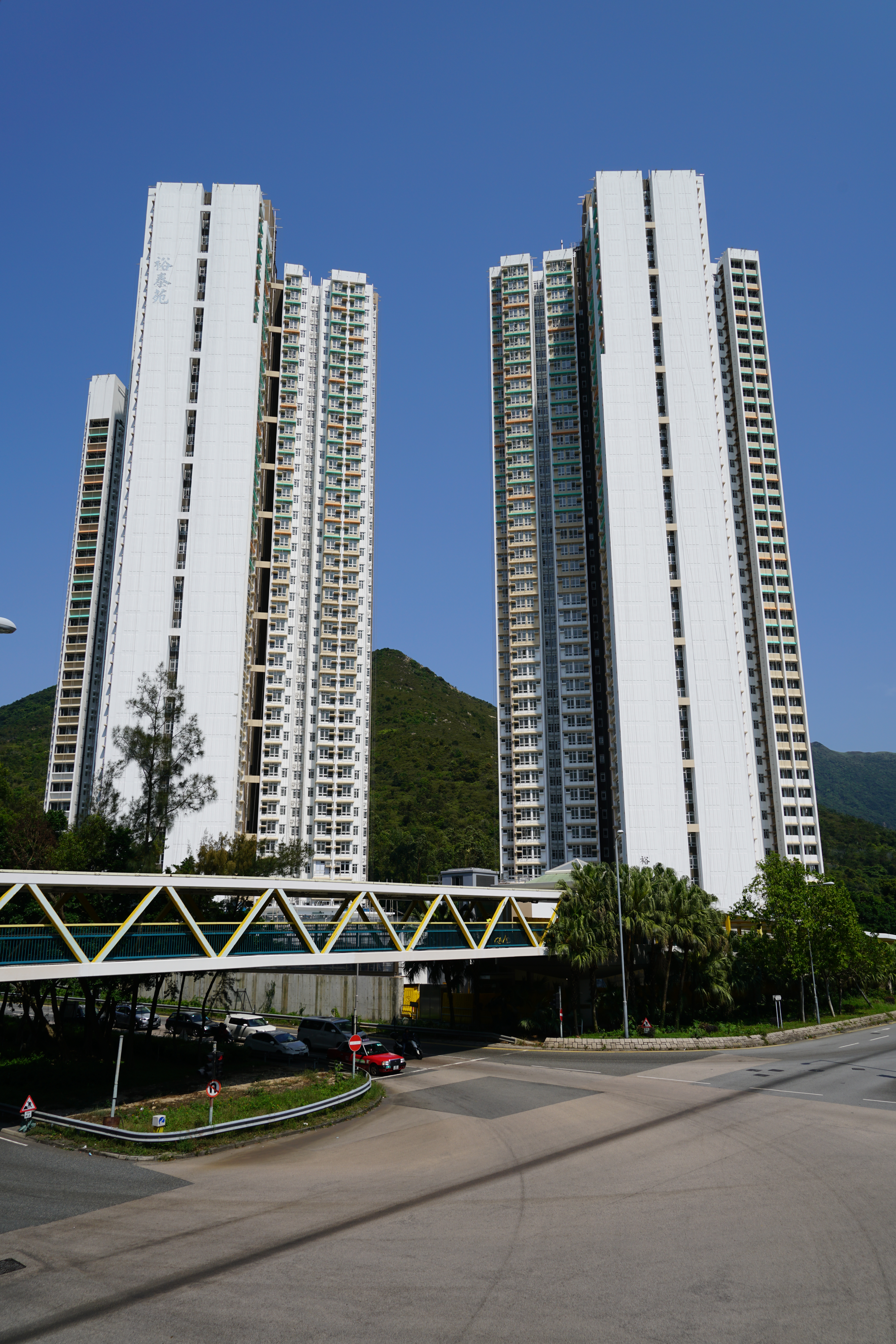
Yu Tai Court

Yu Tai Court (Chinese: 裕泰苑) is located in Tung Chung near Yat Tung Estate. It comprises two blocks with totally 1,226 flats at a saleable area of 25.8 square metres to 53.1 square metres. The flats were sold in 2018 and is expected to commence in 2020.

Name	Type	Completion
Yu Yuet House (Block A)	Non-standard	2020
Yu Ying House (Block B)	Non-standard	2020

== Yu Nga Court ==
Yu Nga Court (Chinese: 裕雅苑) is a Home Ownership Scheme court developed by the Hong Kong Housing Authority in Tung Chung, Lantau Island, New Territories, Hong Kong near Century Link, Bermuda Park, Yi Tung Park and Sheraton Hong Kong Tung Chung Hotel.

== See also ==
- Public housing in Hong Kong
- List of public housing estates in Hong Kong
